= Joliet Union Station =

Train station in Joliet, Illinois (1912-2014)

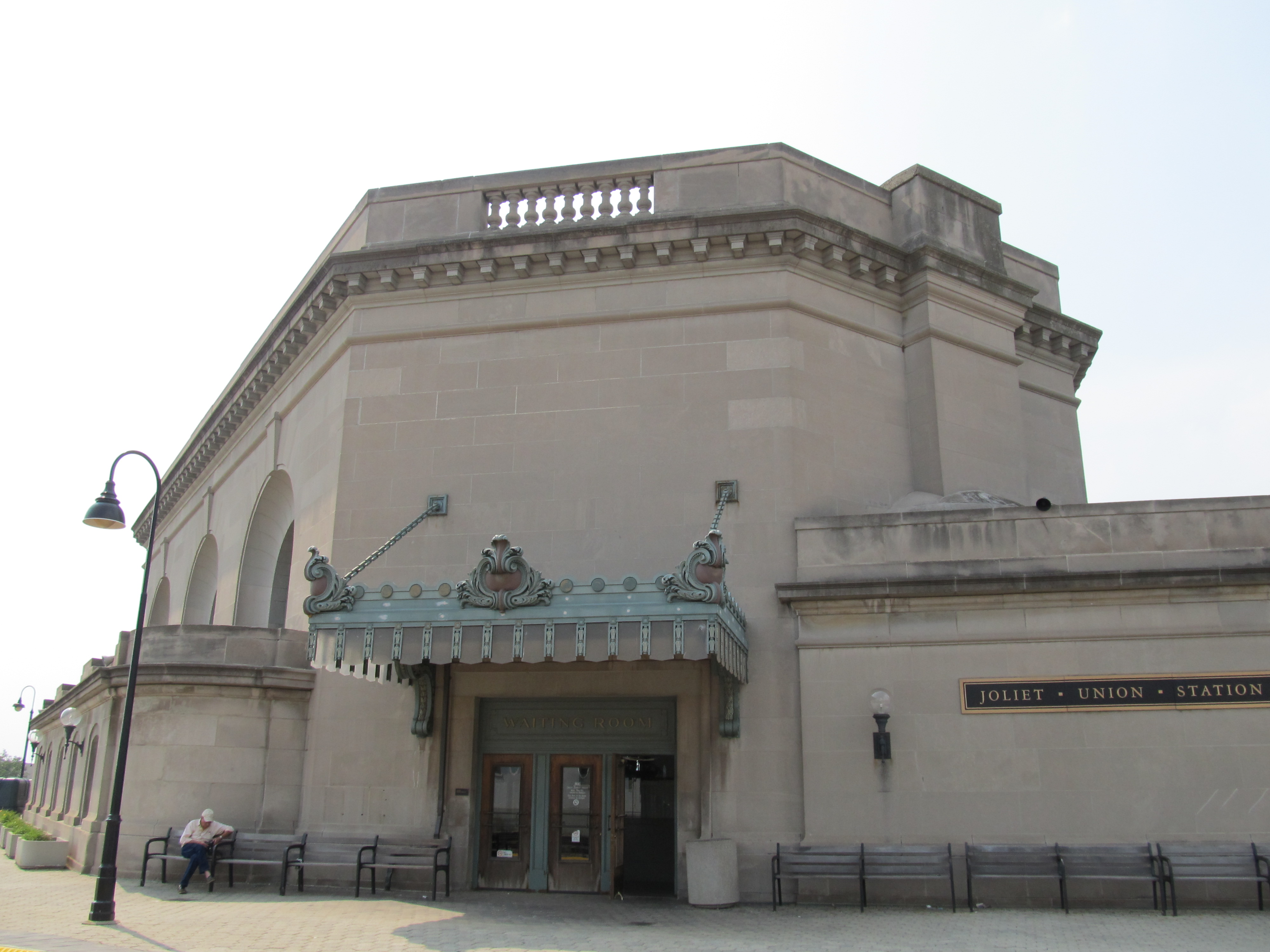

General information
- Location: 50 East Jefferson Street; Joliet, Illinois 60432
- Owner: City of Joliet (2/3) and Metra (1/3)
- Platforms: 1 side platform (Rock Island District); 1 side, 1 island (Amtrak)
- Tracks: 1 (Rock Island District); 4 (Amtrak)
- Connections: Pace Buses

Construction
- Parking: Yes
- Cycle facilities: Yes
- Accessible: Yes

Other information
- Station code: JOL (Amtrak)
- Fare zone: H (Metra)

History
- Opened: 1912
- Closed: 2014
- Rebuilt: 1989–1991

Passengers
- 2017: 61,367 ▲5.42% (Amtrak)

Former services
Preceding station	Amtrak	Following station
Pontiac toward Laredo or Houston	Inter-American	Chicago Terminus
Dwight toward St. Louis	Lincoln Service	Summit toward Chicago
Streator toward Dallas or Houston	Lone Star Until 1979	Chicago Terminus
Pontiac toward Los Angeles or San Antonio	Texas Eagle	Chicago Terminus
Streator toward Los Angeles	Southwest Chief Until 1996	Chicago Terminus
Eureka toward East Peoria	Prairie Marksman Until 1981	Chicago Terminus
Preceding station	Metra	Following station
Terminus	Heritage Corridor	Lockport toward Union Station
Terminus	Rock Island	New Lenox toward LaSalle
Preceding station	Atchison, Topeka and Santa Fe Railway	Following station
Millsdale toward Los Angeles	Main Line	Lockport toward Chicago
Preceding station	Chicago, Rock Island and Pacific Railroad	Following station
Bird's Bridge toward Colorado Springs	Main Line	Blue Island toward Chicago
Terminus	Suburban Service	New Lenox toward Chicago
Preceding station	Alton Railroad	Following station
Elwood toward St. Louis	Main Line	State Prison toward Chicago
- Joliet Union Station
- U.S. National Register of Historic Places
- Interactive map of Joliet Union Station
- Location: Joliet, Illinois, US
- Coordinates: 41°31′28″N 88°4′46″W
- Architect: Cook Engineering & Construction, Jarvis Hunt
- Architectural style: Beaux Arts/Classical
- NRHP reference No.: 78001200
- Added to NRHP: August 1, 1978
Track layout
Key
Location

Joliet Union Station is an inactive Beaux-Arts train station in downtown Joliet, Illinois, built in 1912. Union Station was constructed as part of a large improvement project for the six railroads serving Joliet, which converged on the city as an important rail transportation hub just outside Chicago. At its peak, Union Station served over 100 intercity trains per day, with additional commuter and interurban service.

Joliet Union Station was listed on the National Register of Historic Places in 1978, in recognition of its architecture and its contribution to the city's railroad history. Amtrak and Metra trains served the station until 2014, and it was fully replaced by the Joliet Transportation Center in 2018. The station is owned by the city of Joliet, and is currently operated as a banquet hall.

== History ==
The city of Joliet gained its city charter and current name in 1852, and the Chicago and Rock Island Railroad began service to the city the same year. The Rock Island opened a depot on East Jefferson Street, at the site of the current Union Station, in 1854. Joliet was served by four trunkline railroads by 1885: the Rock Island; the Atchison, Topeka and Santa Fe; the Chicago & Alton; and the Michigan Central. Each railroad operated its own station in Joliet, and the city grew into a major rail hub.

Train traffic increased steadily in the late 19th century, with over 60 trains per day passing through downtown. The railroads in Joliet initiated an improvement project in 1909, which elevated the railroad lines through downtown to address concerns about traffic and safety. The improvement project included a new union station at the site of the Rock Island depot constructed in 1854, which was strategically located at the intersection of the Rock Island and Alton main lines. The Rock Island, AT&SF, and Alton railroads owned the depot in equal shares.

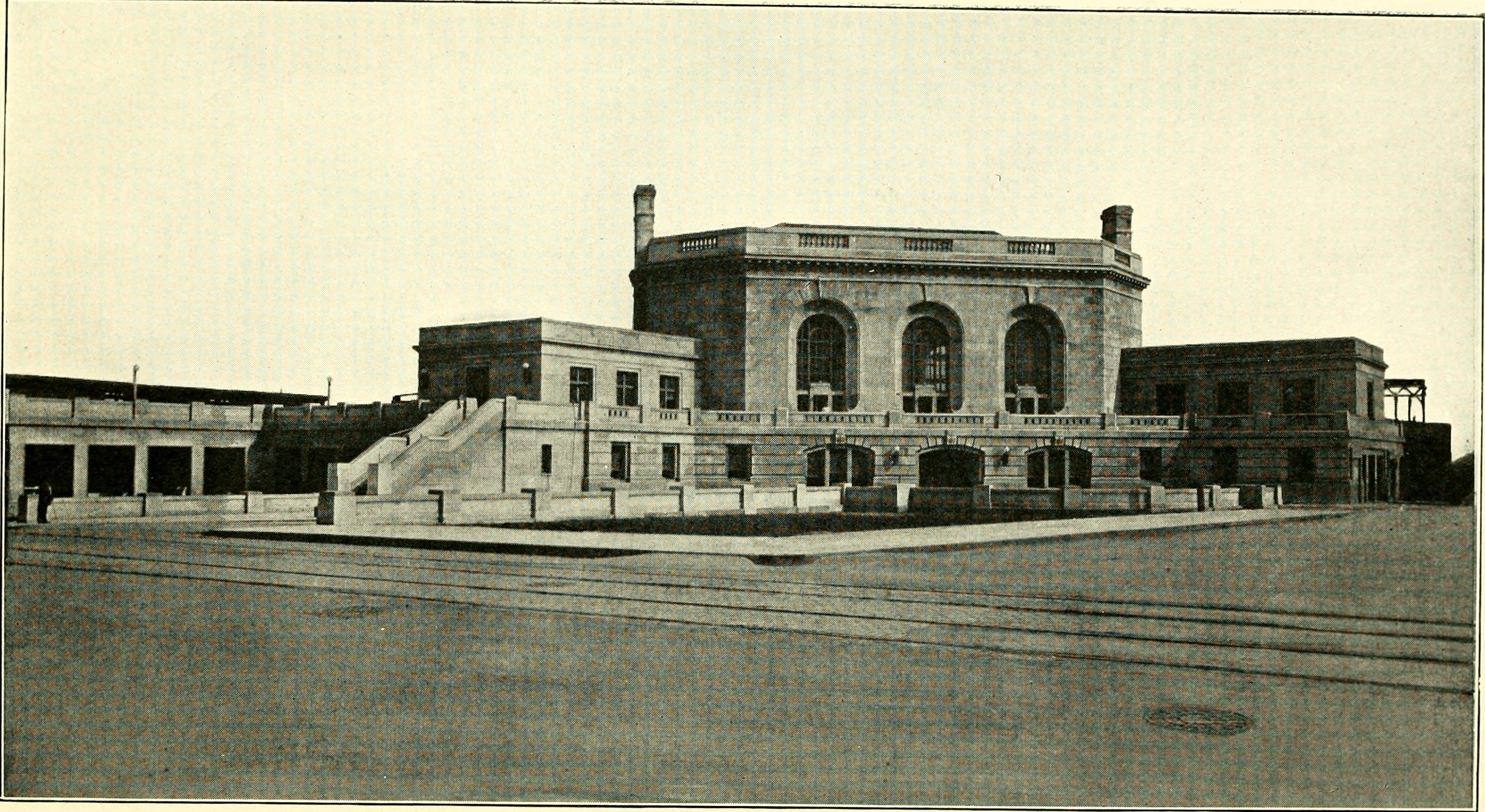
The station at its opening in 1912, with interurban tracks in the foreground

The station was designed in the Beaux-Arts style by Chicago-based architect Jarvis Hunt, who also designed the contemporaneous Kansas City Union Station. Joliet Union Station was built by the Adam Groth Company of Joliet, and used a steel frame and a Bedford limestone facade, with bronze fixtures and interior finishes of Tennessee marble. The station was originally designed for passengers to enter through a ticket lobby at street level, and proceed to a grand second-floor waiting room before boarding their train. The station was constructed at a cost of $250,000, equivalent to $5.9 million in 2024.

Joliet Union Station opened on October 14, 1912, serving all four of the trunkline railroads in Joliet. The opening was a major event in the city, with a banquet attended by 450, and another 1500 people in attendance. The Joliet Evening Herald praised the new station and its opening ceremony, remarking that "the banquet was excellent albeit dry and smokeless. The speeches were also excellent and smokeless, although not dry." Despite their involvement in constructing the station, leaders of the city government boycotted the opening, after they became involved in a dispute with the city's Commercial Club over which party contributed most to the project.

The station served over 100 trains per day at its peak, with 8 tracks: 4 north-south tracks for the AT&SF and Alton, and 4 east-west tracks for the Rock Island. Island platforms served the north–south and east–west tracks, with tunnels under the tracks for access. Union Station served passengers, U.S. Mail services, and express parcels for all four trunkline railroads, and each railroad maintained its own freight and service facilities elsewhere in the city. An interlocking tower was constructed around 1913 to control trains through the busy junction.

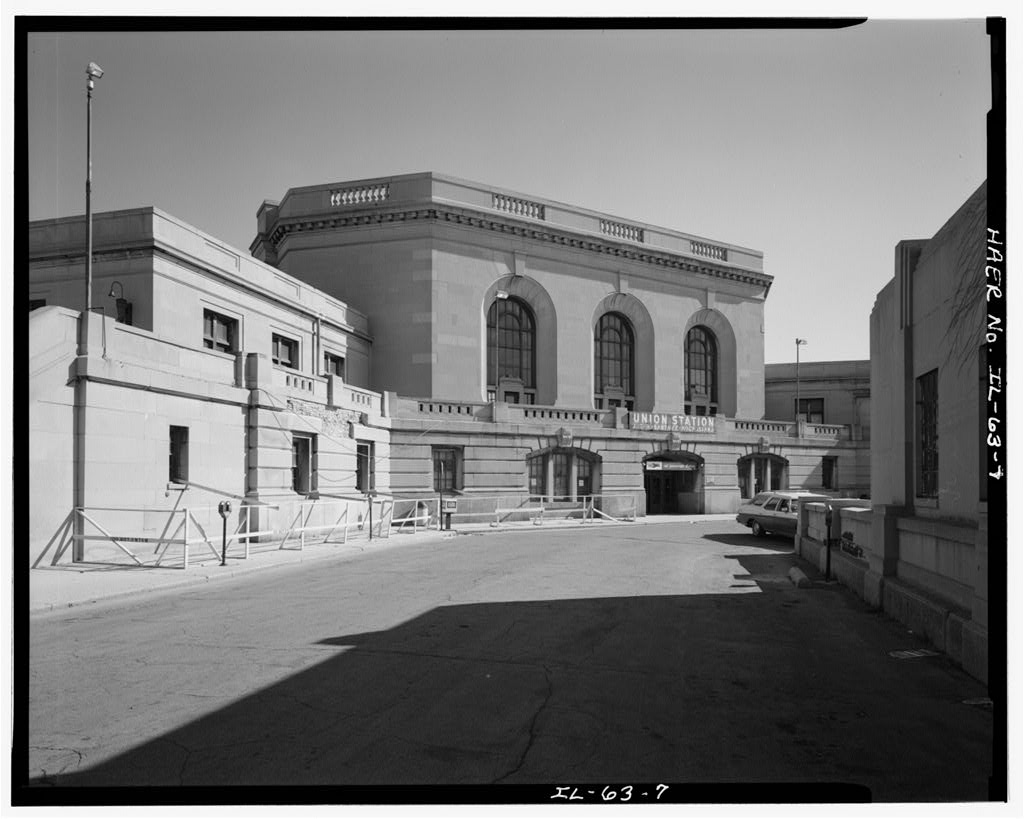
Joliet Union Station circa 1988, as documented by the Historic American Engineering Record

The Michigan Central discontinued passenger service to Joliet in 1925. Other railroads' services continued, and the station was substantially modified in the following decades. Maintenance rotated between the three railroads that owned the station, contributing to its decline. The ground-floor ticket lobby was closed in the late 1940s, and was sealed off. A dropped ceiling was installed in the grand second-floor waiting room in 1960, and flocks of pigeons promptly took up residence in the empty space. The tunnels to the platforms were filled in, requiring some passengers to cross tracks to board their trains.

Amtrak took over most passenger services at the station when it was created in 1971. Notably, Amtrak did not assume the operations of the Chicago, Rock Island and Pacific, which continued operating Joliet–Chicago commuter trains through the early 1980s, when operations and track ownership passed to Metra.

Joliet Union Station was listed on the National Register of Historic Places in 1978 over the objections of its owners, the corporate successors of the three railroads that built the station in 1912. The owners argued that the structure was crumbling and historically insignificant, and that its architect was not sufficiently notable.

The city and Metra partnered to purchase the station in 1987, and initiated a restoration program. The restoration revealed the original ceiling of the waiting room, and decorative metalwork damaged by decades of rust was recreated. The restored station was rededicated in October 1991, 79 years after the building opened.

== Infrastructure ==
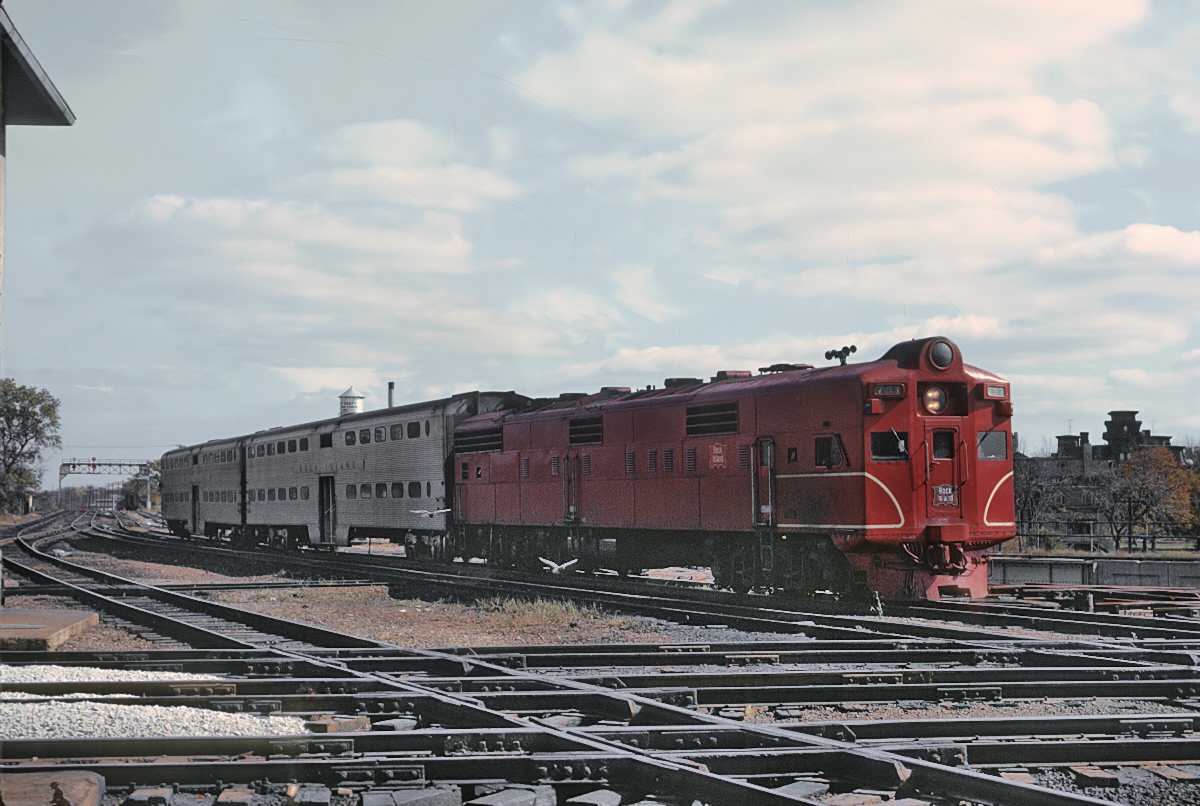
A Chicago, Rock Island and Pacific commuter train enters Joliet Union Station in 1966, with the 6-track diamond in the foreground

Joliet Union Station's location at the junction of multiple railroad main lines has contributed to its rise and fall. The east–west tracks through the station, formerly the Rock Island main line, are owned by Metra east of the station, and by CSX west of the station. The four north–south tracks are busy freight lines, owned by separate companies. The two western tracks, closest to the station, are operated by BNSF as the Chillicothe Subdivision, part of the Southern Transcon corridor from Chicago to Los Angeles. The two eastern tracks are part of the Canadian National Joliet Subdivision, which also serves trains operated by Union Pacific.

On the Metra Rock Island District line, Joliet is 40.2 miles (64.7 km) away from LaSalle Street Station in Chicago. On the Heritage Corridor and Amtrak routes, it is 37.2 miles (59.9 km) away from Chicago Union Station.

The junction at Joliet Union Station contributed to the successful operation of the station in its early years, but it later became an obstacle. The north–south tracks through the station are a busy freight corridor, and trains on these tracks were required to stop for passenger trains at Union Station. Rock Island District commuter trains had to cross all four north–south tracks to reach the platform at Union Station, stopping north–south traffic. Amtrak and Heritage Corridor trains boarded passengers from the eastern pair of north–south tracks, requiring passengers to walk across two tracks to the station building. This led to conflict between Metra, Amtrak, and the freight railroads.

== Replacement ==
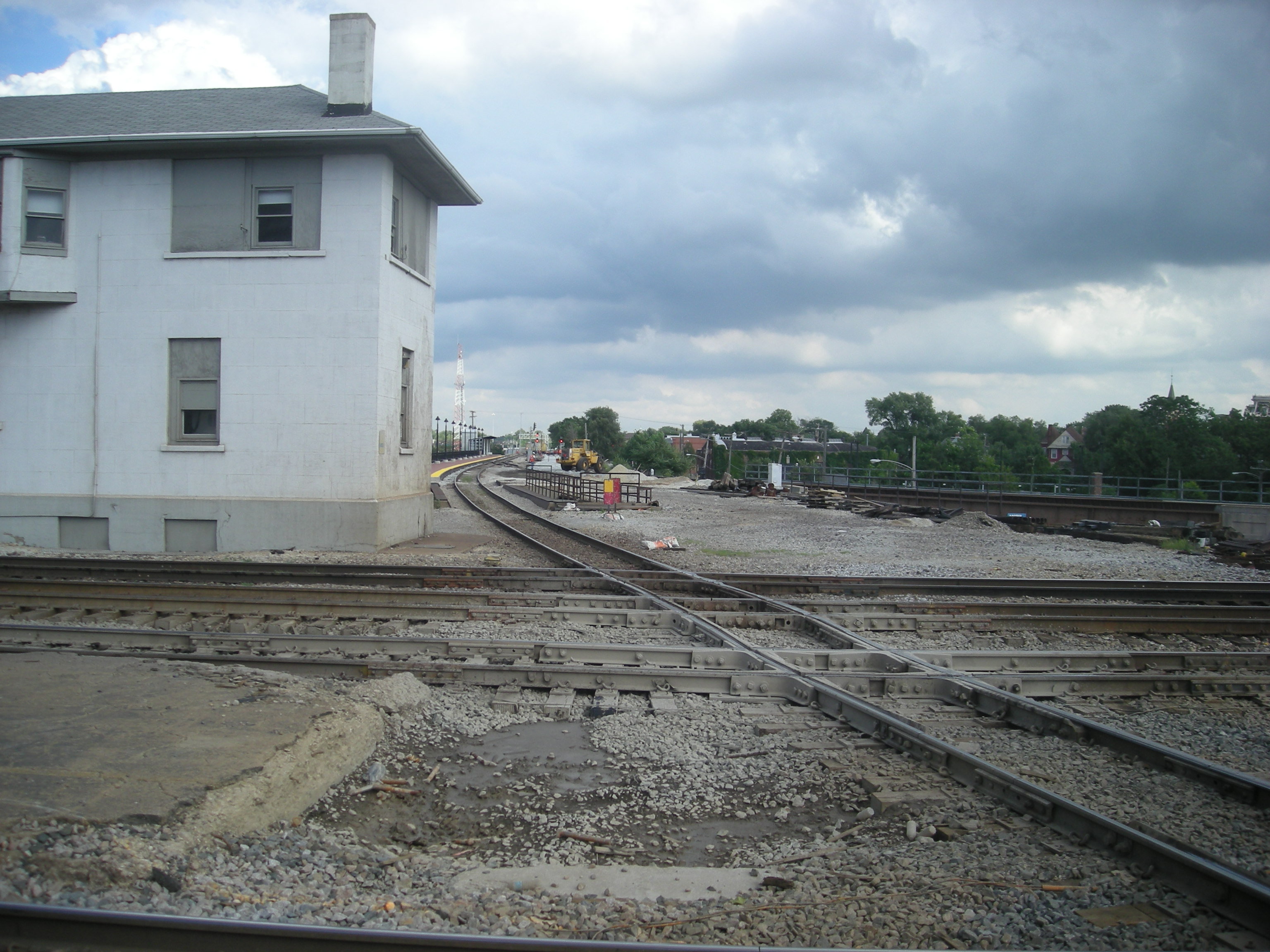
View from the Rock Island District platform looking east in 2014, with Joliet Transportation Center construction in the background

The state government of Illinois announced a $42 million long-term plan in 2010 to replace Joliet Union Station and partly rebuild the tracks. $32 million came from "Illinois Jobs Now!", a six-year, $31 billion statewide capital program supported by 20 year state bonds and federal and local matching funds. The BNSF Railway also pledged $2.2 million and the city contributed $7.5 million.

The project included new tunnels to the platform serving Heritage Corridor and Amtrak trains, and a new platform for Rock Island District trains to the east of Union Station. Joliet Union Station closed to passengers in 2014, with passengers using temporary facilities until construction of the new station building was complete. The Joliet Transportation Center opened on April 11, 2018.

The opening of the new station eliminated many of the previous conflicts between freight trains and passenger trains. Rock Island District trains, which had to cross four active tracks to reach their platform at Union Station, now terminate at a platform on the near side of the freight lines. The introduction of the new station rendered the interlocking tower obsolete, and the tower is now preserved as part of a railroad museum operated by the Joliet Historical Museum.

Union Station continues to operate as an event venue. The former upper-level waiting room has been converted to a banquet hall, which accommodates up to 300 guests.
