= Willow Springs station (Illinois) =

Commuter rail station in Willow Springs, Illinois

Willow Springs

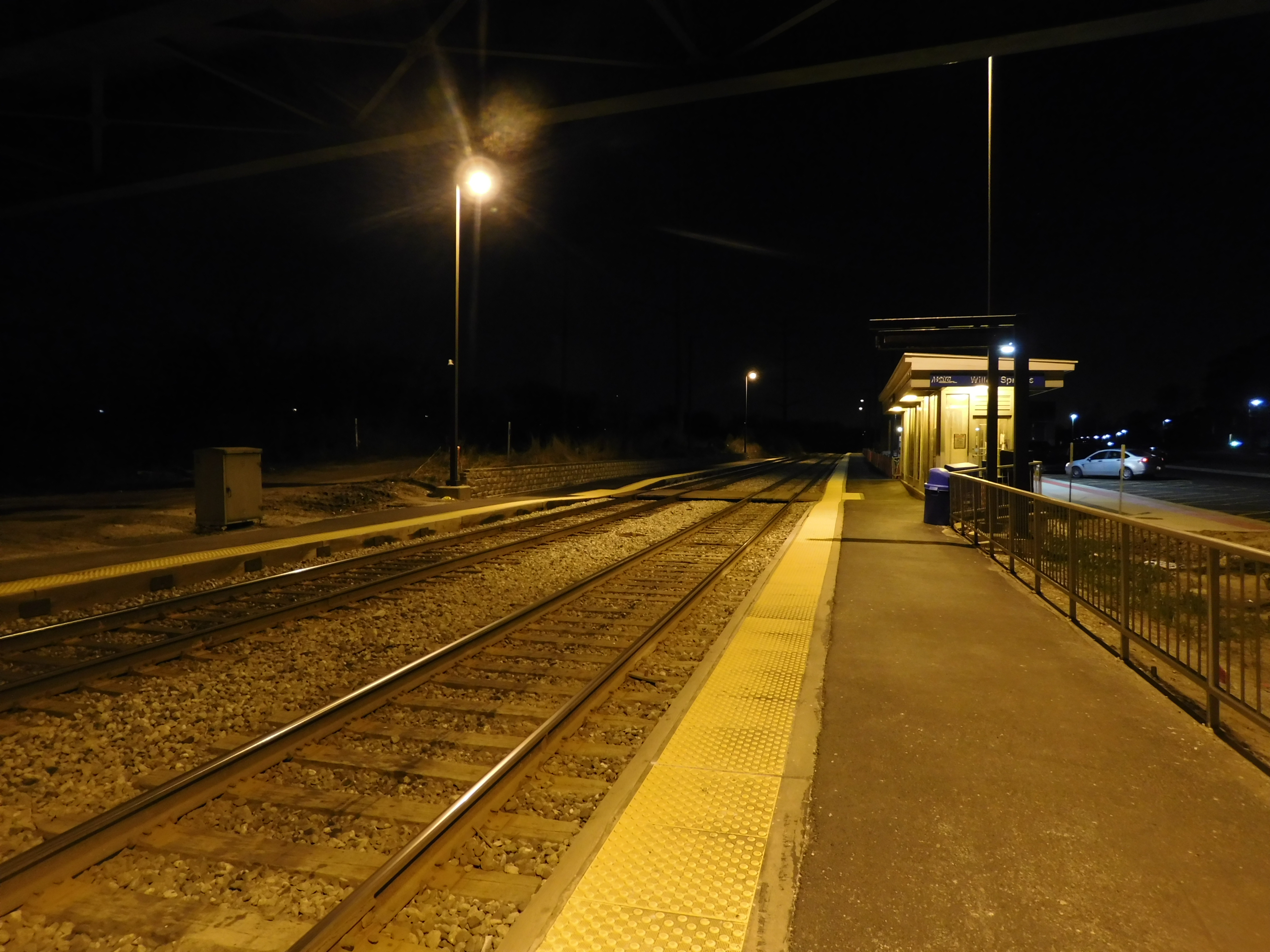
- Willow Springs station in April 2016.

General information
- Location: 87th Street & Archer Avenue; Willow Springs, Illinois
- Coordinates: 41.7334°N 87.8783°W
- Owner: Metra
- Line: CN Joliet Subdivision MT2
- Platforms: 2 side platforms
- Tracks: 2

Construction
- Accessible: Yes

Other information
- Fare zone: 3

History
- Opened: 1870

Passengers
- 2018: 148 (average weekday) ▲28.7%
- Rank: 170 out of 236

Services
Preceding station	Metra	Following station
Lemont toward Joliet	Heritage Corridor	Summit toward Union Station
Former services
Preceding station	Alton Railroad	Following station
Lambert toward St. Louis	Main Line	Mt. Forest toward Chicago
Track layout
Location

Willow Springs is a station on Metra's Heritage Corridor in Willow Springs, Illinois. The station is 17.5 miles (28.2 km) away from Union Station, the northern terminus of the line. In Metra's zone-based fare system, Willow Springs is in zone 3. As of 2018, Willow Springs is the 170th busiest of Metra's 236 non-downtown stations, with an average of 148 weekday boardings.

The tracks run parallel to both the Illinois and Michigan Canal and the Chicago Sanitary and Ship Canal. They also run along a former Chicago and Alton Railroad line, and shares the right-of-way with Amtrak's Lincoln Service and Texas Eagle trains, however, no Amtrak trains stop here.

As of February 15, 2024, Willow Springs is served by three inbound trains in the morning and three outbound trains in the evening on weekdays only.

Though Metra gives the address to the station as being at 87th Street and Archer Avenue, the actual location is along Willow Boulevard beneath the Gilbert Avenue Bridge. The current station is on the east side below this bridge. Parking is available on the west side of the bridge.
