= Lemont =

Lemont may refer to:

- Lemont, Illinois
  - Lemont station
- Lemont, Pennsylvania
- Lemont, Tasmania
- Lemont Township, Cook County, Illinois
