= Lemont station =

Commuter rail station in Lemont, Illinois

Lemont

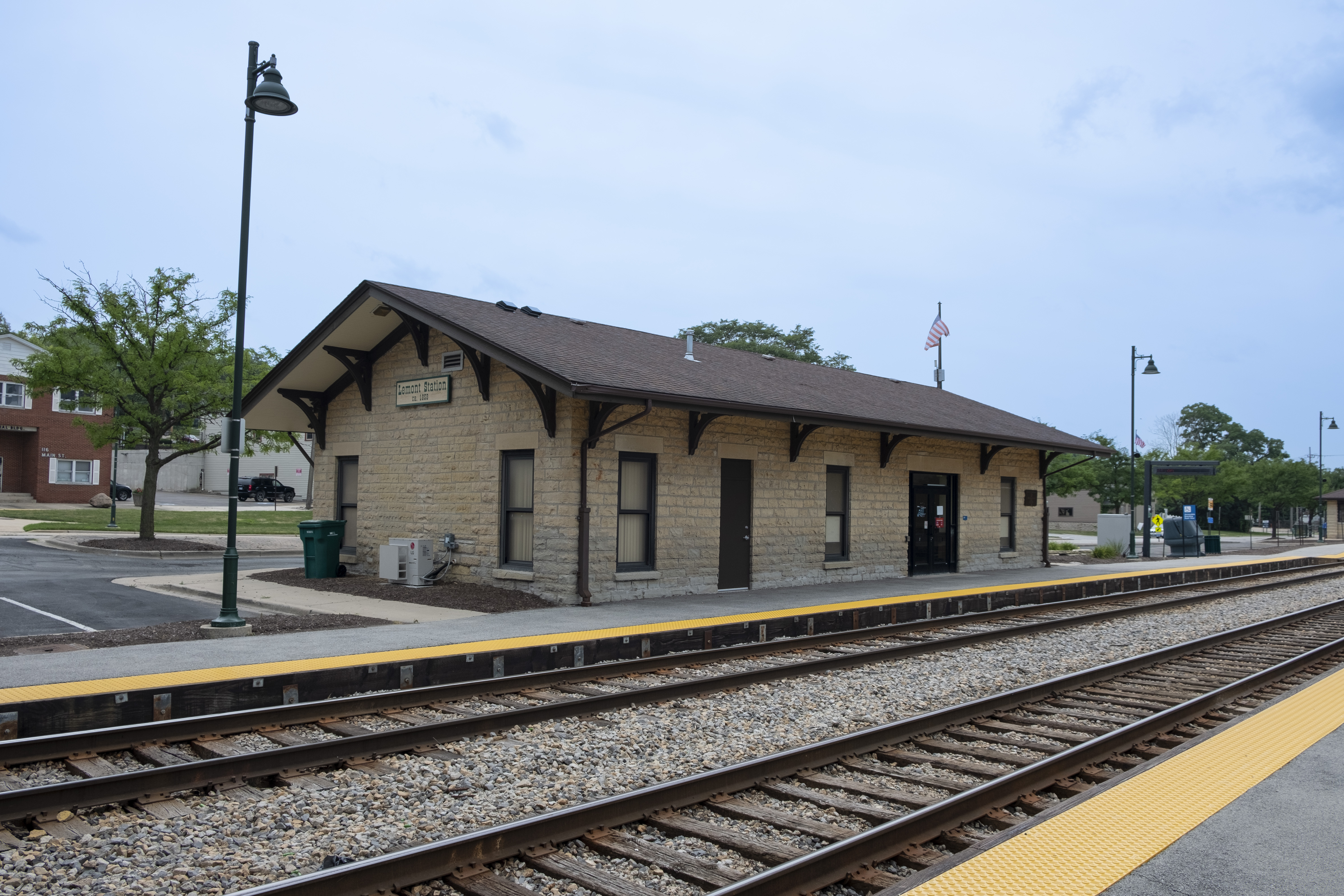
- Lemont station in July 2020

General information
- Location: 101 Main Street; Lemont, Illinois
- Coordinates: 41.6737°N 88.0024°W
- Owner: Metra
- Line: CN Joliet Subdivision
- Platforms: 2 side platforms
- Tracks: 2

Construction
- Accessible: Yes

Other information
- Fare zone: 3

History
- Opened: 1859

Passengers
- 2018: 455 (average weekday) ▼7%
- Rank: 105 out of 236

Services
| Preceding station | Metra | Following station |
|---|---|---|
| Romeoville toward Joliet | Heritage Corridor | Willow Springs toward Union Station |
Former services
| Preceding station | Metra | Following station |
|---|---|---|
| 5th Street closed 1988 toward Joliet | Heritage Corridor | Willow Springs toward Union Station |
| Preceding station | Alton Railroad | Following station |
| Lockport toward St. Louis | Main Line | Lambert toward Chicago |
Track layout
Location

Lemont station is a station on Metra's Heritage Corridor in Lemont, Illinois. The station is 25.3 miles (40.7 km) away from Union Station, the northern terminus of the line. In Metra's zone-based fare system, Lemont is in zone 3. As of 2018, Lemont is the 105th busiest of Metra's 236 non-downtown stations, with an average of 455 weekday boardings.

As of February 15, 2024, Lemont is served by three inbound trains in the morning and three outbound trains in the evening on weekdays only.

Lemont station was originally built by the Chicago and Alton Railroad in 1859 and designed in a manner similar to that of Lockport station. The tracks run parallel to the Illinois and Michigan Canal, and shares the right-of-way with Amtrak's Lincoln Service and Texas Eagle trains, however, no Amtrak trains stop here.
