= Romeoville station =

Romeoville station could refer to:

- Romeoville station (Metra), a commuter rail station in Romeoville, Illinois, which opened in 2018
- Romeoville station (Atchison, Topeka and Santa Fe Railway), a demolished station in Romeoville, Illinois
