= Joliet Correctional Center =

American prison in Illinois (1858–2002)

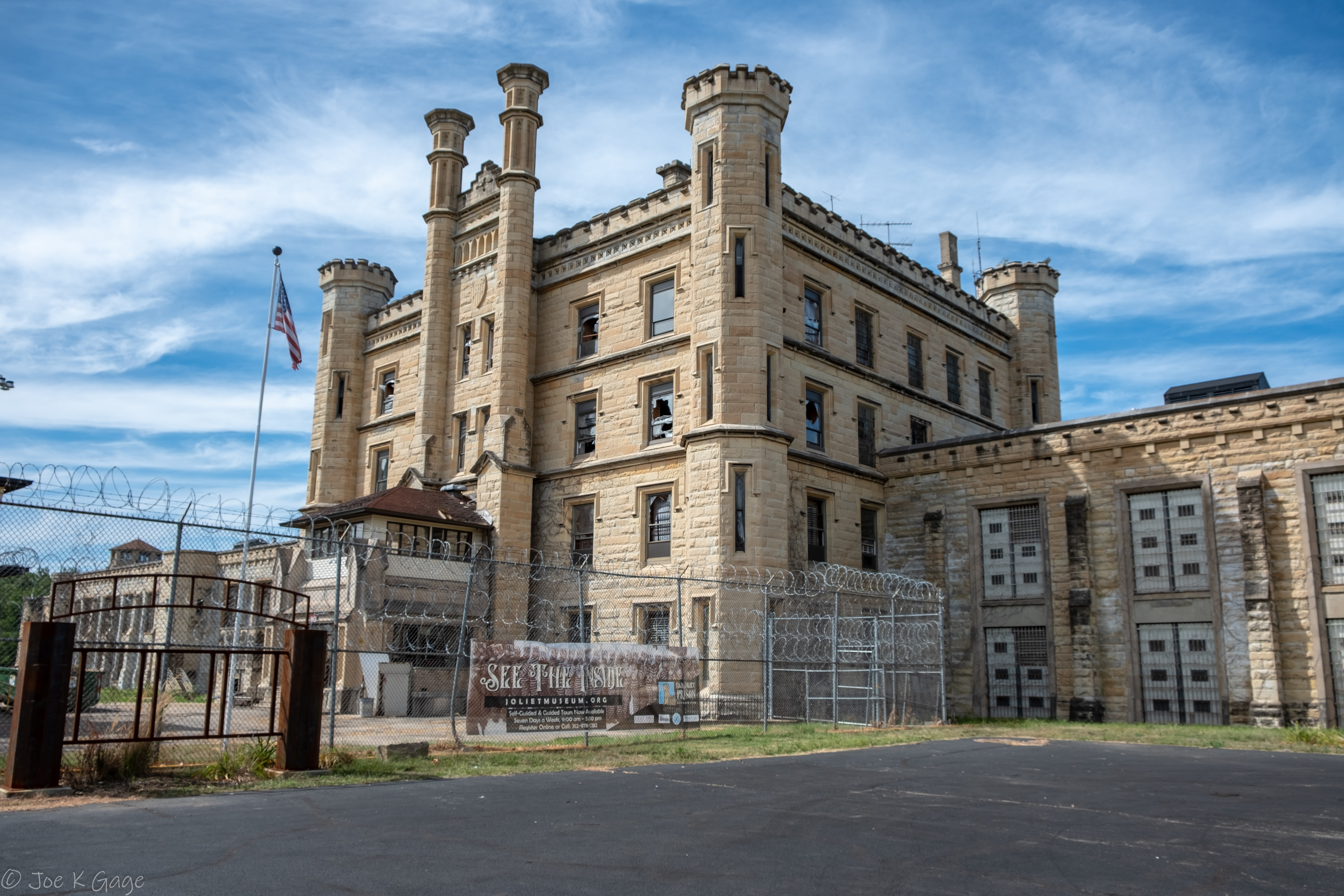
- Main entrance in 2020
- Interactive map of Joliet Correctional Center
- Location: Joliet, Illinois, United States; 41°32′49″N 88°04′27″W
- Status: Opened for tours in 2018
- Opened: 1858
- Closed: 2002
- Website: www.jolietprison.org

Joliet Correctional Center (originally known as Illinois State Penitentiary, colloquially as Joliet Prison, Joliet Penitentiary, the Old Joliet Prison, and the Collins Street Prison) is a former prison in Joliet, Illinois, United States, which operated from 1858 to 2002.

Numerous films and television productions have used the prison as a setting or filming location. In the 1980 film The Blues Brothers, character Jake Blues is released from the prison at the beginning of the movie (hence his nickname "Joliet Jake"). Footage of the prison is used for the exterior shots for the Illinois "state prison" in the 1949 film White Heat, and for the location of the first and second season of the series Prison Break, and the 2006 film Let's Go to Prison.

In 2018, the decommissioned prison was opened to guided tours.

== Operation ==
Joliet Correctional Center opened in 1858. The prison was built with convict labor leased by the state to contractor Lorenzo P. Sanger and warden Samuel K. Casey. The limestone used to build the prison was quarried on the site. The first 33 inmates arrived from Alton in May 1858 to begin construction; the last prisoners were transferred in July 1860. Both criminals and prisoners of war were confined there during the Civil War. The first corrections officer to be killed there was Joseph Clark in May of 1864. By 1872 the population had reached 1,239, a record number for a single prison. From the 1870s the prison had work contracts with local businesses.

The penitentiary's original plans included a one-hundred cell "Female Cell House" located inside the male penitentiary. Female prisoners were housed adjacent to men's cells from 1859 until 1870, when they were moved to the fourth floor of the central administration building. In 1896 a separate, one-hundred cellblock "Joliet Women's Prison" was built across the street from the male penitentiary. In design it was an exact mini-replica of the male prison. In 1933 all female prisoners were moved to the Oakdale Women's Reformatory (later known as Dwight Correctional Center) and the facility was used for male prisoners. The women's prison was converted into secondary facility to house male prisoners, making Joliet Prison an all-male prison.

The prison was slow to modernize. There was no running water or toilets in the cells in 1910. In 1917, the state began construction of the larger and modern Stateville Correctional Center, on a site 3 miles (4.8 km) to the north-northwest. Its March 1925 opening was meant to lead to the swift closure of Joliet. This did not happen, and both prisons operated simultaneously for the rest of the 20th century.

In 1924, Nathan Leopold and Richard Loeb were given life sentences to be served at Joliet (after their successful defense—from the death penalty—by Clarence Darrow). Their case was known as "the crime of the century" at the time after kidnapping and murdering teenager Robert "Bobby" Franks. During their time as inmates, the pair worked to make significant improvements to the prison's educational program.

A mock-up of the foyer is shown in the 1957 movie Baby Face Nelson where Lester Joseph Gillis (played by Mickey Rooney) is seen both entering and leaving the facility with a suitcase in his hand. The name of the prison can be seen in his exit sequence.

From at least the early 1960s, the prison included a reception and classification center for northern Illinois, holding new prisoners for less than a month before their final assignments and processing over 20,000 a year. In addition to the prisoners temporarily held in the R&C unit, Joliet maintained a large population of permanent inmates.

In the late 1960s, hepatitis experiments conducted at Willowbrook State School on developmentally disabled children became controversial. When these were discontinued, the US Army recruited "volunteers" at Joliet to continue the experiments. In reality, the "volunteers" were Vietnam-draft conscientious objectors, who agreed to drink feces-laden chocolate milkshakes and exposed to the feces of other inmates in an effort to mass-produce and isolate the virus that caused Hepatitis A. The Army was especially interested in Hepatitis A because it was a classic disease of overcrowding and unsanitary conditions common in prisons and military camps.

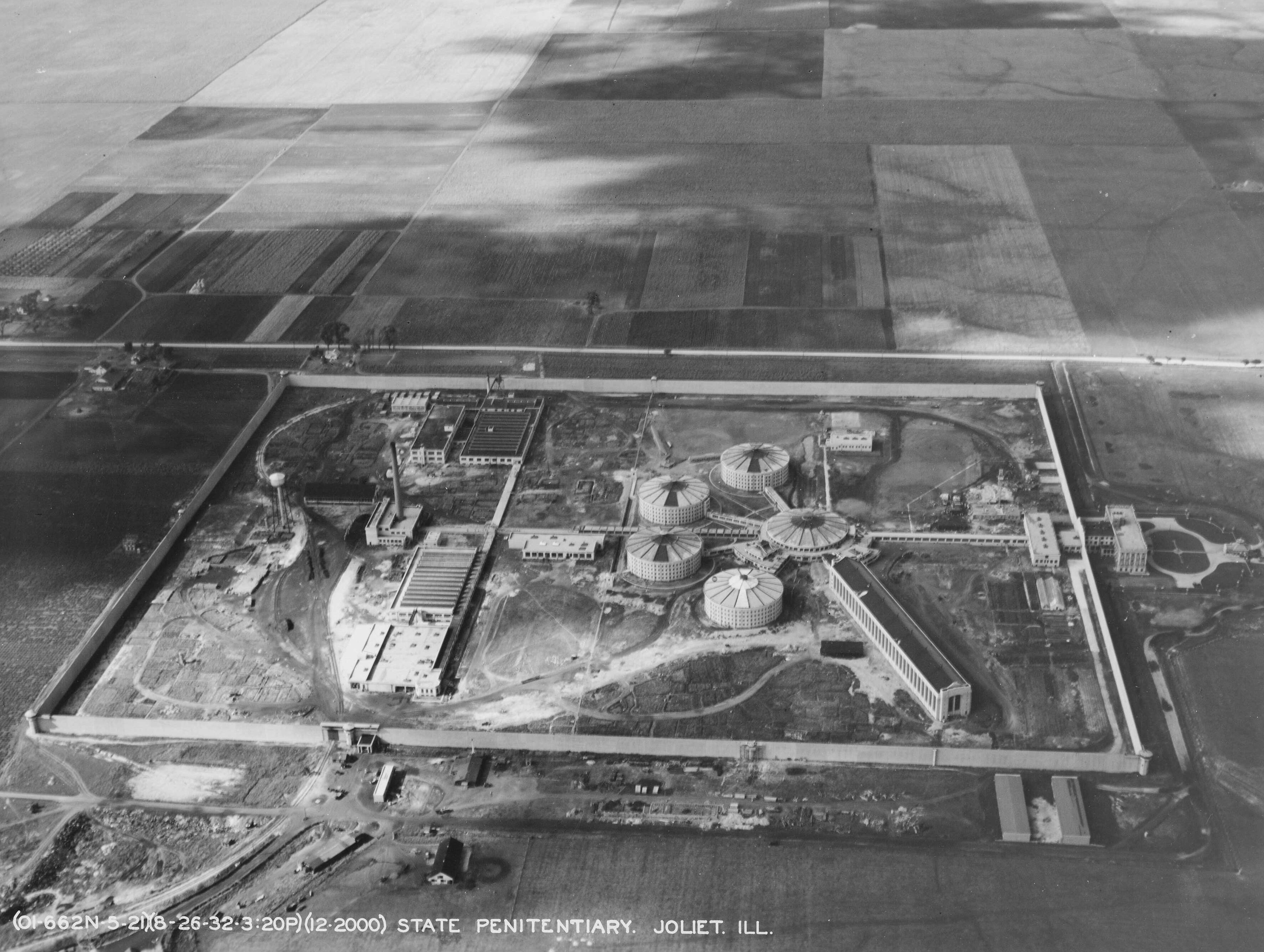
Stateville Correctional Center (pictured in 1932), which opened 2.5 miles (4.0 km) to the north-northwest in 1925, was meant to replace the Joliet Correctional Center; instead, the pair co-existed for 77 years.

In 1975, members of the Almighty Black P. Stone Nation and other Chicago street gangs took over a cell block and held several corrections officers hostage. Their main grievance was that they were being transferred to other prisons because they had too much control over other inmates at Joliet. One former gang member, Herbert "Cadillac" Catlett, had reformed and been cooperating with the administration to bring about positive change. He tried to reason with the rioting inmates but was murdered. After the hostage situation was resolved, prison warden Fred L. Finkbeiner eulogized Catlett at an African-American church in Chicago Heights.

== Closure ==
Joliet Correctional Center closed as a holding prison in 2002. Budget cuts and the obsolete and dangerous nature of the buildings were the cited reasons. All inmates and most staff were transferred to Stateville Correctional Center, 2.5 miles (4.0 km) to the north-northwest.

On May 30, 2017, one of the buildings (the mattress factory) in Joliet Correctional Center was heavily damaged by fire, the cause of which was later determined to be arson. This is the third building to be severely damaged or destroyed by fire at the facility.

== Reopening ==
Starting in 2018, the Joliet Area Historical Museum began running tours of the penitentiary for Route 66 travelers and other interested parties, billing the location the Old Joliet Prison Historical Site. Different tours are being offered: History, photography/tripod friendly and private tours. The facility was listed on the National Register of Historic Places in 2023.

On April 30, 2026, the prison's baseball field was used for an exhibition game between the Joliet Slammers and Gateway Grizzlies. Approximately 5,500 spectators attended the game.

== See also ==
- List of Illinois state prisons

Preceding station	Alton Railroad	Following station
Joliet toward St. Louis	Main Line	Lockport toward Chicago
