= Summit School District 104 =

School district in Illinois, United States

Address
- 6021 South 74th Avenue Summit, Illinois, 60501; United States

District information
- Type: Public
- Grades: PreK–8
- NCES District ID: 1704050

Students and staff
- Students: 1,586

Other information
- Website: www.sd104.us

Cook County School District 104, also Summit School District 104, is an elementary school district headquartered in the James C. Wrenn Administrative Center in Summit, Illinois in the Chicago metropolitan area. The district serves the following places in Cook County: Summit, Bedford Park, and a section of Bridgeview.

As of 2016 the district has fewer than 250 employees and fewer than 1,800 students.

The district lies due west of the city of Chicago near the Cook County-DuPage County line. The district is composed of five schools: four are elementary schools and the last is a junior high school. All but one of the elementary schools is located within the village of Summit. Students may begin their education as prekindergarteners in Otis Graves Elementary School, which educate students in prekindergarten, kindergarten, and grades one through four. Those who graduate from the fourth grade in Graves, Walker, and Walsh Elementary Schools then spend their fifth grade in Wharton Elementary School. Heritage Junior High School, which serves grades six through eight, is the last school in the district that students will attend.

== History ==
The first school in what would become the district opened in 1864.

Summit School, the base for what would become Summit School District 104, was founded in the late 19th century. The school no longer exists as part of the district; however, the oldest existing active school is Donald Wharton Elementary School, which was founded in 1912 as Argo School. It was later renamed for principal Dr. Donald Wharton, who directed the school in the 1970s. The second oldest school in the district is John Walsh Elementary School, which was founded in 1923; it is named for school board member John D. Walsh. Similarly, Otis Graves Elementary School, which was founded a year later, also was named for a school board member. Walker Elementary School was the most recent of the elementary schools, and was founded in 1934 and named for board member W.W. Walker.

Heritage Junior High School, which was formerly known as Graves Junior High School, was renamed in honor of the Heritage Corridor.

== Schools ==
- Heritage Middle School (Summit)

Elementary schools:

- Otis P. Graves Elementary School (Summit)
- Walker Elementary School (Bedford Park)
- Walsh Elementary School (Summit)
- Wharton Elementary School (Summit)
