= Summit station (Illinois) =

Railroad station in Summit, Illinois

Summit, IL
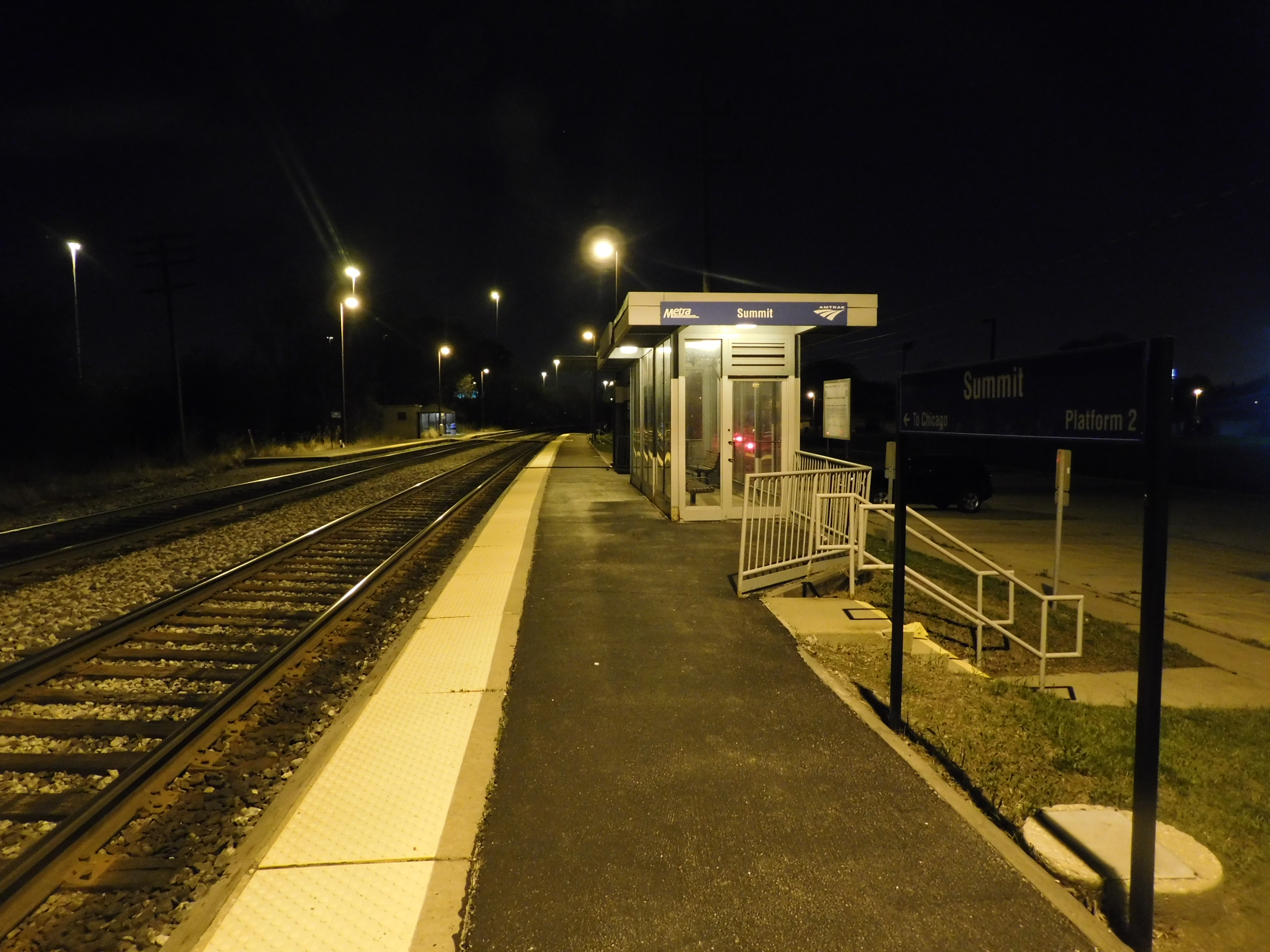
- Summit station in April 2016

General information
- Location: Archer and South Center Avenues; Summit, Illinois; United States
- Coordinates: 41.7760554°N 87.8167849°W
- Owner: Metra
- Line: CN Joliet Subdivision MT2
- Platforms: 2 side platforms
- Tracks: 2
- Connections: Pace

Construction
- Accessible: Yes

Other information
- Station code: Amtrak: SMT
- Fare zone: 2 (Metra)

Passengers
- FY 2025: 19,729 annually (Amtrak)
- 2018: 101 (average weekday) ▲1% (Metra)
- Rank: 187 out of 236 (Metra)

Services
Preceding station	Amtrak	Following station
Joliet toward St. Louis	Lincoln Service	Chicago Terminus
Texas Eagle does not stop here
Preceding station	Metra	Following station
Willow Springs toward Joliet	Heritage Corridor	Union Station Terminus
Former services
Preceding station	Metra	Following station
Willow Springs toward Joliet	Heritage Corridor	Glenn closed 1989 toward Union Station
Preceding station	Alton Railroad	Following station
Argo toward St. Louis	Main Line	Glenn toward Chicago
Track layout
Location

Summit is an Amtrak and Metra train station in Summit, Illinois. It is served by Amtrak Illinois' Lincoln Service, which operates daily, and Metra's Heritage Corridor commuter line, which operates only during morning and evening rush hours in peak direction. Amtrak's Texas Eagle trains also use these tracks but do not stop. It is 11.9 miles (19.2 km) away from Union Station, the northern terminus of the line. In Metra's zone-based fare system, Summit is in zone 2. Summit is also the closest Metra (and Amtrak) station to Midway Airport.

Summit is the only Metra station that is served by a greater number of daily Amtrak trains (four trains per direction throughout the day) than Metra trains (three inbound morning and three outbound evening rush hour trains). This was also a stop for Amtrak's Ann Rutledge until 2006.

The eastbound Lincoln Service only stops at Summit to discharge passengers, while the westbound train stops to discharge and receive passengers.

As of 2018, Summit is the 187th busiest of Metra's 236 non-downtown stations, with an average of 101 weekday boardings.

== Bus connections ==
Pace

- 330 Mannheim-LaGrange
