= Romeoville station (Atchison, Topeka and Santa Fe Railway) =

Coordinates: 41.64028°N 88.06008°W

Romeoville

General information
- Location: Romeoville Road; Romeoville, Illinois
- System: Former AT&SF passenger rail station
- Owner: none (destroyed)
- Tracks: 2

Construction
- Structure type: at-grade

Former services
Preceding station	Atchison, Topeka and Santa Fe Railway	Following station
Lockport toward Los Angeles	Main Line	Lemont toward Chicago
Location

Romeoville station, known as Romeo on timetables, was an Atchison, Topeka and Santa Fe Railway station in the Chicago suburb of Romeoville, Illinois. The station was located near the Illinois and Michigan Canal. Freight trains still pass by the site of the old station, on the double track Southern Transcon Line.

Metra had plans for a new Romeoville station on the Heritage Corridor since the early 21st Century. The station and accompanying parking would be located on the property belonging to the Citgo oil refinery between Lemont and Lockport. In May 2017, Metra went ahead with the plans when they broke ground for the new station in Romeoville. The new Romeoville station opened on February 3, 2018.
