= Romeoville station (Metra) =

Commuter rail station in Romeoville, Illinois

Coordinates: 41.6375°N 88.0493°W

Romeoville

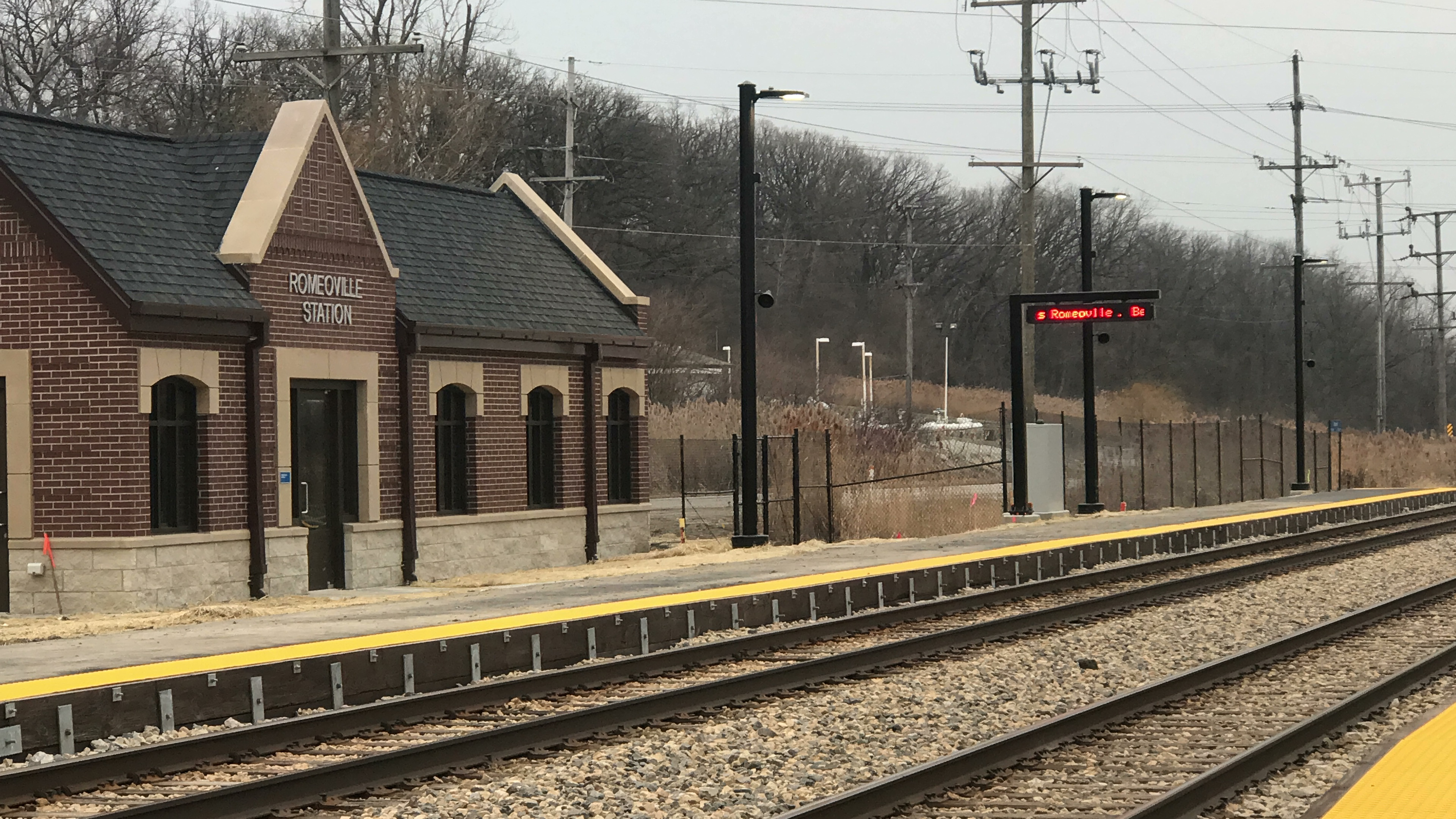

General information
- Location: 899 East Romeo Road; Romeoville, Illinois
- Owner: Metra
- Line: CN Joliet Subdivision
- Platforms: 2 side platforms
- Tracks: 2

Construction
- Parking: 283 spaces
- Accessible: Yes

Other information
- Fare zone: 4

History
- Opened: February 5, 2018

Passengers
- 2018: 148 (average weekday)
- Rank: 170 out of 236

Services
Preceding station	Metra	Following station
Lockport toward Joliet	Heritage Corridor	Lemont toward Union Station
Track layout
Location

Romeoville is a station on Metra's Heritage Corridor at the intersection of 135th Street and New Avenue in Romeoville, Illinois. As of 2018, Romeoville is the 170th busiest of Metra's 236 non-downtown stations, with an average of 148 weekday boardings. As of February 15, 2024, Romeoville is served by three inbound trains in the morning and three outbound trains in the evening on weekdays only.

Romeoville village trustees approved an agreement with the Illinois Department of Transportation for the construction of a new Metra station on the corner of 135th Street and New Avenue on January 7, 2015. The agreement specified that the village of Romeoville would dedicate $550,000 from its Motor Fuel Tax Fund to the project. The state of Illinois would then reimburse the village through a $440,000 Congestion, Mitigation and Air Quality Improvement grant, which would cover 80 percent of the cost. On October 19, 2016, the Illinois Department of Transportation announced that the Romeoville Metra station was selected to receive a $296,700 grant as a part of the Illinois Transportation Enhancement Program. The funds were to help pay for sidewalks, platforms, and a warming shelter in addition to the construction of a nearby access road, and the completion of a multi-use path south of 135th Street with lighting. Construction began in May 2017. The station opened on February 5, 2018.

Previously the Atchison, Topeka and Santa Fe Railway operated a station which served Romeoville.
