= Valley News (disambiguation) =

The Valley News is a daily newspaper published in New Hampshire, United States.

It may also refer to any of the following U.S. newspapers:

- The Valley News (Beaverton, Oregon), 1951–1962 title of the Valley Times
- The Valley News and Green Sheet, the former name (1976–1981) of the Los Angeles Daily News, in California
- The Desplaines Valley News, in suburbs of Chicago, Illinois
- The Ojai Valley News, in Ojai, California
- The Chilkat Valley News, in Alaska

== Other media ==
- Valley News Live – brand name of news coverage of two television stations in Fargo, North Dakota
