= Lockport station (Illinois) =

Rail station in Lockport, Illinois, US

Lockport

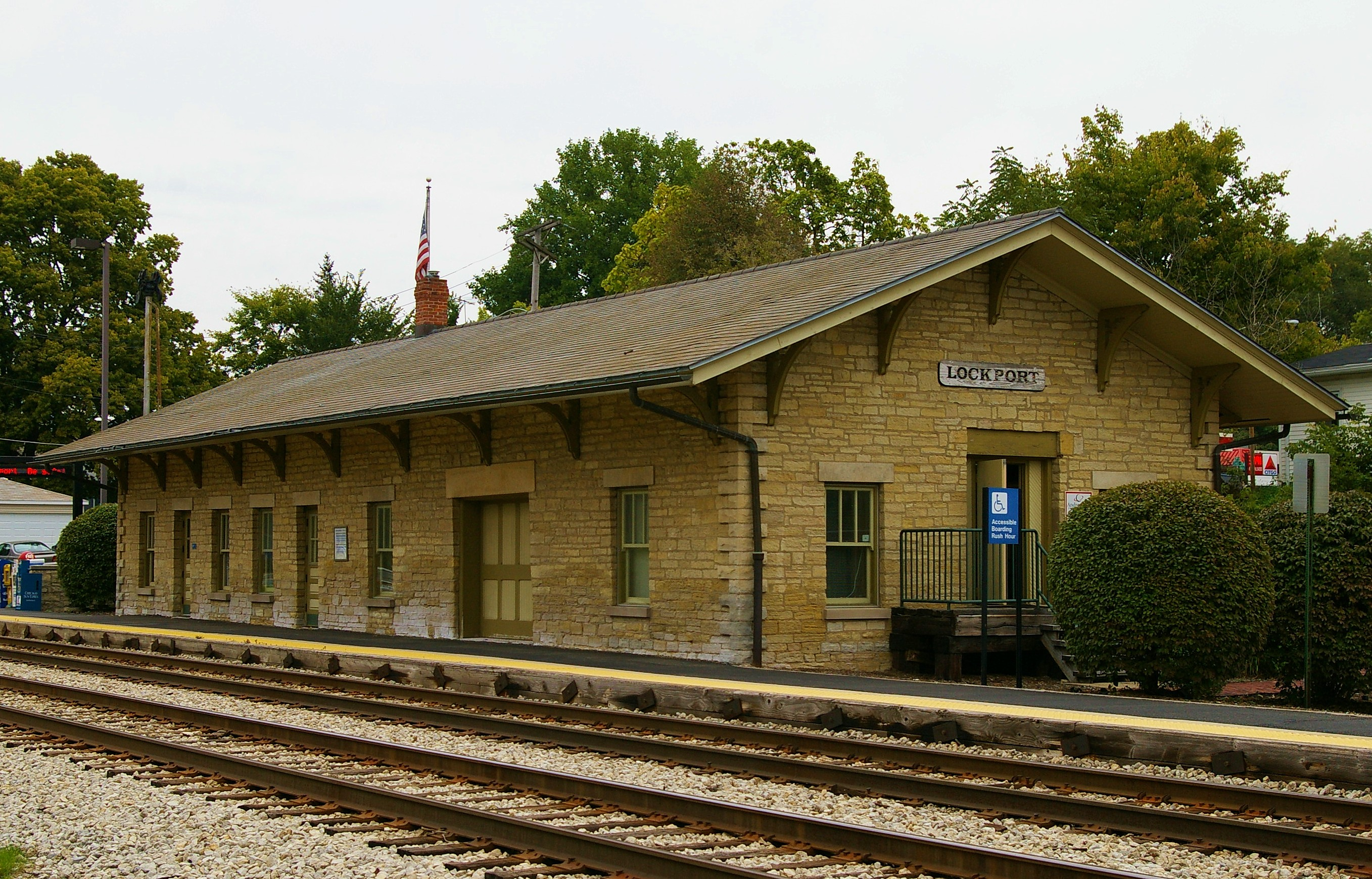

General information
- Location: 13th Street & State Street; Lockport, Illinois
- Coordinates: 41.5851°N 88.0602°W
- Owner: City of Lockport
- Line: CN Joliet Subdivision MT2
- Platforms: 2 side platforms
- Tracks: 2
- Connections: Pace Buses

Construction
- Accessible: Yes

Other information
- Fare zone: 4

History
- Opened: 1863

Passengers
- 2018: 344 (average weekday) ▼16.5%
- Rank: 136 out of 236

Services
Preceding station	Metra	Following station
Joliet Terminus	Heritage Corridor	Romeoville toward Union Station
Former services
Preceding station	Metra	Following station
Joliet Terminus	Heritage Corridor	5th Street closed 1988 toward Union Station
Preceding station	Alton Railroad	Following station
State Prison toward St. Louis	Main Line	Lemont toward Chicago
Track layout
Location

Lockport station is a station on Metra's Heritage Corridor in Lockport, Illinois. The station is 32.9 miles (52.9 km) away from Union Station, the northern terminus of the line. In Metra's zone-based fare system, Lockport is in zone 4. As of 2018, Lockport is the 136th busiest of Metra's 236 non-downtown stations, with an average of 344 weekday boardings. As of February 15, 2024, Lockport is served by three inbound trains in the morning and three outbound trains in the evening on weekdays only.

Lockport station was originally built in 1863 by the Chicago and Alton Railroad. The tracks run parallel to the Illinois and Michigan Canal, and shares the right-of-way with Amtrak's Lincoln Service and Texas Eagle trains, however, no Amtrak trains stop here.

Three blocks east of the station is the meeting place of the Blackhawk Chapter of the National Railroad Historical Society at the Gladys Fox Museum.

== Bus connections ==
Pace

- 834 Joliet/Downers Grove
