= Millsdale, Illinois =

Millsdale
- Ghost town
- Location of Millsdale within Illinois
- Coordinates: 41°26′06″N 88°09′51″W
- Country: United States
- State: Illinois
- County: Will
- Elevation: 522 ft (159 m)

Population (1903)
  - Total: 25
- Time zone: UTC-6 (CST)
  - Summer (DST): UTC-5 (CDT)

Millsdale is an abandoned village located in Channahon Township, Will County, Illinois, United States. In 1903, it had a population of 25. In 1946, it had a population of 20. The Santa Fe Railway stopped at Millsdale Station.
