= Desplaines Valley News =

Weekly newspaper

- Type: Weekly newspaper
- Format: Broadsheet
- Owner: Bob Nichol
- Publisher: Desplaines Valley News Pub. Co.
- Editor: Bob Bong
- Founded: 1913
- Language: American English
- Headquarters: Lemont, Cook County, Illinois, United States)
- Circulation: 2,800
- OCLC number: 31163834
- Website: desplainesvalleynews.com

The Desplaines Valley News is the self-proclaimed "newspaper of record" for the Southwest Suburban Chicago communities of Bedford Park, Bridgeview, Brookfield, Countryside, Hodgkins, Indian Head Park, Justice, La Grange Highlands, Lyons, McCook, Summit and Willow Springs. Southwest Community News Group publishes the newspaper Thursday of each week.

Founded on October 18, 1913 by A.S. Bushkevitz, the Desplaines Valley News became a fixture heralding the news of local interest to the communities surrounding the historic Illinois and Michigan Canal. Beginning with Bushkevitz and continuing through to the present day the editors of the Desplaines Valley News have also used the newspaper as a vehicle for bolstering and publicizing local business.

Bushkevits described his vision for the paper this way:

To the Residents, Business Men And General Public, We have come into your town with a Newspaper Enterprise to stay, if you will stand by us. We have asked for no bonus, nor do we intend to do so; but all we ask of you is that you give us your Patronage in the way of Job Work, Advertising, Subscription and good will. If you will give us all your work and subscribe for our Paper we will do our best to please you, and will assure you that this will be the People’s Paper. We will advocate the patronage of Home Industries, and we would like to have you do likewise. It is up to you to keep this Paper before you for much good.

== The News under Noonan ==
In 1986 the Desplaines Valley News was purchased by the soft-spoken, chain-smoking, former copy boy turned editor, John C. Noonan. Under the Bridgeport, Chicago native’s leadership, the Desplaines Valley News was transformed into a kind of “working school” for aspiring local journalists.

When he was 15 years old, Noonan went to work for the Bridgeport News and got his first exposure to print journalism. While attending DeLaSalle High School, Noonan was able to get a job as a copy boy at the Chicago Tribune. Some time later he was moved to the Tribune’s rewrite desk, and in 1961 Noonan became a beat reporter with the City News Bureau of Chicago. Noonan spent seven years at City News, where he was overnight city editor and broadcast editor.

During his 14-year tenure at the Desplaines Valley News, Noonan exposed a new generation of reporters to the “City News” style of journalism, training wide-eyed upstarts to think like beat reporters – be tenacious, make friends, obtain much information and make sure it’s good. Noonan brought the City News maxim, “If your mother says she loves you, check it out,” to Summit, Illinois.

In addition to running the Desplaines Valley News, Noonan also ran for Illinois Senate in the 24th District in 1992. He was defeated in the Democratic Party primary, but garnered nearly 10,000 votes.

John Noonan died on Sunday, October 15, 2000 at Hinsdale Hospital, Hinsdale, Illinois, of lung cancer at the age of 58, following a short illness.

== The News Today ==
The Desplaines Valley News was sold in November 2012 to Southwest Community News Group.
