= The Midnight Special (train) =

Former passenger train between Chicago and St. Louis

Midnight Special
Overview
- Service type: Inter-city rail
- Status: Discontinued
- Locale: Illinois
- Last service: April 30, 1971
- Former operators: Alton Railroad; Gulf, Mobile & Ohio Railroad

Route
- Termini: St. Louis Union Station, Missouri; Chicago Union Station, Illinois
- Distance travelled: 284 mi (457 km)

Technical
- Track gauge: 4 ft 8 1/2 in (1,435 mm)

The Midnight Special was the name of a passenger train formerly operated by the Chicago and Alton Railroad and its successor, the Gulf, Mobile and Ohio Railroad. The train departed Union Station in St. Louis, Missouri, at 11:30 p.m. nightly and arrived at Union Station in Chicago, Illinois, at 7 a.m. the following day. In the heyday of overnight travel, from 1920 through the end of World War II, the Midnight Specials were all Pullman Co. trains carrying no coaches and as many as 12 sleeping cars.

On December 29/30, 1968, the Midnight Special carried 19 passengers on the last Pullman sleeping car trip between Chicago, Illinois, and St. Louis, Missouri. Operations of the Pullman Company sleeper cars ceased and all leases were terminated on December 31, 1968. On January 1, 1969, the Pullman Company was dissolved and all assets were liquidated. (The most visible result on many railroads, including Union Pacific, was that the Pullman name was removed from the letterboard of all Pullman-owned cars.) An auction of all Pullman remaining assets was held at the Pullman plant in Chicago in early 1970. The Pullman, Inc., company remained in place until 1981 or 1982 to close out all remaining liabilities and claims, operating from an office in Denver. The Midnight Special made its final run on April 30, 1971, although Amtrak continued several other passenger trains over the same route traversed by the Midnight Special.
