= Millsdale station =

Millsdale

General information
- Location: trackside, Millsdale, Illinois
- Coordinates: 41°26′06″N 88°09′51″W
- System: Former AT&SF passenger rail station
- Owner: land owned by the United States Government
- Tracks: 2

Construction
- Structure type: at-grade

Former services
Preceding station	Atchison, Topeka and Santa Fe Railway	Following station
Drummond toward Los Angeles	Main Line	Joliet toward Chicago
Location

Millsdale station was an Atchison, Topeka and Santa Fe Railway station in the ghost town of Millsdale, Illinois. It was located on the east bank of the Des Plaines River, and had two tracks passing through. The station is on the BNSF Chillicothe Subdivision and freight trains still pass by the site of the former depot.
