= Heritage Corridor =

Metra commuter rail service in the Chicago area

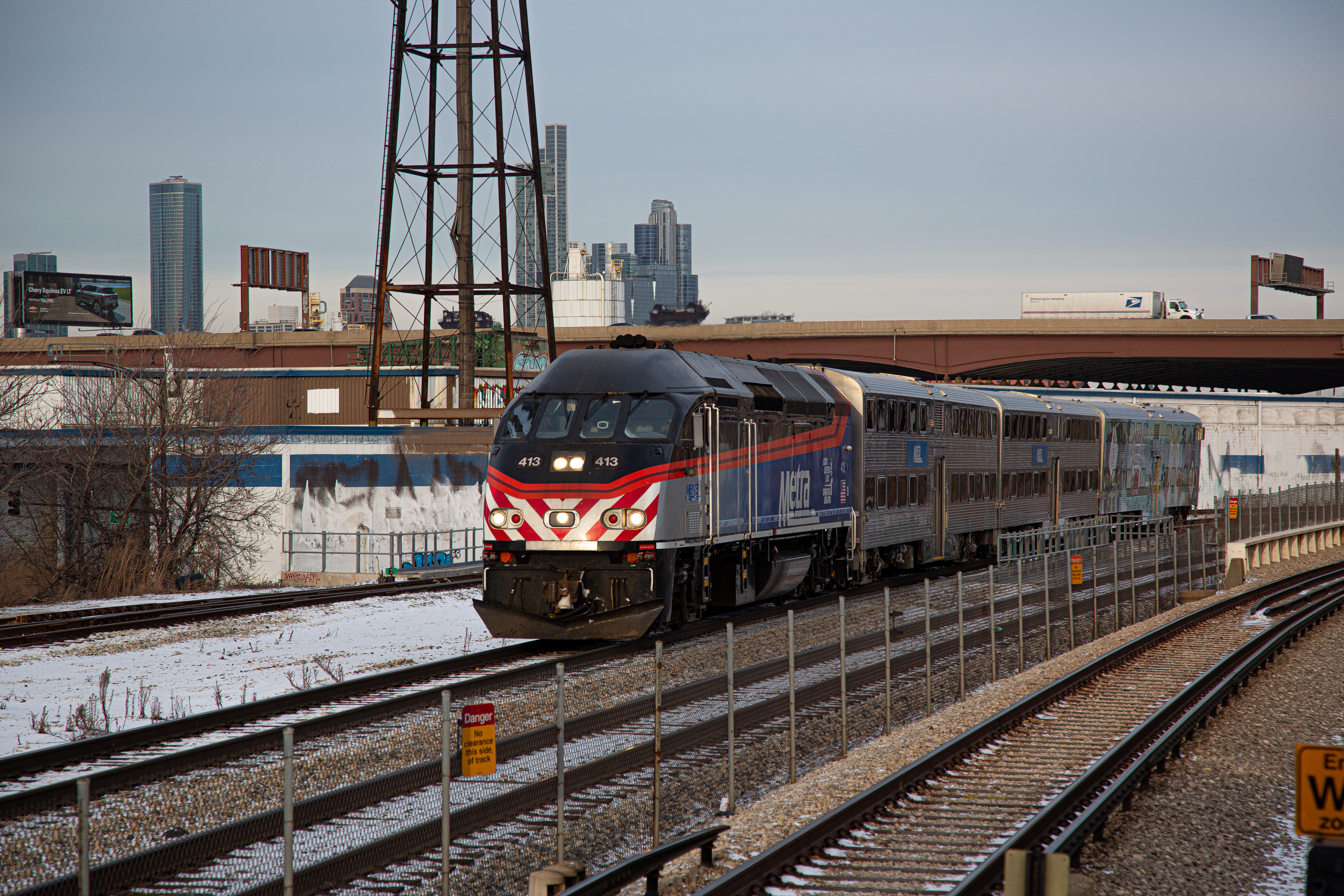
- Heritage Corridor train in Chicago, January 2025

Overview
- Owner: Canadian National Railway
- Termini: Union Station; Joliet
- Stations: 7

Service
- Type: Commuter rail
- System: Metra
- Operator(s): Metra, Canadian National Railway
- Daily ridership: 2,400 (Avg. Weekday 2016)
- Ridership: 337,399 (2025)

Technical
- Line length: 37.3 mi (60.0 km)
- Number of tracks: 2
- Track gauge: 4 ft 8 1/2 in (1,435 mm) standard gauge
Route map
Heritage Corridor highlighted in maroon
Key

The Heritage Corridor (HC) is a Metra commuter rail line in Chicago, Illinois, and its southwestern suburbs, terminating in Joliet, Illinois. While Metra does not refer to its lines by colors, the Heritage Corridor appears on Metra timetables as "Alton Maroon," after the Alton Railroad, which ran trains on this route. The name Heritage Corridor refers to the Illinois and Michigan Canal Heritage Corridor. Established in 1984, it runs parallel to the line.

Unlike other Metra lines, the Heritage Corridor runs during weekday rush hours only in the peak direction–to Chicago in the morning and Joliet in the afternoon, with the trip from Joliet to Union Station taking about 1 hour and 7 minutes. The Rock Island District also serves Joliet with 21 trains.

As of February 15, 2024, Metra operates six trains (three in each direction) on the Heritage Corridor on weekdays, with each train serving all stations on the route. All inbound trains originate from Joliet in the morning, and all outbound trains terminate at Joliet in the afternoon. Except for occasional seasonal excursion services, there is no Saturday service. There is currently no off-peak, Sunday, or holiday service on the Heritage Corridor.

The Heritage Corridor has the lowest train frequency and fewest number of stations of any Metra line.

Like the North Central Service and the SouthWest Service, all stations on the route are fully ADA-accessible.

== Route ==
The line runs from Union Station in downtown Chicago through southwestern suburbs to Joliet. In March 2016, the public timetable shows four Chicago to Joliet trains each weekday. An additional train runs inbound during the afternoon rush hour but as an empty equipment move or deadhead.

Amtrak's Texas Eagle and Lincoln Service use these tracks from Union Station to Joliet, as do Canadian National freight trains, with CN being the owner of the tracks on which the corridor runs. The Texas Eagle only stops at Chicago and Joliet, while the Lincoln Service also stops at Summit. The Joliet Transportation Center replaced Joliet Union Station on April 11, 2018.

On May 16, 2017, Metra announced that the new station for Romeoville had officially broken ground near the intersection of 135th St and New Avenue. The cost of the new station is estimated to be around $4.9 million. The station was opened to the public on February 5, 2018.

Metra has included the possibility of extending the Heritage Corridor in their Cost Benefit Analysis report. If this were to happen, the Heritage Corridor would continue south from Joliet to Wilmington, with an additional station in Elwood.

=== Excursion service ===
Metra has offered "Rails, Trails, and Ales" excursion service on Saturdays in the fall of 2021; 2023; and 2024, and the summer of 2022. In 2021, two trains in each direction made all stops between Union Station and Joliet from September 18 to October 16. In 2022, three trains in each direction made all stops between Union Station and Joliet from July 2 to September 3. In 2023, three trains in each direction made all stops between Union Station and Joliet from September 9 to October 14. In 2024, three trains in each direction made all stops between Union Station and Joliet from September 7 to October 12.

Rails, Trails, and Ales service did not return in 2025.

== Ridership ==
Between 2014 and 2019 annual ridership remained steady at roughly 730,000. Due to the COVID-19 pandemic, ridership dropped to 177,838 passengers in 2020 and to 82,197 passengers in 2021. The line's 337,399 riders in 2025 made it the eleventh and least used Metra line

== Stations ==
County	Zone	Location	Station	Connections and notes
Cook	1	Chicago	Union Station	Amtrak (long-distance): California Zephyr, Cardinal, City of New Orleans, Empire Builder, Floridian, Lake Shore Limited, Southwest Chief, Texas Eagle; Amtrak (intercity): Blue Water, Borealis, Hiawatha, Illini and Saluki, Illinois Zephyr and Carl Sandburg, Lincoln Service, Pere Marquette, Wolverine; Metra: BNSF, Milwaukee District North, Milwaukee District West, North Central Service, SouthWest Service; Chicago "L": Blue (at Clinton), Brown Orange Pink Purple (at Quincy); CTA buses: 1 7 J14 19 28 56 60 120 121 124 125 126 128 130 151 156 157 192; Pace: 755; Amtrak Thruway: Chicago–Madison and Chicago–Rockford (Van Galder), Chicago–Louisville (Greyhound)
Cook		Chicago	23rd Street	Closed 1902, replaced with Halsted Street
Cook		Chicago	Halsted Street	Closed 1984
Cook		Chicago	Brighton Park	Closed 1984
Cook		Central Stickney	Glenn	Closed 1989
Cook	2	Summit	Summit	Amtrak: Lincoln Service; Pace: 330
Cook		Willow Springs	Mt. Forest	Closed
Cook	3	Willow Springs	Willow Springs	Pace: 390
Cook		Lemont	Lambert	Closed
Cook	3	Lemont	Lemont	Pace: 755
Will	4	Romeoville	Romeoville	Pace: 755
Will		Lockport	5th Street	Closed 1988
Will	4	Lockport	Lockport	Pace: 755, 834
Will		Joliet	State Prison	Closed
Will	4	Joliet	Joliet	Amtrak: Lincoln Service, Texas Eagle; Metra: Rock Island; Pace: 501, 504, 505, 507, 508, 509, 511, 832, 834
