= Joliet Gateway Center =

Transit hub in Illinois

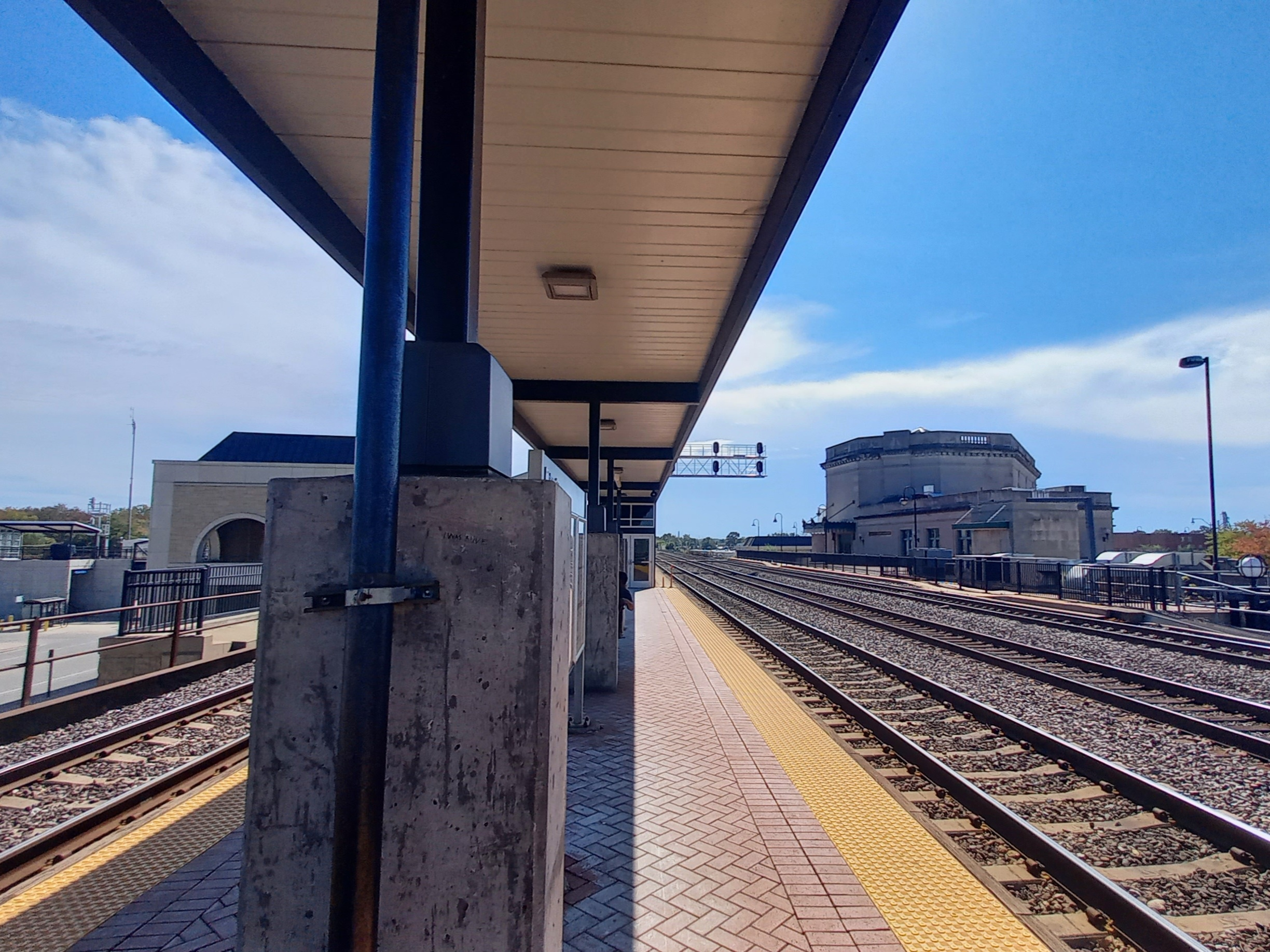
- Amtrak/Heritage Corridor platform in September 2024. The station building is visible to the left, and the old Union Station can be seen to the right.

General information
- Location: 90 East Jefferson Street; Joliet, Illinois; United States
- Coordinates: 41°31′28″N 88°04′44″W
- Lines: CN Joliet Subdivision (Amtrak/HC); Joliet Subdistrict (RI)
- Platforms: 1 island platform (Amtrak/HC); 1 side platform (RI)
- Tracks: 2 (Amtrak/HC), 1 (RI)
- Connections: Pace: 501, 504, 505, 507, 508, 509, 511, 512, 832, 834

Construction
- Parking: 910 spaces, 29 accessible spaces
- Accessible: Yes

Other information
- Station code: Amtrak: JOL
- Fare zone: 4 (Metra)

History
- Opened: 2014 (temporary structure); 2018 (full structure)

Passengers
- FY 2025: 69,420 annually (Amtrak)
- 2018: 996 (avg. weekday) ▲1.9% (Metra)
- Rank: 51 out of 236 (Metra)

Services
| Preceding station | Amtrak | Following station |
|---|---|---|
| Dwight toward St. Louis | Lincoln Service | Summit toward Chicago |
| Pontiac toward Los Angeles or San Antonio | Texas Eagle | Chicago Terminus |
| Preceding station | Metra | Following station |
| Terminus | Heritage Corridor | Lockport toward Union Station |
| Terminus | Rock Island | New Lenox toward LaSalle |
Track layout
Key
Location

Joliet Gateway Center is a multimodal mass transit center in downtown Joliet, Illinois. It opened in 2018, replacing the nearby Joliet Union Station as the commuter and passenger train station serving Joliet.

The station is the terminus of the Metra Rock Island District and Heritage Corridor, and an intermediate stop for the Amtrak Texas Eagle and Lincoln Service trains. The station's bus terminal opened in 2021, and serves 10 Pace bus routes.

== History ==
The first passenger train services to Joliet began in 1852, and the city quickly grew into a railroad hub. A railroad improvement project began in 1909, which removed grade crossings and constructed a new union station to replace multiple stations in Joliet. Joliet Union Station opened in 1912, and at its peak served over 100 trains per day. Passenger train traffic to Union Station declined in the late 20th century, but freight traffic increased, and Union Station was operationally deficient after the tunnels connecting its platforms to the station building were filled in. Following the revisions, freight trains on the north-south tracks through the station were required to stop while passenger trains boarded, which led to conflicts.

The city of Joliet applied for a TIGER grant to improve its passenger station facilities in 2009, and received additional funding from the state of Illinois, BNSF, and the city of Joliet. Union Station closed in September 2014, replaced by temporary facilities. Groundbreaking for the new replacement station took place late in 2016, with construction beginning shortly afterward. After several delays, the station building officially opened on April 11, 2018.

The original plans for Joliet Gateway Center included a bus terminal, which was omitted from the project following cost overruns. Pace committed additional funding for the construction of the bus station, and construction began in early 2021, over 10 years since the project's proposal. The bus terminal opened in December 2021.

== Services ==
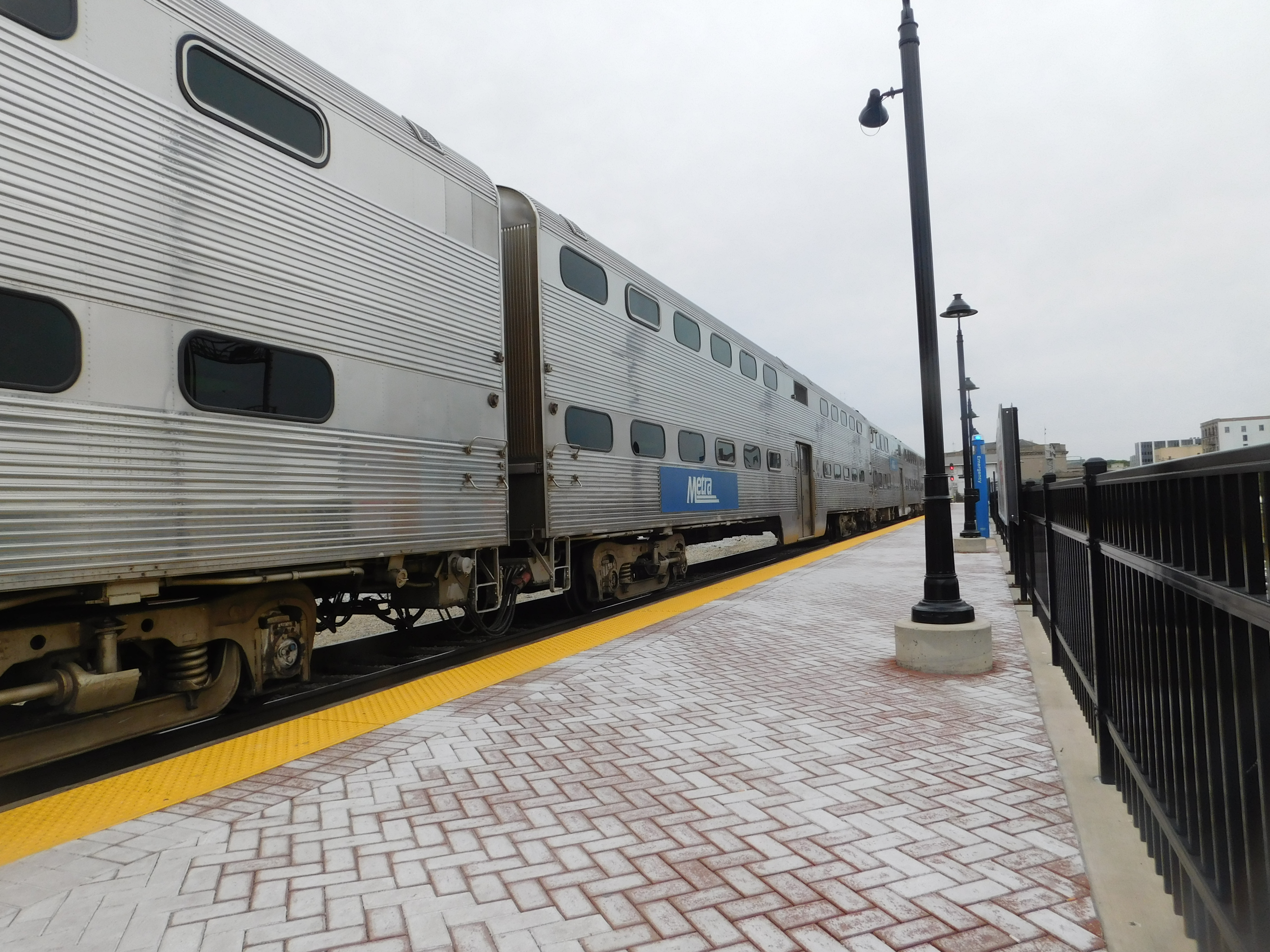
Rock Island platform

Joliet Gateway Center is the terminus of the Metra Rock Island District and Heritage Corridor lines, to Chicago LaSalle Street Station and Chicago Union Station respectively. It is an intermediate stop on the Amtrak Texas Eagle from Chicago Union to San Antonio and Los Angeles, and on the Lincoln Service from Chicago to St. Louis and Kansas City.

As of 2018, Joliet is the 51st busiest of Metra's 236 non-downtown stations, with an average of 996 weekday boardings.

As of the November 2023 timetable, Joliet is served by 42 Rock Island District trains (21 in each direction) on weekdays, 21 trains (ten inbound, eleven outbound) on Saturdays, and 16 trains (eight in each direction) on Sundays and holidays. On weekdays, the station is also served by three inbound Heritage Corridor trains in the morning and three outbound trains in the evening.

For Amtrak, as of 2024, Joliet is served by eight Lincoln Service trains (four in each direction) and two Texas Eagle trains (one in each direction), every day.

The Joliet Gateway Center is 37.2 miles (59.9 km) from Chicago Union Station on Metra's Heritage Corridor, and 40 miles (64.4 km) from Chicago's LaSalle Street Station on the Rock Island District. It is the only Metra station outside of its Chicago stations where two lines terminate. In Metra's zone-based fare system, Joliet is in zone 4 on both lines.

=== Future services ===
Amtrak announced a proposal to improve its Texas Eagle and Lincoln Service trains in 2022. The Amtrak trains, along with the Metra Heritage Corridor, currently use the CN Joliet Subdivision from Joliet to Chicago. Train traffic on the Joliet Subdivision causes frequent delays to Amtrak trains, and Amtrak proposed to reroute the Texas Eagle and Lincoln Service over the Rock Island District. Metra owns and manages the Rock Island District, and it sees little freight traffic, making it an attractive route for Amtrak.

To operate Amtrak trains over the Rock Island District, modifications would be required in Joliet and Chicago. A third platform would need to be constructed at Joliet Gateway Center, and Amtrak would need to improve the connection between the Rock Island District and Chicago Union Station. The current connection from the Rock Island District to Union Station via the St. Charles Air Line sees occasional use during maintenance and emergencies, but it limits trains to a maximum speed of 5 mph (8 km/h) and requires trains to reverse into Union Station.

== Connections ==
- Pace Bus routes 504, 505, 508, 509, 511, 512, 832, 834
