= Lemont, Illinois =

- Village
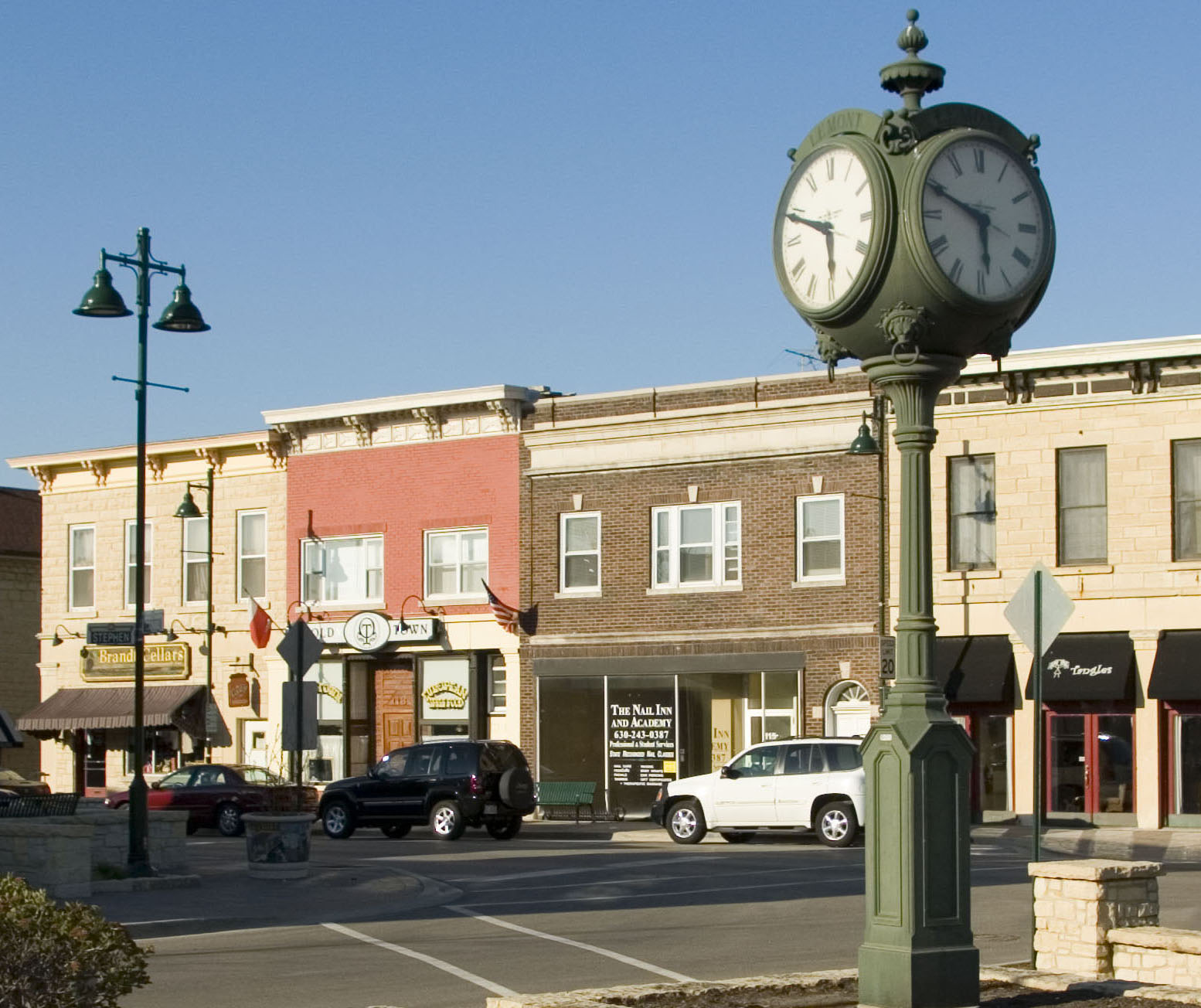
- Budnik Plaza clock and Stephen Street facades in historic downtown Lemont

- Seal
- Etymology: From French for "The Mount"
- Motto: Village of Faith
- Location of Lemont in DuPage County, Illinois
- Coordinates: 41°40′04″N 88°00′12″W
- Country: United States
- State: Illinois
- County: Cook, Will, and DuPage
- Township: Lemont, Downers Grove, DuPage, Homer
- Settled: 1836
- Incorporated: June 9, 1873

Government
  - Village President: John Egofske

Area
  - Total: 8.74 sq mi (22.64 km^{2})
  - Land: 8.37 sq mi (21.67 km^{2})
  - Water: 0.37 sq mi (0.97 km^{2})
- Elevation: 738 ft (225 m)

Population (2020)
  - Total: 17,629
  - Density: 2,107/sq mi (813.7/km^{2})
- Time zone: UTC-6 (CST)
  - Summer (DST): UTC-5 (CDT)
- ZIP codes: 60439, 60490
- Area codes: 630/331
- FIPS code: 17-42795
- GNIS feature ID: 2398417
- Website: lemont.il.us

Lemont is a village located in Cook, DuPage, and Will counties in the U.S. state of Illinois, and is a south-west suburb of Chicago. The population was 17,629 as of the 2020 census. The village is situated on a hillside along the south banks of the Des Plaines River. It overlooks Waterfall Glen's Midwestern Bluff Savanna on the opposite side. The Lemont area is home to Argonne National Laboratory and other heavy industrial sites, and has a substantial European immigrant population.

== History ==
Before European settlers arrived in Lemont, Native Americans traveled the Des Plaines River in birch bark canoes on trading trips between the Mississippi River and Lake Michigan. The native Potawatomi lived off the land in this area, directly using natural resources for food, shelter, clothing and medicine. In the 18th century, French voyageurs traveled down the Des Plaines River, trading Native Americans metal, beads and cloth for animal furs.

Lemont was originally known as Keepataw (after a Potawatomi chief) and a post office was established in 1840 as Keepatau. After that, it was named Athens and then Palmyra. The name Lemont (literally, 'the mountain' in French) was chosen in 1850 at the suggestion of Lemuel Brown, the postmaster and justice of the peace, or perhaps by his brother Nathaniel Brown.

Established in 1836, the village of Lemont stands as one of the oldest American communities in northeastern Illinois. It is historically significant for its role in transforming the northern region of the state from a sparsely settled frontier to a commercial, agricultural, and industrial region that supplied Chicago and areas beyond with commodities. Lemont is also unique in boasting an authentic historic district that remains intact and has been continually used since the 19th century. In 2016, the Lemont Downtown Historic District was listed on the National Register of Historic Places.

Both Lemont's history and architectural uniqueness connect to the Illinois and Michigan Canal (I&M Canal). Construction of the I&M Canal began in 1837 and stands as one of the last major canal undertakings in the United States (the Hennepin Canal opened in 1907). When it was completed in 1848, it provided a continuous waterway stretching from New York (through the Erie Canal, Lake Erie, Lake Huron and Lake Michigan to Chicago, then through the I&M Canal for 97 miles (156 km) entering the Illinois River at La Salle, Illinois, to the Mississippi River, to New Orleans) to the Gulf of Mexico.

Immigrant workers, mostly Irish, settled in Lemont to work on the canal and later moved along the corridor of the canal, improving farms within the many communities that sprang up along it.

In digging, workers discovered Lemont yellow dolomite, a harder and finer grained version of limestone. This delayed digging of the canal, but was the start of the area's second industry, quarrying. By the mid-19th century, limestone quarrying took over as the main economic factor in Lemont and sustained its growth. The town's important major buildings were faced with the Lemont limestone, abundant in local quarries. Today, 38 of those buildings remain as the Lemont downtown district. Lemont limestone was used to build the Chicago Water Tower, a building that "gained special significance as one of the few buildings to survive the destructive path of the Great Chicago Fire of 1871". In the early years, this stone was known as "Athens Marble" as a nod to its place of origin. An 1859 item in the Chicago Daily Tribune had this to say: “The Athens and DesPlaines quarries, situated on the Illinois and Michigan canal, embrace 335 acres of the finest stone in the West, known as “Athens Marble”. This stone has a high reputation for color, durability and beauty, which renders it quite an article of commerce”.

Cargo and passengers were transported on the I&M until the early 20th century, when the wider, deeper Chicago Sanitary and Ship Canal was built parallel to it. The Sanitary Canal is still used today as part of the Illinois Waterway system.

Lemont's motto is "Village of Faith", and its church spires reflect the many ethnic groups who came here to quarry stone, dig the Sanitary and Ship Canal and work in other industries.

Lemont is credited with being the largest recruiting station for the Union Army during the American Civil War, and the Old Stone Church, built in 1861 of limestone, was used as a recruiting depot. It served as the Lemont Methodist Episcopal Church for 100 years, from 1861 until 1970, when it became home to the Lemont Area Historical Society. The oldest building in Lemont, it now serves as a museum and is listed on the National Register of Historic Places.

During the Civil War, Lemont was required to sign up 33 soldiers, the village recruited 293 soldiers; only 63 returned. The Lemont Civil War Memorial Committee was formed to build a memorial to honor Lemont's Civil War veterans. The monument was dedicated in 2008 in Legion Park at the east end of Main Street, opposite the Metra Station. Of the 293 soldiers sent to fight in the war, only 243 names of the enlisted soldiers are known. Among them is Cpl. John Warden, the only Lemont resident ever awarded the Medal of Honor.

By 1854, railroads transported goods faster than water, and the I&M became obsolete as Lemont evolved into a railroad community; the village was incorporated on June 9, 1873.

Increasingly, the canal was used to carry wastes away from Chicago. In 1900, the larger Sanitary and Ship Canal went into operation, carrying both wastes and larger, more modern barges. All use of the I&M Canal ended in 1933, with the opening of the canal's modern successor—the Illinois Waterway.

By about 1920, the quarries declined as styles changed and builders began to use Bedford limestone from Indiana and less expensive materials like concrete.

During World War II, the Metallurgical Laboratory of the University of Chicago moved into the nearby Argonne Forest preserves to carry out Enrico Fermi's work on nuclear reactors for the Manhattan Project. After the war, Argonne National Laboratory was designated as the first national laboratory in the United States on July 1, 1946.

In 1984, President Ronald Reagan signed legislation establishing the Illinois & Michigan Canal National Heritage Corridor as the nation's first National Heritage Corridor. The status recognizes the historic importance of this region and the waterway that connected Lake Michigan and the Illinois River. Today, it is a 100-mile-long (160 km) cultural park between Chicago and LaSalle/Peru, representing an ongoing partnership between the public and private sectors created to achieve a successful mixture of preservation, public use and industrial activity.

Sacred architecture is a strong suit of Lemont, whose skyline is dominated by two landmark religious edifices: the Hindu Temple of Greater Chicago and SS. Cyril and Methodius church in the Polish Cathedral style. Both are situated on the sides of hills, giving an even more dramatic backdrop to their monumental architecture.

=== Tornadoes ===
On June 13, 1976, at 5:18 PM, a killer tornado struck Lemont and took three lives. 23 were injured, 87 homes were destroyed and 82 more were damaged. Damage to the high school alone was estimated at $500,000 (equivalent to $2,830,000 in 2025). Many people reported watching neighbors' homes explode, implode, shattering before their eyes. Cited as an unusual tornado, it backed up on its path before heading North, somewhat parallel to its path of origin. See Tornadoes of 1976 for more information on the outbreak.

On March 27, 1991, Lemont was again hit by a tornado. See Tornadoes of 1991 for more information on the outbreak.

== Geography ==
According to the 2021 census gazetteer files, Lemont has a total area of 8.74 square miles (22.64 km^{2}), of which 8.37 square miles (21.68 km^{2}) (or 95.71%) is land and 0.38 square miles (0.98 km^{2}) (or 4.29%) is water.

The village has 10 exclaves.

== Demographics ==
Historical population
Census	Pop.	Note	%±
1880	2,108		—
1900	2,449		—
1910	2,284		−6.7%
1920	2,322		1.7%
1930	2,582		11.2%
1940	2,557		−1.0%
1950	2,757		7.8%
1960	3,397		23.2%
1970	5,080		49.5%
1980	5,640		11.0%
1990	7,348		30.3%
2000	13,098		78.3%
2010	16,000		22.2%
2020	17,629		10.2%
U.S. Decennial Census; 2010 2020

=== Racial and ethnic composition ===
Lemont village, Illinois – racial and ethnic composition Note: the US Census treats Hispanic/Latino as an ethnic category. This table excludes Latinos from the racial categories and assigns them to a separate category. Hispanics/Latinos may be of any race.
Race / ethnicity (NH = Non-Hispanic)	Pop. 2000	Pop. 2010	Pop. 2020	% 2000	% 2010	% 2020
White alone (NH)	12,469	14,719	15,370	95.20%	91.99%	87.19%
Black or African American alone (NH)	39	58	147	0.30%	0.36%	0.83%
Native American or Alaska Native alone (NH)	12	9	2	0.09%	0.06%	0.01%
Asian alone (NH)	107	258	422	0.82%	1.61%	2.39%
Native Hawaiian or Pacific Islander alone (NH)	3	2	6	0.02%	0.01%	0.03%
Other race alone (NH)	7	4	23	0.05%	0.03%	0.13%
Mixed race or multiracial (NH)	68	128	404	0.52%	0.80%	2.29%
Hispanic or Latino (any race)	393	822	1,255	3.00%	5.14%	7.12%
Total	13,098	16,000	17,629	100.00%	100.00%	100.00%

=== 2020 census ===
As of the 2020 census, there were 17,629 people, 6,565 households, and 4,606 families residing in the village. The population density was 2,017.05 inhabitants per square mile (778.79/km^{2}).

The median age was 44.0 years. 21.9% of residents were under the age of 18 and 19.6% were 65 years of age or older. For every 100 females, there were 95.2 males, and for every 100 females age 18 and over there were 92.4 males age 18 and over.

100.0% of residents lived in urban areas, while 0.0% lived in rural areas.

Of households in Lemont, 32.2% had children under the age of 18 living in them. Of all households, 62.7% were married-couple households, 12.3% had a male householder with no spouse or partner present, and 20.9% had a female householder with no spouse or partner present. About 22.1% of all households were made up of individuals, and 12.4% had someone living alone who was 65 years of age or older.

There were 6,773 housing units, of which 3.1% were vacant. The homeowner vacancy rate was 0.7% and the rental vacancy rate was 3.9%. Housing unit density was 774.94 per square mile (299.21/km^{2}).

=== Income and poverty ===
The median income for a household in the village was $114,509, and the median income for a family was $133,456. Males had a median income of $75,542 versus $43,283 for females. The per capita income for the village was $45,675. About 4.4% of families and 5.1% of the population were below the poverty line, including 5.9% of those under age 18 and 5.3% of those age 65 or over.

== Sports ==
Lemont has been represented in youth and high school athletics at the regional and national levels. In 2006, the Lemont Little League All-Star team advanced to the Little League World Series in South Williamsport, Pennsylvania, where it finished fourth, and was honored with a community parade upon returning home.

The BMW Championship (PGA Tour), and its predecessor the Western Open, were held at Cog Hill Golf & Country Club in Lemont Township between 1991 and 2007 and again from 2009 to 2011.

Lemont High School has achieved success in Illinois High School Association (IHSA) competition, including state championships in cheerleading, baseball, softball, and wrestling. The school’s cheerleading program has won IHSA state titles in 2009, 2010, 2011, 2014, 2017, 2018, 2024, and 2025. The program has also maintained a state-record streak of consecutive IHSA state finals appearances as of 2026. Other team championships include baseball (2014, 2016), wrestling (2020), and softball (2022, 2023).

== Education ==
The school district covering the parts of Lemont in Cook County include Lemont-Bromberek Combined School District 113A (elementary school) and Lemont Township High School District 210.

Two National Blue Ribbon Schools are located in Lemont, recognized by the US Department of Education for excellence in student achievement. Lemont High School received the Blue Ribbon award in 2017. Saints Cyril and Methodius School received the Blue Ribbon award in 2019.

Public schools in Lemont include:

- River Valley Elementary School
- Oakwood Elementary School
- Central School
- Old Quarry Middle School
- Lemont High School

A portion of Lemont in Will County is within the Valley View Community Unit School District 365U. Portions of Lemont in DuPage County extend into other districts.

Private/parochial schools: (the Roman Catholic Archdiocese of Chicago is responsible for Catholic schools)

- St. Alphonsus/St. Patrick
- SS. Cyril & Methodius:
- Everest Academy
- Montessori School of Lemont
- Žiburėlis Lithuanian Montessori School
- Polska Szkoła Jana Pawła II Polish School

== Media ==
Productions filmed in Lemont include:

- Save the Last Dance
- The Hunter (1980)
- Straight Talk (1992)
- Children on Their Birthdays (2002)
- Witless Protection
- Chain Reaction (1996)

== Infrastructure ==
=== Transportation ===
Lemont has a station on Metra's Heritage Corridor, which provides weekday rail service between Joliet and Chicago Union Station.

In 2007, the Interstate 355 tollway extension opened, providing Lemont with more direct access to the Chicago expressway system. An interchange is located on 127th Street.

== Notable people ==
- Diablo Cody, writer of the film Juno, raised in Lemont
- Scott Darling, former goaltender for the Chicago Blackhawks
- Clayton Fejedelem, safety for the Miami Dolphins and Cincinnati Bengals.
- Coby Fleener, former tight end for the New Orleans Saints and Indianapolis Colts, born in Lemont
- Garrett Gilkey, former NFL offensive lineman, born in Lemont
- Steve Grand, country/rock singer; childhood resident of Lemont
- Tyler Jay, pitcher, first-round pick of 2015 MLB draft
- Marius Katiliškis, prominent Lithuanian exile novelist
- Michael Katzban, state legislator in Wisconsin, born in Lemont
- David Molk, former center for the Philadelphia Eagles and San Diego Chargers
- Jerry Taft, weathercaster for ABC 7 news in Chicago
- Christian Vande Velde, cyclist, fourth place 2008 Tour de France finisher, born in Lemont
