= CN Joliet Subdivision =

Joliet Subdivision
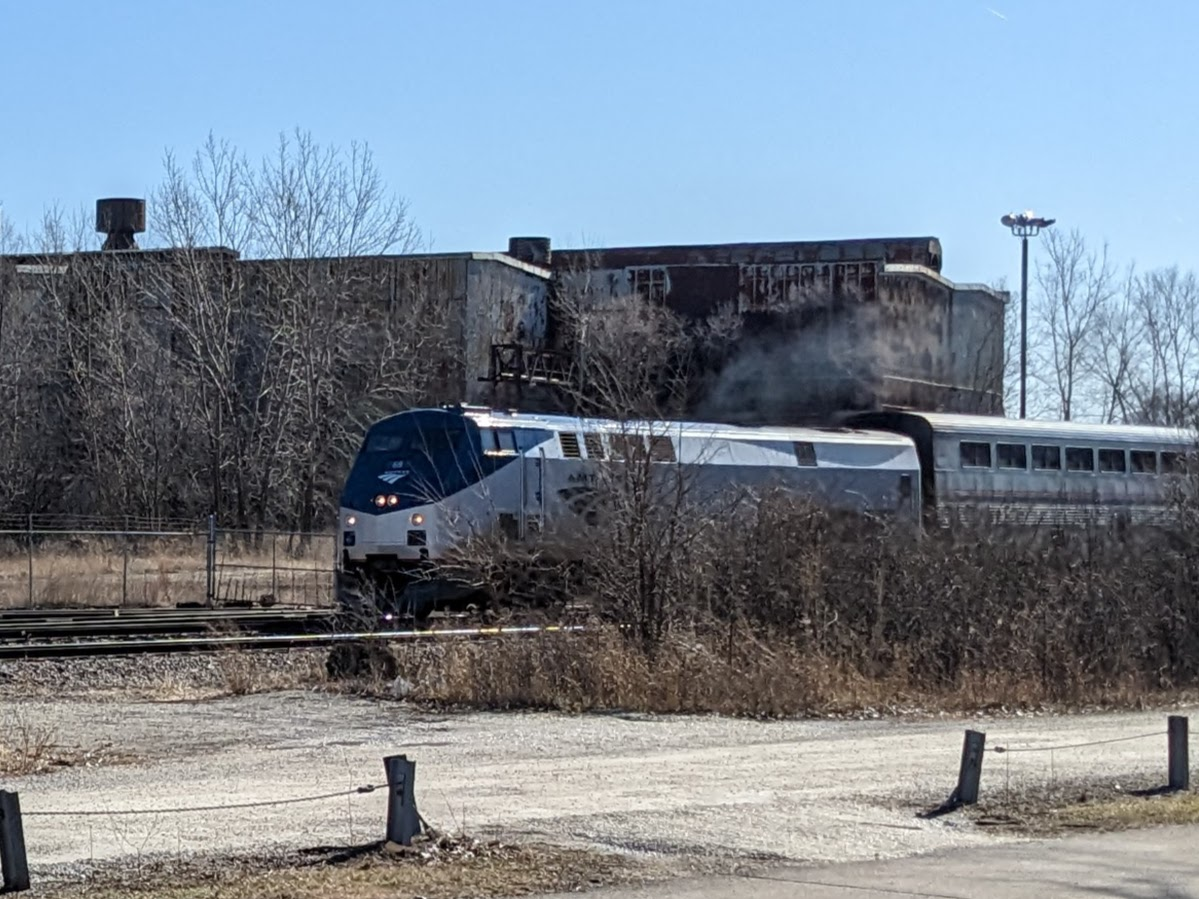
- Northbound Texas Eagle passing Joliet Iron and Steel Works

Overview
- Owner: Canadian National Railway
- Locale: Chicago metropolitan area
- Termini: Chicago; Joliet, Illinois

Service
- Type: Freight rail Commuter rail Inter-city rail
- Operator(s): Canadian National Railway; Metra; Amtrak

History
- Opened: 1858

Technical
- Line length: 33 mi (53 km)
- Number of tracks: 2
- Track gauge: 1,435 mm (4 ft 8 1/2 in) standard gauge

The Joliet Subdivision is a railroad subdivision of the Canadian National Railway in the Chicago metropolitan area. The 33-mile route runs from Joliet, Illinois to Chicago's Bridgeport neighborhood, largely paralleling the route of the Illinois and Michigan Canal. Union Pacific has trackage rights over the route, which meets the Union Pacific Joliet Subdivision at Joliet to reach Bloomington and St. Louis. The line also hosts Metra's Heritage Corridor commuter service, and Amtrak's Lincoln and Texas Eagle service (as far as Joliet). From Bridgeport, services reach Chicago Union Station via Canadian National's Freeport Subdivision.

== History ==
In 1856, the Illinois General Assembly issued a charter for the Joliet and Chicago Railroad, which was to run parallel to the existing Illinois and Michigan Canal connecting the two cities. Illinois governor Joel Matteson believed the success of the venture depended on it becoming the Chicago extension of the existing Chicago, Alton and St. Louis Railroad from Joliet, and hired that railroad to first survey, and then to build the new line. Construction began in June 1857, reaching Lockport in October. The first service on the completed line reached Chicago on March 18, 1858. The line was permanently leased to the Chicago, Alton and St. Louis in 1864.

In the 20th century, the subdivision progressively came under the control of larger railroads due to mergers. Between 1931 and 1942, the Chicago & Alton fell under the control of the Baltimore and Ohio Railroad. In 1947, the Alton, together with its Joliet Subdivision, was merged into the Gulf, Mobile and Ohio Railroad, which was in turn merged into the Illinois Central Gulf Railroad in 1972. In 1987, most of the former Alton Railroad route, from Joliet to St Louis, was purchased by the newly formed Chicago, Missouri and Western Railway, leaving only the Joliet Subdivision with the Illinois Central. In 1998, the subdivision passed under the control of the Canadian National Railway, together with the rest of the Illinois Central.

== Passenger Service ==
- Heritage Corridor of Metra
- Lincoln Service
- Texas Eagle
