= Alton Railroad =

Railroad in the midwestern United States

- Chicago and Alton Railroad system as of 1918, including the Toledo, St. Louis and Western Railroad (Clover Leaf) in orange, parent of the Alton until 1921

Overview
- Headquarters: Chicago, Illinois
- Reporting mark: A, C&A
- Locale: Chicago to St. Louis and Kansas City, Missouri
- Dates of operation: 1847 (Alton and Sangamon Railroad)–1947
- Successor: Gulf, Mobile and Ohio

Technical
- Track gauge: 4 ft 8 1/2 in (1,435 mm) standard gauge

The Alton Railroad (reporting mark A) was the final name of a railroad linking Chicago to Alton, Illinois; St. Louis, Missouri; and Kansas City, Missouri. Its predecessor, the Chicago and Alton Railroad (reporting mark C&A), was purchased by the Baltimore and Ohio Railroad in 1931 and was controlled until 1942 when the Alton was released to the courts. On May 31, 1947, the Alton Railroad was merged into the Gulf, Mobile and Ohio Railroad. Jacob Bunn had been one of the founding reorganizers of the Chicago & Alton Railroad Company during the 1860s.

Main lines included Chicago to St. Louis and a branch to Kansas City. The former is now part of Union Pacific, with Metra Heritage Corridor commuter rail service north of Joliet (owned by the Canadian National Railway but used by UP). Today, the Kansas City line is part of the CPKC system.

== History ==
The earliest ancestor to the Alton Railroad was the Alton and Sangamon Railroad, chartered February 27, 1847, in Illinois to connect the Mississippi River town of Alton to the state capital at Springfield in Sangamon County. The line was finished in 1852 with the first locomotive trip from Alton to Springfield on September 9, 1852. The Chicago and Mississippi Railroad extended to Bloomington in 1854 and Joliet in 1855. Initially trains ran over the completed Chicago and Rock Island Railroad to Chicago.

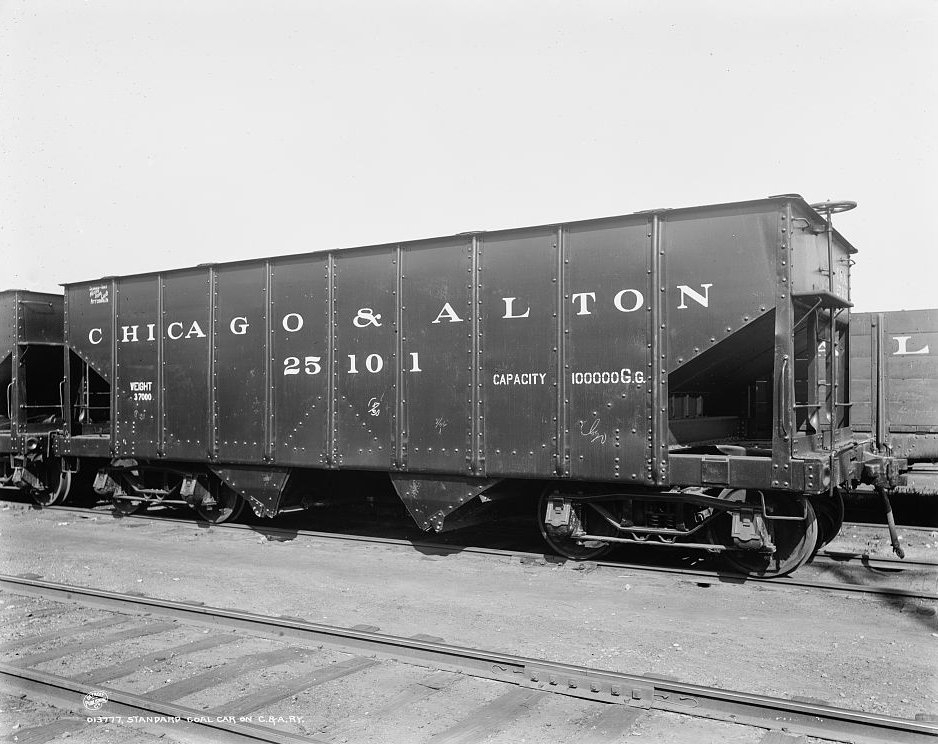
Chicago and Alton coal hopper.

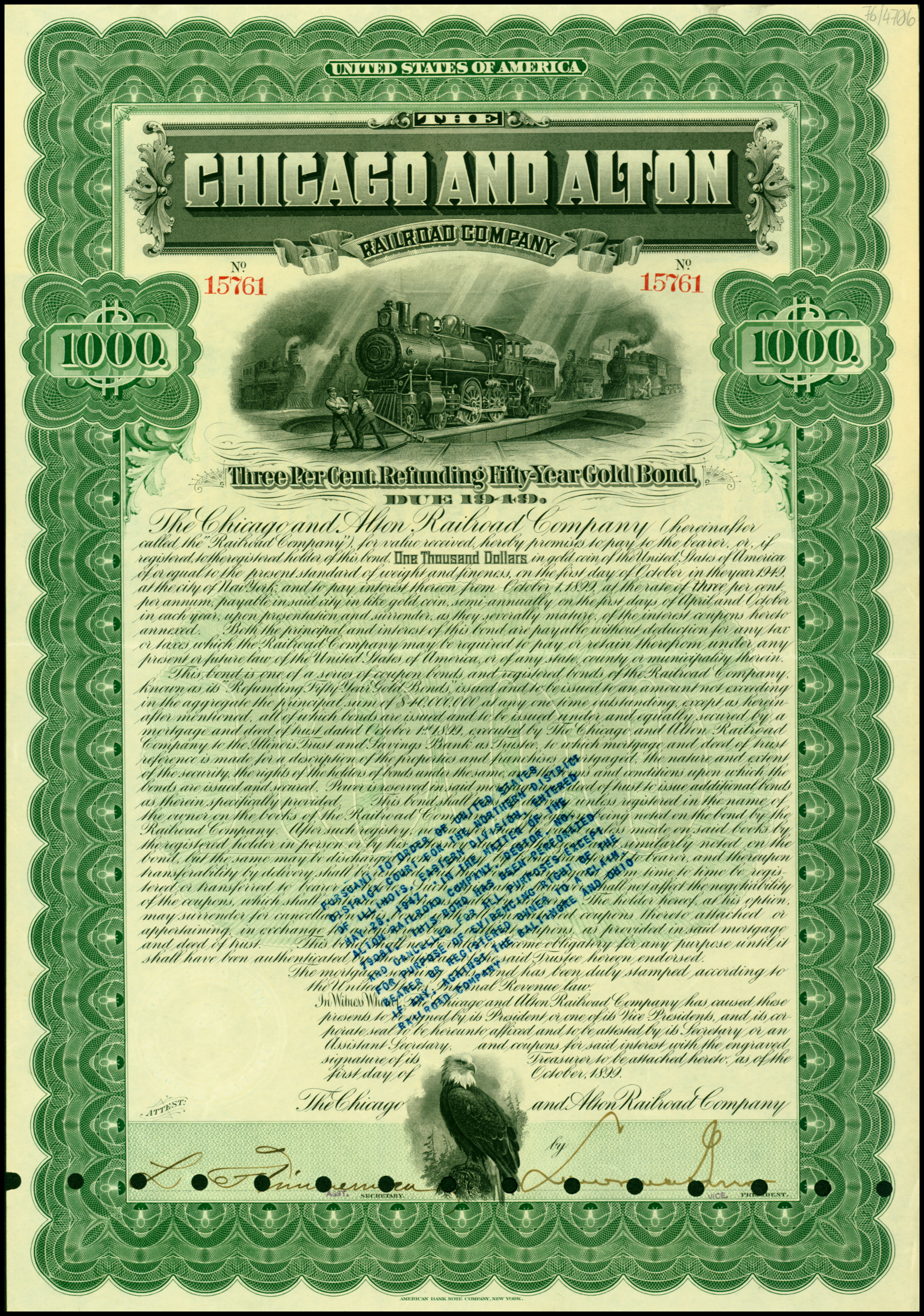
Gold Bond of the Chicago and Alton Railroad Company, issued 1. October 1899

The Joliet and Chicago Railroad was chartered February 15, 1855, and opened in 1856, continuing north and northeast from Joliet to downtown Chicago. It was leased by the Chicago and Mississippi, providing a continuous railroad from Alton to Chicago. In 1857 the C&M was reorganized as the St. Louis, Alton and Chicago Railroad, and another reorganization on October 10, 1862, produced the Chicago and Alton Railroad. The C&A chartered the Alton and St. Louis Railroad to extend the line to East St. Louis, opened in 1864, giving it a line from Chicago to East St. Louis.

The city of Bloomington, Illinois was the headquarters and primary repair site beginning in the 1850s. The repair shops for locomotives and rolling stock were located on the west side of the city between Seminary and Chestnut Streets. These were made of wood and burned in 1867. In 1883 the shops were substantially rebuilt on 40 acres of new land with 15 stone buildings. At that time the shops concentrated mainly on car repairs, but in 1905 they were expanded to accommodate major repairs and rebuilding of locomotives. At the peak of operations in the 1920s the shops employed 2,000 people.

In 1925 Chicago and Alton carried 2,143 million revenue ton-miles of freight and 202 million revenue passenger-miles on (at year-end) 1,056 miles of road and 1,863 miles of track. Same numbers for 1944 were 2596, 483, 959 and 1717. By 1950, all of the Alton's steam locomotives were replaced by diesel locomotives.

== Railroad family tree ==
=== Kansas City line ===
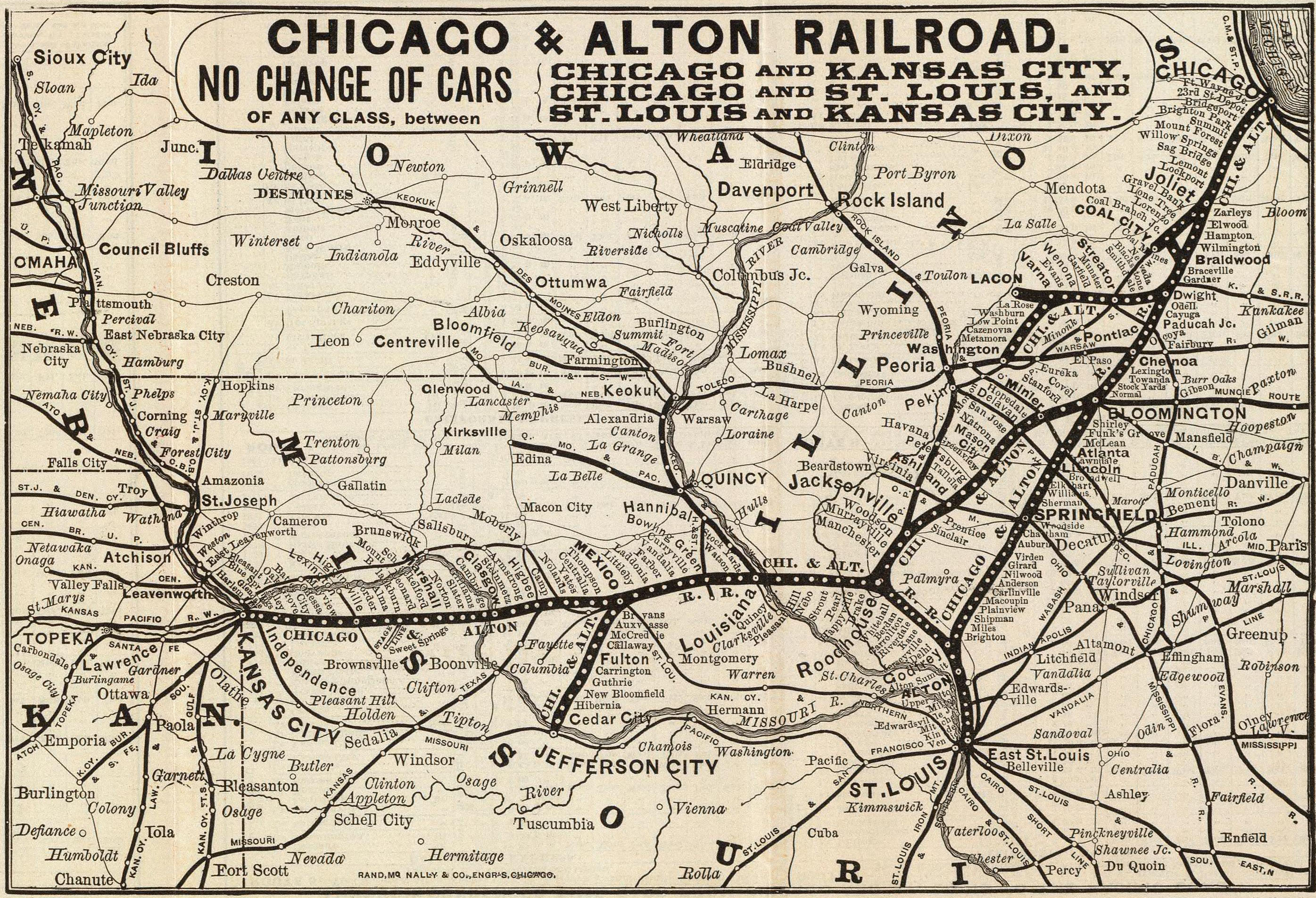
1885 map

Springfield-Kansas City and Godfrey-Roodhouse

- Gateway Western Railway
  - 1997–present Gateway Western is a Kansas City Southern Railway subsidiary
  - 1990-1997 Gateway Western was an affiliate of the Atchison, Topeka and Santa Fe Railway
    - Chicago, Missouri and Western Railway 1987-1989

=== Chicago-St. Louis line ===
- Union Pacific Railroad 1996–present Chicago-St. Louis line
  - SPCSL Corporation 1989-1996 a subsidiary of Southern Pacific Transportation Company
    - Chicago, Missouri and Western Railway 1987-1989

=== Early years of Alton ===
- Chicago, Missouri and Western Railway 1987-1989
  - Illinois Central Gulf Railroad 1972-1987
    - Gulf, Mobile and Ohio Railroad 1947-1972
      - Alton Railroad 1931-1947 Subsidiary of Baltimore and Ohio Railroad
        - Chicago and Alton Railroad 1906-1931 took over line from Peoria-Springfield
          - Chicago and Alton Railway 1900-1906 controlled by UP & Rock; later NKP
            - Chicago and Alton Railroad 1861-1900
              - Kansas City, St. Louis and Chicago Railroad 1878-1950 leased by Alton RR Mexico-Kansas City
              - Louisiana and Missouri River Railroad 1870-1950 leased by Alton RR Louisiana-Springfield, Missouri
              - Joliet and Chicago Railroad 1864-1950 leased by Alton RR Joliet – Chicago
              - St. Louis, Alton and Chicago Railroad c.1857-1861 Alton – Joliet
                - Alton and Sangamon Railroad 1847-c.1857 Springfield – Alton

== Passenger service notables ==
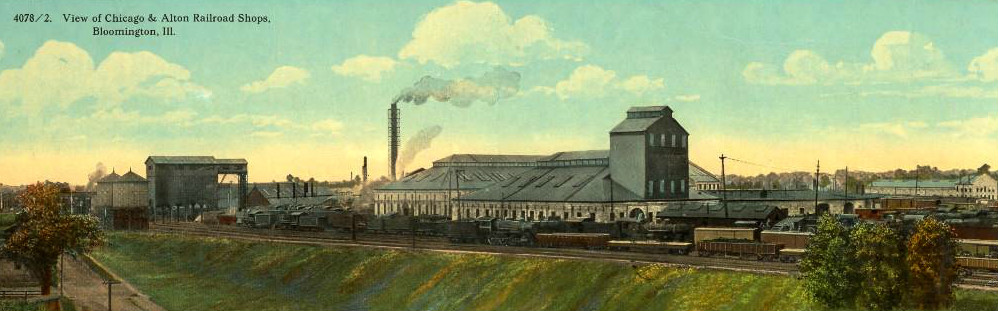
Postcard depiction of the railroad's Bloomington shops.

The first sleeping car designed by George Pullman was built in the C&A's Bloomington shops and introduced on September 1, 1859, on the Chicago-St. Louis route. Sleeping cars were operated over most routes between Chicago, Peoria, Bloomington, St. Louis and Kansas City in principal train consists. Successor Gulf, Mobile & Ohio operated Chicago-St. Louis sleeping car service until December 31, 1969, the last railroad to do so between the two cities.

The first dining car, the Delmonico, named for the famous New York restaurant, was built by Pullman in the Aurora, Illinois, shops of the Chicago, Burlington & Quincy. The car first appeared in regular service over the C&A's Chicago-St. Louis mainline. Two other Pullman diners built at the same time, the Tremont, and the Southern, were leased, providing dining car service on all three principal C&A Chicago-St. Louis trains. Dining cars were a part of Chicago-St. Louis train consists until May 1, 1971, with the takeover of passenger service by Amtrak.

In 1932 the Alton was the first Chicago-St. Louis Railroad to install air conditioning on its passenger trains.

=== Notable named passenger trains ===
- The Alton Limited
- Abraham Lincoln
- Ann Rutledge
- The Hummer
- The Midnight Special

=== Stations in Chicago ===
First entry of C&A passenger trains from Joliet into Chicago was over the Chicago & Rock Island to that railroad's depot (later La Salle Street Station). Briefly, passenger trains were moved over to the Illinois Central depot. On December 28, 1863, the leased J&C and Pittsburgh, Fort Wayne and Chicago Railway came to an agreement where the J&C would use the PFW&C's terminal at Madison Street, later becoming a tenant of Union Station, which opened in 1881. In 1924, with the completion of a new Union Station between Adams and Jackson streets, C&A became a tenant and its successors used Union Station until the takeover by Amtrak.

=== Stations elsewhere ===
Remaining stations built by the Chicago and Alton are located in Independence, Higginsville, and Marshall, Missouri.

== Company officers ==
Presidents of the Alton Railroad have included:

- Timothy Blackstone 1864–1899.
- Samuel Morse Felton, Jr. 1899–1908.
