= Mabel Shaw =

Mabel Shaw may refer to:

- Mabel A. Shaw, held the record of gambling on horse races at Hollywood Park race track in California
- Mabel Shaw (missionary), English missionary and educator
