= Daily Journal (Wheaton, Illinois) =

- Type: Daily newspaper
- Founder(s): George H. Smith and George M. Smith
- Founded: April 24, 1933
- Ceased publication: 1992
- Language: English
- City: Wheaton, Illinois
- Country: United States

The Daily Journal was a daily newspaper in Wheaton, Illinois that published for almost 60 years, from 1933 until 1992. In its final two decades, it was published by Copley Newspapers and had a final circulation of 7,650. Its origins were in a weekly newspaper founded in 1910 called the DuPage County Tribune.

== History ==
The Daily Journal’s forerunner, the DuPage County Tribune, began publishing in 1910 and was owned and published by John L. Brown.

In early 1913, two men, George H. Smith and George M. Smith, purchased the newspaper and renamed it the Wheaton Progressive. George H. Smith formerly had been the foreman of the paper, and after buying it became its publisher. Meanwhile, George M. Smith was named managing editor. In its earliest years, the paper’s offices were at 117 E. Front Street in Wheaton. By the 1930s — and well into the 1950s — the paper’s offices were at 110 E. Wesley Street in Wheaton.

On April 24, 1933, the Smiths launched a new, afternoon daily newspaper, the Daily Journal, which identified itself as the first daily newspaper to be published in DuPage County, Illinois. The banner at the top of the paper's front page stated: "Published by the Wheaton Progressive." The Wheaton Progressive kept publishing, but after several weeks, the Wheaton Progressive was discontinued and effectively merged into the Daily Journal. On June 6, 1933, the Daily Journal wrote that "Today's Journal comes to you as the first issue of the consolidation of the Daily Journal and the Wheaton Progressive. Postoffice (sic) requirements have been complied with for the merger and also the state law requiring the publication of notices has been adhered to in every way. So today The Wheaton Daily Journal comes to you as a regular legitimate newspaper."

Editor and publisher George M. Smith died in 1949 at age 64.

Dear Publication & Radio acquired the Daily Journal in March 1953 for $104,000.

In late 1953, the paper did not publish for five straight days after a strike of eight printers and pressmen.

In January 1971, Copley Newspapers began operating the Daily Journal. Under the arrangement, Copley assumed the management and publishing of the Journal under a lease arrangement, starting with the January 15, 1971 issue. Copley Newspapers eventually acquired the paper outright. Prior to Copley's takeover, Dear Publication had been producing the paper via a printed photo offset process. With the Copley takeover, the paper began being produced in a letterpress plant operated by Copley in Elgin, Illinois for Copley’s Elgin Courier-News daily.

By the early 1970s, the Daily Journal's offices were at 362 S. Schmale Road in Carol Stream, Illinois.

In 1991, Copley Newspapers acquired the Naperville Sun newspaper and its Sun Publications parent. In 1992, Copley decided to change the Daily Journal’s name to simply the Journal and shift its publishing schedule to twice a week as part of merging the Daily Journal into the operations of the Sun Publications. The paper’s final editor in chief was Pat Colander, and its final managing editor was William Currie.

In its final years, the communities that the Daily Journal covered were Wheaton, Glen Ellyn, Carol Stream, Glendale Heights, Winfield, West Chicago and Warrenville.

== Notable people ==
Among the reporters and editors who worked at the Daily Journal are:

- William Greider (late 1950s and early 1960s)
- Neil Steinberg (served as editorial page editor until late 1985)
- Hiawatha Bray (1980s)
- William Currie, who was part of a team at the Chicago Tribune that won a Pulitzer Prize in 1973
- Author Thom Wilder (early 1990s)
- Author Mike Sandrolini (1980s and 1990s)
- Josh Chetwynd (intern in early 1990s)
