= Tween 12 and 20 =

Advice column

'Tween 12 and 20 is a syndicated advice column, targeted to teenagers and young adults, written by Dr. Robert Wallace, and distributed by the Copley Press arm of Creators Syndicate.

== Background ==
The column began in 1976 and was originally published in the Orange County Register (California) several times a week. Today, the column is syndicated in more than 300 newspapers.

Common topics of "'Tween 12 and 20" columns include dating; relationships between teenagers, other teenagers, parents and teachers; health; and the transition from high school and college.

Wallace - a longtime school teacher, coach and administrator - lives in Galesburg, Illinois, and is a graduate of Knox College.
