= A. George Pradel =

American mayor (1937–2018)

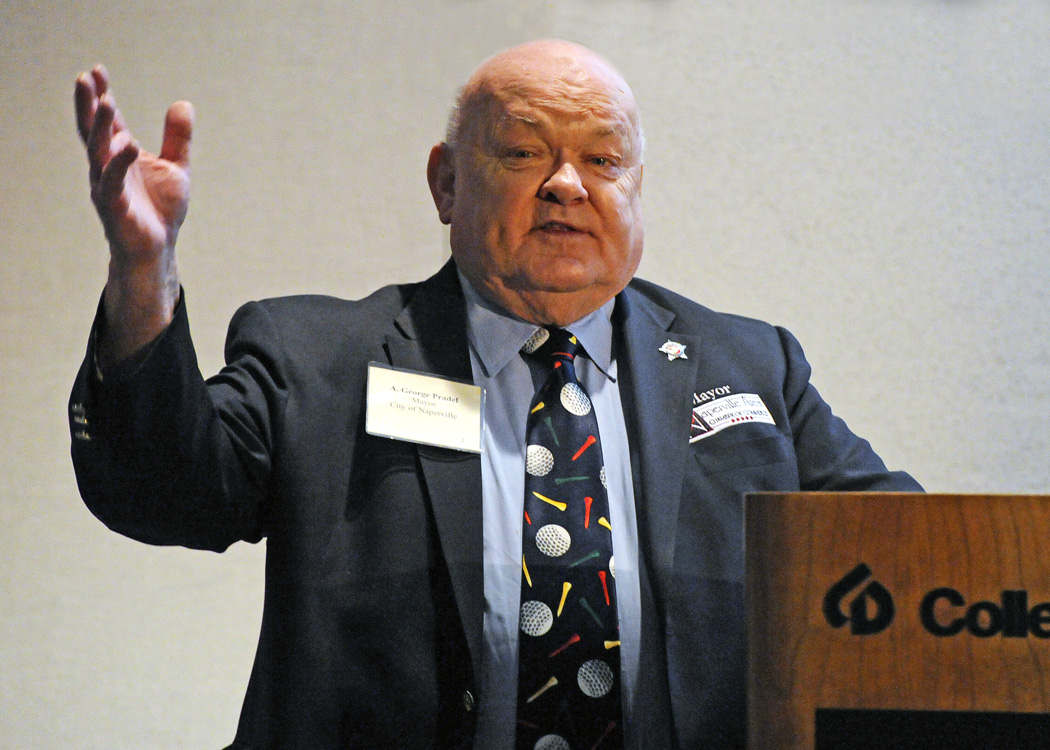
- Pradel in 2010

Mayor of Naperville, Illinois
- In office May 1995 – May 2015
- Preceded by: Samuel Macrane
- Succeeded by: Steve Chirico

Personal details
- Born: Arthur George Pradel; September 5, 1937 Chicago, Illinois, U.S.
- Died: September 4, 2018 (aged 80) Naperville, Illinois, U.S.
- Party: Independent
- Spouse: Patricia Pradel
- Children: 3
- Profession: Police officer, Politician

Military service
- Branch/service: U.S. Marine Corps

Arthur George Pradel (September 5, 1937 – September 4, 2018) was an American police officer and politician who was elected mayor of Naperville, Illinois in 1995 and re-elected in 1999, 2003, 2007, and 2011 making him the longest-serving mayor of Naperville. In 2015, Pradel did not run for reelection, but declined to personally endorse a candidate. The election was won by Steve Chirico, a former city council member, who was sworn in on May 3, 2015.

== Biography ==
Pradel grew up in Naperville, Illinois as the oldest of six children. After graduating from what is now Naperville Central High School, he served for three years in the U.S. Marine Corps. In 1966 he joined the Naperville Police Department, where he spent much of his career visiting schools and speaking to children, earning him the nickname "Officer Friendly," a moniker that stuck for 28 years and became an asset in his future election as mayor. In 1977, Naperville started Safety Town, and Mayor Rybicki named Pradel to be its first teacher. In 2015, the Naperville Junior Women’s Club and Safety Town Commission renamed the officially changed the name of the site to the A. George and Patricia Pradel Safety Town of Naperville.

In 1992, Pradel underwent quadruple-bypass heart surgery. In 2006, he was hospitalized when doctors put in a stent after tests showed a blockage in one of his arteries. In February 2010, he was again hospitalized, and an angioplasty was performed to insert two additional stents.

In 2013, Pradel was awarded an honorary degree from North Central College for his tireless devotion to Naperville and the college.

In May 2015, Pradel retired from Mayor, but still made public appearances -- even leading the 2015 Memorial Day Parade.

== Elections ==
=== 1995 ===
Pradel entered the 1995 race for mayor of Naperville with no political background or history as an elected official. He faced three opponents in a February primary election that would narrow the field to only two candidates. The other candidates in the primary were Archer Stella, Jack Tenison and Doug Krause. Krause, an active city councilman, had run for mayor previously in 1991 and lost to Samuel Macrane. Pradel won the most votes in the primary, but Tenison was behind by only four votes and was in second place, earning him a spot on the general election ballot. Tenison was a two-term city council member who also headed the human resources department for DuPage County.

A geographical break-down of votes revealed that while Tenison did well in Naperville's south side in Will County, where he took 47 percent of the vote to Pradel's 21 percent, Pradel was strongest in Naperville's township, which included the established downtown area. Pradel said he did well in the downtown area because the older and more established area held many residents who knew him from his years as "Officer Friendly" with the Naperville Police Department. He vowed to focus campaigning for the general election on Naperville's south side to get a better foothold in the area.

Debate in the general election focused mainly on the role of the mayor in Naperville, where a city manager form of government is employed and mayoral duties are defined as part-time. The last three mayors of Naperville were retirees and had treated the job as full-time, a tradition that Pradel said he would continue if elected. Tenison said he would continue his job with the human resources department in DuPage County, and that he would hold evening office-hours if elected.

The race was expected to be close, with former candidates Krause and Stella endorsing Pradel and Tenison receiving the endorsement of local newspaper The Daily Herald. Tenison was also a bigger election spender, having spent $8,851 after one reporting period while Pradel had spent $6,278.

Pradel won the April general election with unofficial results showing Pradel with 9,300 votes and Tenison with 6,469, a wide margin that surprised political pundits, most of whom had declined to predict a winner and said the race was too close to call.

=== 1999 ===
Although Pradel's 2007 reelection website stated that Pradel "won overwhelmingly in his first election and was unchallenged in his next two mayoral elections," Pradel actually faced retired accountant Ric Romano in his second mayoral election in 1999, although the race was not close. Romano hoped to take advantage of a controversial commercial development in an area known as Spring Green on the corner of Naper Boulevard and Hobson Road. Pradel supported the 6.3-acre (25,000 m^{2}) development that would include a beauty salon, dental office, and 10 single-family homes as a good compromise, despite criticism from local newspapers The Daily Herald and The Naperville Sun, as well as opposition from residents who petitioned against the development.

Still, Pradel received the endorsements of both the Herald and the Sun and easily won the election with 10,293 votes to Romano's 1,952 votes, a feat attributed by the Herald to Pradel's high public visibility and growing popularity.

=== 2003 (unopposed) ===
With a lack of divisive issues and Mayor Pradel's popularity soaring, there were no other candidates in the race for mayor in 2003. Mayor Pradel was elected unanimously by the people.

=== 2007 ===
Pradel was joined by two experienced city council members on the primary ballot in 2007. The other candidates were Doug Krause, who had also participated in the 1991 and 1995 races, and 12-year city councilwoman Mary Ellingson. Because voters could only vote for one candidate in the primary, Pradel was worried that a majority of people would consider him a shoo-in and cast a vote for their choice among the other two candidates, consequently leading to his elimination in the primary. The typically low voter turnout in primary elections added to this concern. So even though Pradel still enjoyed overwhelming popularity in the city, he campaigned vigorously and sent letters to constituents reminding them to vote.

Despite Pradel's worries, he received 70.1 percent of the primary vote, or 7,884 votes in an unofficial total, compared to Ellingson's 1,596 votes and Krause's 1,766. Because Krause received more votes than Ellingson, he was able to join Pradel on the general election ballot in April. Once out of the race, Ellingson publicly gave her support to Krause, saying that she believed the people of Naperville wanted to see a new face.

In the general election, Krause told reporters he would not accept donations from developers or companies that do business with the city. Pradel said he didn't hold those views, telling The Naperville Sun that he was "thrilled" that any individual or group would donate to a campaign. The Sun reported Pradel's total funds at over $27,000 and Krause at about $7,200 at one point during the weeks leading up to the election.

Pradel ultimately won reelection with 12,904 total votes or 69 percent compared to Krause's 5,688 votes, according to unofficial results.

== Death ==
Pradel was admitted to Edward Hospital in Naperville in the summer of 2018 for back pain. While there, doctors found a malignant tumor that spread across his body. He entered hospice care on September 2, 2018, and died one day shy of his 81st birthday.

== See also ==
- List of mayors of Naperville, Illinois
