= David C. Copley =

Newspaper publisher (1952–2012)

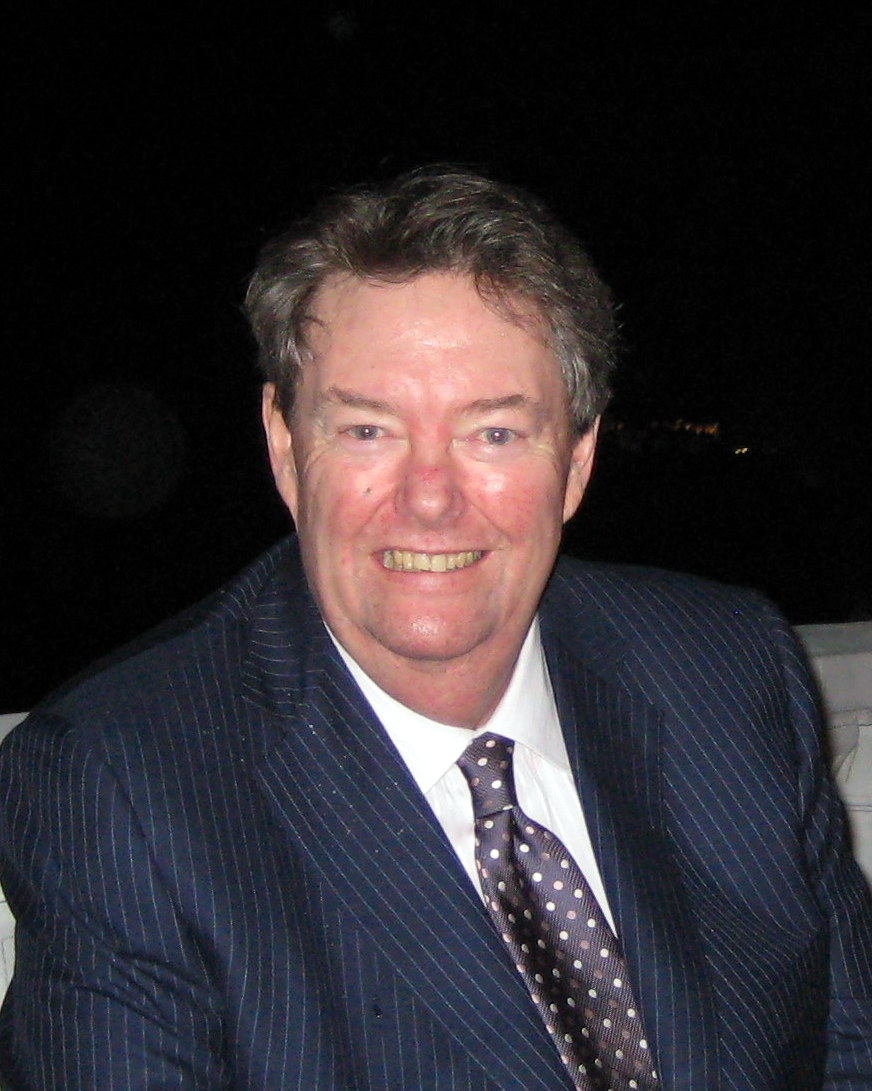
- Born: David Casey Hunt; January 31, 1952; San Diego, California, US
- Died: November 20, 2012 (aged 60); La Jolla, California, US
- Education: BA (Business Administration), Menlo College, 1975
- Employer: Copley Press
- Known for: newspaper publisher, philanthropist
- Title: President of Copley Press
- Term: 1988–2012
- Predecessor: Helen K. Copley
- Parents: Helen K. Copley; James S. Copley (adoptive)

David C. Copley (January 31, 1952 – November 20, 2012) was an American publishing heir, on the board of the Copley Press for over thirty years, becoming president and owner, as well as publisher of the San Diego Union-Tribune. He was a noted philanthropist.

== Early life ==
Copley was born as David Hunt in San Diego in 1952, the son of Helen K. Copley. He went to boarding school at Canterbury School, graduating in 1970. In 1988, the school dedicated David Casey Copley Library is his honor. He went on to attain a BA in Business Administration from Menlo College in 1975.

His mother worked for James Copley, the owner of Copley Press, as secretary, marrying him in 1965. On her husband's death she became owner of the Copley Press chain of some 20 newspapers and a wire service, the Copley News Service. David Copley was adopted by James Copley two months after the wedding.

== Ownership of Copley Press ==
Copley joined the board of directors of Copley Press in 1975, becoming senior vice president and assistant to the president in 1984. In 1988, he became president of Copley Press and in 1997 he became publisher of the San Diego Union-Tribune. During his tenure as publisher, the U-T won two Pulitzer Prizes: one was in 2006 for its role in uncovering the Duke Cunningham bribery scandal; the other was in 2009 for the work of editorial cartoonist Steve Breen. In 2007/2008, the paper also won the California Newspaper Publishers Association's Best in the State award. In May 2009 the San Diego Union-Tribune was sold to a Beverly Hills investment firm.

== Philanthropy ==
Until his death a resident of the San Diego neighborhood of La Jolla, California, Copley had been named in Forbes Magazine's 2005 list of the 400 richest Americans and according to Forbes magazine was a billionaire.

After his heart transplant there in June 2005, Copley donated a reported $5 million to Sharp Healthcare, operator of Sharp Memorial Hospital., allowing the founding of the David C. Copley Cardiac and Pulmonary Rehabilitation Center.

Copley was a noted sponsor of the arts, both personally and through the James S. Copley Foundation, including the Old Globe Theatre and Museum of Photographic Arts in Balboa Park, San Diego, and the La Jolla Playhouse. He supported the Museum of Contemporary Art both financially and on the board, leading to the establishment of The David C. Copley Chair and the David C. Copley Building, and from 2011 until his death he served as President of the Board of Trustees of the museum. He established The David C. Copley Center for the Study of Costume Design at UCLA with a $6 million grant in 2008. He also gave to animal shelters in San Diego and Escondido, as well as the San Diego Crew Classic and the new downtown library.

== Interests ==
Copley was an avid collector of contemporary art, which included a world class collection by Christo, as well as pieces by Andy Warhol, John Baldessari, and David Hockney. He also enjoyed the theatre and was a Tony-winning producer of the 2008 Broadway musical Memphis, directed by the La Jolla Playhouse artistic director Christopher Ashley.

Copley was a motoring enthusiast, and collector of classic cars. His collection included an Aston Martin, a Porsche, a Cadillac, and a Maybach. Between 1986 and 2002, he was arrested three times for drunk driving. After his arrest in 1989, he pleaded guilty and was sentenced to two days in jail, a $939 fine, and five years' probation.

He was also a keen sailor, and owned a Hobie catamaran and the 50m Delta Marine motor-yacht Happy Days.

== Death ==
Copley died on November 20, 2012, from an apparent heart attack, while driving his Aston Martin, about a mile from home in the La Jolla neighborhood of San Diego. Police and fire crews on the scene attempted CPR, and Copley was taken to nearby Scripps Memorial Hospital. Resuscitation attempts were unsuccessful, likely due to underlying cardiac issues. He had been the recipient of a heart transplant in June 2005.
