= Venice Vanguard =

Newspaper in Venice, California

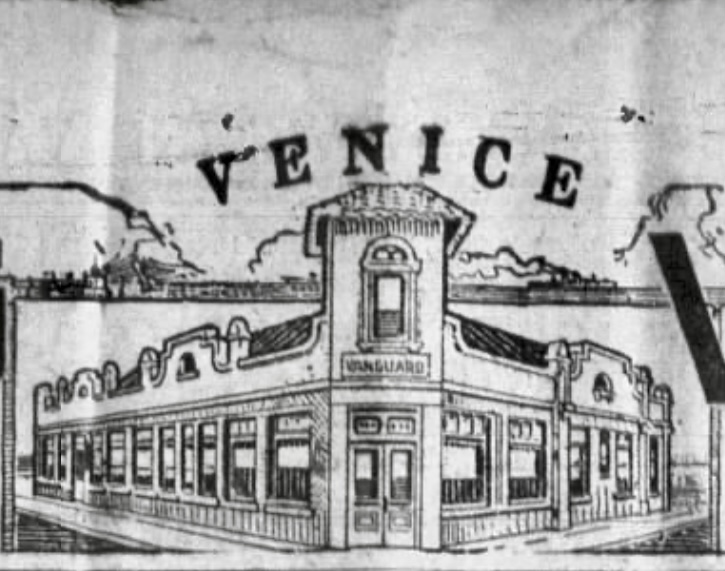
- Illustration of Venice Vanguard offices from 1920 newspaper masthead
- Founder(s): William A. Rennie; C.B. Irvine
- Founded: 1907
- Ceased publication: 1977

The Venice Vanguard was a newspaper circulated in Venice, California, from 1907 until 1977.

== History ==
On June 17, 1907, C.B. Irvine and Judge William A. Rennie published the first edition of the Venice Vanguard. Irvine was soon bought out. In January 1910, Rennie was appointed justice of the peace of Ballona Township. He also served as a city recorder for Venice. Around that time his sons, Robert H. Rennie and Walter W. Rennie, joined the firm.

Rennie was secretary of the good Government League in Venice but resigned to run for office. In 1912, Rennie ran for state assembly as a Progressive but dropped out of the race. Rennie served five terms as vice president of the Southern California Editorial Association. In 1919, Rennie died of Spanish influenza.

In 1920, George W. Tompkins acquired the paper from the Rennie family. In 1922, F.W. Kellogg and Edward A. Dickson acquired the business. In 1928, Kellogg sold his newspaper chain to Ira C. Copley, owner of Copley Press. The Vanguard was a daily until 1941 due to newsprint shortages caused by World War II.

In 1947, Ira C. Copley died. In 1949, the paper resumed daily publication. In 1969, James S. Copley announced the sale of the Vanguard, Culver City Star-News and Westchester Star-News to Edwin W. Dean Jr., publisher of the Inglewood Daily News. In November 1976, a former Culver City mayor filed a $3 million libel suit against Dean Jr. and a former city councilmember. In January 1977, R.D. Funk, owner of United Western Newspapers, acquired the Vanguard and merged it into the Venice-Marina News.

== Legal problems ==
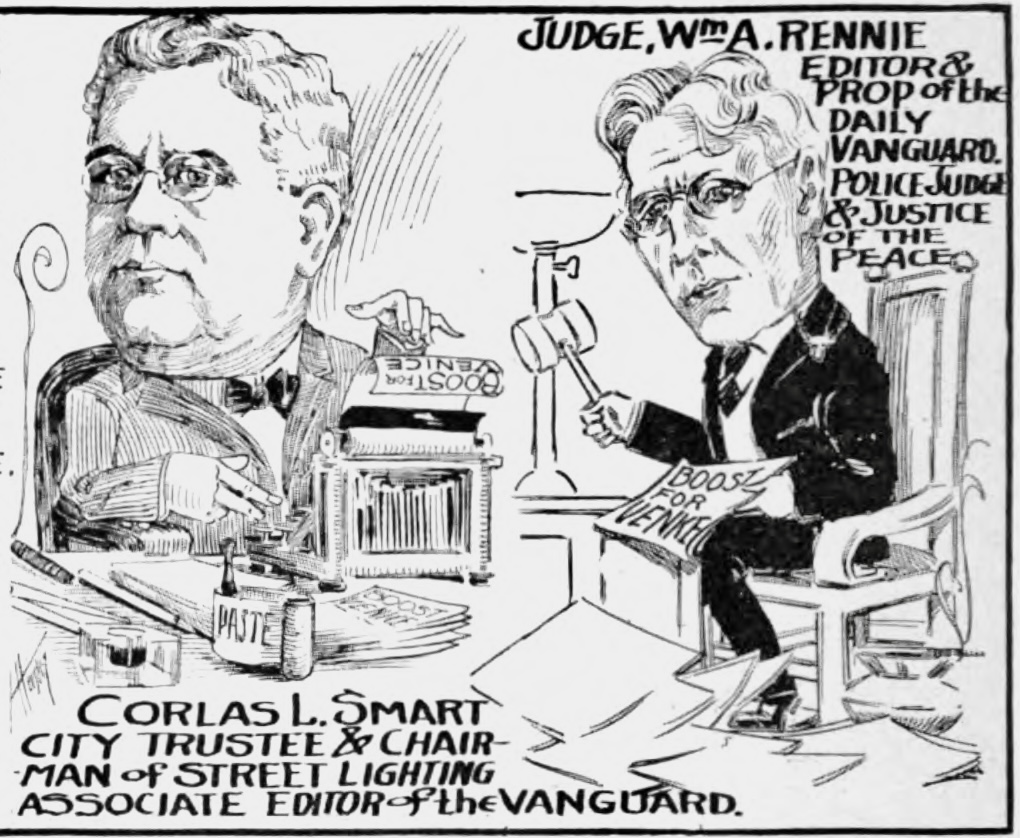
Corlas L. Smart & William A. Rennie of the Venice Vanguard (Out West, 1914)

In 1907, newspaper published an article, later termed an "allegory," a take-off of Charles Dickens' A Tale of Two Cities, and meant to be amusing, which mentioned Abbot Kinney, the founder of Venice, and W.H. Anderson. A court held the reference to be libelous but levied only a small sum, $750, as recompense, to be paid by Kinney to Anderson.

Alva A. Layne, owner of the Ocean Park Journal, sought $5,000 in damages. More than a hundred thousand dollars had been sought in the five suits filed. The trial was a lengthy one, but the jury deliberated for only sixteen minutes.

In October 1910, Vanguard owner W.A. Rennie sued Raymond Wayman of the Wilmington Journal, alleging libel and asking $50,000 in damages. He claimed that the Journal, in an article headlined "The Squealing of a Rat," had called him a "cheap little squirt" who "stole editorials," a "lovely ass," and a "long-tailed sewer rat." He said the article painted him as "out of sympathy" with the families of the victims of the Los Angeles Times bombing.
