= The Independent (Massillon) =

American daily newspaper

- Type: Daily newspaper
- Format: Broadsheet
- Owner: USA Today Co.
- Publisher: Cindy Conrad
- Editor: Joe Shaheen
- Founded: July 3, 1863, as Massillon Independent
- Headquarters: 50 North Avenue, Northwest, Massillon, Ohio 44648, United States
- Circulation: 4,734 (as of 2018)
- Sister newspapers: The Repository; The Suburbanite; The Times-Reporter
- OCLC number: 11129683
- Website: IndeOnline.com

The Independent (formerly The Evening Independent) is an American daily newspaper published weekdays and Saturdays in Massillon, Ohio. It is owned by USA Today Co.

The newspaper covers western Stark County, Ohio, including Massillon, Beach City, Brewster, Canal Fulton, Jackson, Lawrence Township, Navarre, Perry and Tuscarawas Township.

GateHouse acquired the paper from Copley Newspapers in April 2007.

The Independent is related to three other Northeast Ohio newspapers, the dailies The Repository of Canton and The Times-Reporter of New Philadelphia, and the weekly The Suburbanite in southern Summit County.
