= Inglewood Daily News =

Daily newspaper published in Inglewood, California

- Type: Daily newspaper
- Founder: Harold M. Beal
- Founded: Circa 1906 (as the Inglewood Times)
- Ceased publication: 1994
- Language: English
- City: Inglewood, California

The Inglewood Daily News was published in Inglewood, California, beginning around 1906 and ending in 1994.

== History ==
Around 1906, the weekly Inglewood Times newspaper was established. It was published by Harold M. Beal. In April 1908, Hugh W. Hunt began publication of the Inglewood Poultryman in the community, which had a population of about a thousand and included forty families who owned poultry ranches there. The area was served by the Los Angeles Railway. Hunt previously worked at the Times. The name was soon changed from the Poultryman to the News.

In early 1909, Beal moved to Descanso, California due to his poor health. After seven months, he began to improve and announced plans to sell the paper and buy a local ranch. However, in December 1909, Beal died of tuberculosis. In January 1910, Hunt acquired the Times and absorbed it into the News. In April 1911, John M. Reed bought the News, but that December sold it back to Hunt due to declining health.

In November 1912, Hunt sold the Times again, this time to Sam M. Greene. In July 1915, William D. Crow and Thad N. Shaw, former publishers of the The Vidette of Montesano, Washington, bought the News from Greene. In 1923, they converted it into a daily newspaper called the Inglewood Daily News. In 1925, the paper, under Crow and Shaw, purchased a Cox-o-Type printing press, which was installed under the supervision of Joseph Cox, the designer.

Around 1926, Crow sold his interest to T.D. Shaw and his son, Hubert H. Shaw. In 1930, the paper dedicated a new $25,000 Hoe press capable of printing 25,000 sixteen-page newspapers in an hour. An open house at the plant attracted a thousand people. Shaw soon retired due to poor health and died of heart disease in November 1930. His son and widow, Mabel A. Shaw, then managed the Daily News. In March 1936, former co-owner Crow died. In August 1937, the paper's office was transformed into a modern style environment with a "face-lifting operation."

On April 1, 1946, Edwin W. Dean, former Marengo, Illinois, editor and publisher, and Kenneth H. Kraft of Highland Park, Illinois, acquired the business from the Shaws. Dean took over active management of the business on June 17 after he and his family moved into their new home in Morningside Park.

In 1947, the International Typographical Union made an attempt to organize the mechanical workers of the Daily News. Pickets were at the building to demand a closed-shop contract. A strike was called, and about half of all employees refused to cross the picket line. Dean offered a contract hinging on the results of a National Labor Relations Board vote, but he was turned down. The newspaper already had a closed-shop contract with its stereotypers and pressmen.

Dean died in November 1963, and Kraft sold his interest around that time. Dean's son Edwin W. Dean Jr. took over as publisher and in 1969 acquired the Culver City Evening Star-News, Venice Vanguard and Westchester Star-News from Copley Press. On May 13, 1973, the newspaper's building at 121 North LaBrea Avenue was almost leveled by fire, resulting in $100,000 in damages. A fireman was injured.

In 1979, Dean Jr. and his mother Ruth D. Dean sold their eight community newspapers and another semi-monthly trade publication to Coast Media Inc., owned by Richard Bronner and Bob Payson of West Los Angeles. Later that year the company bought four other local papers operated as Hawthorne Community News Inc.

Stephen Hadland became an owner at some point. The group sold off four papers in 1985. At that time the total circulation of the group was 70,000. In 1994, Coast Media Newspapers was seized by the Internal Revenue Service for failure to pay $228,000 in back taxes. The entire staff of nearly 50 was laid off. Hadland attempted to reopen the business was the tax lien was settled. At that time the Daily News for a freesheet. He was unsuccessful, and the paper ceased.
