= Neil Steinberg =

American writer

- Born: June 10, 1960 (age 66)
- Occupations: American news columnist for the Chicago Sun-Times, author
- Years active: 1987-present

Neil Steinberg (born June 10, 1960) is an American news columnist for the Chicago Sun-Times and an author. He joined the paper's staff in 1987.

Steinberg has written for a wide variety of publications, including Esquire, The Washington Post, The New York Times Sunday Magazine, Rolling Stone, Sports Illustrated, Details, Men's Journal, National Lampoon and Spy. He has also written for web sites, including Salon and Forbes.com.

== Early life and education ==
Steinberg was born to a Jewish family in Ohio and raised in Berea, Ohio. He moved to Chicago to attend Northwestern University from where he graduated in 1982 with a journalism degree.

== Career ==
Steinberg began his career working in Los Angeles in public relations. He returned to the Chicago area, where he freelanced and began his journalism career in Chicago's suburbs, working for the Barrington Courier-Review. He later wrote for the now-defunct Wheaton Daily Journal newspaper, but was fired after writing a column that made fun of the paper's publisher.

Steinberg joined the Chicago Sun-Times in 1987. In 1996, after an extended paternity leave, he began writing three columns a week for the paper and serving on the paper's editorial board.

For two years starting in 1995, Steinberg wrote the "Bobwatch" column in the Chicago Reader alternative weekly newspaper, skewering the columns written by the Chicago Tribune's Bob Greene. He authored the column using the nom de plume Ed Gold, a name he also used for the Reader's "True Books" column. After Greene was fired by the Tribune in 2002 for engaging in an inappropriate relationship with a high school girl who had come to his office to interview him for her school newspaper, Steinberg wrote an article for Salon.com in September 2002 that mocked Greene and concluded with the line "Who will we make fun of now?"

In 2005, Steinberg began writing columns on the side for the New York Daily News.

After his arrest for domestic abuse in 2005, Steinberg was dropped from the Sun-Times' editorial board but added a fourth column per week.

In 2013 Steinberg was inducted into the Chicago Gay and Lesbian Hall of Fame as a Friend of the Community.

In June 2013, Steinberg's column in the Sun-Times was cut from four days a week to one. Crain's Chicago Business reported that the move came after a controversial column by Steinberg that then-Sun-Times Editor Jim Kirk had criticized for reading like an ad for a car time-share company. Steinberg remained with the Sun-Times writing feature articles, although he lamented to Crain's that writing just one column per week is "like trying to breathe through a straw." The column now runs Monday, Wednesday and Friday.

On June 7, 2022, Steinberg wrote a controversial piece advocating for gun restrictions that went viral. His reasoning was that the amendments of the Bill of Rights are not absolute, pointing to the ban on child pornography. He argued that interpretation of the other rights as absolute would harm children. "...by their reasoning, child pornography should be legal, out of respect for the First Amendment, with the harm it causes children shrugged off." In response, Steinberg was criticized by some gun advocates, who sent him antisemitic and violent threats.

== Obituary writing ==
At the Sun-Times, Steinberg has specialized in writing obituaries of important figures. He is a member of the Society of Professional Obituary Writers.

In 2018, an advance obituary written by Steinberg about Chicago Teachers Union President Karen Lewis briefly was erroneously published online due to a production glitch. Lewis subsequently told the Chicago Tribune that "I am not dead" and that "I thought it was hilarious -- stuff happens." Lewis added that she was touched by Steinberg's first line: "Karen Lewis was fearless." She told the Tribune that "I think it's a mitzvah. But I'm not sure it's true."

In 2014, Steinberg, in response to a query from a reader, wrote his own advance obituary on his blog.

In 2001, Steinberg reflected to the Chicago Reader on the art of writing obituaries of flawed individuals: "I did one of the Greylord judges' obits. I was talking about what he went to jail for, and I used a phrase like 'He took cash bribes to let drunk drivers go free.' And the copy desk changed it to quote judicial corruption unquote. And then after it ran, his sister called to complain that we had treated him shabbily by focusing on this Greylord business. I went in to Nigel Wade [the editor then] and I said, 'Look what you do. By editing the story for the family you cheat the million other readers of a strong description of his crime--and the family's still pissed off. You please nobody.' I would rather cheese off the few members of the family who are unredeemably biased than write some sort of pabulum they can put in their scrapbooks and is a trivialization of the truth." (Steinberg almost surely was referring to his January 1997 obituary of a high-ranking Cook County judge in Operation Greylord, Richard F. LeFevour. That obituary's lead sentence references "judicial corruption": "Richard F. LeFevour, who was convicted in the infamous Operation Greylord probe of judicial corruption in Chicago and never expressed remorse, died Saturday.")

== Blogging ==
In July 2013, Steinberg created his own blog to highlight his writing apart from the Sun-Times, called everygoddamnday.com.

== Personal life ==
Steinberg is married to Edie (née Goldberg) Steinberg, has two sons and lives in Northbrook, Illinois.

In 2005, Steinberg was charged with domestic battery for slapping his wife as she tried to call 9-1-1 to report abuse. Steinberg told the Chicago Tribune that he would be entering alcohol counseling "Everyone focuses on the slap--and that was the only time I ever hit my wife," Steinberg told Chicago magazine in 2008. "But the big issue was really the drinking. I had been drinking." In November 2005, a judge dismissed the domestic abuse charge after prosecutors told the judge that Steinberg had complied with a court order to enter an alcohol treatment program. Steinberg subsequently wrote about the arrest in the Sun-Times, writing that while drunk at his home in September, he had slapped his wife: "She called the cops, they came, clapped me into handcuffs and hauled me off to jail. When I asked her later why she had to have me arrested, she said, 'Nobody hits me, buddy.'" Steinberg added that "I certainly don't plan to get myself in jail again. I will do everything I can not to betray the support of the paper."

In 2010, Steinberg's domestic abuse arrest became part of Chicago's mayoral race when one of the candidates, former U.S. Senator Carol Moseley Braun, responded at a press conference to a harshly critical column that Steinberg had written about her by calling Steinberg "a drunk and a wife beater" and saying: "It's the truth. The Sun-Times ought to do better by Chicagoans than to give this man a platform...for his divisive rantings." Steinberg responded by noting that "The difference between my past and hers is that I have done the hard work to change myself, while she remains exactly what she was, alas. If a person cannot tolerate one teasing column, how can she hope to be mayor of a great city?"

== Bibliography ==
=== Books ===
- If at All Possible, Involve a Cow: The Book of College Pranks (1992)
- Complete and Utter Failure: A Celebration of Also-Rans, Runners-Up, Never-Weres and Total Flops (1994)
- The Alphabet of Modern Annoyances (1996)
- Don't Give Up the Ship: Finding My Father While Lost at Sea (2002)
- Hatless Jack (2004)
- Drunkard (2008)
- You Were Never in Chicago (2012)
- Out of the Wreck I Rise: A Literary Companion to Recovery (2016) written with Sara Bader

=== Essays and reporting ===
- Steinberg, Neil (Autumn 2009). "Driving with Ed McElroy". Granta (108): 19–37.
