= Tommy Edison =

American content creator, radio presenter, and film critic (born 1963)

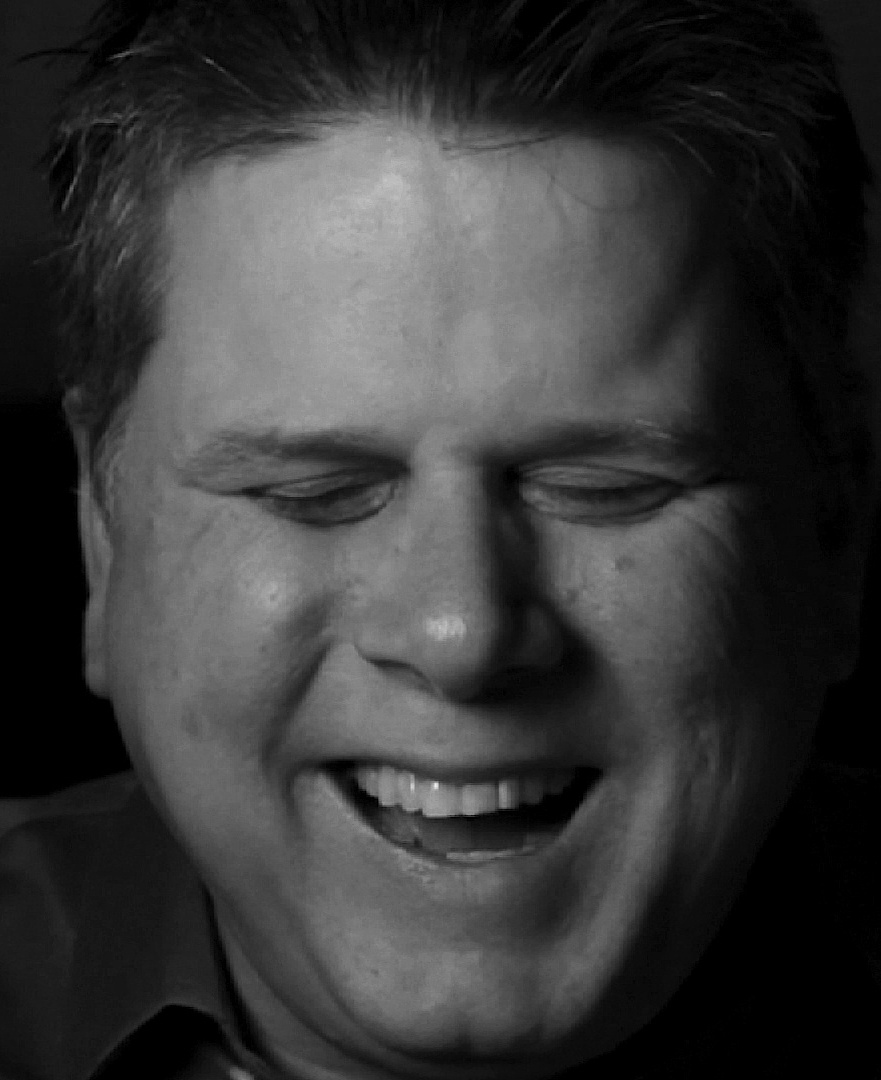
- Edison in 2012
- Born: July 17, 1963 (age 63); Greenwich, Connecticut, U.S.
- Other name: Blind Film Critic
- Education: University of Bridgeport
- Occupations: Content creator; radio presenter; Film critic

YouTube information
- Channel: TommyEdisonXP
- Years active: 2011–present
- Genres: Comedy; Review; Life stories
- Subscribers: 726 thousand
- Views: 157 million
- Last updated: April 21, 2026
- Website: tommyedison.com

Tommy Edison (born July 17, 1963) is an American content creator, radio presenter and film critic known for his blindness and self-deprecating sense of humor in his internet presence. From 1994 until 2013, he worked as a traffic reporter for the station Star 99.9 in Bridgeport, Connecticut.

Although he had never driven a car or seen a traffic jam, as a traffic reporter he used what he heard about traffic on police scanners and in calls with listeners on the road.

Motivated to review films by his frustration with their visual language, he started a YouTube channel called Blind Film Critic with his friend Ben Churchill in 2011. His reviews focus on script, music and sound effects. The first film he reviewed was Scream 4; his favorites include Hugo, Goodfellas, Clerks and American Hustle. In 2013, audio description allowed him to watch his first silent film, which he joked was "eye-opening"—however, he does not use it when preparing his reviews. He was endorsed by Roger Ebert in 2011, and has been featured on The Howard Stern Show and CNN. He also made videos answering viewers' questions about blindness on another channel entitled The Tommy Edison Experience, and has covered topics such as dreams, colors, Braille and assistive technology.

== Early life and career ==
Edison was born completely blind due to an underdeveloped optic nerve. He was born and raised in Greenwich, Connecticut, and attended Canterbury School and the University of Bridgeport, where he studied music. He has credited his parents for treating him the same as his sighted sisters during his upbringing. His mother went to great lengths to make sure Tommy was put into a normal class rather than the school recommended special education class, stating, "My kid—his cognitive skills are fine, he just can't see." After developing an interest in local and New York radio stations, he was hired as a disc jockey for the station WJAZ in Stamford, Connecticut in 1987, becoming its traffic reporter two years later.
