= The San Diego Union-Tribune =

Daily newspaper in San Diego, California

- May 23, 2015, front page
- Type: Daily newspaper
- Format: Broadsheet
- Owner(s): Southern California News Group (MediaNews Group)
- Founder: William Jeff Gatewood
- Publisher: Ron Hasse
- Editor: Lora Cicalo
- Founded: 1868; 158 years ago (as The San Diego Union)
- Language: English
- Headquarters: 600 B Street; San Diego, California, United States
- Circulation: 26,100 average print circulation; 50,000 digital subscribers
- ISSN: 1063-102X
- OCLC number: 1084359688
- Website: sandiegouniontribune.com

The San Diego Union-Tribune is a metropolitan daily newspaper published in San Diego, California, since 1868. Its name derives from what were San Diego's two major daily newspapers, the morning San Diego Union and the San Diego Evening Tribune, which had the same publisher beginning in 1901 and were frequently referred to collectively as the Union-Tribune; they were merged into a single edition under that name in 1992.

The name was changed to U-T San Diego in 2012 but returned to The San Diego Union-Tribune in 2015.

In 2015, the newspaper was acquired by Tribune Publishing. In 2018, the newspaper, along with the Los Angeles Times, was sold to Patrick Soon-Shiong's investment firm Nant Capital LLC for $500 million plus $90 million in pension liabilities. In 2023, Soon-Shiong sold the paper to Digital First Media, a company owned by Alden Global Capital.

== History ==
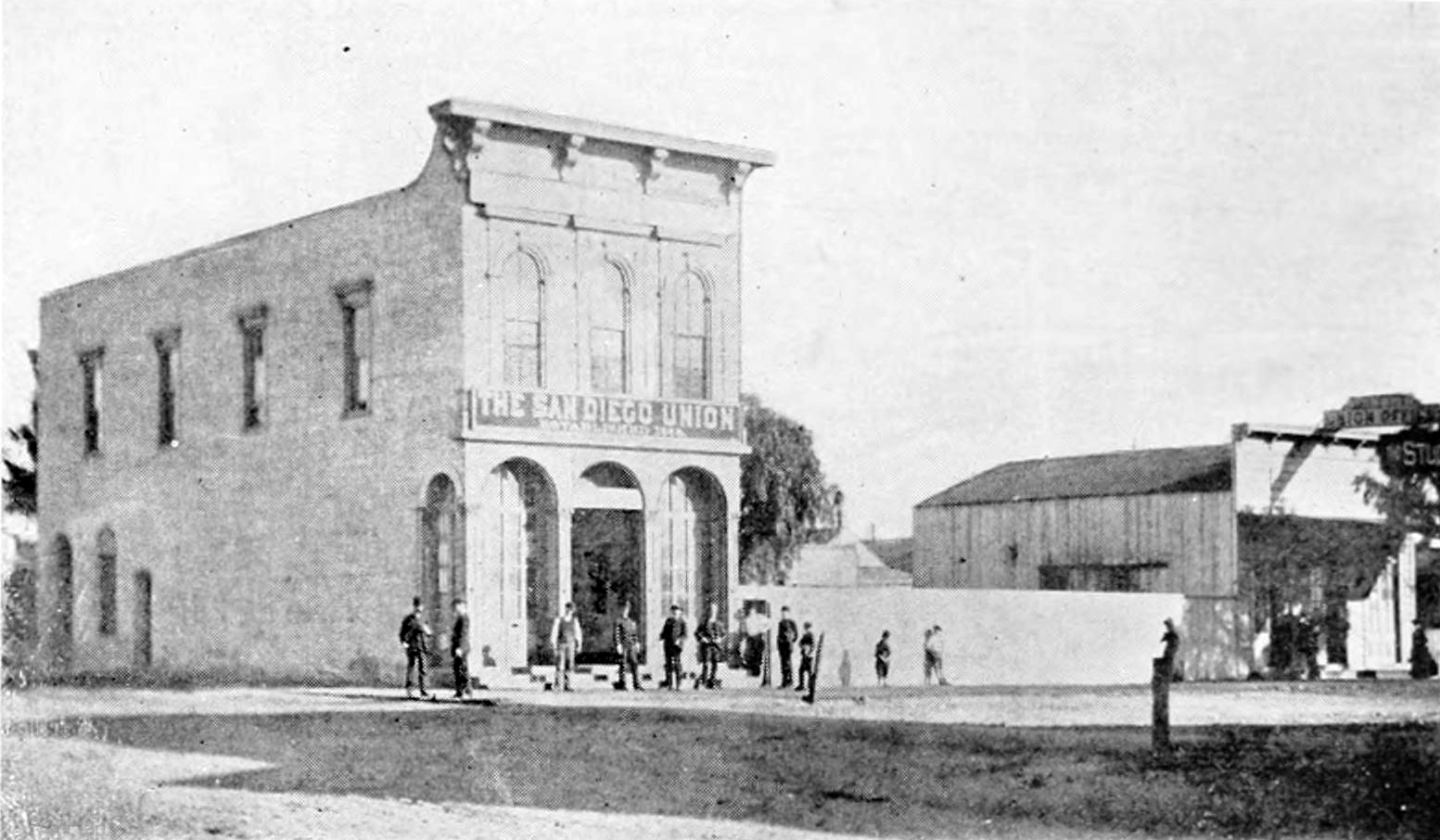
San Diego Union building, c. 1870s

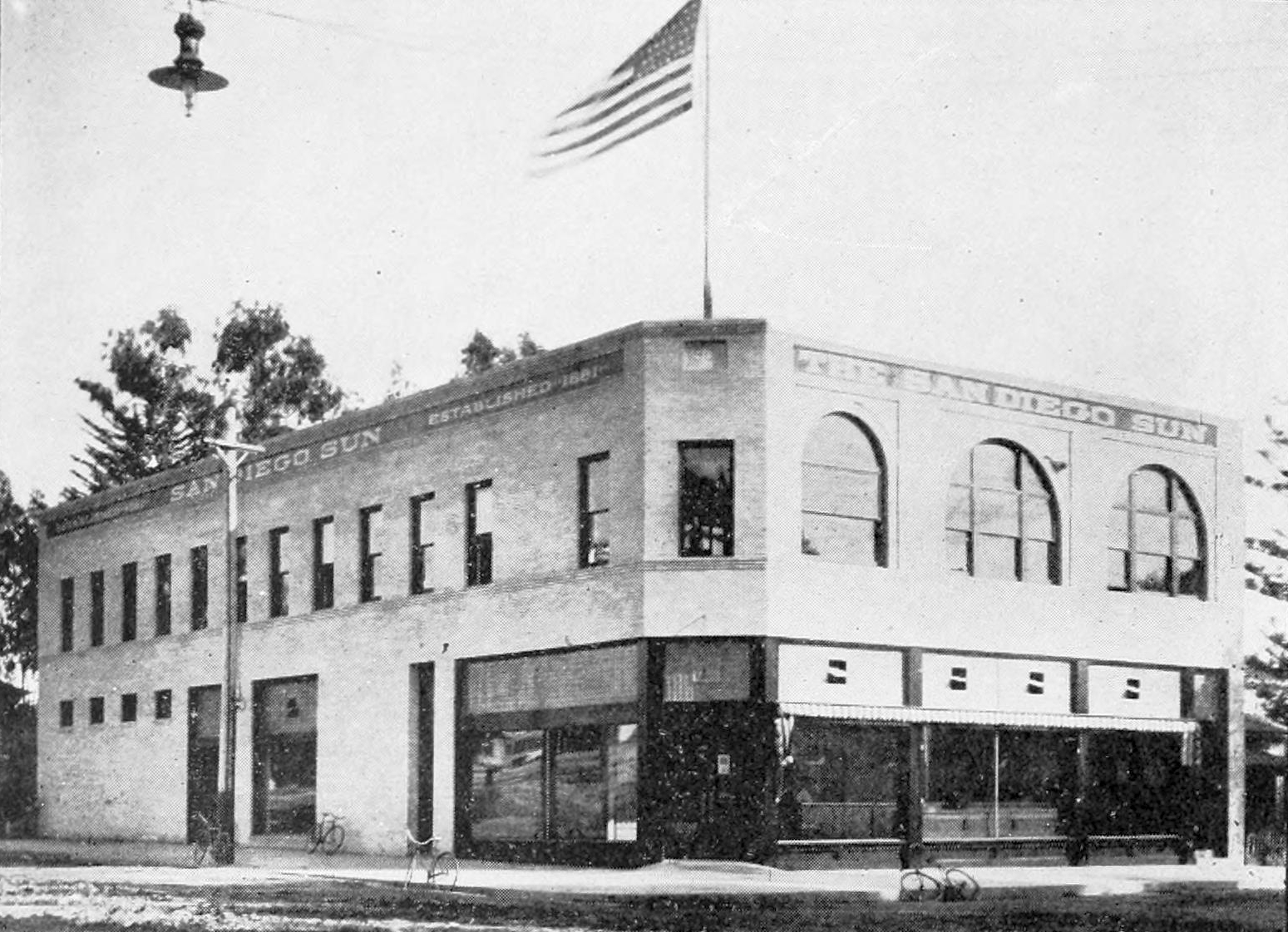
San Diego Sun building, 1908

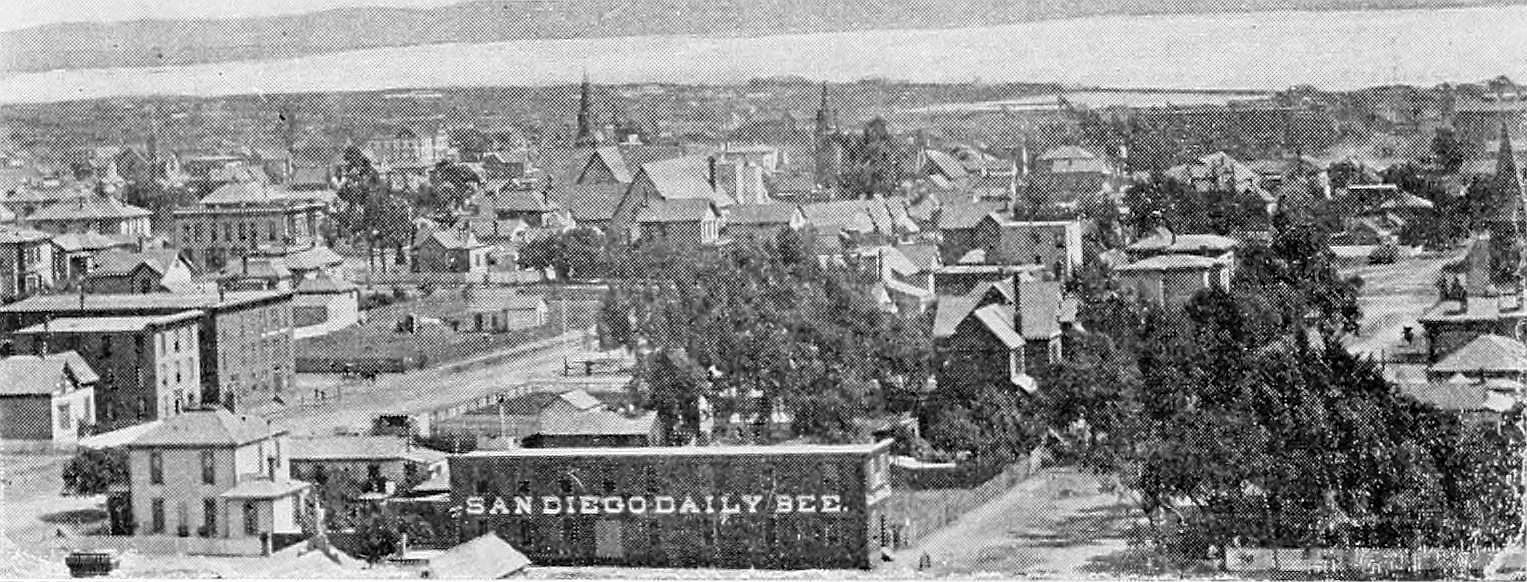
San Diego Daily Bee building, 1908

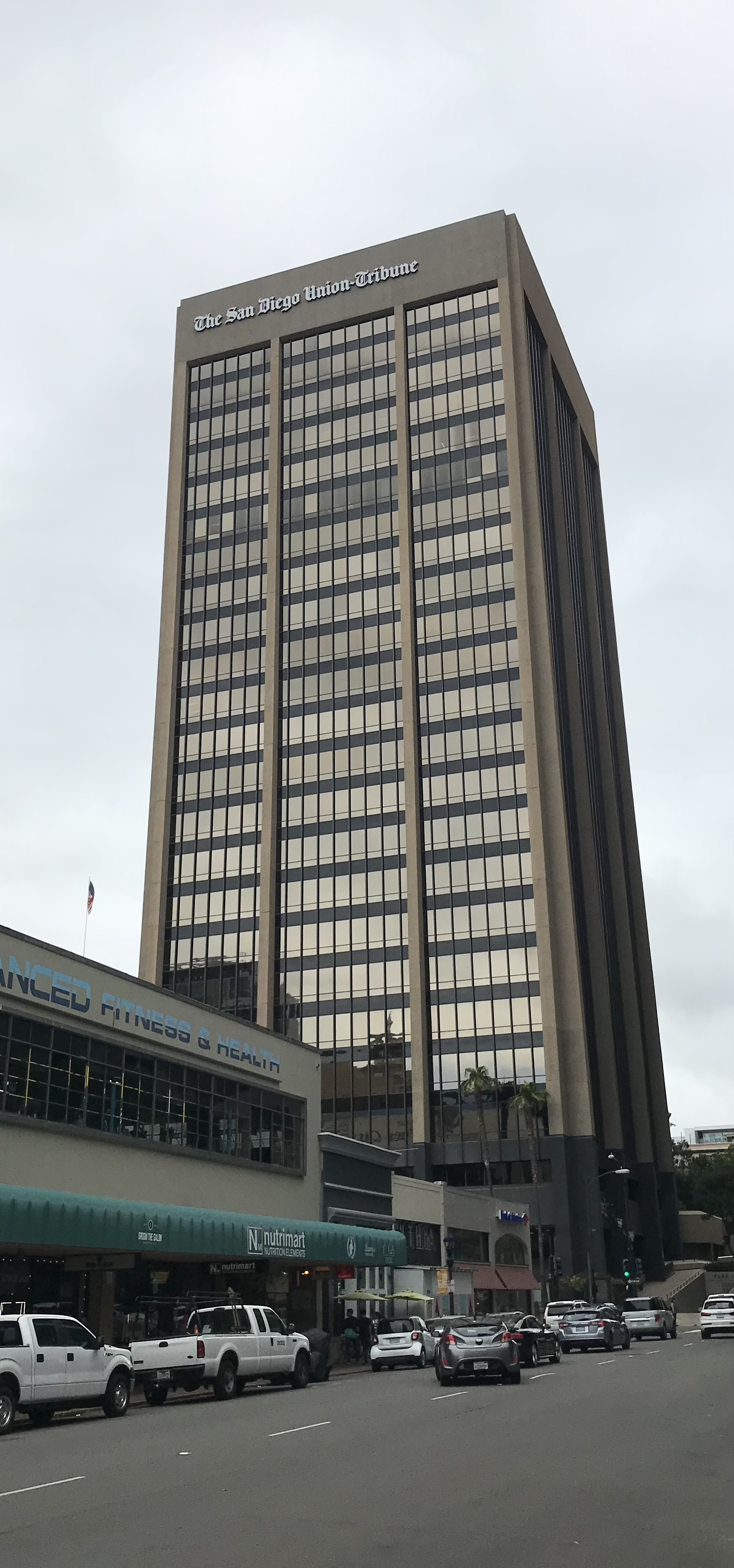
The San Diego Union-Tribune Building, 2022

=== Predecessors ===
The predecessor newspapers of the Union-Tribune were:

- San Diego Herald, founded 1851 and closed April 7, 1860; John Judson Ames was its first editor and proprietor.
- San Diego Sun, founded 1861 and merged with the Evening Tribune in 1939.
- San Diego Union, founded October 3, 1868.
- San Diego Evening Tribune, founded December 2, 1895.

In addition, the San Diego Union purchased the San Diego Daily Bee in 1888, and for a brief time the combined newspaper was named the San Diego Union and Daily Bee.

=== John D. Spreckels ===
In 1890, businessman John D. Spreckels, then living in San Francisco and owner of The San Francisco Call, bought the San Diego Union, followed by his purchase of the San Diego Evening Tribune in 1901. He moved to San Diego after the 1906 San Francisco earthquake, eventually becoming the wealthiest man in the city.

=== Copley Press ===
After Spreckels's death, the Union and Tribune were acquired in 1928 by Copley Press from the J. D. and A. B. Spreckels Investment company.

In 1950 Copley Press acquired the San Diego Daily Journal, merging it into the Evening Tribune. The Union and Evening Tribune were merged into a single edition on February 2, 1992.

The merged newspaper was sold to the private investment group Platinum Equity of Beverly Hills, California, on March 18, 2009.

=== Platinum Equity ===
On August 17, 2010, the Union-Tribune changed its design to improve "clarity, legibility, and ease of use". Changes included being printed on thinner, 100 percent recycled paper, moving the comics to the back of the business section, and abbreviating the title The San Diego Union-Tribune on the front page to U-T San Diego. The U-T nameplate was created by Jim Parkinson, a type designer who also created nameplates for Rolling Stone, Esquire, and Newsweek.

=== MLIM Holdings ===
In November 2011, Platinum Equity sold the newspaper to MLIM Holdings, a company led by Doug Manchester, a San Diego real estate developer and "an outspoken supporter of conservative causes". The purchase price was reportedly in excess of $110 million. Manchester built two landmark downtown hotels, the Manchester Grand Hyatt Hotel and the San Diego Marriott Hotel and Marina. His group also owns the Grand Del Mar luxury resort in San Diego.

=== U-T San Diego ===
Logo between 2012 and 2015

Logo in 2011

On January 3, 2012, the newspaper announced that it would use the name U-T San Diego "on all of our media products and communications"; the newspaper's website (formerly called "SignOn San Diego" and available under SignOnSanDiego.com) would use the name UTSanDiego.com. The official announcement explained the change as being intended to "unify our print and digital products under a single brand with a clear and consistent expectation of quality".

U-T San Diego bought the North County Times in September 2012. On October 15, 2012, the North County Times ceased publication and became the U-T North County Times, which was an edition of the U-T with some North County–specific content. Six months later the U-T North County Times name was dropped and the newspaper became a North County edition of the U-T. In November 2013, the newspaper bought eight more local weekly newspapers (La Jolla Light, Del Mar Times, Rancho Santa Fe Review, Poway News Chieftain, Rancho Bernardo News Journal, the Solana Beach Sun, the Carmel Valley News and the Ramona Sentinel) in the San Diego area, which continued publication under their own names. In 2014, U-T San Diego launched a ninth paper, the Encinitas Advocate.

In 2012, U-T San Diego launched "U-T TV", a cable television channel. It featured news, lifestyle, and editorial content produced by the newspaper's staff, and was created as part of the newspaper's growing emphasis on multi-platform content under Manchester. On February 20, 2014, U-T TV, hampered by not being carried by Time Warner Cable, ended its operation on its two remaining cable outlets. The channel's remaining staff was retained to produce video content for the newspaper's digital properties.

=== Tribune Publishing ownership ===
On May 7, 2015, it was announced that the Tribune Publishing Company, publisher of the Los Angeles Times, the Chicago Tribune, and other newspapers, had reached a deal to acquire U-T San Diego and its associated properties for $85 million. The sale ended the newspaper's 146 years of private ownership. The transaction was completed on May 21, 2015. On the same date, the newspaper reintroduced its previous branding as The San Diego Union-Tribune.

The Union-Tribune and the Los Angeles Times became part of a new operating entity known as the California News Group, with both newspapers led by Times publisher and chief executive officer Austin Beutner. The two newspapers reportedly would retain distinct operations, but there would be a larger amount of synergy and content sharing between them.

The acquisition did not include the newspaper's headquarters, which was retained by Manchester and would be leased by the newspaper.

On May 26, 2015, the newspaper announced it would lay off 178 employees, representing about thirty percent of the total staff, as it consolidated its printing operations with the Times in Los Angeles. In 2016, The San Diego Union Tribune acquired the monthly entertainment magazine Pacific San Diego. On June 13, 2015, at 10:02 p.m. PDT the final run of The San Diego Union Tribune was printed at the San Diego headquarters in Mission Valley began. It was to print the Sunday edition newspaper for June 14, 2015. The following Monday's newspaper would be printed at the Los Angeles Times location. The dismantling of the printing presses in Mission Valley began in mid-September 2015.

=== Purchase by Patrick Soon-Shiong ===
In February 2018, a deal was reached to sell the Union-Tribune to Patrick Soon-Shiong, a physician who has made billions as a biotech entrepreneur. The deal also included the Los Angeles Times and multiple community newspapers. The sale closed on June 18, 2018.

=== Sale to Alden Global Capital ===
On July 10, 2023, it was announced that the U-T was sold to the MediaNews Group, owned by Alden Global Capital, for an undisclosed sum. Soon-Shiong retained ownership of the Los Angeles Times. MediaNews Group already owned about 100 newspapers and is the parent company of the Southern California News Group. MediaNews Group immediately announced that employees would be offered buyouts to resign, and that if not enough employees took up the offer, additional layoffs would be necessary.

In December 2023, the newspaper announced the last issue of U-T en Español, its Spanish-language tabloid, would be published on Dec. 30.

On June 13, 2024, a newly redesigned website was launched, similar to other newspapers in the Alden Global Capital group, replacing a design that was used for the Los Angeles Times.

== Headquarters ==
The newspaper was originally located in Old Town San Diego, and was moved to downtown San Diego in 1871. In 1973, it moved to a custom-built, brick and stone office and printing plant complex in Mission Valley.

The newspaper moved back downtown in May 2016, to offices on the 9th through 12th floors of a tower at 600 B Street. The Union-Tribune was to be the named tenant of the building, replacing Bridgepoint Education and, before that, Comerica.

== Awards ==
=== Pulitzer Prizes ===
- 1979, Breaking News Reporting: San Diego Evening Tribune for its coverage of the PSA Flight 182 jetliner collision with a small plane over North Park.
- 1987, Editorial Writing: San Diego Evening Tribune editorial writer Jonathan Freedman for his editorials urging passage of the first major immigration reform act in 34 years.
- 2006, National Reporting: The San Diego Union-Tribune and Copley News Service (with notable work by Marcus Stern and Jerry Kammer), for their disclosure of bribe-taking that sent former Rep. Randy "Duke" Cunningham to prison "in disgrace". They also received the George Polk Award for these stories.
- 2009, Editorial Cartooning: Steve Breen "for his agile use of a classic style to produce wide ranging cartoons that engage readers with power, clarity and humor".

== Criticisms ==
=== Copleys and Platinum Equity ===
Under the Copleys' ownership, the newspaper had a reliably conservative editorial position, endorsing almost exclusively Republicans for elective office, and sometimes refusing to interview or cover Democratic candidates.

Under Platinum Equity, the newspaper's editorial position "skewed closer to the middle" and showcased multiple viewpoints.

=== Manchester and Lynch ===
When Manchester and business partner John Lynch took ownership in 2011, Lynch stated on KPBS radio that he and Manchester "wanted to be cheerleaders for all that is good in San Diego". Lynch expanded on this position in 2012, saying "We make no apologies. We are doing what a newspaper ought to do, which is to take positions. We are very consistent—pro-conservative, pro-business, pro-military—and we are trying to make a newspaper that gets people excited about this city and its future."

This open promotion of certain viewpoints resulted in criticism from journalism professors and other newspaper editors, who worried that negative news about topics such as the military and business might not be covered. Dean Nelson, director of the journalism program at Point Loma Nazarene University, argued, "Now if you're saying we're going to be the cheerleaders of the military, why would you report on this guy that's taking bribes?... Where's the cheerleading there?" a reference to the Union-Tribune's Pulitzer Prize winning coverage of the Duke Cunningham bribery scandal. A New York Times writer added, "There is a growing worry that the falling value and failing business models of many American newspapers could lead to a situation where moneyed interests buy papers and use them to prosecute a political and commercial agenda. That future appears to have arrived in San Diego."

Lynch said, "We totally respect the journalistic integrity of our paper and there is a clear line of demarcation between our editorials and our news. Our editor, Jeff Light, calls the shots." However, in November 2011 Lynch told the sports editor that the sports pages should advocate for a new football stadium; when a longtime sportswriter wrote skeptically about the idea, he was fired.

==== Downtown redevelopment ====
In January 2012, two months after Manchester bought the U-T, the newspaper featured a front-page proposal for downtown redevelopment, to include a downtown football stadium and an expansion of the San Diego Convention Center. Both properties are adjacent to hotels that Manchester owns.

In September 2012, Investigative Newsource reporter Brooke Williams obtained articles that claimed Lynch "threatened" Port Commissioner Scott Peters, who was running for Congress, "with a newspaper campaign to dismantle the Unified Port of San Diego". In e-mails obtained by Williams, Lynch was quoted as indicating that if the Dole Food Company obtained a long-term contract, that the Port's independence governance would be questioned in editorial coverage. Williams said the effort showed "the extent to which the newspaper's new owners will go to push their vision for a football stadium on the Tenth Avenue Marine Terminal",

==== Endorsements and polling ====
During the 2012 mayoral election the owners of the U-T donated to Republican City Council Member Carl DeMaio's campaign, and the newspaper ran several prominent editorials favoring DeMaio. Those endorsements were wrapped around the front section of the newspaper on a separate page, "as though they were even more important" than the front page.

In October 2012, a poll was taken by the U-T asking respondents to choose between DeMaio and Democratic Congressman Bob Filner in the mayoral election to be held in November. A rival news outlet noted that "Employees of a newspaper, television / radio station, marketing / public opinion research company or the city of San Diego—or who live with someone employed in one of those fields" were excluded from the poll results, which showed the Republican leading the Democrat, 46 percent to 36 percent. Reporter Kelly Davis of SDCityBeat.com wrote: "Common sense dictates that those votes [by city employees or those living with them] would swing in Filner's favor due to DeMaio's long-running feud with city-employee unions." But U-T assignment editor Michael Smolens replied that "city employees were excluded to avoid political entanglements" in other parts of the ballot as well as in the mayor's race. Despite the newspaper's efforts, DeMaio lost to Filner.

Lynch handed day-to-day operations to another executive in February 2014, and editor Jeff Light became company president in January 2015. In 2016, Light was named publisher.

== Publishers ==
- William Jeff Gatewood founded the newspaper, which first published October 10, 1868. He sold his interest to Charles P. Taggart in May 1869.
- Edward "Ned" Wilkerson Bushyhead, 1868–1873. Established the paper with Gatewood after they moved their newspaper publishing partnership from San Andreas to San Diego. Born in Tennessee, Bushyhead (1832–1907) was a miner, publisher and lawman. Part Cherokee, he was the son of Jesse Bushyhead, a Baptist preacher, whom he accompanied from Georgia to Indian Territory on the Trail of Tears at the age of seven. Having moved to San Diego, he became the "silent" publisher of the San Diego Union. In 1873, he sold the newspaper. In 1875, he was elected sheriff of San Diego County and re-elected for a second term in 1884.
- Douglas Gunn, 1871–1886. Gunn (August 31, 1841 – November 26, 1891) was a scholar, publisher, pioneer and Republican politician from California.
- John D. Spreckels, 1890–1926. The son of German-American industrialist Claus Spreckels, he founded a transportation and real estate empire in San Diego.
- Col. Ira C. Copley, 1928–1947
- James S. Copley, 1947–1973. Journalist; publisher of the San Diego Union and San Diego Evening Tribune from 1947 until his death in 1973.
- Helen K. Copley, 1973–2001
- David C. Copley, 2001–2009
- Edward R. Moss, May 2009 – December 2011
- Doug F. "Papa Doug" Manchester, 2011–2015
- Austin Beutner, May – September 2015
- Timothy E. Ryan, September 2015 – March 2016
- Jeff Light, March 2016 – July 2023
- Ron Hasse, beginning July 2023

== Notable people ==
- Steve Breen, cartoonist
- Phil Collier, sportswriter
- Edward L. Fike, editorial page editor
- Thomas Gardiner, manager of the San Diego Union in 1891
- C.H. Garrigues, Sun reporter
- Jerry Magee, sportswriter 1956–2008
- Jack Murphy, sportswriter 1951–1980
- Cathy Scott, correspondent, The San Diego Union-Tribune 1990–1993
- Tim Sullivan, sports columnist 2002–2012
- Gerald Warren, reporter and editor, 1956–1968, 1975–1995; also White House Press Secretary

== See also ==
- List of newspapers in California
- Media in San Diego
