= Steve Breen =

American cartoonist (born 1970)

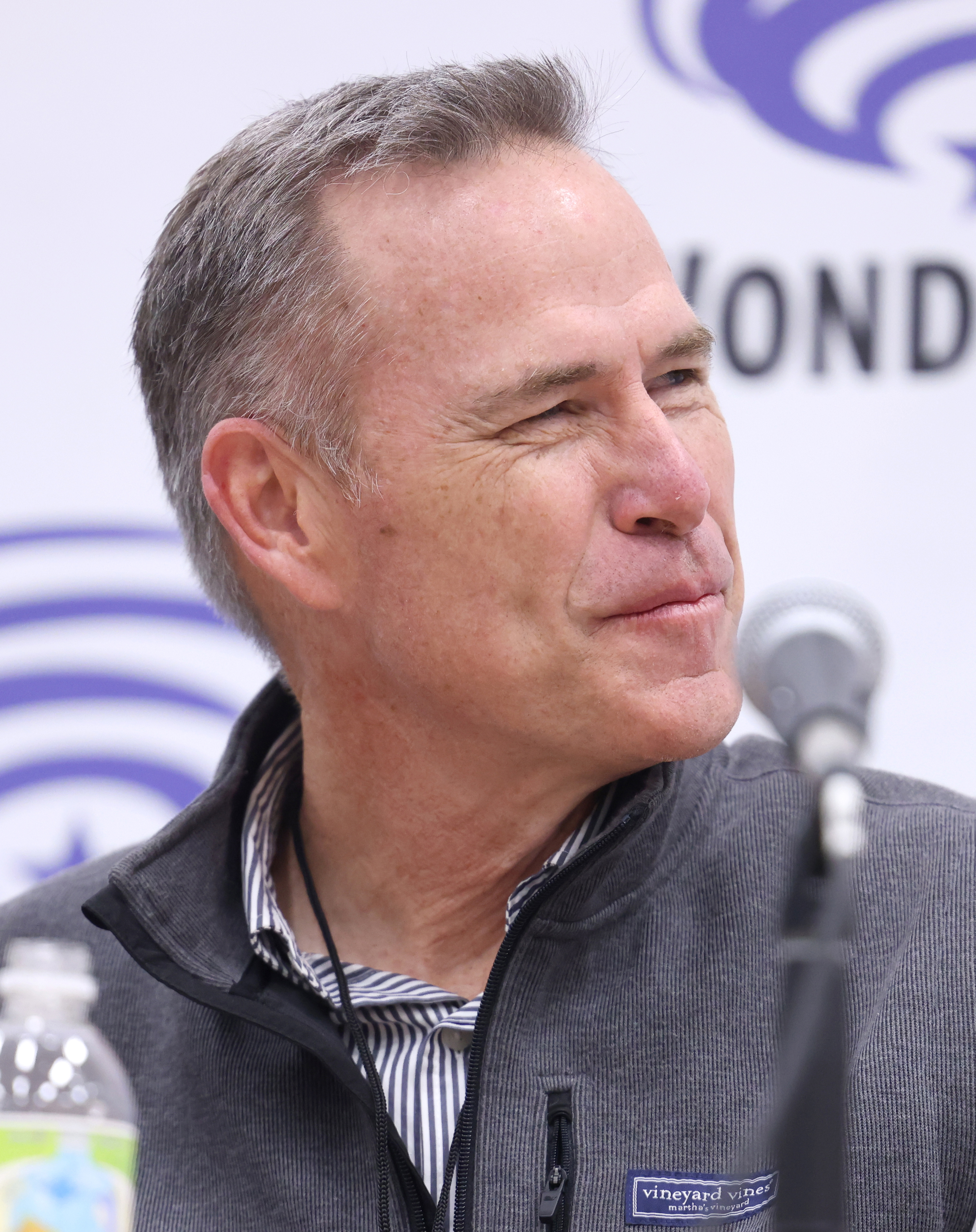
- Breen in 2025
- Born: Stephen Paul Breen; April 26, 1970 (age 56) Los Angeles, California, U.S.
- Areas: Cartoonist, Editorial cartoonist, Illustrator
- Notable works: Grand Avenue (1999–2016)
- Awards: Pulitzer Prize for Editorial Cartooning (1998, 2009)

Stephen Paul Breen (born April 26, 1970) is a nationally syndicated cartoonist. He won the Pulitzer Prize for Editorial Cartooning twice, in 1998 and 2009.

== Biography ==
Steve Breen graduated from Huntington Beach High School in 1988 and attended the University of California, Riverside, where he earned a bachelor's degree in political science. It was at UCR that he started drawing editorial cartoons for his school paper, The Highlander.

In 1991, Breen won the Scripps Howard Charles M. Schulz Award as the top college cartoonist and the John Locher Memorial Award for Outstanding College Editorial Cartoonist. He was influenced by cartoonists such as Jeff MacNelly, Paul Conrad, Pat Oliphant and Don Wright.

Breen was about to become a high school history teacher when the Asbury Park Press offered him a job in the art department in July 1994. He became the full-time editorial cartoonist there in 1996.

Breen's comic strip Grand Avenue, which is syndicated by United Feature Syndicate and appears in more than 150 newspapers across the country, was launched in 1999. In 2005, Breen's colleague Mike Thompson came on board to help write the strip, and in 2009 became official co-creator. In 2014 Thompson took over most writing & art duties; as of 2016 the strip is entirely by Thompson.

In July 2001, Breen returned to his home state to join the staff of The San Diego Union-Tribune. Breen left the Union-Tribune in July 2023 after accepting a buyout package from new owners. He joined the San Diego nonprofit news website inewsource later in the year, where he stayed 18 months before leaving in May, 2025 to become Director of Communications for Cathedral Catholic High School in San Diego. He has continued to produce editorial cartoons for syndication since his departure from the Union-Tribune.

Breen's editorial cartoons are nationally syndicated by Creators Syndicate (which acquired former syndicate Copley News Service in 2008). They regularly appear in The New York Times, USA Today, Newsweek and U.S. News & World Report.

Breen is the author and illustrator of several children's books: Stick, Violet the Pilot, The Secret of Santa's Island, and Woodpecker Wants a Waffle, for which he won the 2017 New Hampshire State Library Ladybug Picture Book Award. Breen also created the cartoon Powerbirds for NBC Universal-owned children's network, Universal Kids, based on his series of children's books.
