= The Times-Reporter =

Newspaper in New Philadelphia, Ohio

- Type: Daily newspaper
- Format: Broadsheet
- Owner: USA Today Co.
- Publisher: Chris White
- Founded: May 18, 1872, as Iron Valley Reporter
- Headquarters: Canton, OH, United States
- Circulation: 9,719 (as of 2018)
- Sister newspapers: The Independent; The Repository; The Suburbanite
- OCLC number: 17415406
- Website: TimesReporter.com

The Times-Reporter is an American daily newspaper published seven mornings a week in Dover, Ohio. It is owned by USA Today Co.

== History ==
The newspaper was created in 1968 through the merger of The Daily Times of New Philadelphia and The Daily Reporter of Dover, Ohio. They remain the principal cities of its coverage area, which also includes the Tuscarawas County communities of Baltic, Bolivar, Dennison, Gnadenhutten, Newcomerstown, Strasburg, Sugarcreek, Tuscarawas, Uhrichsville, and Stone Creek; and some coverage of Carroll, Coshocton, Harrison, Holmes and Stark counties.

GateHouse acquired The Times-Reporter in April 2007 from Copley Press. GateHouse later acquired, and changed its name to, Gannett.

The Times-Reporter is related to three other Gannett newspapers in Northeast Ohio, the dailies The Independent of Massillon and The Repository of Canton, and the weekly The Suburbanite in southern Summit County.
