= William Greider =

American journalist and author (1936–2019)

- Born: William Harold Greider; August 6, 1936; Cincinnati, Ohio, U.S.
- Died: December 25, 2019 (aged 83); Washington, D.C., U.S.
- Education: Princeton University (BA)
- Occupations: Journalist, author
- Known for: author of Secrets of the Temple: How the Federal Reserve Runs the Country
- Spouse: Linda Furry Greider (m. 1961)
- Children: 2
- Website: williamgreider.com (archived 2014)

William Harold Greider (August 6, 1936 – December 25, 2019) was an American journalist and author who wrote primarily about economics.

== Early life and education ==
Greider was born in Cincinnati, Ohio on August 6, 1936, to Harold William Greider, a chemist, and Gladys (McClure) Greider, a writer, and raised in Wyoming, Ohio, a Cincinnati suburb. William Greider went on to study at Princeton University, receiving a B.A. in English in 1958.

== Career and works ==
After college, Greider began his reporting career as a reporter for the Daily Journal, a newspaper in Wheaton, Illinois. It was at that newspaper where he met his future wife, Linda Furry, a fellow reporter.

Greider then worked for The Louisville Times, and was sent to Washington, D.C., in 1966 to cover Washington for The Times and for the Louisville Courier-Journal. He moved to The Washington Post in 1968, where he was a national correspondent, an assistant managing editor for national news, and a columnist. Greider is credited with coining the term "Nader's Raiders" in a Washington Post article dated November 13, 1968.

External videos
- Interview with Greider on Secrets of the Temple, December 18, 1987, C-SPAN
- Presentation by Greider on One World, Ready or Not, January 21, 1997, C-SPAN
- Booknotes interview with Greider on Fortress America, December 13, 1998, C-SPAN
- Presentation by Greider on The Soul of Capitalism, September 29, 2003, C-SPAN

Greider next moved to Rolling Stone magazine, where he worked from 1982 until 1999.

He was national affairs correspondent for The Nation, a progressive political weekly. Prior to his work at The Nation, he worked as an on-air correspondent for Frontline on PBS.

His 2009 book was Come Home, America: The Rise and Fall (and Redeeming Promise) Of Our Country. Before that he published The Soul of Capitalism: Opening Paths to a Moral Economy, which explores the basis and history of the corporation, the existence of employee-ownership as an alternative form of corporate governance, environmental issues, and how important people's contributions are to make the economy a humane one. Given its anticipation of the issues raised by the 2008 securities crisis, Occupy Wall Street, and works with a similar theme by Gar Alperovitz, Richard Wolff, Michael Moore, Noreena Hertz, and Marjorie Kelly, it can be considered an under-recognized work.

Greider also wrote a book on globalization – One World, Ready or Not: The Manic Logic of Global Capitalism (1997) – which suggested vulnerabilities and inequities of the global economy. The credibility of this work was heavily criticized by economist Paul Krugman, who argued that Greider ignored the fallacies of composition that run rampant in the work, misinterpreted facts (some of which were incorrect), and misled readers with false assumptions – all possibly due to his lack of consultation with economists.

Greider's most well-known, powerful and far-reaching work is Secrets of the Temple: How the Federal Reserve Runs the Country (1987), which chronicles the history of the Federal Reserve, and especially from 1979 to 1987 under the chairmanship of Paul Volcker, during the presidencies of Jimmy Carter and Ronald Reagan.

During an October 1, 2008, broadcast interview on the impending passage of the "Wall Street bailout" despite widespread public opposition. Greider observed:

"(T)his is a very revealing moment in American democracy. We're seeing the real deformities and power alignments that govern issues like this, particularly the financial system. (A)ll of the power centers in politics and finance and business are discredited by these events. (W)e had this moment Monday (September 29, 2008) when, for complicated political reasons, a majority in the House rose up and said no. (O)f course ... the broad public ... regards this bailout as a swindle and backwards. (The public wonders 'w)hy are you giving all this money to the people who caused this crisis and taking the money from the public assets of the victims?'"

On January 29, 2009, in an interview with Amy Goodman on Democracy Now!, Greider commented regarding the United States' financial system's financial crisis:

"I've been writing for some months, the system is not just broken and not just injured; it is collapsed. And as long as the government continues to play putting Humpty Dumpty back together again, I think it will fail. That's not an ideological statement. It's just—I think it's the reality."

== Personal life ==
William Greider was married to Linda Furry Greider and they had two children. They resided in Washington, D.C. He died at his home in Washington from congestive heart failure on December 25, 2019.

== Cultural references ==
- The R.E.M. song "Departure" on the album New Adventures in Hi-Fi contains the lyric "Win a eulogy from William Greider".

== Selected works ==
=== Books ===
- The Education of David Stockman and Other Americans, Dutton (New York, NY), 1982. The original December 1981 Atlantic article on Reaganomics can be found here
- Secrets of the Temple: How the Federal Reserve Runs the Country, Simon & Schuster (New York, NY), 1987.
- The Trouble with Money: A Prescription for America's Financial Fever, illustrated by Jeffrey Smith, with photographs by George Lange and charts by Genigraphics Corp., Whittle Direct Books (Knoxville, TN), 1989.
- Who Will Tell the People: The Betrayal of American Democracy, Simon & Schuster (New York, NY), 1992.
- One World, Ready or Not: The Manic Logic of Global Capitalism, Simon & Schuster (New York, NY), 1997.
- Fortress America: The American Military and the Consequences of Peace, PublicAffairs, 1998.
- The Soul of Capitalism: Opening Paths to a Moral Economy, Simon & Schuster (New York, NY), 2003.
