= Canterbury School (Connecticut) =

Private school in New Milford, Connecticut, United States

Location
- 101 Aspetuck Avenue; New Milford, Litchfield County, Connecticut 06776; United States; 41°35′11″N 73°24′45″W

Information
- Type: Private, Day & Boarding School
- Motto: "Supercertari semel traditae sanctis fidei" (To fight valiantly for the faith once delivered to the saints)
- Religious affiliation: Roman Catholic
- Established: 1915 (111 years ago)
- Founders: Nelson Hume and Henry Havemeyer
- CEEB code: 070540
- Head of school: Caroline Blatti
- Faculty: 70
- Grades: 9–12
- Gender: Coeducational
- Enrollment: 325 total 70% boarding 30% day (2023-24 school year)
- Average class size: 12
- Student to teacher ratio: 6:1
- Campus size: 150 acres (2 km²)
- Campus type: Suburban
- Colors: Navy and Columbia Blue
- Athletics conference: NEPSAC
- Sports: 17 sports, 44 Varsity/JV teams
- Team name: Saints
- Rival: The Gunnery
- Accreditation: New England Association of Schools and Colleges
- Publication: PALLIUM (magazine)
- Newspaper: The Tabard
- Yearbook: The Cantuarian
- Endowment: $50 Million
- Tuition: Day – $57,300; Boarding – $77,650 as of 2023-24
- Website: https://www.cbury.org

Canterbury School is a Catholic, college preparatory, coeducational boarding and day independent school for students in grades 9-12 and post-graduate. It is located in New Milford, Connecticut, United States.

== History ==
Canterbury was founded in 1915 on the aspiration of two men: Henry O. Havemeyer, scion of a wealthy family which made its fortune in sugar refining, and Nelson Hume, a Catholic schoolmaster. They intended to establish a Roman Catholic school where young men could be guided in their religion and be prepared to attend Ivy League universities.

The school was established in New Milford, Connecticut, on the location of the former Ingleside School for Girls. Hume became the first headmaster of the school. From its start with 16 enrolled students, Nelson Hume guided the school through two world wars and the great depression until his death in 1948. He was succeeded as headmaster by Walter Sheehan, John Reydel in 1973, Roderick Clarke in 1978, Thomas Sheehy in 1990, Rachel E. Stone in 2016, and Caroline Blatti in 2025. Canterbury became co-educational in the fall of 1971. The School now enrolls around 320 boarding and day students on its campus in New Milford. Canterbury School celebrated its centennial in 2015.

== Facilities ==
=== Residential ===
Canterbury School has seven residence halls that provide housing for about 250 students. Each residence hall contains faculty apartments that range from the size of town houses to smaller one-bedroom suites. Canterbury also has built single family homes on campus, providing housing for some faculty, such as the Headmaster’s House, located on the corner of Aspetuck Avenue and Elkington Farm Road.

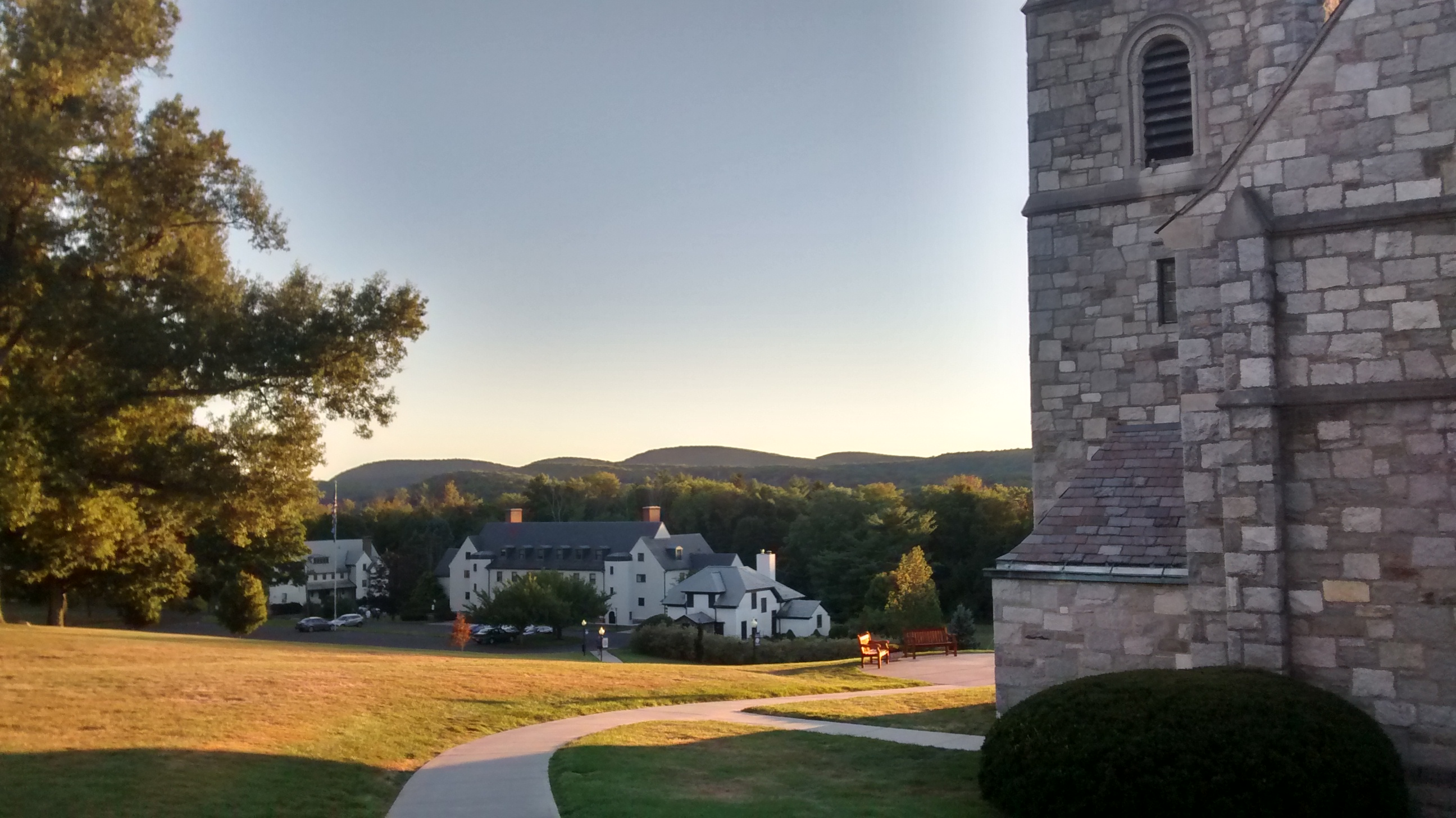
View of Sheehan House from Aspetuck Avenue

=== Academic ===
There are various academic buildings with classrooms and study spaces on campus, including the Steers Center, which houses the Coleman Digital Media Lab, Innovation & Design Lab, and D’Amour Center for Faith, Service & Justice; Robert M. Steele ’72 Hall, where the David C. Copley ’70 Library and Donovan Center for Learning are located; Nelson Hume Hall, which includes Maguire Auditorium; and Old Schoolhouse.

=== Religious ===
Chapel of Our Lady was built in 1928 and expanded in 1959. It can seat 300. Mass is celebrated there every Sunday during the school year. The bottom floor of the chapel contains a classroom. The chapel's carillon is named for alumnus Mel Ferrer '34.

Chaplain’s Residence is the oldest building on campus and has had various uses, including acting as Canterbury’s first chapel.

=== Athletic ===
Outdoor facilities include 8 tennis courts, Hamilton Stadium (a multipurpose turf field and track), Sheehy Family Field (a multipurpose turf field), other multipurpose grass playing fields, and baseball and softball diamonds with dugouts.

Canterbury Offers 19 Varsity Teams in Baseball, Basketball, Field Hockey, Football, Hockey, Lacrosse, Squash, Soccer, Softball, Swimming, Tennis, Volleyball, and Wrestling. All students participate in sports and Canterbury fields Junior Varsity, Thirds and Fourth teams in support of its varsity sports.

The school competes in the New England Preparatory School Athletic Council (NEPSAC).

== Notable alumni and faculty ==
- Jack Arute, sports announcer
- Joseph Campbell, mythologist, professor, author
- David C. Copley, publisher
- Richard Dickson Cudahy, judge of the U.S. Court of Appeals for the Seventh Circuit
- Mike Dunham, NHL goaltender
- Dominick Dunne, writer, investigative journalist, and producer
- Tommy Edison, YouTuber, radio presenter and film critic
- Mel Ferrer, actor and filmmaker
- Frank C. Guinta, former Congressman representing New Hampshire
- William Randolph Hearst III, businessperson and philanthropist
- Gloria Hemingway, physician and son of Ernest Hemingway
- Jimmy Lee (banker), investment banker
- Donovan Mitchell, NBA player and All-Star
- Dan Rusanowsky, announcer for the NHL's San Jose Sharks
- Sargent Shriver, diplomat, politician, and activist
- Gerard C. Smith, diplomat and chief negotiator of SALT I
- Trevardo Williams, NFL linebacker
- Thomas T. Riley, Ambassador
