= The Repository =

Newspaper in Canton, Ohio

- Type: Daily newspaper Mon-Fri, Weekend
- Format: Broadsheet
- Owner: USA Today Co.
- Managing editor: Rick Armon
- Founded: March 30, 1815, as The Ohio Repository
- Headquarters: 500 Market Avenue South, Canton, Ohio 44702, United States
- Circulation: 11,505 Daily (as of 2024)
- Sister newspapers: The Independent; The Review; The Suburbanite; The Times-Reporter
- ISSN: 0745-7545
- Website: CantonRep.com

The Repository is an American daily local newspaper serving the Canton, Ohio area. It is currently owned by USA Today Co. and is part of the USA TODAY Network. The Repository is the oldest continuously run business in Stark County, the oldest continuously published newspaper in Ohio and (as of 2015) the 11th oldest in the U.S.

== History ==
Historically, the newspaper had strong Republican connections, most notably with President William McKinley, who was married to Ida Saxton McKinley, the granddaughter of the paper's founder. The paper eventually changed names from The Ohio Repository to The Canton Repository then to The Repository, currently interchanging the latter two.

- 1815- It was founded on March 30, 1815, by John Saxton, starting as a weekly called The Ohio Repository.
- 1892- The paper began publishing seven days a week.
- 1927- Brush-Moore Newspapers purchased The Repository.
- 1930- The Repository moved into its offices at 500 Market Avenue South, Canton.
- 1967- Thomson Newspapers purchased Brush-Moore and The Repository.
- 2000- Copley Press bought the paper in 2000 when Thomson decided to leave the newspaper business.
- 2007- In April 2007 it was acquired by GateHouse Media.
- 2013- In an efficiency consolidation, the Canton Repository and the Akron Beacon Journal reached agreement to print Akron's newspaper at the Repository's Canton plant.
- 2019- GateHouse Media and Gannett merged. Gannett Co., Inc. became The Repository's next owner.
- 2022- In March publishing reduced to six days a week. Saturday's issue was no longer printed though remained available as an online e-Edition. This transition also occurred at numerous other USA TODAY Network publications.
- 2024- In April newspaper distribution transitioned to U.S. Postal Service (USPS) mail delivery, citing significant workforce and economic challenges maintaining carrier routes. Adopting USPS' Monday to Saturday delivery schedule, the previous Sunday issue was rebranded the Weekend edition. The Massillon Independent and The Alliance Review also implemented this delivery change.

=== The Canton Daily News acquisition ===
The Repository purchased The Canton Daily News in 1927, the year after the gangland assassination of its editor Don Mellett. Months before it was purchased, The Canton Daily News was awarded the 1927 Pulitzer Prize for Public Service, "for its brave, patriotic and effective fight for the ending of a vicious state of affairs brought about by collusion between city authorities and the criminal element, a fight which had a tragic result in the assassination of the editor of the paper, Mr. Don R. Mellett". Established in 1833 as the Stark County Democrat, The Canton Daily News ceased publication July 3, 1930.

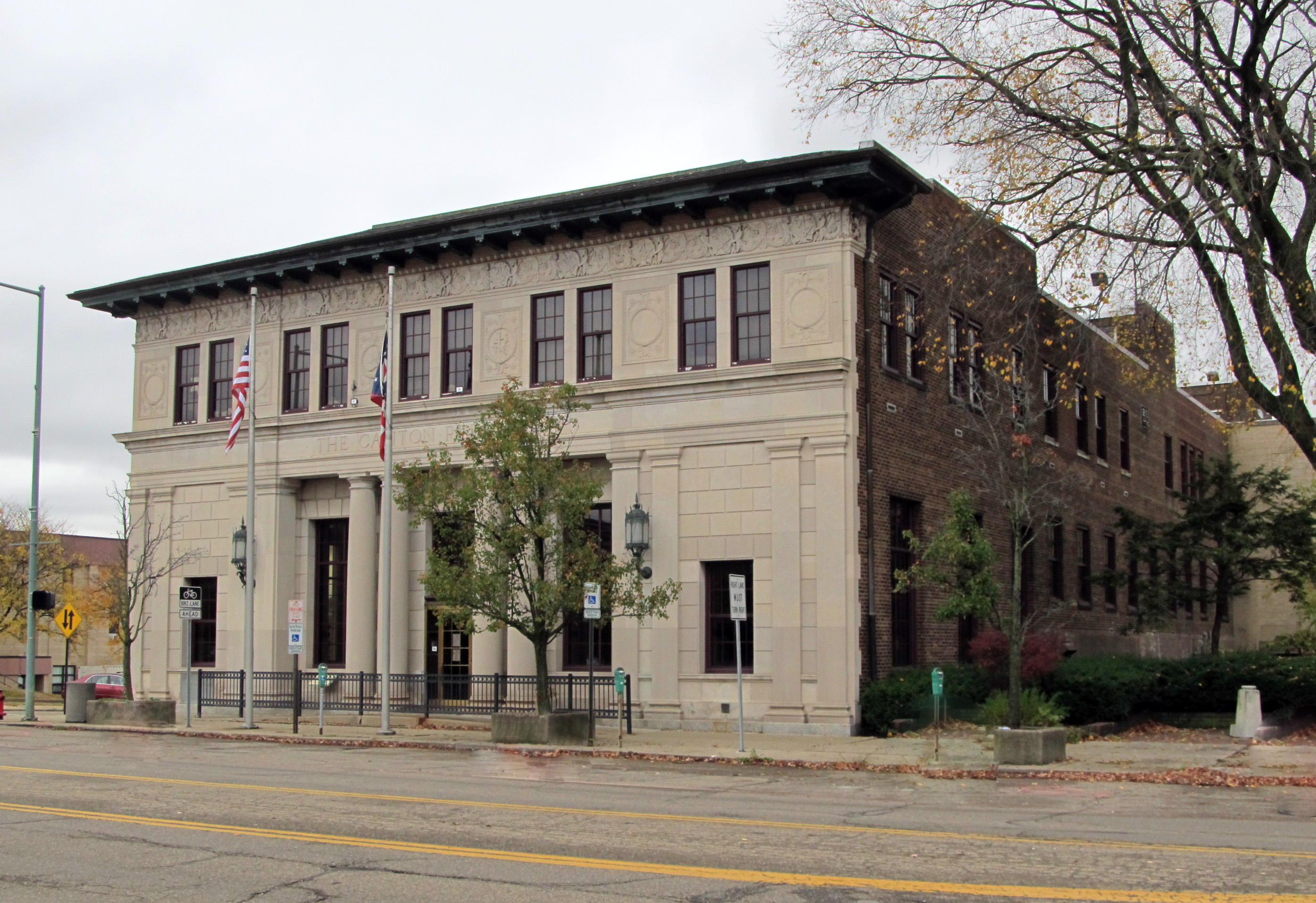
The Repository, Stark County's largest newspaper with offices and publishing at 500 Market Avenue South, Canton, Ohio

== Features and operations ==
Though the newspaper began with strong Republican Party affiliations, current content has moderated. The Repository is a news aggregator contributing limited-to-nil original political content.

=== Newsprint Coverage ===
The Repository newspaper contains daily sections for nation & world, opinion, Stark & Ohio, obituaries, classified ads, sports, advise and comics. Weekly covered sections, some with inconsistent publication days, are:

- (varying)- Real estate, home improvements, food & recipes, restaurant & brewery reviews, Faith, entertainment and activities
- Weekend edition- Births, birthdays, weddings, anniversaries

=== Circulation ===
Selected Circulation Histories
Year	Daily Print	Sunday Print	Paid e-copy	Net Distribution
2004	65,598	-	-	65,598+
2018	26,824	37,854	-	37,854+
2024	9,168	0	2,337	11,505

=== Internet Expansion ===
The company's domain name, cantonrep.com, was created Oct 31, 1996. Articles from The Repository are available on-line in a free preview mode or in full view via subscription.

The CantonRep Facebook page, created January 29, 2009, provides full view coverage of selected articles.

=== Co-Sponsored Community Events ===
- Best of the Best Reader's Choice Contest and awards ceremony covers 200+ categories of professional services and commerce in the Stark County area. It is conducted annually by The Repository and sponsored by the Canton Regional Chamber of Commerce.
- Stark County Home and Garden Show; presented annually by The Repository and the Building Industry Association ("BIA") of Stark County
- Best of Stark Preps high-school athletic awards, Athletes of the Year; presented by The Repository and partners Pro Football Hall of Fame (HOF), Jerzees Sports Grill, Aultman Hospital, Huntington Bank and Kent State University.
- The Canton Repository (HOF Enshrinement) Grand Parade; presented by The Repository.
- The Canton Repository's Regional Final Spelling Bee, hosted by Kent State University at Stark, draws candidates from nearby counties. 2024's 78th spell-off had 34 contestants from Carroll, Holmes, Stark and Tuscarawas counties with the winner advancing to the Scripps National Spelling Bee held in Maryland.

== Sister publications ==
The Repository is related to other Northeast Ohio publications, including:

- The Independent of Massillon, a daily
- The Times-Reporter of New Philadelphia, a daily
- The Alliance Review of Alliance, a daily
- Calendar of Ohio
- Friday Night Ohio
- The Suburbanite in southern Summit County, a weekly
