= List of mayors of Naperville, Illinois =

The following is a list of mayors of the city of Naperville, Illinois, United States.

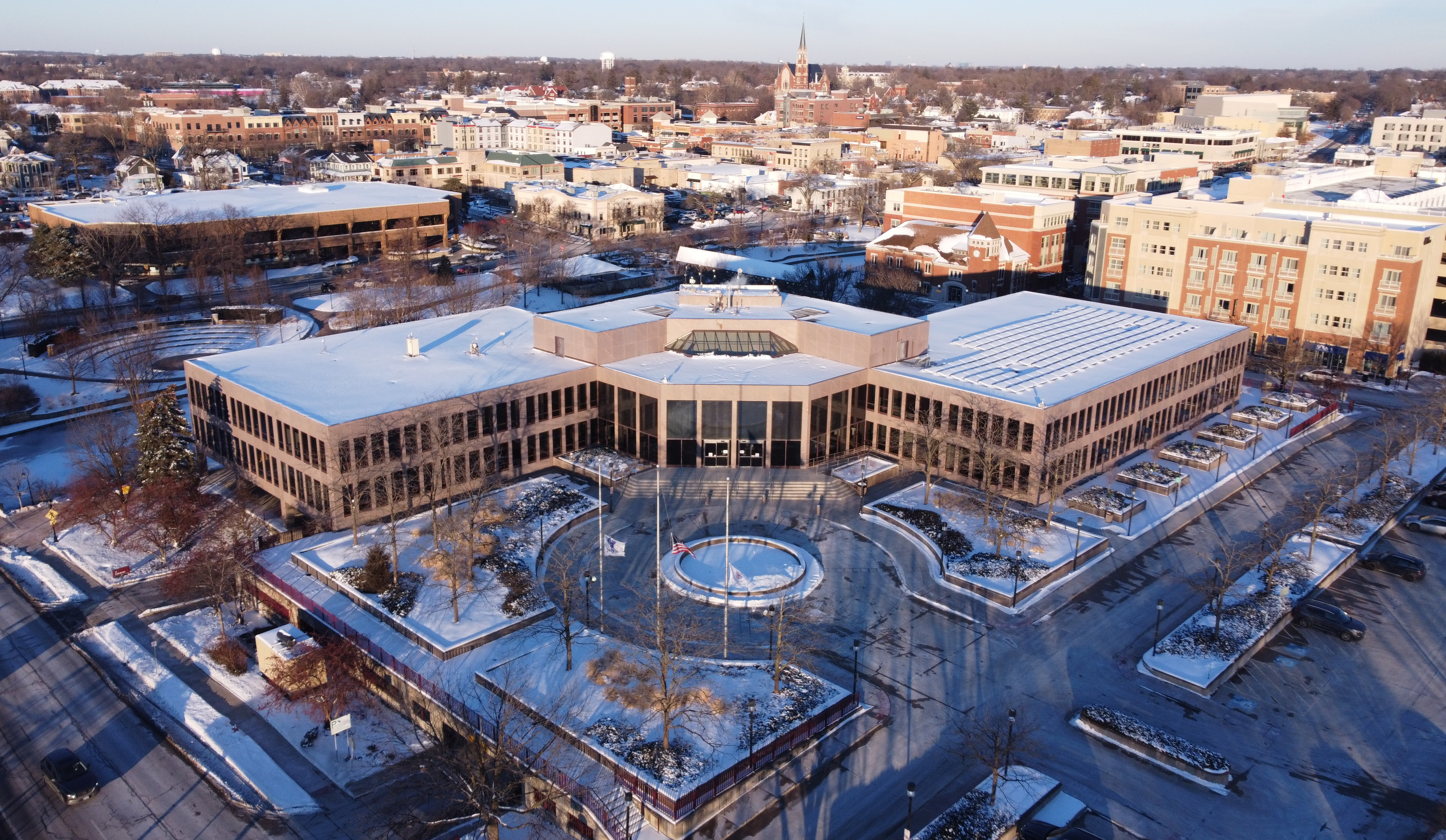
Overview of city hall building in Naperville, Illinois (photo 2022)

- Francis Kendall, 1913–1917
- Charles Bowman, 1917–1921
- Alexander Grush, 1921–1923
- Benjamin Piper, 1923–1927
- Herbert Thompson, 1927–1931
- Alexander Grush, 1931–1935
- James Nichols Jr., 1935–1951
- Charles Wellner, 1951–1959
- William Zaininger, 1959–1967
- Milton Stauffer, 1967–1971
- G. Kenneth Small, 1971–1975
- Chester Rybicki, 1975–1983
- Margaret Price, 1983–1991
- Sam Macrane, 1991–1995
- A. George Pradel, 1995–2015
- Steve Chirico, 2015–2023
- Scott Wehrli, 2023–present

== See also ==
- Naperville history
