= Lincoln Courier =

Newspaper in Lincoln, Illinois

The Lincoln Courier
- Type: Daily newspaper
- Owner: USA Today Co.
- Editor: Jean Ann Miller
- Founded: October 5, 1889, as Lincoln Daily Courier
- Language: English
- Headquarters: 2201 Woodlawn Rd Suite 345, Lincoln, Illinois 62656, United States
- Circulation: 900-1000 Mon-Sat
- Price: $2
- OCLC number: 28096605
- Website: lincolncourier.com

The Lincoln Courier is the only local daily newspaper for Lincoln, Illinois, and its surrounding circulation area, which includes Logan County. The newspaper is owned by USA Today Co. Founded in 1889, the Courier traces its history back to 1855-1856 through one of the newspapers it acquired, the Lincoln Weekly Herald.

Founded as the Lincoln Daily Courier in 1889, the newspaper through the years absorbed several other dailies based in Lincoln, such as the Daily Star (founded c. 1911 as The Lincoln Morning Star) and The Daily News-Herald, which itself dated back to The Daily News (October 20, 1890) and The Lincoln Weekly Herald (c. 1855). Like other businesses founded in Lincoln, Illinois, the Lincoln Weekly Herald was one of the first firms named in honor of then-future President Abraham Lincoln.
