= Lake County News-Sun =

Newspaper in Illinois, United States

- Type: Daily newspaper
- Format: Compact
- Owner: Tribune Publishing
- Founder: Frank H. Just
- Founded: 1892; 133 years ago
- Language: English
- City: Gurnee, Illinois
- Country: United States
- Website: newssun.chicagotribune.com

The Lake County News-Sun is a regional newspaper based in Gurnee, Illinois, United States, that predominantly covers news for Lake County, Illinois, a part of the Chicago metropolitan area. It is currently owned by the Chicago Tribune Media Group, which publishes several other Chicago regional newspapers, including the Pioneer Press. While it once covered news in the region almost exclusively (it staved off a challenge from the Tribune when it opened a Lake County bureau). it has encountered a significant challenge from the Daily Herald since 2000 when that paper opened its Lake County bureau.

== History ==
The paper started out life as the Independent and, later, the Lake County Independent based in Libertyville in 1892. By 1921 the paper was known as the Waukegan Daily News and in 1930 it purchased the Waukegan Daily Sun (founded 1897) and merged the two papers to become the Waukegan News-Sun, a name it would operate under until 1971, when the name "Waukegan" was dropped from the masthead; the hyphen was removed in 1997 to bring the name to its current iteration of News Sun. However, many readers and residents still refer to it as the Waukegan News-Sun to this day.

Founded by Frank H. Just in 1892 it stayed independent and owned by the Just family until sold to Copley Press in 1983, ending a ninety-one-year run as an independent newspaper. Copley in turn sold the paper to Hollinger International in December 2000.

On July 24, 2006, the paper once again reinvented itself as the Lake County News-Sun, a compact-sized, morning-delivery paper. The paper is now available to morning commuters and delivered to subscribers by 6:30 a.m. The size and image change is the biggest transformation the paper has encountered in its long community history.

On September 3, 2007 the Chicago Tribune took over all home delivery and single copy of the News-Sun. In 2014, the Tribune purchased the paper from Wrapports.

== Sources ==
- "Tracing the roots of the News Sun". News Sun. Archived from the original on December 5, 2004.
- Feder, Robert (October 31, 2014). "Tribune buys suburban newspapers from Sun-Times — and Sun-Times buys more time". RobertFeder.com.
