= Mabel A. Shaw =

Notable gambler

Mabel A. Shaw (1880 – June 15, 1962) was noted as the person who held the record of gambling on horse races at Hollywood Park race track in California. She was called "America's No. 1 racing fan."

Except for brief periods of illness, Mrs. Shaw did not miss a day's racing from the park's opening on June 10, 1938, nor did she fail to bet on a single race. When the grandstand burned down in 1949 and the management moved the track's operation to Santa Anita that year, she took an apartment close by to continue her attendance. For most of this time, she was the co-owner of the Inglewood Daily News.

It was calculated that she had wagered on 16,032 horses in placing 5,344 win-place-show bets through June 19, 1953 (668 days of racing). By the time she died on June 15, 1962, she had bet on 9,769 races. When she could not attend because of illness, she sent her wagers with a friend.

"I've come here when I could hardly walk, and I've come fresh out of hospitals. Climbing 500 steps a day to place bets keeps me young," she said about the Hollywood Park grandstand.

Mrs. Shaw said she did not play hunches, but wagered on past performance. In one instance, she could not make up her mind and bet on two horses to win, and they finished in a dead heat.

Her favorite jockeys were Willie Steed, Joe Phillippi, Johnny Longden and Willie Shoemaker. Her favorite horses were Seabiscuit, Sickle Bill and Malicious. She began carrying one of Seabiscuit's racing plates to the turf club at the track, where regular patrons rubbed their tickets on it for good luck.

An original shareholder in the Hollywood Park organization, Mrs. Shaw celebrated all her birthdays at the track except when it was closed during World War II.
