= James S. Copley =

American journalist

- Born: August 12, 1916; St. Johnsville, New York, U.S.
- Died: October 6, 1973 (aged 57); La Jolla, California, U.S
- Education: Yale University
- Occupation: Publisher
- Known for: Copley Press
- Spouse: Margaret Helen Kinney (m. 1964; died 1973)
- Children: David C. Copley (adoptive son)
- Parent(s): Col. Ira C. Copley (adoptive father); Edith Straker (adoptive mother); John & Flora Lodwell (biological parents)
- Military career
- Allegiance: United States of America
- Branch: United States Navy

James Strohn Copley (August 12, 1916 – October 6, 1973) was an American journalist and newspaper publisher. He published the San Diego Union and the San Diego Evening Tribune, both later merged into The San Diego Union-Tribune in 1992, from 1947 until his death in 1973, and was president of the Inter American Press Association (1969–1970).

His politics was "unabashedly conservative, Republican and pro-American". He had close associations with leading Republicans of the era, including Barry Goldwater, Richard Nixon and Spiro Agnew. Copley's presence was a chief reason that the 1972 Republican National Convention was originally planned to be in San Diego.

Copley resided in La Jolla, California, and often stayed at a second home in Borrego Springs, California.

== Biography ==
Copley was born in St. Johnsville, New York, the son of Flora and John Lodwell. His parents died in the Influenza epidemic of 1917–1918. Copley was adopted at age four by Col. Ira Clifton Copley, who later (in 1928) bought the San Diego Union and the San Diego Evening Tribune. Copley graduated from Yale University in 1939. At Yale, he served on the business staff of campus humor magazine The Yale Record with Roy D. Chapin Jr. and Walter J. Cummings Jr.

After college, he went into journalism, becoming the CEO of the Union-Tribune group on Ira Copley's death in 1947. He remained CEO until his death in 1973, when his wife, Helen K. Copley, took over. According to Carl Bernstein, Copley, as CEO of Copley Press, cooperated with the Central Intelligence Agency, which had widespread contacts in the United States media.

== Legacy ==
The University of San Diego has a library named in honor of Copley and his wife (the Helen K. and James S. Copley Library). The Copley Library at Eaglebrook School, which Copley's son David attended, was a gift of James S. Copley.

In 1982, Copley was posthumously inducted into the California Newspaper Hall of Fame.
