= USS Rushmore =

Two ships of the United States Navy have borne the name USS Rushmore, in honor of the Mount Rushmore National Memorial in the Black Hills of South Dakota.

- USS Rushmore (LSD-14) was a Casa Grande-class dock landing ship, launched in 1944 and struck in 1976.
- USS Rushmore (LSD-47) is a Whidbey Island-class dock landing ship, launched in 1989.
