= Naperville Sun =

Newspaper

- Type: Triweekly newspaper
- Owner: Tribune Publishing
- Founder: Harold White
- Ceased publication: July 19, 1935
- City: Naperville, Illinois
- Country: United States
- Website: www.chicagotribune.com/suburbs/naperville-sun/

The Naperville Sun is a newspaper based in Naperville, Illinois, USA. It is published three days a week, Wednesday, Friday and Sunday. It is owned by Tribune Publishing's Chicago Tribune Media Group, a group that also includes the Aurora Beacon News, the Elgin Courier News and the Lake County News Sun, formerly Waukegan News Sun.

== Early years ==
When Harold White and Gordon Haist bought The Naperville Sun for $600 in 1936, the year-old publication was little more than a typewriter, a desk and a name. At the end of The Sun's first year the paper was still being distributed for free to some 2,000 families, and printed in Downers Grove, Illinois, for a fee that exceeded the revenue coming in, while its size had dwindled to four pages. In that first decade, the number of publishing pratfalls was barely exceeded by the will to learn from a bumpy start — and keep the paper in print.

The first Sun, dated July 19, 1935, rolled off the press in Downers Grove under the watchful eye of printer Gordon Isaac, who came to be a mentor to early publishers Harold Moser and Harold White.

Moser launched the paper to compete with the Naperville Clarion. The first edition covered the bases: a report and picture of Elmer Yanke's car versus tree collision; gate receipts from 4,298 nonresident visitors to Centennial Beach; the "matrimonial plunge" of Harold Kopp and Esther Topp; a classified ad section; sports; even Cromer Motor Companies used cars. Column two on the front proclaimed "Rising gloriously in the eastern horizon, the sun reigns supreme over the entire earth each and every day. So also The Naperville Sun, upon its inaugural edition ... and on each successive week, it will reign supreme in offering you the latest and most complete stories on sports, news and social gatherings."

The paper attracted local boy Harold White. He offered to do most of the writing as well as to proofread stories and set type. Moser could not afford to pay him. Within months, though, the 21-year-old Moser was offering to sell the newspaper to his 22-year-old employee. Moser was not exactly finished in Naperville, though. He went on to found Moser Lumber and the Macom Corp. and build Naperville from a farming town to a booming suburb.

White married Eva Anderson, an art student he fell for at North Central College. She sold advertisements while White handled production. By Christmas 1939, they had sold 1,075 subscriptions, at $1 per year. By the late 1930s, business was going so well that White stopped paying $25 monthly rent at the Old Spanish Tea Room at 128 S. Washington St. and bought the building that served as The Sun's headquarters until 1965.

== 1990-on ==
In 1991, Copley Press purchased The Sun from White. Eva White died in 1990; Harold White died in 1993. Publication increased from one day a week to three.

The Naperville Sun has a circulation of over 20,000 households while reaching 50,000 Naperville adults. Its competitors include The Daily Herald.

The Sun's sports section won honors from the Associated Press Sports Editors in daily, Sunday and special section competitions in its first three years as a daily paper. In 2014, the Chicago Tribune Media Group purchased the paper.
