= Copley Press =

American newspaper publisher (c. 1905–2009)

- Type: Private
- Founded: c. 1905; 121 years ago
- Founder: Ira Clifton Copley
- Defunct: 2009; 17 years ago
- Fate: Dissolved
- Products: Newspapers
- Owner: Copley family
- Subsidiaries: The San Diego Union-Tribune; Copley News Service

Copley Press was a privately held newspaper business, founded in Illinois but later based in La Jolla, California. The company operated in California, Illinois and Ohio. Its flagship paper was The San Diego Union-Tribune.

== History ==
=== Origins ===
Col. Ira Clifton Copley was a successful politician and industrialist who operated an electric and gas company in Illinois in the early 1900s. He used his accumulated wealth to purchase local papers. Copley bought the Aurora Beacon in December 1905, then sued its rival, the Aurora News, for libel in April 1909, seeking $250,000 in damages. Copley acquired the Elgin Courier in August 1911, the News in December 1911, and then a month later merged it with the Beacon to form the Aurora Beacon-News. In August 1913, Copley acquired a stake in the Joliet Daily Herald and Joliet Daily News, and in April 1915, merged the two to form The Herald-News.

In December 1925, Copley purchased the Elgin Daily News, and then merged it with the Courier to form the Elgin Courier-News. In January 1926, Copley sold his holdings in the Western Electric Gas and Electric company and its affiliated businesses, the sale price $30 million, and soon went on a newspaper spending spree. He bought the Illinois State Journal in January 1928, the San Diego Union and its evening Tribune edition, also in January 1928, followed by 15 newspapers in Southern California from Kellogg Newspapers in February 1928. Later that year, Senator George W. Norris accused Copley Press of receiving money from public utility companies, but Copley successfully defended his position before the Federal Trade Commission in 1929. The Santa Monica Evening Outlook was sold off in exchange for full ownership of the Glendale News-Press in 1932.

=== Expansion ===
Copley ran his newspaper chain until 1942, when he retired and was succeeded by Audus W. Shipton. That same year, Copley Press leased the Illinois State Register. In 1944, the company opened a news bureau in Washington, D.C. for its 17 newspapers across Illinois and California. In 1947, company founder Ira Clifton Copley died at age 83. In 1950, the Burbank Daily Review was acquired. In 1953, the company expanded into television by acquiring KLAC-TV in Los Angeles. In July 1955, William C. Copley sued his adoptive brother James S. Copley for control of the company and to liquidate it.

In September 1955, the Copley News Service, a wire service that distributed news, political cartoons, and opinion columns, was formed. In July 1957, James S. Copley reached a settlement with his brother and bought him out, thus gaining full control of Copley Press. At that time the company owned 16 newspapers with a total circulation of 426,404. In December 1957, KLAC-TV was sold off for $4 million to a group head by singer Bing Crosby. In 1961, Shipton retired as president after spending 45 years working at the company. James S. Copley was then elected as his replacement, and Shipton died three years later.

In 1966, Copley acquired The Sacramento Union for $2.64 million. In 1969, Copley sold the Venice Vanguard and two other papers to Edwin W. Dean Jr., publisher of the Inglewood Daily News. In 1971 the Daily Journal (Wheaton, Illinois) was acquired. In October 1973, James S. Copley died at age 57 of cancer, and then his widow Helen K. Copley succeeded him as company chairman. In May 1974, the Illinois State Journal and Illinois State Register were merged for form The State Journal-Register. That same month, the Glendale News-Press, Burbank Review and 11 other Los Angeles area papers (four dallies, nine weeklies) were sold to Morris Communications. Two dallies and two weeklies from the group closed over several months following the sale. In December 1974, The Sacramento Union was sold off.

In 1982, James S. Copley was posthumously inducted into the California Newspaper Hall of Fame. In 1983, the Lake County News-Sun was acquired. In 1985, the Lincoln Courier was acquired. In 1991, Copley acquired The Naperville Sun, and four other newspapers from Harold White. In 1992, Copley's two San Diego papers were merged to form The San Diego Union-Tribune. In 1996, the Peoria Journal-Star and Galesburg Register-Mail were acquired for $174.4 million. In 2000, Copley expanded into Ohio after buying the Canton Repository from Thomson Corp. Later that year The Times-Reporter of Dover, Ohio and the Massillon Independent were acquired.

=== Dissolution ===
In June 2000, Copley expanded into Ohio after buying the Canton Repository from Thomson Corp. In October 2000, Copley sold its four Chicago-area dallies (The Herald News, The Beacon News, Elgin Courier-News and The News Sun) to Hollinger International. In December 2000, The Times-Reporter of Dover, Ohio and the Massillon Independent were acquired. In April 2001, Helen K. Copley stepped down as chairman and was replaced by her son, David C. Copley. In August 2004, she died at age 81.

In December 2006, the Daily Breeze was sold to Hearst in a complex transaction that in the end left the paper to MediaNews Group. In March 2007, GateHouse Media acquired the company's remaining nine Midwest papers for $380 million. The sale included Galesburg Register-Mail, Lincoln Courier, Peoria Journal Star and The State Journal-Register in Illinois, along with the Canton Repository, The Times-Reporter and Massillon Independent in Ohio.

In May 2008, Creators Syndicate acquired the Copley News Service. Afterward, it was renamed to the Creators News Service and no longer distributed original news content, only syndicated copy. In March 2009, The San Diego Union-Tribune was sold to Platinum Equity. In November 2012, David C. Copley died at age 60.

== Allegations of collaboration with CIA and FBI ==
In 1977, an article published in Penthouse claimed Copley Press was used as a front by the Central Intelligence Agency. Reporters Joe Trento and Dave Roman wrote that James S. Copley, who served as publisher until 1973, had cooperated with the CIA since its founding in 1947. They also reported that a subsidiary division, Copley News Service, was used in Latin America by the CIA as a front. Trento and Roman also said that reporters at the Copley-owned San Diego Union and Evening News spied on antiwar protesters for the FBI. They alleged that, at the height of these operations, at least two dozen Copley employees were simultaneously working for the CIA. James S. Copley was also accused of involvement in the CIA-funded Inter-American Press Association. The company denied these allegations.

== Company president/chairman ==
- Ira Clifton Copley — 1905–1942
- Audus W. Shipton — 1942–1961
- James S. Copley — 1961–1973
- Helen K. Copley — 1973–2001
- David C. Copley — 2001 to 2009

== Former properties ==
List of previously owned newspapers
Name	Location
Alhambra Post-Advocate	Alhambra, California
Aurora Beacon-News	Aurora, Illinois
Burbank Daily Review	Burbank, California
Daily Breeze	Hermosa Beach, California
Daily Journal (Wheaton, Illinois)	Wheaton, Illinois
Elgin Courier-News	Elgin, Illinois
Galesburg Register-Mail	Galesburg, Illinois
Glendale News-Press	Glendale, California
Lake County News-Sun	Gurnee, Illinois
Lincoln Courier	Lincoln, Illinois
Massillon Independent	Massillon, Ohio
Naperville Sun	Naperville, Illinois
Peoria Journal Star	Peoria, Illinois
San Pedro News-Pilot	San Pedro, California
The Herald-News	Joliet, Illinois
The Repository	Canton, Ohio
The Sacramento Union	Sacramento, California
The San Diego Union-Tribune	San Diego, California
The Santa Monica Evening Outlook	Santa Monica, California
The State Journal-Register	Springfield, Illinois
The Times-Reporter	New Philadelphia, Ohio
Venice Evening Vanguard	Venice, California

=== Other properties ===
- Copley News Service
- KCOP-TV
