= List of newspapers in Illinois =

This is a list of newspapers in Illinois.

== Daily newspapers ==
- The Beacon-News – Aurora
- Belleville News-Democrat – Belleville
- Belvidere Daily Republican – Belvidere
- The Benton Evening News – Benton
- The Breeze-Courier – Taylorville
- Centralia Morning Sentinel – Centralia
- The Chicago Defender – Chicago
- Chicago Sun-Times – Chicago
- Chicago Tribune – Chicago
- The Clay County Advocate-Press – Flora
- Commercial-News – Danville
- Community News Brief – Macomb
- The Courier-News – Elgin
- Daily Chronicle – DeKalb
- Daily Gazette – Sterling
- Daily Herald – Arlington Heights
- Daily Journal – Kankakee
- The Daily Leader – Pontiac
- The Daily Ledger – Canton
- Daily Record – Lawrenceville
- The Daily Register – Harrisburg
- The Daily Republican – Marion
- Daily Republican Register – Mt. Carmel
- Daily Review Atlas – Monmouth
- Daily Southtown – Tinley Park
- The Dispatch – Moline
- Du Quoin Evening Call – Du Quoin
- Edwardsville Intelligencer – Edwardsville
- Effingham Daily News – Effingham
- Herald & Review – Decatur
- The Herald-News – Joliet
- Journal-Courier – Jacksonville
- Journal Gazette & Times-Courier – Mattoon
- The Journal Standard – Freeport
- Journal Star – Peoria
- Kane County Chronicle – Geneva
- Lake County News-Sun – Waukegan
- Lincoln Courier – Lincoln
- The McDonough County Voice – Macomb
- Morris Daily Herald – Morris
- Mt. Vernon Morning Sentinel – Mt. Vernon
- Naperville Sun – Naperville
- The News-Gazette – Champaign
- News-Tribune – LaSalle
- Northwest Herald – Crystal Lake
- Olney Daily Mail – Olney
- The Pantagraph – Bloomington
- Paris Beacon-News – Paris
- Pekin Daily Times – Pekin
- Quincy Herald-Whig – Quincy
- The Register-Mail – Galesburg
- Robinson Daily News – Robinson
- The Rock Island Argus – Rock Island
- Rockford Register Star – Rockford
- Shelbyville Daily Union – Shelbyville
- The Sidell Reporter – Sidell
- The Southern Illinoisan – Carbondale
- Star Courier – Kewanee
- The State Journal-Register – Springfield
- The Telegraph – Alton
- The Telegraph – Dixon
- The Times – Ottawa

== Weekly and bi-weekly newspapers ==
=== Bond County ===
- Greenville Advocate – Greenville

=== Boone County ===
- The Boone County Journal – Belvidere

=== Bureau County ===
- Bureau County Republican – Princeton
- Indian Valley Chief – Tiskilwa

=== Calhoun County ===
- Calhoun News Herald – Hardin

=== Carroll County ===
- Carroll County Review – Thomson
- Mount Carroll Mirror-Democrat – Mount Carroll
- Prairie Advocate News – Lanark
- Savanna Times Journal – Savanna

=== Cass County ===
- Cass County Star-Gazette – Beardstown
- La Estrella de Beardstown – Beardstown

=== Christian County ===
- Morrisonville Times – Morrisonville
- Pana News – Pana

=== Coles County ===
- The Leader – Coles County

=== Cook County ===
- Austin Weekly News – Oak Park
- Berwyn Suburban Life – Berwyn and Cicero
- Bridgeport News – Chicago
- The Chicago Crusader – Chicago
- Chicago Jewish News – Skokie
- Chicago Journal – Chicago
- Chicago Reader – Chicago
- Chicago Shimpo – Chicago
- Desplaines Valley News – Summit
- Forest Park Review – Forest Park
- Greek Press – Chicago
- Hyde Park Herald – South Side of Chicago, especially Hyde Park and Kenwood neighborhoods
- La Grange Suburban Life – La Grange
- Lemont Suburban Life – Lemont
- Oak Park Journal – Oak Park
- The Lincolnwood Times - Lincolnwood
- The Reporter – Palos Heights
- Riverside & Brookfield Suburban Life – Riverside and Brookfield
- Riverside-Brookfield Landmark – Riverside and Brookfield
- Skokie Review – Skokie
- South Side Weekly – Chicago
- Wednesday Journal – Oak Park and River Forest
- Windy City Times – Chicago

=== DeWitt County ===
- The Clinton Journal – Clinton

=== DuPage County ===
- Addison Suburban Life – Addison
- Carol Stream Suburban Life – Carol Stream
- Downers Grove Suburban Life – Downers Grove
- Elmhurst Suburban Life – Elmhurst
- Glen Ellyn Suburban Life – Glen Ellyn
- Hinsdale Suburban Life – Hinsdale, Burr Ridge, Clarendon Hills, Darien and Oak Brook

=== Fayette County ===
- Farina News – Farina
- The Leader-Union – Vandalia
- Ramsey News-Journal – Ramsey
- St. Elmo Banner – St. Elmo
- St. Elmo Devonian – St. Elmo

=== Fulton County ===
- Astoria South Fulton Argus – Astoria
- Fulton Democrat – Lewistown

=== Gallatin County ===
- Gallatin Democrat – Shawneetown
- Ridgway News – Ridgway

=== Greene County ===
- Greene County Shopper – Carrollton
- Greene Prairie Press – Carrollton

=== Hancock County ===
- Augusta Eagle-Scribe – Augusta
- Hancock County Quill – La Harpe

=== Hardin County ===
- Hardin County Independent – Elizabethtown

=== Henderson County ===
- Henderson County Quill – Stronghurst

=== Henry County ===
- Cambridge Chronicle – Cambridge
- Geneseo Republic – Geneseo
- Orion Gazette – Orion

=== Iroquois County ===
- The Advocate – Clifton
- Cissna Park News – Cissna Park
- The Lone Tree Leader – Onarga

=== Jackson County ===
- Carbondale Times – Carbondale
- Murphysboro American – Murphysboro (ceased publications in summer 2015)

=== Jersey County ===
- Jersey County Journal – Jerseyville
- Jersey County Star – Jerseyville

=== Johnson County ===
- Vienna Times – Vienna

=== Kane County ===
- Batavia Republican – Batavia
- Fox Valley Labor News – Aurora
- Fox Valley News Shopper – Yorkville, Oswego, Sandwich, Sugar Grove
- Geneva Republican – Geneva
- The Voice – Aurora

=== Kankakee County ===
- Country Herald – Bourbonnais

=== Kendall County ===
- Fox Valley News Shopper – Yorkville, Oswego, Sandwich, Sugar Grove, Plano

=== Knox County ===
- Abingdon/Avon Argus Sentinel – Abingdon
- The Paper – Knox County
- The Register-Mail – Galesburg
- The Zephyr – Knox County

=== Lake County ===
- Barrington Suburban Life – Barrington
- Lake County Suburban Life – Grayslake (formerly the Lake County Journal)
- The North Shore Weekend - North Shore

=== LaSalle County ===
- The Streator Voice – Streator

=== Lee County ===
- Sauk Valley Newspapers – Lee County

=== Macon County ===
- African-American Voice (H.G. Livingston, pub.) – Decatur (succeeds The Voice of the Black Community, published in Springfield)
- The Blue Mound Leader – Blue Mound
- Decatur Tribune – Decatur

=== Macoupin County ===
- Bunker Hill Gazette-News – Bunker Hill
- Coal Country Times – Gillespie
- Girard Gazette – Girard
- Macoupin County Enquirer~Democrat – Carlinville
- Northwestern News – Palmyra
- Southwestern Journal – Brighton
- Staunton Star Times – Staunton
- Virden Recorder – Virden

=== Madison County ===
- AdVantage News – Alton
- Highland News Leader – Highland
- Madison County Chronicle – Worden
- The Madison / St. Clair Record – Edwardsville
- Troy Tribune – Troy

=== Mason County ===
- Mason County Democrat – Havana

=== Massac County ===
- The Metropolis Planet – Metropolis
- The Southern Scene – Metropolis

=== McDonough County ===
- Macomb Eagle – Macomb

=== McHenry County ===
- Sun Day – Huntley
- My Huntley News -- Huntley

=== Menard County ===
- The Petersburg Observer – Petersburg

=== Mercer County ===
- The Times Record – Aledo

=== Monroe County ===
- Monroe County Independent-News – Columbia
- Republic-Times-News – Waterloo

=== Montgomery County ===
- The Journal-News – Hillsboro
- Nokomis Free Press-Progress – Nokomis

=== Moultrie County ===
- News Progress – Sullivan

=== Ogle County ===
- Rochelle News-Leader – Rochelle

=== Peoria County ===
- Chillicothe Times-Bulletin – Chillicothe

=== Piatt County ===
- The Journal Republican-Monticello – Monticello

=== Pike County ===
- The Paper – Barry
- The Pike County Express – Pittsfield
- Pike Press – Pittsfield

=== Pope County ===
- The Herald Enterprise – Golconda

=== Putnam County ===
- The Putnam County Record – Granville

=== Richland County ===
- Olney Daily Mail – Olney

=== St. Clair County ===
- The Madison / St. Clair Record – Edwardsville

=== Sangamon County ===
- Illinois Times – Springfield
- The Sangamon Star
- The Sentinel (Wilson Publications, pub.; 2004− ) – Illiopolis
  - preceded by Illiopolis Sentinel (Frank J. Bell, pub.; 19??−2004) – Illiopolis
  - preceded by Niantic-Harristown County Line Observer (Cindy Wilson, pub.; 2001−2004) – Illiopolis

=== Stark County ===
- The Stark County News – Toulon

=== Tazewell County ===
- Delavan Times – Delavan

=== Union County ===
- Gazette-Democrat – Anna

=== Warren County ===
- Roseville Independent – Roseville

=== Washington County ===
- The Washington County News – Nashville

=== Whiteside County ===
- Erie Review – Erie
- Fulton Journal – Fulton
- Prophetstown Echo – Prophetstown
- Whiteside Sentinel – Morrison

=== Will County ===
- The Frankfort Station – Frankfort
- The Homer Horizon – Homer Glen
- KSKJ Voice (formerly Amerikanski Slovenec; bi-monthly) – Joliet
- The Mokena Messenger – Mokena
- The New Lenox Patriot – New Lenox

=== Winnebago County ===
- Rock River Times – Rockford

== Monthly newspapers ==
- Chicago Dispatcher – Chicago
- The Marengo-Union Times – Marengo
- The Nauvoo Honeybee – Nauvoo

== Foreign-language newspapers ==
- Arbeiter-Zeitung – Chicago
- Bulgaria SEGA Newspaper (Hoffman Estates) - Est 2005 – Bulgarian
- Den Danske Pioneer (The Danish Pioneer) – Hoffman Estates (Danish)
- Dziennik Związkowy (Polish Daily News) – Chicago (Polish)
- El Conquistador – Geneva (Spanish and English)
- Hlas Národa (The Voice of the Nation) – Chicago
- Naród Polski – Chicago
- Naujienos (socialist newspaper) (Lithuanian Daily News) – Chicago
- Nedelni Hlasatel (formerly Denni Hlasatel) – Berwyn
- Sonntagpost und Milwaukee deutsche Zeitung – Chicago
- Svenska Amerikanaren Tribunen – Chicago
- Ukrainske Slovo Newspaper (Hoffman Estates) - Est 2002 – Ukrainian
- Vachakam Prevalent Malayali Newspaper (Naperville) - Est 2020 – South Indian
- Zgoda (Harmony) – Chicago

== University and college newspapers ==
- The Bradley Scout – Bradley University
- The Chicago Maroon – University of Chicago
- The Columbia Chronicle – Columbia College Chicago
- The Daily Eastern News – Eastern Illinois University
- The Daily Egyptian – Southern Illinois University Carbondale
- The Daily Illini – University of Illinois at Urbana–Champaign
- The Daily Northwestern – Northwestern University
- The DePaulia – DePaul University
- ICC Harbinger – Illinois Central College
- The Lewis Flyer – Lewis University
- Loyola Phoenix – Loyola University Chicago
- The McKendree Review – McKendree University
- Northern Star – Northern Illinois University
- The Stentor – Lake Forest College
- The Vidette – Illinois State University
- The Western Courier – Western Illinois University

== Newspapers no longer published in Illinois ==
- Draugas (The Friend) – formerly published in Chicago (Lithuanian language)

== Defunct newspapers ==
- Abendpost und Milwaukee deutsche Zeitung – Chicago (German language)
- Arbeiter-Zeitung (1837–1931) – Chicago (German language)
- Assyrian Guardian – Chicago
- Champaign-Urbana Courier
- Chicago Daily News (1875–1978)
- The Chicago Day Book (1911–1917)
- Chicago Democrat (1857)
- Chicago Evening Post
- Chicago Inter Ocean
- Chicago Jewish Star (1991–2018) – Skokie
- Chicago Press and Tribune (1857)
- Chicago's American (1900-1939)
- Chicago Times
- Chicago Whip (1919–1939)
- Commercial Bulletin (Troy)
- Congregational Herald (Chicago) (1857)
- Dahlgren Echo (1899–?) – Dahlgren
- Daily Commercial Bulletin (Chicago)
- Daily Journal (Wheaton, Illinois) (1933–1992) – Wheaton
- Daily Worker (Chicago)
- East St. Louis Monitor (1963 to 2024)
- The Herald/Country Market – Bourbonnais
- Decatur Daily Review (Review Pub. Co., pub.; 1891−1917) – Decatur
  - succeeded by? Decatur Daily Review (1919−1980) – Decatur
  - Daily Republican (Hamsher & Calhoun, pub.; 1894−1899) – Decatur
    - Decatur Daily Republican (Hamsher & Mosser, pub.; 1875−1894) – Decatur
      - The Daily Republican (Hamsher & Mosser, pub.; 1872−1875) – Decatur
        - Daily Decatur Republican (Hamsher & Mosser, pub.; 1867−1872) – Decatur
    - Morning Review (Review Pub. Co., pub.; 1888−1891) – Decatur
      - The Daily Review (W. J. Mize & Col., pub.; 1886−1888) – Decatur
        - Morning Review (Jack & Mize, pub.; 1884−1886) – Decatur
          - The Decatur Morning Review (Jack & Mize, pub.; 1883−1884) – Decatur
            - The Morning Review (S. S. Jack, pub.; 1881−1883) – Decatur
              - Decatur Daily Review (Wm. H. Bayne, pub.; 18??−1881) – Decatur
                - The Decatur Local Review (Alfred Wuensch, pub.; 1873−18??) – Decatur
- Decatur Weekly Republican (Hamsher & Mosser, pub.; 1877−1898) – Decatur
  - The Decatur Republican (Stanley & Mosser, pub; 1867−1877) – Decatur
- The Evening Bulletin (John Lindsay & Co., pub.; 18??−1???) – Decatur
  - Labor Bulletin (John Lindsay & Co., pub.; 1886−18??) – Decatur
    - Daily Labor Bulletin (John Lindsay & Co., pub.; 1885−1886) – Decatur
- Dziennik Narodowy (Chicago) (1899–1923)
- Jewish Sentinel Or The Sentinel (1911-1996)
- The Express – Tallula
- Free West
- Idisher ḳuryer: The Daily Jewish Courier (Chicago) (1887-194?)
- Metro-East Journal (East St. Louis)
- The Northwestern Lumberman, Chicago
- Naujienos (socialist newspaper) – Chicago
- Pochodeň (Chicago) (1896–1899)
- Post Amerikan (Bloomington-Normal)
- Skandinaven (1866–1941) – Chicago (Norwegian Language)
- South County News – Gillespie
- Springfield Republican-American
- Telegraf (Chicago) (1892-19??)
- The Union Signal (1883-2016) - Chicago, Evanston
- The Voice of the Black Community (The Voice, pub.; 1968−1993) – Decatur
- Weekly Thursday News (Michael Lakin, pub.; 1997−1997) – Mt. Pulaski
  - Weekly News (Michael Lakin, pub.; 1989−1997) – Mt. Pulaski
    - Mount Pulaski Weekly News (Weekly News, pub.; 1988−1988) – Mt. Pulaski
      - Hometown Weekly News (Michael Lakin, pub.; 1988−1988) – Mt. Pulaski
        - Independent Free Press (Michael Lakin, pub.; 1988−1988) – Mt. Pulaski
          - Weekly Merchant (1987−1987) – Mt. Pulaski
      - Times News (Harry J. Wible, pub.; 1961−1988) – Mt. Pulaski
        - Mt. Pulaski Times-News (Harry J. Wible, pub.; 1932−1961) – Mt. Pulaski
          - Mt. Pulaski Times (Smedley & Hansel, pub.; 190?−1932) – Mt. Pulaski
          - Mt. Pulaski Weekly News (S. Linn Reidler, pub.; 18??−1932) – Mt. Pulaski
    - The Prairie Post (Bob Wilson, pub.; 1958−1989) – Maroa
      - The Argenta Register (G. Huntoon, pub.; 1917−1958) – Argenta
- Vorbote (Chicago) (1874–1924)
- Western Citizen (Chicago) (1850s)

== See also ==
- Illinois Newspaper Project
- Newspapers of the Chicago metropolitan area

Comprehensive

- Lists of newspapers
- List of newspapers in the United States

Frequency

- List of free daily newspapers in the United States
- List of weekly newspapers in the United States

Circulation

- List of international newspapers originating in the United States
- List of national newspapers in the United States
- List of newspapers in the United States by circulation

Foreign language

- List of French-language newspapers published in the United States
- List of German-language newspapers published in the United States
- List of Spanish-language newspapers published in the United States

Specialty

- List of African-American newspapers in the United States
- List of alternative weekly newspapers in the United States
- List of business newspapers in the United States
- List of family-owned newspapers in the United States
- List of Jewish newspapers in the United States
- List of LGBTQ periodicals in the United States
- List of student newspapers in the United States
- List of supermarket tabloids in the United States
- List of underground press in the United States

Other

- List of defunct newspapers of the United States
