= Courtright =

Courtright is a surname. Notable people with the surname include:

- Jennie Lee Courtright (1848–1925), American actress of the silent era
- Jim Courtright (gunman) (1848–1887), American lawman, outlaw and gunfighter
- Jim Courtright (athlete) (1914–2003), Canadian track and field athlete, Vice Principal of Queen's University
- John Courtright (born 1970), American former Major League Baseball pitcher
- Marguerite Courtright Patton (1889–1971, American civic leader and anti-communist
- Morris Courtright (1930–2010), American politician
- Nick Courtright (born 1981), American poet
- Ray Courtright (1891–1979), American football and baseball player and college coach of football, basketball, golf, and wrestling
- William Courtright (1848–1933), American film actor
- Milton Courtright Elliott (1879–1928), American lawyer and judge from Norfolk, Virginia

== See also ==
- Courtright, Ontario, township in southwestern Ontario, Canada
- Courtright Reservoir, reservoir in Fresno County, California
- Luke Short – Jim Courtright duel, duel in Fort Worth, Texas, United States, in 1887 between two well known gunmen
- Cortright (disambiguation)
- Cutright (disambiguation)
