= Suburban Life =

Suburban Life may refer to:

- Suburban Life (magazine), an American lifestyle magazine published from 1904 to 1917
- Suburban Life Media, an American publisher of newspapers in the suburbs of Chicago
