= WLRA =

Radio station licensed to Lewis University, Lockport, Illinois

- Lockport, Illinois; United States
- Broadcast area: Lockport, Joliet, Romeoville
- Frequency: 88.1 MHz
- Branding: The Start!

Programming
- Format: Variety
- Affiliations: CNN Newsource

Ownership
- Owner: Lewis University; (College of Humanities, Fine Arts, and Communications)

History
- First air date: 1973
- Former call signs: WFJL 93.1 FM, WLCL 600 AM, WERA 590 AM
- Call sign meaning: Lewis Radio

Technical information
- Licensing authority: FCC
- Facility ID: 37190
- Class: A
- ERP: 140 watts effective radiated power
- HAAT: 40 meters (130 ft)
- Transmitter coordinates: 41°36′10.00″N 88°4′49.00″W

Links
- Public license information: Public file; LMS
- Webcast: Listen live
- Website: www.wlraradio.com

WLRA (88.1 FM) or sometimes called WLRA Radio, or WLRA-FM, is a college radio station broadcasting a variety format. Licensed to Lockport, Illinois, USA, the station serves the Greater Joliet region. The station is licensed to and owned by Lewis University. Lewis University is a private Roman Catholic and Lasallian university with an enrollment of around 6,800 students. The station is a member of the National Association of Broadcasters, Illinois Broadcasters Association, and Broadcast Education Association.

== Lewis University's radio station history ==
- WFJL – (W – FJL – Frank J. Lewis) (93.1 FM Chicago) went on the air on May 22, 1949. WFJL is operated as a non-commercial station by Lewis College of Science and Technology (the previous name of Lewis College, now Lewis University). The station's license was cancelled in 1956. WFJL, under the leadership of Roman Catholic Auxiliary Bishop Most Rev. Bernard J. Sheil, D.D., of the Archdiocese of Chicago and General Manager Jerry Keefe, radio format consisted of religious, educational, news, talk, and CYO Boxing. WFJL's facilities were located at the Lincoln Tower Building, 75 East Wacker Drive, Chicago, 600 feet (180 m) above the ground and had an ERP of 29,000 watts.
- WLCL-AM – (W – LCL – Lewis College Lockport) AM carrier current radio station on Lewis College, Lockport, Illinois campus. Located in the Sheil Hall dormitory basement from its inception until 1970, the station broadcast on 600 kHz to Sheil, Fitzpatrick, and Founders Halls. Robert Feustal and Norb Bora are credited with the inception of WLCL-AM and introducing college radio at Lewis. In 1969, the Sheil Hall basement facility was upgraded with new QRK professional turntables replacing the old Garrard consumer models. A used Gates Sta-Level compressor was installed, giving the station a much more professional technical sound. News, weather, and sports information now came to the station via a United Press International teletype machine. A direct feed to the PA system in the Lewis cafeteria was also added.
- WERA-AM – picked up where WLCL left off in the Fall of 1970. It was at this time that the merger with the College of St. Francis in Joliet was announced (the combined school would be called Lewis-St. Francis of Illinois) and the campus radio station at Lewis (the "North Campus") would now serve the two dorms at the "South Campus" (CSF) as well. A direct feed was installed in the newly remodeled Student Union. A second studio was constructed for production use with the turntables and mixer module able to be easily removed for "remote" broadcast origination from anywhere on the "twin campuses." Most of the carpentry work during the upgrade was done by Station Manager Dennis Stork and the studio wiring was done by Mike Berlak. One very late night, while station staffers discussed plans for the new incarnation of the station (around a table at the Pure Oil truckstop on 55), they noticed a dry cleaners' van in the parking lot with the name "New Era" on it. It was a "new era" for both the college and the campus radio station...and that was the inspiration for the new call letters, WERA. At that time, the station also changed the transmitter frequency to 590 kHz. At the start of the Fall 1971 semester, the station conducted its biggest promotional push, "weraweek!" Highlights included the WERA YesterHop (a live broadcast/50s style "sock hop" in the Union) and a flight of the WERA Beer Bomber (a live broadcast from an airplane over the campus which dropped certificates good for six-packs to the assembled multitudes below.) During the 1971–72 school year, General Manager Mike Berlak began the process of applying for an FCC FM license, which would allow over-the-air broadcasts. In anticipation of this expansion, a completely new broadcast facility was built in the former Fitz Hall Lounge area, opening in the Spring of 1972.
- WLRA-FM – (W – LRA – Lewis RAdio) went on the air March 4, 1973, on 88.1 in mono with 250 watts of effective radiated power at 90 feet (27 m) HAAT. WLRA is licensed as a non-commercial educational radio station. In 1976 WLRA added stereo. Lewis University was annexed from unincorporated Lockport Township into Romeoville, Illinois, though WLRA continues to be licensed to Lockport due to its stronger signal in and closer proximity to its city center.

== Programming ==
As with most colleges, WLRA included the music industry, and the musical tastes of the station's staff and the listening audience change over time. The college's radio station has the obligation to meet these challenges. As Cardinal John Henry Newman wrote: "to live is to change... and to be perfect is to have changed often". College radio stations pride themselves on promoting underplayed and under-represented forms of music, the obscure and unique – versus the mainstream. The college radio stations achieve this with independent music labels and the College Media JournalCMJ Online.

WLRA Radio's diverse programming reflects a traditional college radio format known as variety presented in block style (2–4 hour show).

WLRA Radio has hosted many innovative radio programs over the years. These include eclectic and Freeform, experimental college radio programming, weekly live radio talk shows, Lewis University Flyer sporting events from around the country, remote broadcasts, and community service events.

WLRA's current programming includes news and sports talk radio, coverage of Lewis University Flyer Sports, local high school football and basketball; music genre formats including adult album alternative, alternative rock, hip hop, rap, rock and roll, blues, jazz, reggae, religious, country, seasonal Christmas music, and Latina-American cultural immersion.

In the Fall 2008 semester, WLRA staffed 24 hours with students on air. The station also introduced a Trop Rock format called "The Island" which features calypso, reggae, and Caribbean rock music.

WLRA has broadcast many radio remotes from as far away as Florida to cover Lewis University Flyer Baseball, Las Vegas to broadcast "The Practice Squad" sports talk show; and also, the National Association of Broadcasters Convention at the Comrex booth. The radio station has also broadcast from The House of Blues in Chicago, LaLaPalooza, Jimmy Buffett pre-concert, Ditka's Restaurant in Chicago, and ESPN Zone in Chicago.

WLRA, with a commitment to community service, has produced marathon broadcasts for a local children's hospital and Christmas music programming with the United Way of Will County. In March 2011, broadcasting student Jodi Steinberg set a WLRA broadcasting record with a 76-hour non-stop on-air marathon during "To Kill A DJ".

== Specialty radio shows ==
"The Island" features calypso, reggae, and Caribbean rock music (Friday Midnight – Sunday 3am)
"Route 53 Country" features country music (Sunday 6 am-6 pm)
"Friday Night Lights" features local high school football games from the Joliet region (weekly – Friday 6pm-10pm)
"United Way of Will County's Christmas Memories for you and your Family" features religious and secular Christmas music (Thanksgiving until January, 24 hours a day)

== Technical achievements ==
Lewis University's WLRA Radio was the first college radio station in the country to become digital. Lewis University received a $350,000 digital broadcasting project grant in the 1990s from the philanthropy of The Andrew Corporation, a leading worldwide communications corporation. The studios, music archives, music scheduling system, audio storage and retrieval systems (including an AES/EBU Broadcast Electronics – Audiovault serial number 001 and 002), digital audio consoles, CD players & recorders, minidisc players and recorders, and DAT), ISDN digital phone system, ISDN and IP remote broadcast codecs, Optimod 8700 AES/EBU audio processing, AES/EBU broadcast delay, Harris Digit AES/EBU FM exciter, and transmitters were upgraded from analog to digital AES3 type I balanced and type II optical. The entire digital project was a joint venture with the Freberg Communications Corporation of Illinois, Harris Corporation of Florida, Pacific Research and Engineering of California, A-Ware Corporation (Musicmaster) of Wisconsin, and Broadcast Electronics Corporation of Illinois. WLRA also added RDS Radio Data System to the FM transmission allowing information about the artist and song to be displayed on a radio tuned to 88.1 FM. Lewis University installed a new self-standing 250-foot (76 m) radio tower and new digital IBOC or HD Radio ready ERI Rototiler Broadcast Solutions™, Antennas, Towers – Electronics Research Inc | Chandler, IN single bay fm antenna in 2000 adjacent to DeLaSalle Hall. WLRA increased the antenna height to 200 feet (61 m) HAAT and had to reduce the effective radiated power to 140 watts. WLRA moved from the basement of the Fitzpatrick Hall dormitory basement to the new studios and broadcasting center in December 2005. The new broadcasting facility was named the Andrew Center of Electronic Media at Lewis University. The broadcasting studios and transmitters are located in DeLaSalle Hall on the Lewis University Romeoville campus. In 2005 WLRA began streaming a simulcast of the station over the Internet and in 2008 mobile media apps for the Apple iPhone and iPod Touch. Simultaneously Apple added WLRA as one of their iTunes Radio Stations under the College format. WLRA uses an AES3 Orban Opticodec audio processing/encoder for their 128kbs and 64kbs bit streams. In 2010, WLRA and Broadcast Electronics, Inc. integrated social media automation and Twitter with the newest generation of Broadcast Electronics AudioVault (FLEX) and Message Manager (TRE) RBDS data. The automation allows listeners to be notified of their favorite artists being played through tagging. WLRA was the first station to have Broadcast Electronics integrate customer-supplied computers, paving the way for other stations to upgrade to new-generation Audiovault FLEX. In the Spring of 2012, WLRA was among the first 15 colleges selected to be part of Clear Channel Communication's iHeartRadio for both internet streaming and mobile media apps.

== WLRA's memberships ==
- NAB (National Association of Broadcasters)NAB: The Voice for America's Radio and TV Broadcasters member station
- ILBA (Illinois Broadcaster's Association) Illinois Broadcasters Association
- BEA (Broadcast Education Association) BEA – The Broadcast Education Association | Educating Tomorrow's Media

== See also ==
- Campus radio
- List of college radio stations in the United States
