= Laura Myntti =

American artist (born 1962)

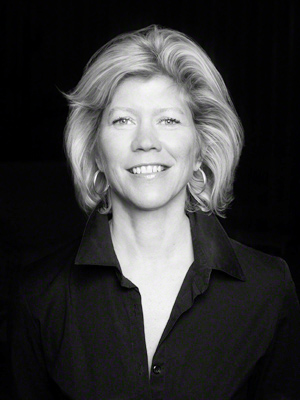
- Laura Myntti
- Born: Laura Jane Myntti; 1962 (age 63–64); Minnesota
- Education: University of Idaho
- Known for: Painting, etching, drawing, found objects, mosaics, photo collage
- Website: myntti.com

Laura Myntti (born 1962) is an American artist known for her paintings, etchings, and in situ drawings; she also works with found objects, mosaics, and photo collage.

== Background ==
Laura Myntti graduated from the University of Idaho with a Bachelor of Fine Arts degree in 1984

== Career ==
Myntti has appeared in articles written in the Fairbanks Daily News Miner, Oak Park Journal, and Anchorage Daily News. The Oak Park Journal noted that "Ms. Myntti's work is inspired by the daily experiences of life, including interpersonal relationships, family and marriage. She often uses vivid, expressive colors in her paintings." The Spokesman-Review described the colors and simplified forms in her paintings as being "reminiscent of the early 20th-century Fauve movement". Jan Ingram in the Anchorage Daily News of January 30, 1994 wrote "These paintings are experimental and fun". Two years later in the same newspaper Lianne Williamson wrote about her exhibited works at the Nordic Heritage Museum. Eric Swenson in the Anchorage Daily News wrote that "humor is one of Myntti's many strengths.

=== Catalogs ===
- Douglas Davis, Laura Myntti Nordic Heritage Museum, Seattle, 1997.
- Ivan Esteban Casteneda. The Efficacy of Representation: The Work of Laura Myntti Prichard Art Gallery, 2002, University Of Idaho.
