= Jack Ryan (politician) =

American investment banker and politician (born 1959)

- Born: John Clemens Ryan; October 6, 1959 (age 67); Wilmette, Illinois, U.S.
- Education: Dartmouth College (BA); Harvard University (JD, MBA)
- Political party: Republican
- Spouses: Jeri Zimmerman (m. 1991; div. 1999) Amanda Klingman (m. 2008)
- Children: 1

John Clemens Ryan (born October 6, 1959) is an American businessman, former investment banker and politician who was a candidate in the 2004 United States Senate election in Illinois. In 2000, he retired as an active partner at Goldman Sachs to teach at Hales Franciscan High School, a private Catholic high school in Chicago's Bronzeville neighborhood.

His 2004 campaign for the Senate, against Barack Obama, received widespread media attention for the disclosure of sealed custody documents stemming from his divorce from actress Jeri Ryan. The unsealing of those documents detailed allegations that Ryan wanted his wife to perform sexual acts in public which in turn led to Ryan's withdrawal from the campaign.

In March 2005, Ryan launched 22nd Century Media, a news media company dedicated to providing hyper-local news in both print and digital media formats. In 2015, Ryan left 22nd Century Media to launch REX, a technology-based real estate services company that works outside the MLS to sell homes.

== Early life ==
Ryan spent his childhood in Wilmette, Illinois, the son of Helen Marie (Bruns) and Donald Robert Ryan, a managing partner at a trade and clearing house. One of six siblings, he attended New Trier High School. He graduated from high school in 1977 and went on to earn his Bachelor degree from Dartmouth College, and his JD and MBA from Harvard University.

== Career ==
Ryan worked at Casa Juan Diego, a refugee camp for Latinos fleeing the Central American civil wars in 1981. He worked for Goldman Sachs as an investment banker and eventual partner, first in New York City, and then in the Chicago branch. During his tenure there he took on a client acquisition role, contacting prominent CEOs about hiring his firm to examine the internal numbers of a company's business, subsidiaries, and divisions down to the most minute detail.

In 2000, after Goldman Sachs went public, Ryan's net worth was in the tens of millions. He retired from Goldman as a partner and taught for three years at Hales Franciscan High School in Chicago. He left his teaching position to run for the Senate in 2004.

=== 22nd Century Media ===
Starting in 2005, he ran 22nd Century Media, which published 15 separate localized newspapers and websites in the Chicago area. Following his political career, Ryan resumed his newspaper business. On February 27, 2014, he launched the Highland Park Landmark, the 12th hyper-local news publication published by his company, 22nd Century Media, and the fifth hyper-local product to serve Chicago's North Shore suburbs. When asked why he chose to enter the news media industry, Ryan told the Chicago Reader, "I was committed to improving the communities in which we live, and our profession seemed like a very good way to do so." Ryan also related that while at Goldman Sachs, he had observed how large retailer chains lost business to "category killers" whose specialization in specific products allowed them dominate those markets, as Best Buy and Toys R Us, for example, did with electronics and toys, respectively. Feeling that a similar process would take place with the various sections of traditional newspapers, Ryan believed that he was suited for work in local journalism. He believed that the way the media handled the scandal that ended his political career showed that there were ways in which that profession could be improved.

=== REX ===
He runs REX, a technology-based real estate services company that works outside the MLS to sell homes. At its launch in 2015 it advertised transaction commissions of 1% instead of the 6% industry standard.

In 2021, REX filed an antitrust lawsuit against Zillow, Trulia, and the National Association of Realtors seeking monetary damages and injunctive relief for alleged anti-competitive practices.

== 2004 U.S. Senate race ==
Ryan hoped to succeed retiring Republican Peter Fitzgerald in the United States Senate. On March 16, 2004, he won the Republican primary, pitting him against Democrat Barack Obama. However, after his divorce records containing damaging allegations were unsealed and made public, he announced his decision to withdraw his candidacy on June 25, 2004, and officially filed the documentation to do so on July 29. During his Senate campaign, Ryan supported across-the-board tax cuts, tort reform, and reductions in federal spending, and was a proponent of equal opportunity in education.

In 2004, Ryan's staff had Justin Warfel (a campaign worker) follow Barack Obama throughout the day and record everything he did in public on videotape. The tactic backfired when Barack Obama and others, including Ryan's supporters, criticized this activity. Ryan's spokesman apologized and promised that Warfel would give Obama more space. Obama said he was satisfied with Ryan's decision.

=== Campaign demise ===
Ryan married actress Jeri Ryan (née Zimmerman) in 1991; together they have a son, Alex Ryan, born 1994. They divorced in 1999 in California, and the records of the divorce were open but their custody documents were sealed at their joint request. Five years later, when Ryan's Senate campaign began, the Chicago Tribune newspaper and WLS-TV, the local ABC affiliate, sought to have the records released. On March 3, 2004, several of Ryan's GOP primary opponents urged release of the records. Both Ryan and his wife had agreed to make their divorce records public but keep the custody records sealed, claiming that their release could be harmful to their son. On March 16, 2004, Ryan won the GOP primary with 36 percent to 23 percent against businessman and perennial political candidate Jim Oberweis, who came in second. Obama won the Democratic primary, with 53 percent to 23 percent against Dan Hynes, who came in second.

On March 29, 2004, Los Angeles Superior Court Judge Robert Schnider ruled that several of the Ryans' custody records should be opened to the public despite the parties' mutual agreement to keep the records sealed. The following week, on April 2, 2004, Barack Obama called on Democrats not to inject them into the campaign. The Ryan campaign characterized Obama's stance as hypocritical because people they alleged to be Obama's backers had been emailing reports about the divorce records before Judge Schnider's decision and urging the press to seek to open them.

In May 2004, a Chicago Tribune poll found Ryan trailing Obama 52% to 30%. On June 22, 2004, after receiving a report from the referee, Judge Schnider released the files that were deemed consistent with the interests of Ryan's young child. In those files, Jeri Ryan alleged that Jack Ryan had wanted her to perform sexual acts with him in public in sex clubs in New York City, New Orleans, and Paris, but no sex occurred. Jeri Ryan described one as "a bizarre club with cages, whips and other apparatus hanging from the ceiling". The decision to release these files generated much controversy because it went against both parents' direct request, and because it reversed the earlier decision to seal the papers in the best interest of the child, who had special needs. On the same day, Jim Oberweis, Ryan's defeated opponent in the GOP primary, commented that if the allegations were true, "it would end the candidacy."

Ryan's campaign indeed ended less than a week after the custody records were opened, and Ryan officially filed the documentation to withdraw on July 29, 2004. The same party leaders who called for Ryan's resignation chose Alan Keyes as Ryan's replacement in the race; Keyes lost to Obama, 27% to 70%.

=== Ryan's response ===
Subsequent to his withdrawal from the U.S. Senate race in Illinois, Jack Ryan has characterized what happened to him as a "new low for politics in America". According to Ryan, it was unprecedented in American politics for a newspaper to sue for access to sealed custody documents. Ryan opposed unsealing the divorce records of Senator John Kerry during Kerry's race against George W. Bush in 2004, and Kerry's divorce records remained sealed. Ryan subsequently made a statement requesting "Let me be the only person this has happened to. Don't ask for Ted Kennedy's. Don't ask for John McCain's. Don't ask for Joe Lieberman's. Just stop. This is not a good precedent for American society if you really want the best and brightest to run."

Party political offices
Preceded by Peter Fitzgerald	Republican nominee for U.S. Senator from Illinois (Class 3); Withdrew; 2004	Succeeded by Alan Keyes
