= Fitzpatrick House (Romeoville, Illinois) =

Historic house in Illinois, United States

- U.S. National Register of Historic Places
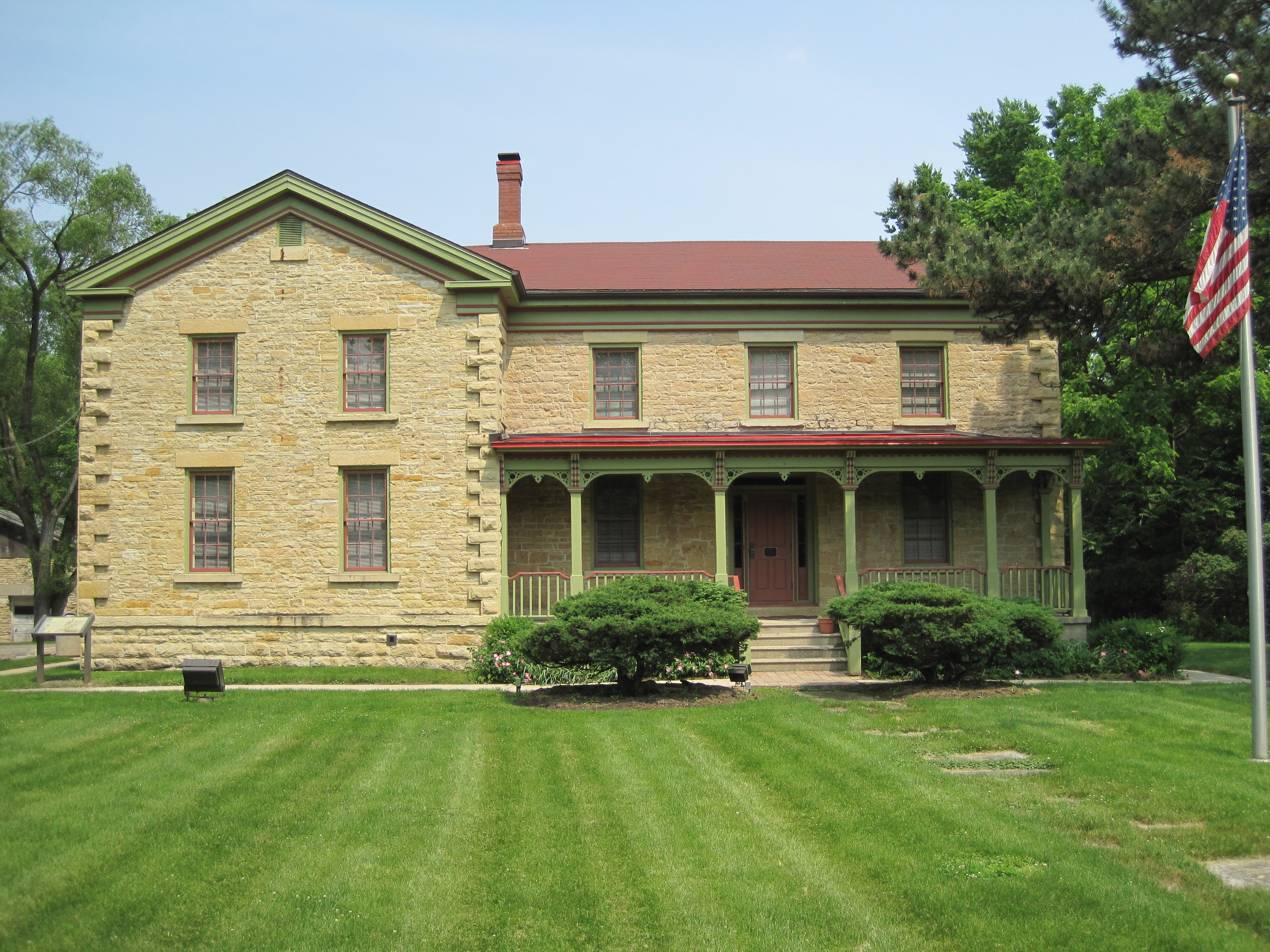
- The Fitzpatrick House in 2011

- Location within Illinois Location within the United States
- Interactive map showing the location of Fitzpatrick House
- Location: Illinois Route 53; Romeoville, Lockport Township, Will County, Illinois, U.S.
- Coordinates: 41°36′2″N 88°4′15″W
- Built: c. 1842
- Architectural style: Vernacular
- NRHP reference No.: 84001170
- Added to NRHP: February 9, 1984

The Fitzpatrick House is a historic residence in Romeoville, Lockport Township, Illinois.

== History ==
Patrick Fitzpatrick immigrated from Canada in 1833-1834 and was one of Lockport's first settlers. Fitzpatrick purchased the 160-acre (65 ha) lot shortly after he arrived and constructed a farm. He eventually increased the size of his farm to 1,200 acres (490 ha) and became a prominent citizen. Irish immigrants flocked to the region in the mid to late 1830s during the construction of the Illinois and Michigan Canal. Fitzpatrick, who spent his childhood in Ireland, became an important figure in the local Irish community, having already reached a level of economic success before construction of the canal started. The limestone house was constructed along the Chicago–Ottawa stagecoach road, which later became Illinois Route 53.

Fitzpatrick's heirs donated portions of the farmstead to the Roman Catholic Archdiocese of Chicago, which was used for Lewis University. The last descendant of the Fitzpatrick family died in 1950. The house was added to the National Register of Historic Places in 1984. The home was acquired by Lewis University in 2001 and is currently used as an alumni affairs office.

== Architecture ==
The Fitzpatrick House is a T-shaped stone house with Greek Revival details. The two sections of the T are each approximately 25 by 35 feet (7.6 m × 10.7 m). The gable ends have two bays and the long section has three bays. The interior has been completely remodeled and has no historic integrity. The south (long) section may have been built first. This side has the front door, centered in the middle bay facing west toward Illinois 53. Typical of Greek Revival houses, the Fitzpatrick House has flat stone lintels, symmetrical proportions, and a horizontal transom. The property also has a 28-by-37-foot (8.5 m × 11.3 m) barn.
