= 1984 Romeoville petroleum refinery disaster =

Explosion and fire in Illinois, US

Coordinates: 41°38′45″N 88°3′10″W

- Date: July 23, 1984; 42 years ago
- Location: Romeoville, Illinois, U.S.
- Type: Boiling liquid expanding vapor explosion (BLEVE)
- Deaths: 17

On July 23, 1984, an explosion and fire took place at a Union Oil Lemont Refinery in Romeoville, Illinois, outside Chicago, killing 17 people and causing major property damage. The explosive force propelled the upper portion 14 metres (46 ft) of the vessel a distance of 1 kilometre (0.62 mi) from its original location, while the base remained at the center of the resultant fire.

== Structure ==
The tower was constructed from 25 millimetres (0.98 in) thick plates of type ASTM A516 Grade 70 steel per ASME Section VIII pressure vessel code. The vessel was 18.8 metres (62 ft) tall, 2.6 metres (8.5 ft) in diameter.

== History ==
Beginning in 1970 the vessel served as an amine absorber tower, used to strip hydrogen sulfide from a process stream of propane and butane. In 1974, plant inspection identified hydrogen blisters and laminations in the shell of the vessel, and the refinery replaced several meters of the lower shell section using manual metal arc welding. After welding, no post weld heat treatment (PWHT) was performed. PWHT is a vital process that reduces residual stresses formed during welding, and restores the macro structure of the steel.

«Lemont Refinery»

In 1976, a Monel liner was installed on the bottom head to reduce corrosion. The shell section replaced in 1974 was not covered by this new liner.

Shortly before 6 pm that day, a worker making a routine hourly check of the tower discovered a hairline crack in a horizontal circular weld. The operator attempted to close the main inlet valve to the tower to stop gas leaking from the 150 millimetres (5.9 in) crack. The crack grew to 600 millimetres (24 in) and the operator initiated an evacuation. The crack continued to grow and a significant quantity of flammable gas was released as company fire fighters gathered at the scene. The gas ignited, killing 17, seriously injuring 10 others, damaging the refinery, and launching the upper portion of the vessel to 1 kilometre (0.62 mi) from its original location.

Failure analysis of the vessel segments included the following non-destructive testing methods.

- Magnetic particle inspection revealed "hundreds" of cracks along the inner surfaces of the horizontal welds at both the top and bottom of the section replaced in 1974.
- Ultrasonic measurements indicated delamination damage below the replaced section.
- Thickness measurements using a micrometer showed that the wall thickness for both sections was well within the allowances for pressure vessels.

The cause of cracking did not become clear until metallographic results were combined with stress corrosion cracking and hydrogen embrittlement tests, followed by fracture mechanics analysis. It appeared that an already existing crack had extended through more than 90% of the wall thickness and was about 800 mm in length. Further, it was determined that hydrogen embrittlement had reduced the fracture resistance of the steel by more than half. The vessel had been put into service in 1970 and had undergone several repairs and modifications before the July 1984 incident. The vessel was fractured along a path that was weakened by extensive cracking adjacent to a repair weld joining a replacement section to the original vessel. These pre-existing cracks initiated in areas of hard microstructure known to be susceptible to hydrogen stress cracking. This hard microstructure formed during the repair welding of the replacement section. The cracks grew through the vessel wall as a result of hydrogen pressure cracking.

== Ruptured vessel ==
When the depth of the largest of these pre-existing cracks exceeded 90% to 95% of the wall thickness, the remaining thin ligament of steel in the cracked section ruptured and leakage occurred. This crack caused a complete fracture of the vessel circumference at the operating stress level of only 35 MPa (roughly 10% of the rated strength of the steel) because the toughness of the vessel steel had been reduced by hydrogen embrittlement.
