= Cutright =

Cutright may refer to:

- Jane Cutright, editor of The Petersburg Observer in Petersburg, Illinois
- Paul Russell Cutright (March 18, 1897 – March 11, 1988), American historian and biologist
- Simon Cutright (b. July 20, 1974), a.k.a. Simon Rex, American actor and rapper.
