= Michael H. Wynn =

American podiatrist (born 1953)

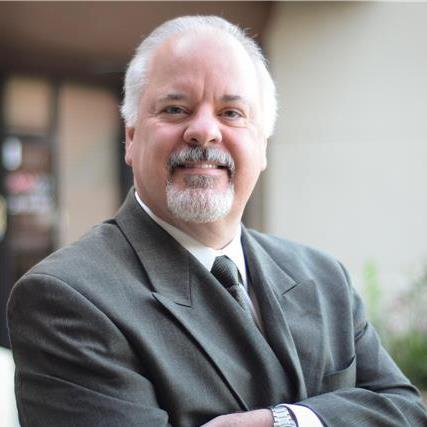
- Dr. Michael H. Wynn, DPM
- Born: October 23, 1953 (age 72); Evergreen, Illinois, Illinois, US
- Education: Lewis University; Ohio College of Podiatric Medicine
- Medical career
- Profession: Podiatrist, lecturer, author
- Institutions: Foot Care Associates of Texas; Kingwood Medical Center
- Research: laser surgery

Michael H. Wynn, D.P.M. (born October 23, 1953) is an American podiatrist practicing in Kingwood, Texas, specializing in surgical application of lasers in the treatment of foot and ankle disorders and carbon dioxide laser treatment of bunions.

== Early life and education ==
Michael Wynn was born on October 23, 1953, in Evergreen, Illinois to Joseph Michael Wynn and Patricia Ann née Buckentin Wynn. In 1967, the family moved to Lockport, Illinois, and he graduated from Lockport High School in 1972. At Lockport, he participated in football, track, and theatre.

Wynn attended nearby Lewis University from 1972 to 1976. He graduated with a BA in Biology & Chemistry. Following graduation, and prior to graduate school, Wynn worked at a subsidiary company of Dr. Scholl's, in Michigan City, Indiana. While there, he served on the Environmental Protection Agency (EPA) board for the city.

Wynn entered the Ohio College of Podiatric Medicine in the fall of 1977, spending most evenings and weekends as a lab tech in Rainbow Baby's and Children's Hospital. He graduated in 1981 with a DPM. Wynn completed his surgical training in Houston, Texas in 1982.

== Career ==
In Houston, the focus of his practice was ankle arthroscopy, and endoscopic, reconstructive, and peripheral nerve surgeries. He concurrently studied and implemented the use of lasers in the treatment of foot and ankle disorders.

=== Laser surgery advances ===
Wynn was a proponent of the use of lasers in foot and ankle surgery, inspired by the work of Isaac Kaplan, considered by many to be the father of laser surgery. He studied Kaplan's research and applied it to foot and ankle surgery pioneering several techniques using the CO_{2} laser. He has written numerous publications on the application for their use, beginning in 1986 with the publication of Soft Tissue Bunion Repair with a CO_{2} Surgical Laser in "The Journal of Current Podiatric Medicine" detailing a surgical laser technique he helped develop.

In 1991, he was a contributor and developer of the CO_{2} Laser WaveGuide Delivery system for arthroscopic surgical treatment of the ankle, preparing it for FDA clearance.

In 1985 and 1986, he served as a lecturer and instructor for the Houston Laser Institute, training physicians across the country. From 1999 through 2001, Wynn was a Medical examiner for the Texas State Board of Podiatry.

He is currently the Clinical Liaison at the Kingwood Medical Center Podiatric Surgical Residency, for the Greater Texas Education Foundation.

== Publications ==
- Nitrous Oxide Induced Myeloneurapathy, 1983, The Journal of Foot Surgery
- Laser as a Light Scalpel, 1987
- Soft Tissue Bunion Repair with a CO_{2} Surgical Laser, 1986
- CO_{2} Surgical Laser Excision of Interdigital Neuroma, 1991
- Malignancy and Pedal Gangrene, 1996, Journal of the American Podiatric Association
- CO_{2} Lasers on Osseous Tissue (chapter in textbook: "Laser Surgery of the Foot"), 1989

== See also ==
- Podiatry
