= The Lewis Flyer =

The Lewis University Flyer Newspaper
- Type: Student newspaper
- Format: Compact
- Owner(s): Lewis University
- Publisher: Lewis University; College of Arts and Sciences
- Founded: 1933
- Headquarters: Romeoville, Illinois, U.S.
- Website: thelewisflyer.com

The Lewis Flyer newspaper is the official student publication of Lewis University. The Lewis Flyer newspaper is owned and published by Lewis University. Lewis University is a private Roman Catholic and Lasallian university with an enrollment around 5,200 students.

As a student publication, The Lewis Flyer newspaper's purpose is to provide a learning laboratory for students to practice journalistic skills in the Lewis University Communication Department Journalism program. The student newspaper is published bi-monthly.

== History ==
The college newspaper was founded in 1933, although it was then called The Propeller. The Propeller was published until 1936, when the publication was discontinued for lack of funds. This lasted until 1947. During World War II the school was being used to train pilots. When a newspaper was published again in 1947, it did not have an official name.

In October 1947, however, the revived paper was named The Shield. This name lasted until 1966. The Shield was named after the founder, Bishop Bernard J. Sheil. The school paper shortened its name to Shield in 1966, and published the paper in a magazine format. In 1969, the newspaper went through another name change, this time calling itself Nexus. This name lasted from 1969 to 1977.

On January 31, 1978, the first volume of The Flyer was published. That name has been in place for the past 38 years.

== Awards ==
- Review Writing (2nd place) – Best of the Midwest College Newspaper Convention 2002
- Newspaper of the Year (honorable mention) - Best of the Midwest College Newspaper Convention 2003
- Sports Writing (2nd place) – Best of the Midwest College Newspaper Convention 2003
- Best of Show (2nd place) – Best of the Midwest College Newspaper Convention 2004
- Editorial Writing (honorable mention) – Best of the Midwest College Newspaper Convention 2004
- Best of Show (Newspaper Excellence) – (2nd place) – National College Media Convention in Kansas City 2005
- Newspaper Adviser of the Year 2005 – Dr. Rey Rosales
- Best of Show (honorable mention) – Best of the Midwest College Newspaper Convention 2005
- Sports Writing (1st place) – Best of the Midwest College Newspaper Convention 2005
- Best of Show (1st place) – Best of the Midwest College Newspaper Convention 2006
- Editorial Writing (honorable mention) – Best of the Midwest College Newspaper Convention 2006
- News Photo (3rd place) – Best of the Midwest College Newspaper Convention 2006
- Review Writing (honorable mention) – Best of the Midwest College Newspaper Convention 2006
- Newspaper General Excellence Award (1st place)– Spring 2006 Associated Collegiate Press 'Best of the Midwest' Conference
- The Pacemaker Award (National Award) – Fall 2007 Online Flyer – Associated College Press
- Best of Show (1st place) – Best of the Midwest College Newspaper Convention 2008
- News Story (10th place) – Best of the Midwest College Newspaper Convention 2008
- Newspaper General Excellence (1st place) – Spring 2008 Associated Collegiate Press 'Best of the Midwest' Conference
- Newspaper General Excellence – Spring 2009 Associated Collegiate Press 'Best of the Midwest' Conference
- Best of Show (1st place) – Best of the Midwest College Newspaper Convention 2009
- Single Page Design (4th place) – Best of the Midwest College Newspaper Convention 2010
- Best of Show (4th place) – Best of the Midwest College Newspaper Convention 2011
- Publication Website (4th place) – Best of the Midwest College Newspaper Convention 2011
- Multimedia Package (1st place) – Best of the Midwest College Newspaper Convention 2011
- Social Media Main Page (2nd place) - College Media Association Best of Collegiate Design 2012
- Feature Page (honorable mention) - College Media Association Best of Collegiate Design 2012
- Best Facebook Page (3rd place) - Apple Awards 2012
- Sports Story (honorable mention) - Best of the Midwest College Newspaper Convention 2012
- Publication Website (9th place) - Best of the Midwest College Newspaper Convention 2012
- Single Page Design (3rd place) - Best of the Midwest College Newspaper Convention 2012
- Website Enrollment Level I - 2012 ACP Best of Show Awards
- Publication Website (1st place) - Best of the Midwest College Newspaper Convention 2013
- Single Page Design (4th place) - Best of the Midwest College Newspaper Convention 2013
- Social Media Main Page (second place) - College Media Association Best of Collegiate Design 2013
- Feature Page (honorable mention) - College Media Association Best of Collegiate Design 2013
- Best Facebook Page (3rd place) - Apple Awards 2013
- Best Homepage (honorable mention) - Apple Awards 2013
- General Excellence Award - ICPA Conference 2013
- News Photo (second place) - ICPA Conference 2013
- Photo Editor in the Non-Daily Newspaper Sports Photo (second place) - ICPA Conference 2013
- Sports Page Design (third place) - ICPA Conference 2013
- Advertisement (honorable mention) - ICPA Conference 2013
- Sports Column (honorable mention) - ICPA Conference 2013
- Overall News Website (1st place) - SSND Contest

== See also ==
- List of student newspapers
