= Hales Franciscan High School =

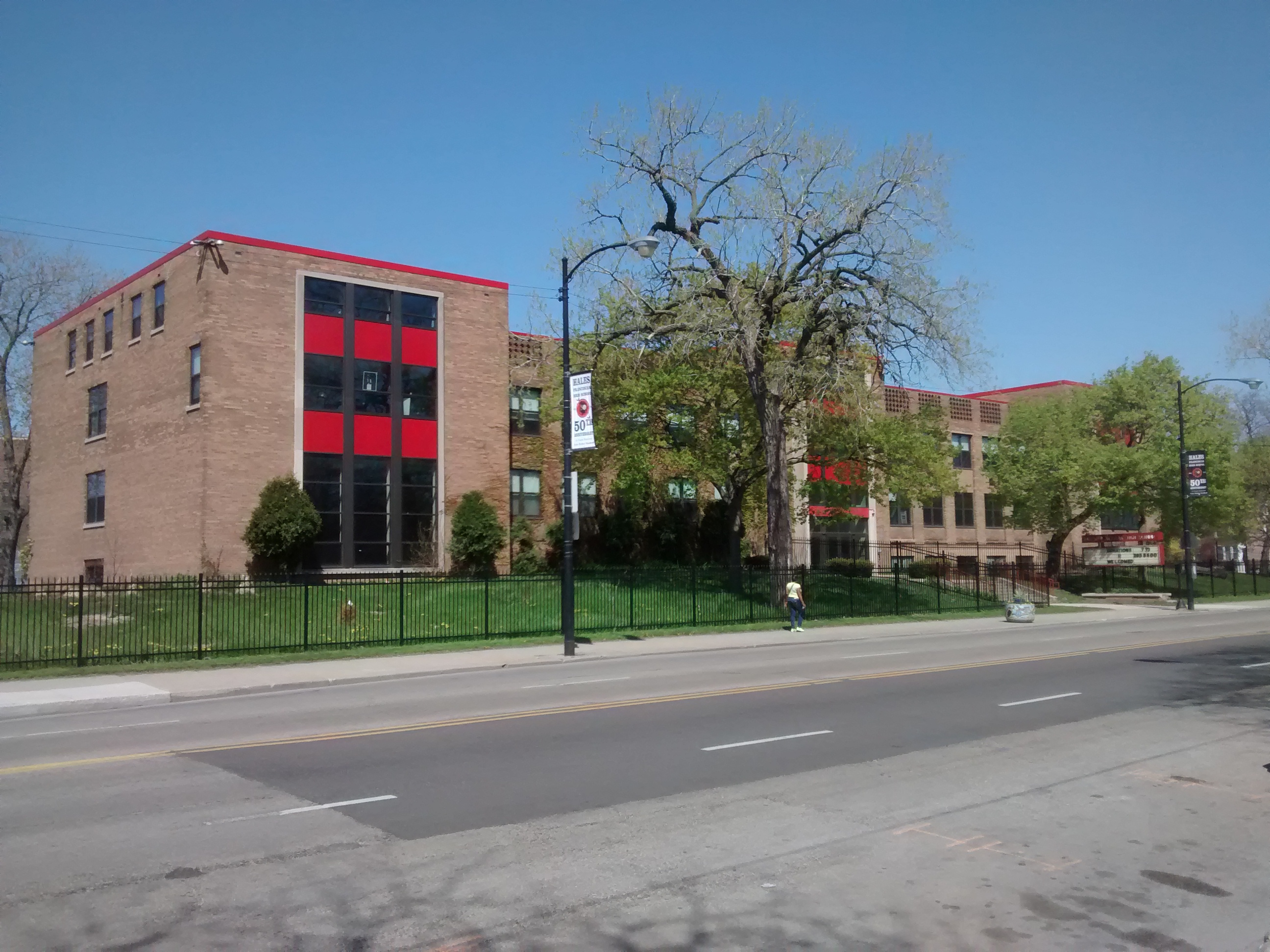

Location
- 4930 S. Cottage Grove Avenue; Chicago, Illinois 60615; United States; 41°48′18″N 87°36′25″W

Information
- Type: Private secondary Catholic
- Motto: In Virum Perfectum (Unto perfect manhood)
- Denomination: Roman Catholic
- Established: 1962
- Closed: 2019
- Oversight: Archdiocese of Chicago
- Grades: 9–12
- Gender: Boys
- Enrollment: 110 (2014–2015)
- Student to teacher ratio: 16:1
- Campus type: Urban
- Colors: Red; Black; White
- Athletics conference: Chicago Catholic League
- Nickname: Spartans
- Accreditation: North Central Association of Colleges and Schools
- Website: halesfranciscan.org

Hales Franciscan High School (known simply as Hales) was a private 4–year all–male catholic high school located in the Bronzeville neighborhood on the south side of Chicago, Illinois. Opened in 1962, Hales was part of the Archdiocese of Chicago. After 57 years, Hales closed after the 2018–2019 school year due to low–enrollment.

== Background ==
Since its founding, Hales Franciscan High School has celebrated African-American heritage and endeavored to instill cultural pride. Today, the school continues to be the only historically African-American, all-male, Catholic college preparatory high school in the state of Illinois and one of three such institutions in the nation.

The school is a non-profit, independent high school, fully accredited by the North Central Association and certified by the Illinois State Board of Education. In the 2013–14 school year, the school became coed, but returned to an all-male student body for the 2015–2016 school year.

On July 27, 2016, the school announced that the 2016–2017 academic school year would be suspended, due to low enrollment and financial struggles. In 2019, the school closed permanently due to declining enrollment and financial struggles.

== Notable alumni ==
- Julius Carry III - 1970, actor
- D. J. Cooper (born 1990) - basketball player in the Israeli Basketball Premier League
- Rich Gardner - 1999, NFL cornerback
- JaVale McGee - 2006, basketball player
- Patrick Miller - 2010, basketball player in the Israeli Basketball Premier League
- Jerome Randle - 2006, professional basketball player

== Notable staff ==
- Jack Ryan (2000–03) - politician. Ryan left the school to run for the open US senate seat in the 2004 election. After winning the Republican primary, his campaign was derailed when court files detailing incidents relating to his sex life with ex-wife Jeri Ryan were unsealed. The election was won by Barack Obama.
