= Edwardsville Intelligencer =

Newspaper for Edwardsville, Illinois

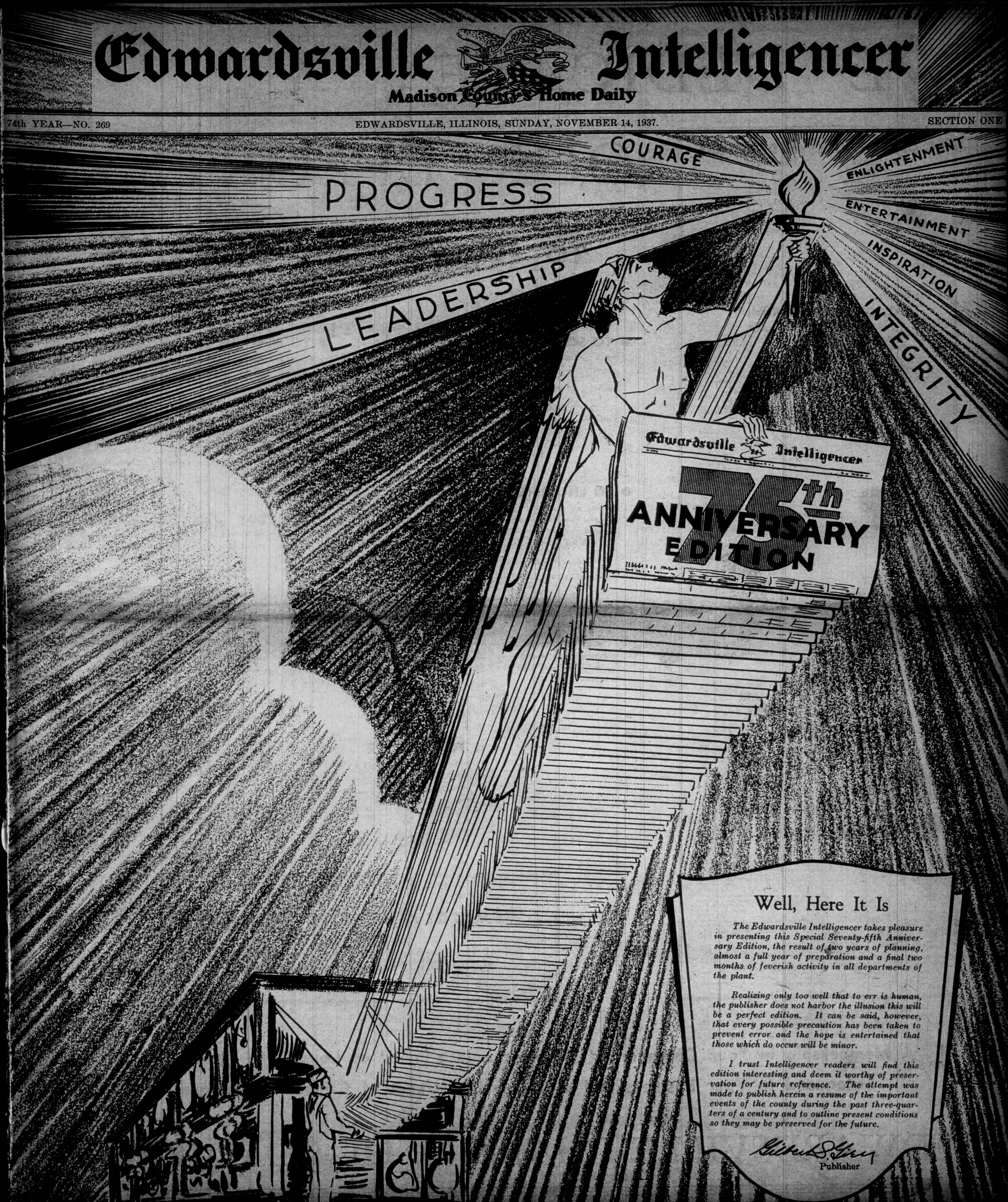
- Front page of the November 14, 1937 issue
- Type: Daily newspaper
- Format: Broadsheet
- Owner: Hearst Corporation
- Publisher: Denise Vonder Haar
- Editor: Penny Weaver
- Founded: 1862
- Headquarters: 116 N. Main St; Edwardsville, IL 62025
- Circulation: 4,010 Daily
- ISSN: 1074-1860
- OCLC number: 12071749
- Website: theintelligencer.com

The Edwardsville Intelligencer is an American daily newspaper in Illinois based in Edwardsville. The paper is circulated in Edwardsville, Glen Carbon, and nearby rural areas.

== History ==
The newspaper was founded as the Madison Intelligencer in 1862; it was a Democratic newspaper. It was published by James R. Brown and Henry C. Barnsback. In 1868, it became the Edwardsville Intelligencer.

A building for the newspaper office was constructed for Charles Boeschenstein near the courthouse at 108 St. Louis Street. In 1923, the paper moved to 117 N Second Street.

On November 14, 1937, the Intelligencer published a special 75th Anniversary edition, which included history of Edwardsville and Madison County. In 1962, the Intelligencer joined the Granite City Press-Record and the Alton Telegraph to publish a sesquicentennial history of Madison County.

In 1960, longtime owner and publisher Gilbert Giese sold it to the owner of the Holyoke Transcript-Telegram. In 1964, the newspaper was purchased by Decatur, Illinois-based Lindsay-Schaub Newspapers. It was acquired by the Hearst Corporation in 1979.

In 2019, the Intelligencer switched from route delivery to US Postal Service delivery. On May 29, 2019, the newspaper office moved to its current headquarters on 116 North Main Street. In 2020, the building on Second Street became a venue called The Ink House with newspaper-themed rooms such as "The Press Room" and "Off the Record".
