= The Unknown Painter =

"The Unknown Painter", subtitled "A Story of Murillo's Pupil", is a short story by an anonymous author that has been claimed falsely to include the first English-language use of the word 'zombi(e)'. (Zombie was spelled without an 'e' until the 1900s). The story is a fable about Murillo's pupil Sebastián Gómez, who according to the story made changes to certain paintings at night. It was printed originally in Chambers's Edinburgh Journal during the 1830s. It was reprinted in 1838 in the Alton Telegraph of Alton, Illinois, and reprinted subsequently, with changes, multiple times in other American newspapers.

In fact the original version of the story did not include the word 'zombi', which seems to have been added in the text and the title in later American reprints. The actual first use of the word "zombi" in English, as recorded in the Oxford English Dictionary, was in 1819, prior to the publication of the story.
