= Cortright =

Cortright is a surname of Flemish origin, an English variation is Cartwright. Notable people with the surname include:

- Elizabeth Monroe Kortright, First lady, wife of President James Monroe 5th President of U.S.
- David Cortright, American peace activist
- Edgar Cortright (1923–2014), American scientist and engineer
- Ion Cortright (1889 - 1961), American football player and coach
- Petra Cortright (b. 1986), American Internet artist
- Richard Cortright (1929 - 2009), American cyclist
- Stephen Cortright (b. 1941), American military officer and attorney

Less commonly, Cortright is used as a given name.

- Cortright McMeel (1971 - 2013), American novelist
