= Lemont Refinery =

Oil refinery in Romeoville, Illinois, United States

- Location within Illinois
- Location: Romeoville, Illinois, United States; 41.64°N 88.058°W

Refinery details
- Operator: CITGO
- Owner: CITGO
- Opened: 1922
- Area: 1,100 acres (450 ha)
- Capacity: 183,000 barrels per day (29,100 m^{3}/d)
- No. of employees: 1,050

Lemont Refinery is an oil refinery in Romeoville, Illinois owned and operated by CITGO Petroleum Corporation. Originally constructed in the early 1920s, it acquired a nearby refinery as Pure Oil and then it significantly expanded the refinery between 1968 through 1970 by its then owner Union Oil. It has a current crude processing capacity of 183,000 barrels per day. The refinery was the site of the 1984 Romeoville petroleum refinery disaster in which 17 people were killed.

The facility includes the following major units: one atmospheric distillation unit, one vacuum distillation unit, one fluid catalytic cracking unit, two catalytic reforming units, one alkylation unit, hydrodesulfurization units, and one coker units.
