= Nick Courtright =

American poet (born 1981)

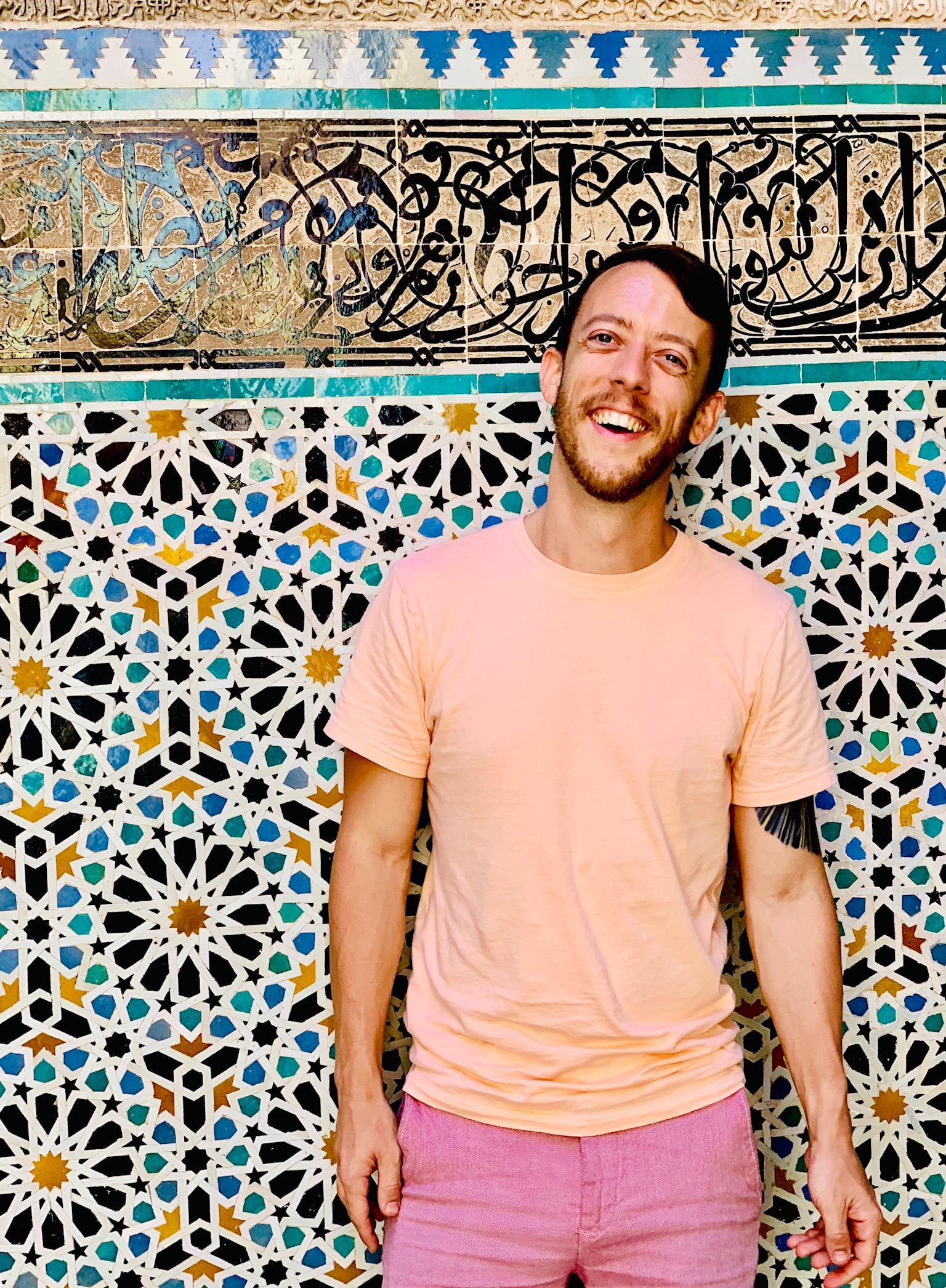
Author photo of Nick Courtright from The Forgotten World, 2021

Nick Courtright (born 1981) is an American poet, scholar, and publisher. He is the author of the book of literary criticism In Perfect Silence at the Stars: Walt Whitman and the Meaning of Poems, and of the poetry collections The Forgotten World, Let There Be Light, Punchline, and the chapbook Elegy for the Builder's Wife. His poetry has appeared in The Southern Review, Boston Review, Massachusetts Review, Kenyon Review Online, Gulf Coast, New Orleans Review, The Literati Quarterly and many others.

He is also the Founder and Executive Editor of Atmosphere Press.

== Life ==
Courtright was born and raised in northeast Ohio. He is the eldest of six children. He received his B.S.S from Ohio University before earning his M.F.A. from the Texas State University MFA program. He earned a PhD from University of Texas at Austin.

== Career ==
=== 2005–2019: Academic Career ===
From 2005 to 2019, Courtright worked as a college educator, teaching English, creative writing, and literature at a range of public and private institutions.

During this time, he also published his early poetry collections and began working in editorial and literary consultancy roles, including time with Gold Wake Press and WriteByNight.

=== 2015–present: Atmosphere Press and Publishing Work ===
In 2015, Courtright founded Atmosphere Press, a hybrid publishing company based in Austin, Texas. By 2025, the press had released over 1,300 titles spanning fiction, nonfiction, poetry, memoir, and children's literature. Courtright manages a team of approximately 40 editors, designers, publicists, and publishing consultants. His responsibilities include editorial supervision, author consultations, and strategic planning.

=== Literary works ===
His first book of poetry, Punchline, was published by Gold Wake Press in 2012; the book was a finalist for the National Poetry Series. The book was inspired by William Blake, Walt Whitman, Federico García Lorca, and Wallace Stevens, as well as the Bhagavad Gita.

He is the author of several poetry collections, including The Forgotten World, Let There Be Light, and Punchline, each of which has received critical acclaim from established poets such as Eduardo C. Corral, Naomi Shihab Nye, and Timothy Donnelly. His most recent publication, In Perfect Silence at the Stars: Walt Whitman and the Meaning of Poems, explores the interpretation of poetry, with praise from poet and critic Donald Revell.

Punchline has been critically praised, with one reviewer citing its "Grand, sweeping themes (mysticism, physics, mythology, cosmology)...crafted into terse lyrics, as if Emily Dickinson had revised Leaves of Grass on her tiny desktop, under an ominous light." Another praised the book's "the-universe-is-expanding soul-searching that's fueled insomniac nights for as long as that universe has had a name." It has also been called a "stunning first collection of poems, invok[ing] the everyday as a point of entry to compelling philosophical questions." Prior to the release of the book, the Best American Poetry website referred to Courtright's work as "vital stuff. This is real, and it’s happening right now."

== Bibliography ==
Poetry

- Chapbook: Elegy for the Builder's Wife (Blue Hour Press, 2010)
- Book: Punchline (Gold Wake Press, 2012)
- Book: Let There Be Light (Gold Wake Press, 2014)
- Book: The Forgotten World (Gold Wake Press, 2021)
- Book: In Perfect Silence: Walt Whitman and the Meaning of Poems (BlazeVox Books, 2023)
