= Cortright McMeel =

American novelist

- Born: Wallace Cortright Wetherill McMeel; May 19, 1971; Boston, Massachusetts, U.S.
- Died: April 19, 2013 (aged 41)
- Education: Johns Hopkins University; Columbia University
- Occupations: Novelist; short story writer; small press publisher
- Spouse: Sharon Zanoni
- Children: 2
- Parent(s): J. Wallace McMeel; Elizabeth Wetherill

Wallace Cortright Wetherill McMeel (May 19, 1971 – April 19, 2013) was an American novelist, short story writer, and small press publisher.

== Early life ==
Wallace Cortright Wetherill McMeel was born May 14, 1971, in Boston, the only child of Elizabeth Wetherill and J. Wallace McMeel. He earned a bachelor's degree from Johns Hopkins University in 1993, and a master's degree from the Creative Writing Program at Columbia University in 1995.

After graduating, he worked as an energy broker and trader with Cargill Inc., first in New York and then in Minnesota. He was at Constellation from 1999 to 2008, and for Rainbow Energy since 2009.

== Writing career ==
Drawing from his experiences working as an energy trader, he wrote his first novel Short, which was released in September 2010 (St. Martin's Press). The novel received positive reviews from numerous publications, including The Washington Post, Denver Post, Publishers Weekly and Bloomberg/Business Week.

McMeel published short stories in a variety of magazines including Mississippi Review, The Gettysburg Review, Chicago Quarterly Review and The New Guard Literary Review. His articles on 20th century literature include 'When Businessmen Attack: Two Simenon Roman Durs' and 'B. Traven: The Writer Who Wasn't There.'

In 2006 McMeel co-founded the cult crime magazine Murdaland, which published original noir and dark literary fiction by Mary Gaitskill, Jayne Anne Phillips, Scott Phillips, Richard Bausch and others.

At the time of his death, McMeel was working on another novel.

== Later life and death ==
McMeel lived in Denver with his wife Sharon (née Zanoni). He had a son named Connor and a daughter named Marlowe. He died April 19, 2013. No cause of death was given.
