= Du Quoin Evening Call =

Newspaper in Du Quoin, Illinois

Du Quoin Call
- Type: Daily newspaper
- Owner: Southern Illinois LOCAL Media Group
- Founded: c. 1895
- Headquarters: 9 North Division Street, Du Quoin, Illinois 62832, United States
- OCLC number: 8807419
- Website: duquoin.com

The Du Quoin Call was an American daily newspaper published in Du Quoin, Illinois. In 1987, the paper was acquired by Hollinger. Former owner GateHouse Media purchased roughly 160 daily and weekly newspapers from Hollinger in 1997. The Call covered Du Quoin, Perry County, and the county seat of Pinckneyville.

The Call ceased publication in July 2022.
