= Lewis University =

Lasallian university in Romeoville, Illinois, US

Coordinates: 41.604781°N 88.080524°W

- Former names: List: Holy Name Technical School (1932-1934); Lewis Holy Name Technical School (1934-1935); Lewis Holy Name School of Aeronautics (1935-1952); Lewis College of Science & Technology (1952-1962); Lewis College (1962-1973)
- Motto: Signum Fidei (Latin)
- Motto in English: Sign of Faith
- Type: Private university
- Established: 1932; 94 years ago
- Founder: Bishop Bernard J. Scheil (Archdiocese of Chicago)
- Religious affiliation: Roman Catholic (Christian Brothers)
- Academic affiliations: ACCU CIC; NAICU
- Endowment: $98.8 million (2025)
- President: Christopher Sindt
- Students: 7,011 (fall 2024)
- Undergraduates: 4,326 (fall 2024)
- Postgraduates: 2,685 (fall 2024)
- Location: Romeoville, Illinois, United States
- Campus: 410 acres (170 ha); Suburban
- Newspaper: The Lewis Flyer
- Colors: Red and White
- Nickname: Flyers
- Sporting affiliations: NCAA Division II; GLVC, MIVA
- Website: lewisu.edu
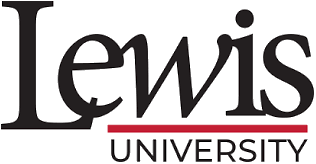

Lewis University is a private Lasallian university in Romeoville, Illinois, United States, enrolls approximately 7,000 students in over 80 undergraduate programs, 35 graduate programs, and offers accelerated programs for working adults. The National Weather Service's Chicago/Romeoville office is also situated on campus.

== History ==
Lewis University was founded in 1932 by the Archdiocese of Chicago and Bishop Bernard J. Scheil as the Holy Name Technical School. The school gets its name from philanthropist Frank J. Lewis who funded the construction of many of the school's buildings. During these early days, aviation technology courses were chosen as the special emphasis of instruction, becoming the origin of today's highly regarded Department of Aviation and Transportation Studies. The school was incorporated in 1934 under the name Lewis Holy Name Technical School. In 1935, it became Lewis Holy Name School of Aeronautics, a name which is engraved in stone on the building now known as the Philip Lynch Theatre at the Oremus Fine Arts Center.

During World War II, normal classes were suspended as the campus was given to the United States Navy to train pilots. The campus is adjacent to the Lewis University Airport. Regular classes resumed in late 1944 and the college soon adopted a more traditional arts and science curriculum. Women were admitted for the first time in 1949. Three years later, the school's name was changed to the Lewis College of Science and Technology. The institution's name was shortened to simply Lewis College in 1962 and finally received its current name of Lewis University in 1973.

In 2004 and 2005, Lewis enrolled more than 5,000 total students. In 2019, Lewis University offered more than 80 undergraduate majors and programs of study, an accelerated degree completion option for working adults, various aviation programs, and 35 graduate programs. The university also offers degree programs in Albuquerque, New Mexico.

In 2016, David J. Livingston, former president of Lourdes University in Sylvania, Ohio, succeeded James Gaffney as the 10th president of the university. Gaffney retired after 28 years of leadership and service to Lewis University and its students.

== Organization ==
- College of Aviation, Science and Technology
- College of Business
- College of Education and Social Sciences
- College of Humanities, Fine Arts and Communications
- College of Nursing and Health Sciences
- School of Graduate, Professional and Continuing Education

== Athletics ==
The Lewis athletic teams are called the Flyers. The university is a member of the Division II level of the National Collegiate Athletic Association (NCAA), primarily competing in the Great Lakes Valley Conference (GLVC) for most of its sports since the 1980–81 academic year; while its men's volleyball team compete in the Midwestern Intercollegiate Volleyball Association (MIVA). Since it is not a sponsored sport at the Division II level, the men's volleyball team is the only program that plays in Division I.

Prior to joining the NCAA, Lewis was a member of the National Association of Intercollegiate Athletics (NAIA), primarily competing in the Chicagoland Collegiate Athletic Conference (CCAC) from 1954–55 to 1979–80.

Lewis competes in 24 intercollegiate varsity sports: Men's sports include baseball, basketball, bowling, cross country, golf, lacrosse, soccer, swimming, tennis, track & field and volleyball; while women's sports include basketball, bowling, cross country, golf, lacrosse, soccer, softball, stunt, swimming, tennis, track & field and volleyball.

== Notable alumni ==
=== Arts, culture and entertainment ===
- Kay Cannon, wrote the screenplay for the Pitch Perfect movies, directed Blockers, 2021 Cinderella, 2010 Emmy nominee for Outstanding Writing in a Comedy Series (30 Rock), actress and improvisational performer
- John Caponera, television actor and comedian
- Chaka Khan, real name Yvette Marie Stevens, performer and eight-time Grammy award-winning artist; four-time American Music Award-winning artist; BET Lifetime Achievement Award winner
- John Loprieno, television actor in One Life to Live, Search for Tomorrow, and As the World Turns

=== Government, law, politics and activism ===
- James Laski, former Chicago City Clerk, controversial talk radio host, and author of My Fall From Grace — From City Hall to Prison Walls
- Edward Maloney, former member of the Illinois Senate
- Tim McCarthy, former Chief of Police of Orland Park, Illinois; former member of the United States Secret Service. During the 1981 Reagan assassination attempt, he turned into the line of fire, shielded Ronald Reagan, and was wounded from one of John Hinckley, Jr.'s bullets.
- Tom O'Halleran, member of the United States House of Representatives, representing Arizona's 1st congressional district
- Charles H. Ramsey, Commissioner of the Philadelphia Police Department (2008–present); Chief of the Metropolitan Police Department of the District of Columbia (1998–2006)
- Arthur Turner, member and Deputy Majority Leader of the Illinois House of Representatives
- Julia Tukai Zvobgo, Zimbabwean activist and politician
- Lisa Holder White, justice of the Illinois Supreme Court (2022-present).

=== Science, technology and medicine ===
- Michael H. Wynn, podiatrist responsible for the development of the CO_{2} laser technique for the treatment of bunions

== Campus media ==
- The Lewis Flyer
- WLRA (88.1 FM)

== See also ==
- Fitzpatrick House (Lockport, Illinois)
