= Olney Daily Mail =

Newspaper in Olney, Illinois

- Type: Daily newspaper
- Format: Broadsheet
- Editor: Mark Allen
- Founded: 1910
- Headquarters: 206 South Whittle Avenue, Olney, Illinois 62450; United States
- Circulation: 4330 (1999)
- OCLC number: 13344059
- Website: olneydailymail.com

The Olney Daily Mail is an American daily newspaper published in Olney, Illinois, and covering Richland County. The newspaper does not publish a Sunday edition. The current title began publication in 1910, at which time it supplanted or absorbed parts of four other newspapers. As of September 1999, the paper had a circulation of 4,330.

In 1998, then owner Hollinger International sold the newspaper to Leonard Green & Partners as part of a 40% overall divestment of Hollinger's United States newspaper holdings; the newspaper was published through Leonard Green's Liberty Group Publishing. Liberty Group Publishing was subsequently sold in 2005 to Fortress Investment Group and renamed to GateHouse Media.

Among newspapers noted as predecessors to the Daily Mail is Olney Times, which was published weekly on Fridays and began circulation c. 1856. In November 1857, a note to readers of the Olney Republican indicated that they would henceforth receive Olney Times instead, indicating the termination of the former periodical. The slogan for Olney Times was "Eternal Vigilance is the Price of Liberty."
