= Morrisonville Times =

Newspaper in Illinois, USA

- Type: Weekly newspaper
- Owner(s): Southern Illinois Local Media Group
- Publisher: Southern Illinois Local Media Group
- Editor: Rick Wade
- Founded: 1875
- Ceased publication: 2018
- Headquarters: Virden, Illinois, United States
- Circulation: 600

The Morrisonville Times is a weekly newspaper in Morrisonville, Christian County, Illinois, United States. The newspaper was started in 1875 by Thomas Cox. From August 1978 to 1996 the paper was owned and published by John Lennon of Springfield, IL, until his death. The newspaper converted to its current weekly format in 1996. For a five-year period, it was owned by Phillips Printing & Publishing with the corporate office located in Pana, Illinois at the Pana News-Palladium in Pana.

Beginning in February 2017, the Times was published as part of the Nokomis Free-Press Progress, until news coverage was handed off to the Panhandle Press in February 2018, following the sale of Pana News Inc. to Paddock Publications and under the management of Southern Illinois Local Media Group.

In February 2018 the newspaper discontinued publication as a standalone newspaper, with coverage combined with the Panhandle Press. The Panhandle Press, published by Southern Illinois Local Media Group's subsidiary Gold Nugget Publications, publishes four community papers in their cluster. The subsidiary facility, located in Virden, Illinois also publishes six other community newspapers for sister subsidiary Pana News Group, as well as several dozen newspapers in Southern Illinois.

The newspaper does not have a website, but maintains a Facebook page.
