= Suburban Life Media =

American newspaper publisher founded before 1954

Suburban Life Media is a Downers Grove, Illinois-based publisher of 20 weekly newspapers in Chicago's western and northern suburbs. Formerly known as Suburban Life Publications, it was purchased from GateHouse Media and renamed by current owner Shaw Media in October 2012.

== History ==
In the 1950s, Earl D. Eisenhower, brother of then president Dwight D. Eisenhower, served as general manager of Suburban Life Newspapers.

In October 2012, Gatehouse Media sold the publisher to Shaw Media. Upon acquisition, Shaw Media moved some of the Suburban Life newspapers to other units. The three "Republican" newspapers moved under the Kane County Chronicle editorial umbrella. The two "Farmside" newspapers were combined into McHenry Farmside and moved under Northwest Herald. Under Shaw Media ownership, Suburban Life Media introduced the Suburban Life magazine, which followed the similar format and basic template as Shaw Media's Lake County, McHenry County and Kane County magazines.

In October 2013, Shaw Media revamped the Suburban Life newspapers that haven't been moved to other publishers. All newspapers were renamed to "[Municipality] Suburban Life." The previously unrelated Lake County Journal, Gurnee Life and Barrington Life were moved to Suburban Life Media and were redesigned to fit the publisher's format, becoming Lake County Suburban Life, Gurnee Suburban Life and Barrington Suburban Life, respectively. As part of the revamp, the Lake County Magazine became the Lake County edition of the Suburban Life magazine.

== List of newspapers ==
=== Cook County ===
- Berwyn Suburban Life – Berwyn and Cicero (formerly Berwyn Life)
- La Grange Suburban Life – La Grange, Westchester and Western Springs
- Lemont Suburban Life– Lemont (formerly Lemont Reporter)
- Riverside & Brookfield Suburban Life – Riverside and Brookfield

=== DuPage County ===
- Addison Suburban Life– Addison, Bensenville and Wood Dale (formerly Addison Press)
- Carol Stream Suburban Life – Carol Stream, Bloomingdale, Glendale Heights and Roselle (formerly Carol Stream Press)
- Downers Grove Suburban Life – Downers Grove (formerly Downers Grove Reporter)
- Elmhurst Suburban Life – Elmhurst (formerly Elmhurst Press)
- Glen Ellyn Suburban Life – Glen Ellyn (formerly Glen Ellyn News)
- Hinsdale Suburban Life – Hinsdale, Burr Ridge, Clarendon Hills, Darien and Oak Brook
- Lisle Suburban Life – Lisle (formerly Lisle Reporter)
- Lombard Suburban Life – Lombard (formerly Lombard Spectator)
- Villa Park Suburban Life – Villa Park and Oakbrook Terrace (formerly Villa Park Argus)
- West Chicago Suburban Life – West Chicago, Warrenville and Winfield (formerly West Chicago Press)
- Westmont Suburban Life – Westmont (formerly Westmont Progress)
- Wheaton Suburban Life – Wheaton (formerly Wheaton Leader)
- Woodridge Suburban Life – Woodridge (formerly Woodridge Reporter)

=== Lake County ===
- Barrington Suburban Life – Barrington (originally Barrington Life)
- Lake County Suburban Life– Grayslake (formerly the Lake County Journal)

=== Will County ===
- Bolingbrook Suburban Life – Bolingbrook (formerly Bolingbrook Reporter)
