= The Petersburg Observer =

Newspaper in Petersburg, Illinois

Petersburg Observer
- Type: Weekly newspaper
- Format: Broadsheet
- Owner: Petersburg Observer Corporation
- Publisher: Cain & Parks
- Editor: Jane Cutright
- Founded: 1878
- Headquarters: Petersburg, Illinois
- Circulation: 3,100
- OCLC number: 25321748
- Website: thepetersburgobserver.com

The Petersburg Observer is a weekly newspaper based in Petersburg, Illinois founded in G. W. Cain and William Parks in 1878. Jane Cutright is the current editor. It is published every Wednesday. It has a circulation of 3,100 and is owned by the Petersburg Observer Corporation.
