= 22nd Century Media =

American Mass and Media Company

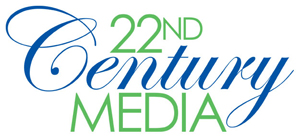
- Industry: Publishing, Media, Internet
- Founded: 2005
- Defunct: 2020
- Website: 22ndcenturymedia.com

22nd Century Media was an American media company based in the suburbs of Chicago. The company was founded in 2005 and at one time published 14 weekly community newspapers. The publications had roughly 160,000 subscribers.

It ceased operations April 7, 2020, citing "the economic impact of the coronavirus on all small businesses, from which we earn a large majority of our advertising base."

== Online ==
In addition to the print content, each paper posted interactive videos, photo galleries, and a calendar online.

== Newspapers ==
- The Lake Forest Leader
- The Glencoe Anchor
- The Highland Park Landmark
- The Northbrook Tower
- The Wilmette Beacon
- The Winnetka Current
- The Glenview Lantern
- The Homer Horizon
- The Lockport Legend
- The Mokena Messenger
- The New Lenox Patriot
- The Orland Park Prairie
- The Tinley Junction
- The Frankfort Station

== Magazine ==
- Chicagoly
