= Oak Park Journal =

Newspaper in Oak Park, Illinois, USA

The Oak Park Journal was a weekly newspaper for Oak Park, Illinois. It was published by Suburban Journals of Chicago, Inc. Ed Vincent was the editor.
