= Romeoville, Illinois =

- Village
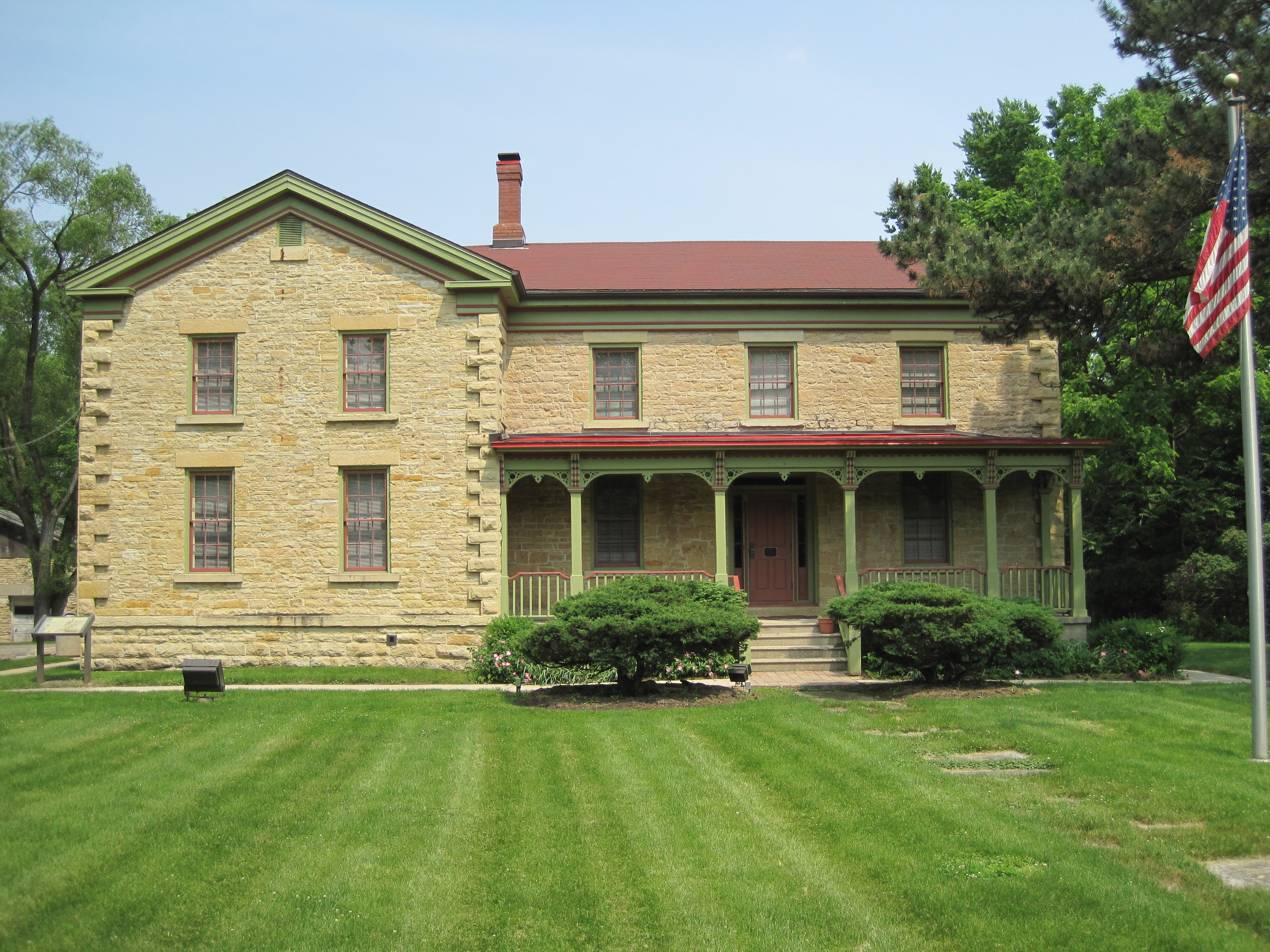
- Fitzpatrick House (1842), on the grounds of Lewis University

- Flag Logo
- Nickname: "Stone City"
- Motto: Where Community Matters!
- Location of Romeoville in Will County, Illinois

- Location within Illinois Location within the United States
- Country: United States
- State: Illinois
- County: Will
- Township: DuPage, Lockport, Plainfield, Wheatland
- Incorporated: January 19, 1895

Government
  - Mayor: John Noak

Area
  - Total: 20.16 sq mi (52.21 km^{2})
  - Land: 19.13 sq mi (49.55 km^{2})
  - Water: 1.03 sq mi (2.67 km^{2})
- Elevation: 630 ft (190 m)

Population (2020)
  - Total: 39,863
  - Density: 2,083.9/sq mi (804.58/km^{2})
- Time zone: UTC−6 (CST)
  - Summer (DST): UTC−5 (CDT)
- ZIP Codes: 60446, 60491
- Area codes: 815/779 and 630/331
- FIPS code: 17-65442
- GNIS feature ID: 2399114
- Website: http://www.romeoville.org/

Romeoville is a village in Will County, Illinois, United States. The village is located 26 mi (42 km) southwest of Chicago on the Gateway Wetlands, directly west of the Des Plaines River and Historic U.S. Route 66 (now IL-53). Per the 2020 census, the population was 39,863. Once a small river port, Romeoville experienced rapid growth in the 1990s and 2000s. It is located between Bolingbrook and Joliet near Interstate 55 and Interstate 355.

== History ==
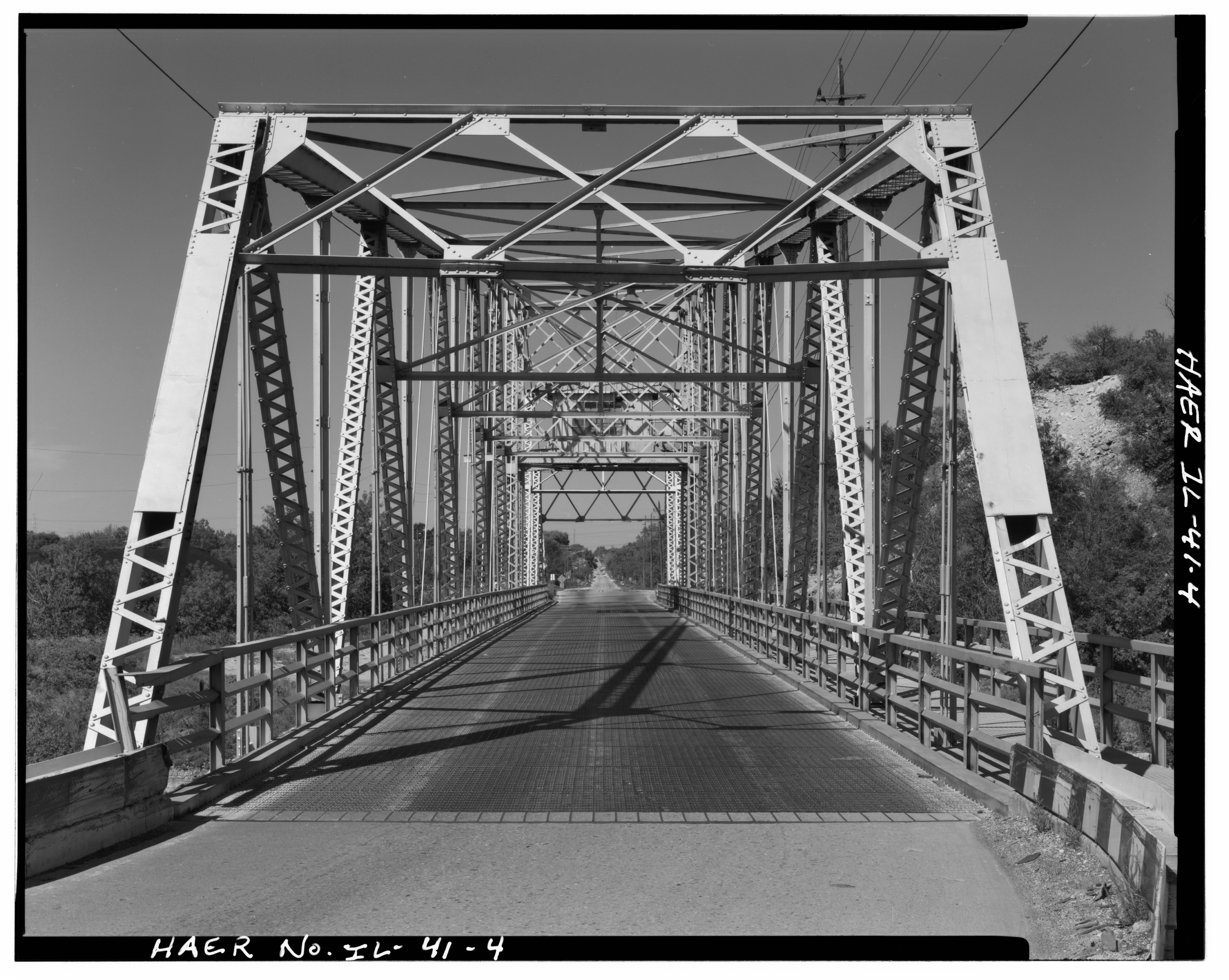
Isle a La Cache Bridge on Romeo Road, 1968

Romeoville was one of the last areas of Will County occupied by Native Americans. The village of Romeo was first settled on September 14, 1835, on Isle a la Cache, a small island in the Des Plaines River. Around this time, the first bridge was built to allow access to the island from the west bank of the river. In 1848, the I&M Canal was finished, drawing new residents to the area. On January 19, 1895, residents of Romeo voted to incorporate and changed the village's name to Romeoville. The community, along with nearby Joliet, became known as "Stone City" in reference to its prosperous limestone quarries. The Illinois State Capitol in Springfield was unveiled in 1888, and is constructed entirely of Romeoville limestone. Lewis University was established on the outskirts of town in 1934.

Romeoville is home to Citgo's Lemont Refinery. The refinery was constructed in 1922 across the river from the village. It was later the site of the 1984 Romeoville petroleum refinery disaster.

In 1950, Romeoville had approximately 46 homes and a population of 147. The village remained sparsely populated until 1957, when over 600 acres (240 ha) of wetlands along IL-53 became the Hampton Park Subdivision. An additional 400 acres (160 ha) were added in 1964, as Romeoville's population slowly grew. On October 5, 1990, the first interchange on I-55 and Weber Road was built, improving the connectivity of the village to the rest of the Chicago metropolitan area. Throughout the following decade, the area along Weber Road quickly became suburbanized as several new housing developments were completed. Romeoville was one of the fastest-growing communities in Illinois throughout the 1990s and 2000s. The population grew rapidly, and the village experienced an influx of over 25,000 new residents in two decades.

== Geography ==
According to the 2010 census, Romeoville has a total area of 18.759 square miles (48.59 km^{2}), of which 18.44 square miles (47.76 km^{2}), comprising 98.3%, is land and 0.319 square miles (0.83 km^{2}), comprising 1.7%, is water.

=== Climate ===
Romeoville is home to a National Weather Service forecast office, although bulletins issued by said office begin, "The National Weather Service in Chicago..."

== Demographics ==
Historical population
Census	Pop.	Note	%±
1900	113		—
1910	98		−13.3%
1920	74		−24.5%
1930	133		79.7%
1940	170		27.8%
1950	147		−13.5%
1960	3,574		2,331.3%
1970	12,888		260.6%
1980	15,519		20.4%
1990	14,074		−9.3%
2000	21,153		50.3%
2010	39,680		87.6%
2020	39,863		0.5%
U.S. Decennial Census; 2010 2020

=== Racial and ethnic composition ===
Romeoville village, Illinois – Racial and ethnic composition Note: the US Census treats Hispanic/Latino as an ethnic category. This table excludes Latinos from the racial categories and assigns them to a separate category. Hispanics/Latinos may be of any race.
Race / Ethnicity (NH = Non-Hispanic)	Pop 2000	Pop 2010	Pop 2020	% 2000	% 2010	% 2020
White alone (NH)	16,336	19,992	16,654	77.23%	50.38%	41.78%
Black or African American alone (NH)	1,121	4,545	5,362	5.30%	11.45%	13.45%
Native American or Alaska Native alone (NH)	49	61	32	0.23%	0.15%	0.08%
Asian alone (NH)	504	2,486	2,718	2.38%	6.27%	6.82%
Native Hawaiian or Pacific Islander alone (NH)	4	3	2	0.02%	0.01%	0.01%
Other race alone (NH)	33	53	121	0.16%	0.13%	0.30%
Mixed race or Multiracial (NH)	325	657	1,166	1.54%	1.66%	2.93%
Hispanic or Latino (any race)	2,781	11,883	13,808	13.15%	29.95%	34.64%
Total	21,153	39,680	39,863	100.00%	100.00%	100.00%

=== 2020 census ===
As of the 2020 census, Romeoville had a population of 39,863. The median age was 36.1 years. 25.1% of residents were under the age of 18 and 11.1% of residents were 65 years of age or older. For every 100 females there were 96.0 males, and for every 100 females age 18 and over there were 92.5 males age 18 and over.

100.0% of residents lived in urban areas, while 0.0% lived in rural areas.

There were 13,022 households in Romeoville, of which 41.0% had children under the age of 18 living in them. Of all households, 55.0% were married-couple households, 13.9% were households with a male householder and no spouse or partner present, and 24.2% were households with a female householder and no spouse or partner present. About 19.6% of all households were made up of individuals and 7.6% had someone living alone who was 65 years of age or older.

There were 13,597 housing units, of which 4.2% were vacant. The homeowner vacancy rate was 2.0% and the rental vacancy rate was 9.9%.

== Economy ==
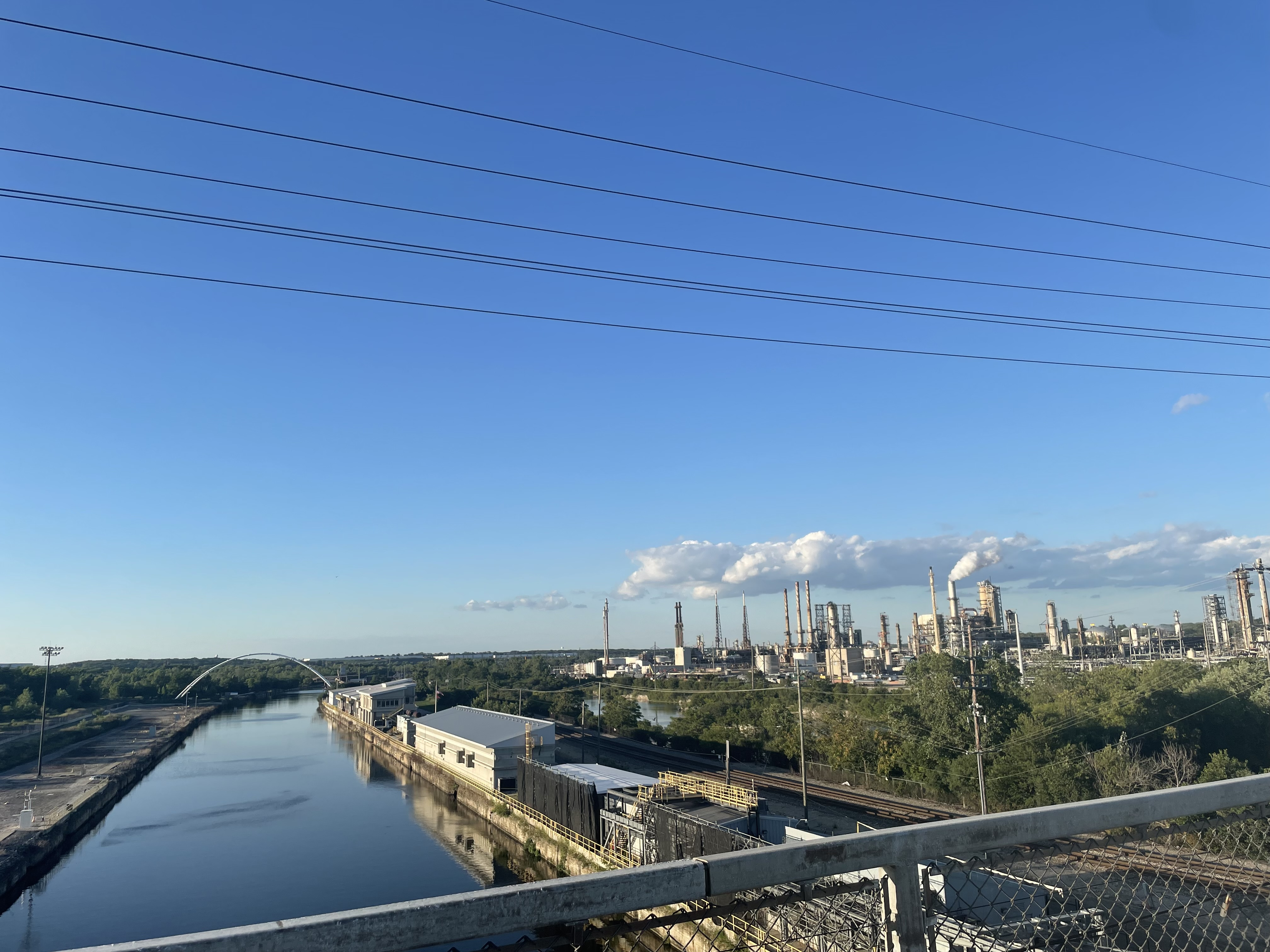
A Commonwealth Edison substation in Romeoville, next to the Chicago Sanitary and Ship Canal

Romeoville is home to over 600 businesses. In 2013, the village won a Gold Medal from the International Economic Development Council and Atlas Integrated in the High Performance Economic Development category. They earned the award by creating 1,560 jobs during 2012–2013, which was the most for a town with a population between 25,001 and 100,000.

=== Top employers ===
According to the village website, the top employers in the village are:

#	Employer	# of Employees
1	Amazon	1,824
2	Valley View School District 365U	1,300
3	Green Core	1,200
4	PDV Midwest Refining CITGO	803
5	Aryzta	600
6	Ulta Beauty	543
7	Walmart	537
8	RTC	530
9	Magid Glove and Safety	529
10	Lewis University	525

Other major employers include Kehe Foods, FedEx Ground, and the Village of Romeoville.

== Education ==
=== K–12 education ===
Romeoville residents attend the following schools:

Valley View School District 365U

- Valley View Early Childhood Center
- Beverly Skoff Elementary School
- Irene King Elementary School
- Kenneth L. Hermansen Elementary School
- Robert C. Hill Elementary School
- A. Vito Martinez Middle School
- John J. Lukancic Middle School
- Romeoville High School
- St. Andrew the Apostle School

Plainfield Community Consolidated School District 202

- Eichelberger Elementary School
- Creekside Elementary School
- Lakewood Falls Elementary School
- John F Kennedy Middle School
- Indian Trails Middle School
- Plainfield East High School

Lockport Township High School District 205

- Lockport Township High School

=== Higher education ===
- Joliet Junior College – Romeoville Campus
- Rasmussen College – Romeoville Campus
- Lewis University – Main Campus

== Government ==
=== Mayors ===
Mayors of Romeoville
Years in Office	Mayor
1895–1899	Louis Hamann
1899–1903	John J. Keig
1904–1905	Henry Brockman
1906–1907	George Garden
1907–1909	George Farrell
1910–1915	Edward Swanson
1915–1919	Joseph Startz
1919–1920	John Mitchell
1921–1927	Fred Boehme
1928–1929	Anthony Startz
1929–1969	Neal Murphy
1969–1973	John O'Hara
1973–1977	Dewey "Red" Chambers
1977–1981	Donald Kennedy
1981–1985	Howard Trippett
1985–1993	John Strobbe
1993–1997	Sandra Gulden
1997–2009	Fred Dewald
2009–present	John Noak

== Infrastructure ==
=== Transportation ===
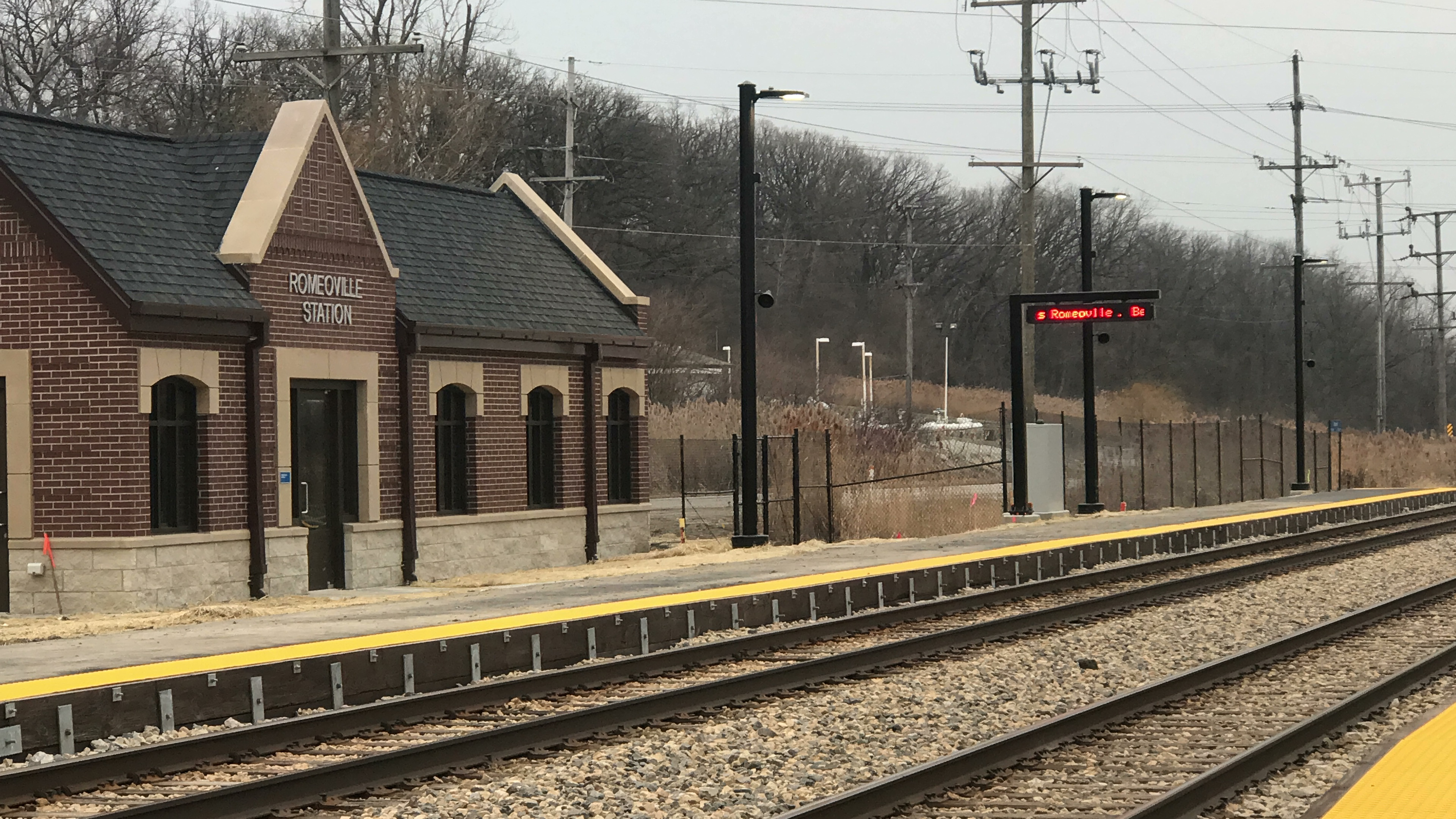
Romeoville station (Metra)

- Metra station on the Heritage Corridor line.
- Lewis University Airport for basic aircraft to Boeing Business class.
- Pace bus route 834.

=== Major highways ===
Major highways in Romeoville include:

Interstate Highways
Interstate 55
Interstate 355

US Highways
Historic US 66

Illinois Highways
Route 7
Route 53

== Notable people ==
- Gerald Coleman, played goalie for the Lake Erie Monsters and Tampa Bay Lightning.
- Egotistico Fantastico, pro wrestler
- Oliver Gibson, DT, played with the Pittsburgh Steelers and the Cincinnati Bengals.
- Sandra Navarro Gillette, singer who charted a 1994 worldwide hit single, graduated from Romeoville High School.
- Antonio Morrison, LB, played with the Indianapolis Colts and Green Bay Packers.
- Byron Stingily, OT, played with the Tennessee Titans and Pittsburgh Steelers.
