= Cochrane Library =

Collection of databases in medicine and other healthcare specialties

- Cochrane Library logo
- Producer: Cochrane

Access
- Providers: John Wiley & Sons
- Cost: Subscription with limited preview

Coverage
- Disciplines: Healthcare
- Format coverage: Reviews
- Geospatial coverage: Worldwide

Links
- Website: www.cochranelibrary.com

The Cochrane Library (named after Archie Cochrane) is a collection of databases in medicine and other healthcare specialties provided by Cochrane and other organizations. At its core is the collection of Cochrane Reviews, a database of systematic reviews and meta-analyses that summarize and interpret the results of medical research. The Cochrane Library aims to make the results of well-conducted clinical trials readily available and is a key resource in evidence-based medicine.

== Access and use ==
The Cochrane Library is a subscription-based database, published initially by Update Software and now published by John Wiley & Sons, Ltd. as part of Wiley Online Library. In many countries, including parts of Canada, the United Kingdom, Ireland, the Scandinavian countries, New Zealand, Australia, India, South Africa, and Poland, it has been made available free to all residents by "national provision" (typically a government or Department of Health pays for the license). Other countries negotiate for a national license, which similarly provides free Cochrane access to all residents; in Switzerland, the national license is funded by the Swiss Academy of Medical Sciences, the Consortium of Swiss Academic Libraries, university hospitals, and the Federal Office of Public Health. There are also arrangements for free access in much of Latin America and in "low-income countries", typically via HINARI. All countries have free access to two-page abstracts of all Cochrane Reviews and short plain-language summaries of selected articles.

Cochrane Reviews appear to be relatively underused in the United States for two reasons: 1) Public access to the Cochrane Library in the United States is limited (the state of Wyoming is an exception, having paid for a license to enable free access to Cochrane Reviews for all residents of Wyoming). 2) The government-funded U.S. National Library of Medicine maintains an alternative database MEDLINE, which is free of charge to everyone and has significantly more extensive coverage than Cochrane.

From 26 March to 26 May 2020, the Cochrane Library provided temporary unrestricted access to everyone in every country in response to the COVID-19 pandemic.

== Contents ==
The Cochrane Library consists of the following databases after significant changes in 2018:

- The Cochrane Database of Systematic Reviews (Cochrane Reviews). Contains all the peer-reviewed systematic reviews and protocols (Cochrane Protocols) prepared by the Cochrane Review Groups.
- The Cochrane Central Register of Controlled Trials (CENTRAL). CENTRAL is a database that contains details of articles of controlled trials and other studies of healthcare interventions from bibliographic databases (majorly MEDLINE and EMBASE), and other published and unpublished sources that are difficult to access, including trials from the trial registries such as International Clinical Trials Registry Platform (ICTRP) and ClinicalTrials.gov. However, systematic reviewers need to search not only CENTRAL but also ICTRP and ClinicalTrials.gov to identify unpublished studies.
- Cochrane Clinical Answers. These evidence summaries on a variety of questions of interest to healthcare professionals have a user-friendly presentation with graphics and high-level conclusions of the research evidence based on Cochrane Reviews.

The Cochrane Library now also features results from Special Collections and Editorials as well as an option to link out to other reviews compiled by Epistemonikos.

The Cochrane Database of Systematic Reviews, Cochrane Protocols, and CENTRAL are produced by Cochrane.

== The Cochrane Database of Systematic Reviews ==
The Cochrane Database of Systematic Reviews
- Discipline: Medicine
- Language: English
- Edited by: Dr Karla Soares-Weiser

Publication details
- History: 1996–present
- Publisher: Wiley
- Impact factor: 11.874 (2021)

Standard abbreviations
- ISO 4: Cochrane Database Syst. Rev.

Indexing
- ISSN: 2044-4702 (print); 1469-493X (web)
- LCCN: 99039924

The Cochrane reviews take the format of full-length methodological studies. Cochrane researchers will perform searches of medical and health databases including MEDLINE/PubMed, EMBASE, PsycINFO, CINAHL, etc.; a continually updated database of trials called the Cochrane Central Register of Controlled Trials (CENTRAL); hand searching, where researchers look through entire libraries of scientific journals by hand and; reference checking of obtained articles in order to identify additional studies that are relevant to the question they are attempting to answer. The quality of each study is carefully assessed using predefined criteria and evidence of weak methodology or the possibility that a study may have been affected by bias is reported in the review.

Cochrane researchers then apply statistical analysis to compare the data of the trials. This creates a review of studies, or systematic review, giving a comprehensive view of the efficacy of a particular medical intervention. Finished reviews are available as a full report with diagrams, in condensed form or as a plain language summary, in order to provide for every reader of the review.

=== Abstracting and indexing ===
According to Journal Citation Reports, The Cochrane Database of Systematic Reviews has a 2021 impact factor of 11.874, ranking 20th of 172 journals in the Medicine, General and Internal category, down from 11th in 2020 (167 journals). Reviews are abstracted and indexed in the following bibliographic databases: Science Citation Index Expanded, Scopus, CINAHL, EMBASE, MEDLINE.

=== Academic comments ===
The Cochrane Library Feedback tool allows users to provide comments on and feedback of Cochrane Reviews and Protocols in The Cochrane Library. If accepted, the feedback will be published in a scrolling list of comments in reverse chronological order, with the most recent submission at the top of the page. The Collaboration has a procedure for the event of serious error, an event which has only occurred once in its history.

=== Supplements ===
Annual colloquia have been conducted by Cochrane since 1993. From 1994 onwards, Cochrane has maintained a database of posters and presentations of past colloquia. From 2009 onwards, Cochrane published the abstracts of those colloquia as supplements to the Cochrane Database of Systematic Reviews. From 2010 to 2016, an annual newsletter related to Cochrane methodology called Cochrane Methods (ISSN 2044-4702), was published as an annual supplement.

== See also ==
- List of academic databases and search engines
