= Miles Reiter =

American businessman

- Born: Joseph Miles Reiter
- Education: Princeton University
- Occupation: Businessman
- Known for: former CEO of Driscoll's
- Spouse: Roseanne Reiter
- Children: 4

Joseph Miles Reiter (born c. 1950) is an American businessman, and the former CEO of Driscoll's, a privately-held company, 70% owned by the Reiter family, and the world's largest supplier of berries.

== Biography ==
Miles Reiter is the grandson of Joseph "Ed" Reiter, co-founder along with R.O. Driscoll of the Driscoll's berry company, with a net worth of 28 billion dollars. The Reiter family owns around 70 percent of the company, which (aside from berry production) develops and licenses the fruits’ proprietary breeds. Following the family tradition, after graduation from Princeton University, he became a strawberry farmer in around 1970 in the Pajaro Valley, and became the chairman of Driscoll's in 1998, becoming CEO in 2000. Reiter works at Driscoll's corporate office in Watsonville, California at the mouth of the Pajaro Valley. His daughter, Brie Reiter Smith, is following family tradition, farming blueberries in Chile, and his son is farming strawberries in Santa Maria, California.

Under Reiter's stewardship, Driscoll's has become the largest berry supplier in the United States. He has been chairman of the California Strawberry Commission and of the Community Foundation of Santa Cruz County. He is on the board of the Produce Marketing Association (PMA), and has been a director of the Western Growers Association since November 2006. He was a director of Produce Marketing Association from October 2008 to October 2011.

In April 2015, Reiter announced that Kevin Murphy, the company's then president and COO, would assume the CEO role. Reiter continues as chairman of the board. In November 2018, Reiter reassumed the position of CEO. In October 2023, Driscolls board of directors announced Soren Bjorn would be promoted to CEO and succeed Reiter, who was set to retire in January 2024.

== Innovations and awards ==
Reiter worked to improve strawberry varieties, expanding on the original Sweet Briar strawberries variety. Additional innovations in the industry have resulted in year-round production of fruit, making a steady presence of fruit in the supermarkets. In 2007, Reiter put a conservation easement on 103 acres of farmland to help save the Pajaro Valley from citification.

== Contributions ==
Reiter has spoken publicly about the need for groundwater reform in California agriculture. He has written an editorial statement published in 2015. In addition, Reiter plays an active role in support of CERES.

== Personal life ==
He is married to Roseanne, and they have four adult children.
