= List of clinical trial registries =

The list of clinical trial registries includes any clinical trial registration system managed by a government or other organization.

== Global registry ==
The World Health Organization's International Clinical Trials Registry Platform (ICTRP) acts as a voluntary coordinating body for many international registries, including many of those listed below.

== National and regional registries ==
=== Africa ===
The Pan-African clinical trials registry (PACTR) is available at pactr.org. It is funded by the European and Developing Countries Clinical Trials Partnership (EDCTP) and operates out of the South African Cochrane Centre (Cochrane Collaboration) based at the South African Medical Research Council. PACTR contributes data to the WHO's ICTRP.

=== Australia and New Zealand ===
Australia and New Zealand share the ANZCTR registry located at: anzctr.org.au. Registering trials with the ANZCTR is voluntary. It is publicly owned and managed by a non-profit organization and is funded by an enabling grant from Australia's National Health and Medical Research Council (NHMRC).

=== Brazil ===
Brazil has a registry (Registro Brasileiro de Ensaios Clínicos, ReBEC): ensaiosclinicos.gov.br. ReBEC is a project of the Brazilian Ministry of Health, the Panamerican Health Organization (PAHO) and the Oswaldo Cruz Foundation (FIOCRUZ).

=== Canada ===
The Canadian Institutes of Health Research (CIHR) participates with the ISRCTN.

=== China ===
China's clinical trial registry is called ChiCTR: chictr.org.cn. It is available in Mandarin Chinese and English. It was established in October 2005. It participates in the WHO's ICTRP.

=== Cuba ===
Cuba's clinical registry is the RPCEC (Cuban Public Registry of Clinical Trials).

=== European Union ===
EudraCT is a database of all clinical trials conducted in the European Union since 1 May 2004. Initially a non-public database, it was launched for the public as EU Clinical Trials Register in March 2011.

=== Germany ===
Germany's clinical trials registry, the DRKS, is available at drks.de. The DRKS is an open access, free of charge online register for clinical trials and is available both in English and German. DRKS is part of the WHO's ICTRP. The DRKS works with two partner registries in Germany, DeReG (German Registry for Somatic Gene-Transfer Trials) and Clinical Trial Registry of the University Medical Center Freiburg.

=== India ===
India's clinical trials registry is Clinical Trials Registry – India. CTRI is in English and it participates in the WHO's ICTRP.

=== Iran ===
Iran's registry, the IRCT, is available at irct.ir. It is run and funded by the Iranian Ministry of Health and Medical Education.

=== Japan ===
Japan has three registries that work as a network called the Japan Primary Registries Network (JPRN). Its search portal is hosted by the Japanese National Institute of Public Health. While the search portal is only available in Japanese, the three registries' sites are also available in English:

- University Hospital Medical Information Network (UMIN CTR)
- Japan Pharmaceutical Information Center - Clinical Trials Information (JapicCTI)
- Japan Medical Association - Center for Clinical Trials (JMACCT CTR)

=== Netherlands ===
The Netherlands registry participates with WHO and its website is trialregister.nl. Clinical trial data are available in English.

=== South Africa ===
South Africa's Department of Health announced in November 2005, that clinical trials conducted in the country must be submitted to the South African National Clinical Trials Register located at: sanctr.gov. Clinical trial guidelines for South Africa are available at the Department of Health's official site.

=== South Korea ===
South Korea's registry is Clinical Research Information Service (CRiS) and available at https://web.archive.org/web/20101121001837/http://ncrc.cdc.go.kr/cris/index.jsp. It is managed by the Korea Centers for Disease Control and Prevention and funded by South Korea's Ministry of Health and Welfare.

=== Sri Lanka ===
The Sri Lanka Clinical Trials Registry (SLCTR) is available at slctr.lk. It is funded by the Sri Lanka Medical Association and managed by the Sri Lanka Clinical Trials Registry Committee.

=== United Kingdom ===
The ISRCTN registry was launched in 2000. Originally ISRCTN stood for 'International Standard Randomised Controlled Trial Number'; however, the scope of the registry has widened beyond randomized controlled trials to include any study designed to assess the efficacy of health interventions in a human population. It registers both observational and interventional trials and content is curated by a team of expert editors.

=== United States ===
Clinical trials in the US are registered on clinicaltrials.gov. Clinicaltrials.gov is the largest clinical trials registry. Clinical trials conducted in the United States are required to be registered in the registry. Its registrations represent about 75% of what is available through the WHO portal (ICTRP). Problems of concordance between ClinicalTrials.gov records and published records have been identified for many protocol and results items. The registry traces back to the Health Omnibus Programs Extension Act of 1988 (HOPE or Public Law 100-607) which mandated the development of a database of AIDS Clinical Trials Information System. It would later be expanded under the Food and Drug Administration Modernization Act of 1997 (FDAMA or Public Act 105-115). The registry is run by the United States National Library of Medicine (NLM).

=== Other registries ===
Clinical trial registries are also set up and managed by governmental organizations, non-governmental organizations, universities, as well as commercial and nonprofit entities. This includes pharmaceutical companies, international organizations, and health organizations. A list is available at http://www.circare.org/registries.htm.

The IFPMA Clinical Trials Portal is a major pharmaceutical industry initiative designed to increase the transparency of clinical trials by providing a convenient "one-stop-shop" for published clinical trial information. It helps to fulfill the commitment made by the research-based pharmaceutical industry in its Joint Position on the Disclosure of Clinical Trial Information via Clinical Trial Registries and Databases. It is available here.
