= Drug recall =

Legal action against a prescription drug

A drug recall removes a prescription or over-the-counter drug from the market. Drug recalls in the United States are made by the FDA or the creators of the drug when certain criteria are met. When a drug recall is made, the drug is removed from the market and potential legal action can be taken depending on the severity of the drug recall.

Drug recalls are classified in the US by the FDA in three different categories. Class I recalls are the most severe and indicate that exposure and/or consumption of the drug will lead to adverse health effects or death. Class II recalls refer to drugs that induce temporary and/or medically reversible health effects. Class III recalls occur when adverse health effects are not likely to occur when consuming the drug or being exposed to it.

There are also market withdrawals and medical device safety alerts'. Market withdrawals occur when a product has a minor violation that does not require FDA legal action. Medical device safety alerts occur when there are unreasonable safety risks associated with using a product.

== Examples in the United States ==
A more comprehensive list of drug recalls worldwide can be found here: List of withdrawn drugs.

=== Mrs. Winslow's Soothing Syrup ===
Mrs. Winslow's Soothing Syrup introduced as a soothing agent for both humans and animals, but was primarily advertised to help soothe teething babies. Though not directly affiliated with the FDA, Mrs. Winslow's Soothing Syrup was denounced by the American Medical Association in 1911 via their article titled "Baby Killers." The syrup was sold until as late as 1930 in the United Kingdom.

=== Diethylstilbestrol (DES) ===
In 1971, Diethylstilbestrol (DES) was recalled from the market. It was intended to be used to prevent prenatal problems during pregnancy. Women who took DES were shown to have a greater chance of having breast cancer. It is estimated that 5 to 10 million persons were exposed to DES until its recall in 1971. Both mothers and second generation daughters are confirmed to have adverse side effects from DES. Daughters of DES Mothers are more than twice as likely to form breast cancer and are 2.4 times as likely to be infertile. Sons of DES mothers have displayed side effects like genital abnormalities, non-cancerous epididymal cysts, and infertility. The Third Generation of people exposed to DES are just now entering into an age where reproductive problems and abnormalities can be studied. No viable results currently exist.

== Reasons for drug recall ==
The FDA will issue different levels of recall depending on the severity of the effects. From most to least severe, there is Class I, Class II, and Class III (defined above). There is also market withdrawal which occurs when a drug does not violate FDA regulation but has a known, minor default. The producer must either fix the default or take the drug off the market.

Drugs and medical devices are typically recalled if the product is defective, contaminated, contains a foreign object, fails to meet specifications, mislabeled, or misbranded. Misbranding was the most common reason for pharmaceutical recalls in 2015, accounting for 42%.

=== Drug Recalls by Class in the United States ===
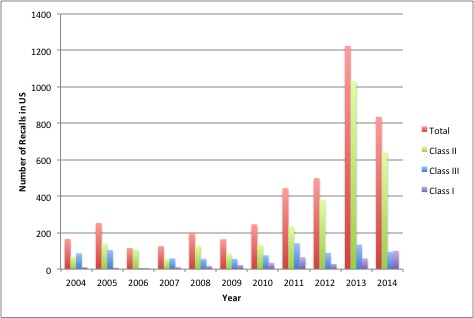

This graph charts the rise in drug recalls by class in the United States from 2004 to 2014 with data from Regulatory Affairs Professionals Society

== Recall process ==
The recall process in the United States follows three approximate phases. Distinct difficulties arise depending on the type of drug being recalled.

Drug recalls can be initiated by the producing firm or the FDA, and those launched by the FDA can be either mandatory or voluntary. This is applicable not just to drugs but all products covered under the FDA.

=== Notification and response ===
A firm submitting a recall to the FDA must provide all relevant information about the specific drug, including but not limited to: product name, use, description, and at least two samples of product (including packaging, instructions, inserts, etc.).

The firm must explain the problem they found with the product, how they found this problem, and the reason the problem occurred. For example, if the firm finds a leaking pipe near a product assembly line and tests for batches of the drug produced on that line are positive for contamination, they would submit that as the reason to how they believe their products came to be affected. After submitting a field report, the potential risks will be assessed.

=== Processing and tracking ===
In processing the recall, a Health Hazard Assessment will be conducted by the FDA to determine the recall class (defined above). Level, notification, instructions, mechanics, impacts on economy, and individual consumer must all be considered in determining recall strategy. Level of recall refers to which part of the distribution chain to which the recall is extended (wholesale, retail, pharmacy, medical user, etc.). Notification is the way consumers are alerted to the recall. In cases of a severe health hazard, a press release must be promptly issued. The FDA recommends a written notification, so consumers will have lasting documentation. There are guidelines for notification depending on type; these types include: mail, phone, facsimile, e-mail, media. Instructions and mechanics are information provided to the consumer regarding appropriate action for the recall. The instructions include if the product is to be returned, and if so, where and how they should return the product. It is important to consider the recalled drug's place in the market, should the recall lead to market shortages.

=== Compliance and reporting ===
The FDA will conduct an Effectiveness Check to determine the success of the recall. The drug will either undergo controlled destruction or reconditioning (i.e. relabeling with the correct label). Status reports are conducted throughout the recall to determine effectiveness.

The root cause of the recall must be addressed and corrected to prevent future occurrences. After all corrective action is acknowledged and carried out, the FDA can terminate the recall.

=== Drug type ===
OTC, prescription, and compounded drugs (drugs tailored to a specific patient) each pose unique challenges to the recall process.

Over the counter drugs are widely distributed and there is no direct link between company and consumer. Recalls are typically only advertised online and in the media, so consumers are subject to their own awareness. Lot numbers indicated on the packing allow only those affected to participate in recall.

Prescription drug recalls are made simpler because they follow supply chain: the manufacturer notifies the pharmacy who notifies the patient. However, since there is not a lot/batch number on packaging, recalls must rely on date ranges (date the prescription was filled) whose inaccuracy may lead to higher costs.

Compounded drugs are simple to recall because there is a direct link to patient. Despite the seeming simplicity, the offending component is typically identified across multiple drug classifications, expanding the recall.

== Changes in United States government policy ==
Although incomplete, this list highlights some changes in United States government policy that have had an effect on drug recalls.

=== National Childhood Vaccine Injury Act ===
The National Childhood Vaccine Injury Act of 1986 recognized the threat of injury and death that vaccines can pose. It allowed for financial compensation of the family should such threats come to light, and it increased vaccination safety precautions. If the federal compensation is not sufficient or not granted, this act allowed patients to take legal action for vaccine injuries. This is relevant to drug recalls because a vaccine producer is responsible for reparative damages if their vaccine causes injury and was not recalled.

=== FDA Modernization Act of 1997 ===
The Food and Drug Administration Modernization Act of 1997 was passed in order to streamline the FDA to meet standards of efficiency expected by the 21st century. In regards to drugs, the act lowered the regulatory obligations of pharmaceutical companies, allowing them to rely on one clinical trial for approval. It is still the assumption, however, that two trials are necessary to determine safety and effectiveness.

In addition to lower regulatory hurdles, the act allowed for the advertisement of "off label" uses. The effects of this could be unnecessary overuse of the product by consumers and larger profits for the firm. Apropos to medical devices, private for-profit firms were allowed to review the products instead of the FDA.

=== 21st Century Cures Act ===
The 21st Century Cures Act would allow for faster approval of certain drugs, which could result in additional recalls. It passed both houses of Congress and was signed into law by US President Barack Obama on December 13, 2016.

In 2015, 45 new drugs were passed by the FDA, which is more than double than the approval rate 10 years ago. The 21st Century Cures Act could make this number a trend rather than aberration by expediting approval through lower standards, much like the FDA Modernization Act of 1997. The rationale behind the act is that urgency trumps risk for "breakthrough" medical devices. The act would allow producers to submit data other than official clinical trials for consideration, such as case histories. It would also allow reviews to be done by third parties instead of the FDA. Debates stem from the fact that approval could be based on anecdotal rather than scientific evidence.

This act is debated due to the FDA's seemingly close relations with medical device producers. The two industries collaborated to write proposals for lobbying for the legislation of this act. The FDA is supposed to be neutral in its actions, but representatives from Johnson & Johnson, St Jude Medical, and CVRx Inc. (large medical device suppliers) were all in attendance for the collaborative meetings.

== See also ==
- List of withdrawn drugs
- Contamination control
