= Center for Food Safety and Applied Nutrition =

Branch of the US Food and Drug Administration

- CFSAN Logo

Agency overview
- Formed: 1984
- Jurisdiction: Federal government of the United States
- Headquarters: 5001 Campus Drive, College Park, Maryland 20740
- Employees: 811 Full-time Employees
- Annual budget: $182 million
- Agency executive: Nega Beru, Executive officer
- Parent agency: Food and Drug Administration
- Website: www.fda.gov/Food

The Center for Food Safety and Applied Nutrition (CFSAN (/ˈsɪfˌsæn/ SIF-san)) is the branch of the United States Food and Drug Administration (FDA) that regulates food, dietary supplements, and cosmetics, as opposed to drugs, biologics, medical devices, and radiological products, which also fall under the purview of the FDA.

== History ==
In October 2024, the FDA created Human Foods Program, this is the new agency that transitioned from CFSAN. Many of the responsibilities from those offices were handled by CFSAN were incorporated into the new program, such as preventing food-borne illness, reviewing the safety of chemicals that are used in food, and supporting policies related to diet-related health concerns. This change was intended to modernize how the agency oversees the U.S. Food supply and improve coordination across food safety.

Its history, regulatory responsibilities, major policies, and the transition to the Human Foods program reflect its long standing role in federal food regulation.

== Area of regulation ==
U.S. food laws give the FDA authority to regulate products that are legally considered food, and CFSAN was the FDA center at first but now it's Human Foods Program. Since, U.S law stated the term of "Food" which means anything used for food or drink for man or animals, as well as the ingredients they use to make it. This definition matters because it decides what products the FDA and Human foods programs can control and how different products are labeled. Once a product is considered food under the law, it has to follow federal rules for safety, manufacturing, and labeling. CFSAN had covered a wide range of products found in the marketplace. This included medical foods, dietary supplements, cosmetics, and many substances added during food production.

FDA enforces "standard identity," which set minimum requirements for certain foods to ensure consistency and protect consumers from misleading labeling. These rules help make products more consistent. The food regulatory decisions involve oversight of pricing practices such as "was/how" comparisons, saving claims, reference prices, limited-time promotions, and subscription disclosures that ensures companies use clearer and fair practices when selling to consumers.

"Food" within the context of FDA is a very broad term with some limitations. Products that contain meat are regulated by the U.S. Department of Agriculture's Food Safety and Inspection Service, with the exception of seafood and some exotic meats. The regulation of eggs is similarly complicated by shared responsibilities between the two agencies.

Many other federal and state agencies have some overlapping or conflicting requirements for regulation of food products. For example, the United States Environmental Protection Agency (EPA) regulates levels of allowable contaminants in public drinking water, where the FDA regulates bottled water.

Regulation of food also includes food additives such as preservatives and artificial sweeteners. Controversies over preservatives were very important in the early days of the FDA, where volunteers participated in experimental meals with high doses of the chemicals to determine their toxicity. Levels of undesirable food additives, such as methyl mercury in canned tuna, are the responsibility of the FDA.

FDA maintains a list of additives that are used in food in the United States as well as a list of additives generally recognized as safe (GRAS, pronounced grass). Products that contain ingredients that are not GRAS are usually dietary supplements (for example, many energy drinks contain stimulants which are not GRAS).

Food products may make health claims, such as the "Heart Healthy" labels on foods high in fiber. Each specific claim must be submitted and is based on the content of the food, it is not an approval of a specific product. Dietary supplements may make "structure or function" claims but cannot legally claim to cure or prevent disease unless they meet an approved health claim as a food product.

CFSAN is also responsible for food labeling, specifically the "Nutrition Facts" panel typically seen on packaged foods. Ingredient declarations are also required, and this is important for consumers with food allergies

Regulation of food includes evaluations of products which are used in food handling and storage, referred to as "food contact surfaces." Problems in this area include lead based glazes that are used to decorate ceramic dishes.

=== Areas of concern ===
- Biological Pathogens
- Dietary Supplements
- Toxic Metals
- Food Allergens
- Nutrient Concerns
- Pesticide residue
- Naturally occurring toxins
- Decomposition and Filth
- Dietary Components
- Radionuclides
- TSE-type diseases
- Product tampering

=== Definitions ===
Before any product that classifies as a food/drug/cosmetic enters our markets, the FDA tests it to make sure it's not "harmful" to consumers. The FDA's mission to be the shield of consumers against dangerous and harmful Food, Drug, or Cosmetic products.

Here is the definition directly from Section 1 . [21 U.S.C. 301] of the Federal Food, Drug, and Cosmetic Act.

- (f) 1 The term "food" means (1) articles used for food or drink for man or other animals, (2) chewing gum, and (3) articles used for components of any such article.
- (g)(1) The term "drug" means (A) articles recognized in the official United States Pharmacopeia, official Homoeopathic Pharmacopoeia of the United States, or official National Formulary, or any supplement to any of them; and (B) articles intended for use in the diagnosis, cure, mitigation, treatment, or prevention of disease in man or other animals; and (C) articles (other than food) intended to affect the structure or any function of the body of man or other animals; and (D) articles intended for use as a component of any article specified in clause (A), (B), or (C). A food or dietary supplement for which a claim, subject to sections 403(r)(1)(B) and 403(r)(3) or sections 403(r)(1)(B) and 403(r)(5)(D), is made in accordance with the requirements of section 403(r) is not a drug solely because the label or the labeling contains such a claim. A food, dietary ingredient, or dietary supplement for which a truthful and not misleading statement is made in accordance with section 403(r)(6) is not a drug under clause (C) solely because the label or the labeling contains such a statement. (2) The term "counterfeit drug" means a drug which, or the container or labeling of which, without authorization, bears the trademark, trade name, or other identifying mark, imprint, or device, or any likeness thereof, of a drug manufacturer, processor, packer, or distributor other than the person or persons who in fact manufactured, processed, packed, or distributed such drug and which thereby falsely purports or is represented to be the product of, or to have been packed or distributed by, such other drug manufacturer, processor, packer, or distributor.
- (i) The term "cosmetic" means (1) articles intended to be rubbed, poured, sprinkled, or sprayed on, introduced into, or otherwise applied to the human body or any part thereof for cleansing, beautifying, promoting attractiveness, or altering the appearance, and (2) articles intended for use as a component of any such articles; except that such term shall not include soap.

== History ==
The Center for Food Safety and Applied Nutrition is a member of one of the six product oriented centers that seeks to carry out the mission of the FDA. The CFSAN contributes to a nationwide field force centered on the ideals and motives of the FDA, under delegated power from the FDA.

The Center regulates approximately $240 billion worth of domestic food while simultaneously regulating $15 billion worth of imported foods and $15 billion worth of cosmetics sold domestically. The center controls domestically with approximately 50,000 food establishments and 3,500 cosmetic firms. The services of the center are trained and enhanced by the FDA.

Most of the power for the CFSAN stems from congressional power given to the FDA through Acts and Regulations. The power to enforce the Acts and Regulations is then delegated from the FDA to the CFSAN as well as the other 5 product oriented centers. The congressional power can be traced to various acts and regulations such as:

- Pure Food and Drug Act of 1906
- The Federal Import Milk Act (1927)
- The Federal Food Drug and Cosmetic Act of 1938
- The Public Health Service Act (1944)
- The Fair Packaging and Labeling Act (1966)
- The Infant Formula Act of 1980
- The Nutrition Labeling and Education Act of 1990
- The Dietary Supplement Health and Education Act of 1994

CFSAN has been criticized for its avoidance of major fights with the food industry, resulting in lack of adequate oversight on food safety. As of 2022, the number of food safety inspections has gone down in recent years. Congress places less scrutiny on CFSAN than the FDA's other divisions, reducing accountability.

== Structure and personnel ==
=== Structure ===
In 1992 the organization evaluated its structure and concluded that its 20-year-old configuration was insufficient to provide proper service in current times. New legislative and budgetary obstacles also fueled the need for change. In response to all of this, the food program joined together its once disconnected scientific and regulatory policies. Rather than being a rigidly centralized organization they separated their various tasks and assigned each to a designated office. Strategic managers assigned issues facing multiple offices at once, while each office is headed by an Office Manager. This allows adequate management on both macro and micro scales.

A change in the Trump administration resulted in both the director of CFSAN and the FDA's Deputy Commissioner for Food Policy and Response both reporting to the agency's Commissioner, resulting in bureaucratic friction and structural dysfunction.

=== Organization ===
- Office of Analytics and Outreach
- Office of Food Safety
- Office of Cosmetics and Colors
- Office of Dietary Supplement Programs
- Office of Regulatory Science
- Office of Food Additive Safety
- Office of Compliance
- Office of Applied Research & Safety Assessment
- Office of Regulations & Policy
- Office of Nutrition and Food Labelling
- Office of Executive Programs
- Office of Coordinated Outbreak Response & Evaluation Network

=== Personnel ===
- Executive Officer: Thomas D. Williams, M.B.A
- Deputy Director: Charles Sabatos
- Safety Management Staff: Jim Zelinsky
- Division of Planning and Financial Resources Management: Grover G. Heiman III
- Division of Program Services Director: Charles Sabatos (Temporary)

==== Past directors ====
- Fred R. Shank, Ph.D.
- Joseph A. Levitt
- Robert E. Brackett, Ph.D.

The Center for Food Safety and Applied Nutrition has over 800 employees with a wide range of job titles. From secretary to molecular chemist, the Center has an extensive staff that covers every possible aspect of food and nutrition science. In the past, most of the Center's work force was stationed at their headquarters in Washington, D.C., but in 2001 most of the headquarters staff was moved to its new location in College Park, Maryland.

==== Mission statement ====
CFSAN's mission statement reads "CFSAN, in conjunction with the Agency's field staff, is responsible for promoting and protecting the public's health by ensuring that the nation's food supply is safe, sanitary, wholesome, and honestly labeled, and that cosmetic products are safe and properly labeled."

== Important regulations established ==
The Center for Food Safety and Applied Nutrition or CFSAN imposes regulations mainly on corporate entities that create and market foods and drugs. These regulations usually have to deal with products in the pipeline for introduction into the American market. Here is an abbreviated list from the linked page that highlights the most important and influential actions regulation created by the FDA. It also deals with the expansion of the FDA's powers and the creation of the agency itself.

- 1906- The original Food and Drug act is passed that mandates strict health safety and testing policies be established mostly in response to the recently publicized meat packing plant scandals, as well as poisonous ingredients that were being added to other products for preservation and "health benefits". The act was a huge step forward in the overall health and safety of the consumer, and laid the groundwork for future consumer advocate success.
- 1912- The Shirley Amendment is passes that effectively prohibits false advertising of therapeutic benefits from the use of food/dietary supplement products
- 1958- Food additives Act passed that required companies to predetermine safety of additives and submit them to the FDA for testing
- 1990- Nutrition Labeling and Education Act- establishes the modern guidelines for nutritional labeling and inspection
- 2004- Food allergy Labeling act requires companies to label foods with peanuts, soybeans, cows milk, eggs, fish, tree nuts, wheat, and shellfish
- 2011 - Food Safety Modernization Act (Pub. L. 111–353 (text) (PDF))

CFSAN issued Redbook 2000 in 2000 (with updates through 2007), formally titled Toxicological Principles for the Safety Assessment of Food Ingredients, a non-binding guidance document for conducting toxicological studies to evaluate the safety of direct food additives, color additives, and related ingredients used in food products.

CFSAN publishes the "Bad Bug Book", which provides information about the microorganisms that cause foodborne illness.

== Organizations that influence CFSAN ==
There are two main research groups outside the FDA that have a direct impact on the CFSAN: the Joint Institute for Food Safety and Applied Nutrition, and the National Center for Food Safety and Technology. In addition, there are many interest groups who have a stake in CFSAN's policies.

The Joint Institute for Food Safety and Applied Nutrition (JIFSAN) is a partnership between the FDA (specifically, the CFSAN and Center for Veterinary Medicine (CVM)) and the University of Maryland. JIFSAN was created in 1996 to "provide the scientific basis for ensuring a safe, wholesome food supply as well as provide the infrastructure for contributions to national food safety programs and international food standards." Currently JIFSAN is working on such research as Risk Analysis, Microbial Pathogens and Toxins, Food Composition and Applied Nutrition, and Animal Health Sciences and Food Safety.

The Institute for Food Safety and Health, or IFSH (formerly National Center for Food Safety and Technology) is a research group between CFSAN, the Illinois Institute of Technology (IIT) and members of the food industry. IFSH is "a world-class food science research institute that produces knowledge-based outcomes in the areas of food safety, food defense, and nutrition for stakeholders in government, industry, and academia."

Because CFSAN regulates food safety and labeling, many food industry groups have an interest in their policies. Some of these groups include:

- American Feed Industry Association
- The Association of Food & Drug Officials
- Food Marketing Institute
- Institute of Food Technologists
- National Chicken Council
- National Pork Board
- National Turkey Federation
- United Fresh Fruit and Vegetable Association

CFSAN is also a partner in the Partnership for Food Safety Education (PFSE), an organization dedicated to educating the public about food safety. The PFSE comprises some federal agencies, such as the CDC and the EPA, with many members from the food industry.

== See also ==
- Food and Drug Administration
- Food Safety and Inspection Service
