= ClinicalTrials.gov =

US government registry of clinical trials

Agency overview
- Headquarters: Bethesda, Maryland, U.S.
- Agency executive: Rebecca J. Williams, Director
- Website: ClinicalTrials.gov

ClinicalTrials.gov is a registry of clinical trials. It is run by the United States National Library of Medicine (NLM) at the National Institutes of Health, and holds registrations from over 444,000 trials from 221 countries.

== History ==
As a result of pressure from HIV-infected men in the gay community, who demanded better access to clinical trials, the U.S. Congress passed the Health Omnibus Programs Extension Act of 1988 (Public Law 100-607) which mandated the development of a database of AIDS Clinical Trials Information Services (ACTIS). This effort served as an example of what might be done to improve public access to clinical trials, and motivated other disease-related interest groups to push for something similar for all diseases.

The Food and Drug Administration Modernization Act of 1997 (Public Act 105-115) amended the Food, Drug and Cosmetic Act and the Public Health Service Act to require that the NIH create and operate a public information resource, which came to be called ClinicalTrials.gov, tracking drug efficacy studies resulting from approved Investigational New Drug (IND) applications (FDA Regulations 21 CFR Parts 312 and 812). With the primary purpose of improving access of the public to clinical trials where individuals with serious diseases and conditions might find experimental treatments, this law required information about:

1. Federally and privately funded clinical trials;
2. The purpose of each experimental drug;
3. Subject eligibility criteria to participate in the clinical trial;
4. The location of clinical trial sites being used for a study; and
5. A point of contact for patients interested in enrolling in the trial.

The National Library of Medicine in the National Institutes of Health made ClinicalTrials.gov available to the public via the internet on February 29, 2000. In this initial release, ClinicalTrials.gov primarily included information about NIH-sponsored trials, omitting the majority of clinical trials being performed by private industry. On March 29, 2000 the FDA issued a Draft Guidance called Information Program on Clinical Trials for Serious or Life-Threatening Diseases: Establishment of a Data Bank and put into In) with the hope that this would increase use by industry. After a second draft guidance was released in June 2001, a final guidance was issued on March 18, 2002 titled "Guidance for Industry Information Program on Clinical Trials for Serious or Life-Threatening Diseases and Conditions". The Best Pharmaceuticals for Children Act of 2004 (Public Law 107-109) amended the Public Health Service Act to require that additional information be included in ClinicalTrials.gov.

As the result of toxicity tracking concerns raised following retraction of several drugs from the prescription market, ClinicalTrials.gov was further reinforced by the Food and Drug Administration Amendments Act of 2007 (U.S. Public Law 110-85) which mandated the expansion of ClinicalTrials.gov for better tracking of the basic results of clinical trials, requiring:

- Data elements that facilitate disclosure, as required by the FDAAA, as well as operations of ClinicalTrials.gov; and
- "Basic results" reporting.

=== Timeline ===
November 21, 1997 The Food and Drug Administration Modernization Act of 1997 mandates a clinical trials registry
February 29, 2000 ClinicalTrials.gov comes online
September 16, 2004 ICMJE recommendations mandate that research journals exclude outcomes from non-registered trials
September 27, 2007 Food and Drug Administration Amendments Act of 2007 section 801 mandates registration and penalty for noncompliance
September 27, 2008 reporting results is mandatory
September 27, 2009 reporting adverse events is mandatory

=== Later Developments ===
In a 2009 meeting of the National Institutes of Health speakers said that one of the goals was to have more clearly defined and consistent standards for reporting. As of March 2015, the NIH was still considering the details of this rule change.

A study of trials conducted between 2008 and 2012 found that about half of those required to be reported had not been. A 2014 study of pre-2009 trials found that many had serious discrepancies between what was reported on clinicaltrials.gov versus the peer-reviewed journal articles reporting the same studies.

== Content ==
=== Trial record life-cycle ===
The trial typically goes through stages of: initial registration, ongoing record updates, and basic summary result submission. Each trial record is administered by a trial record manager. A trial record manager typically provides initial trial registration prior to the study enrolling the first participant. This also facilitates informing potential participants that the trial is no longer recruiting participants. Once all participants were recruited, the trial record may be updated to indicate that is closed to recruitment. Once all measurements are collected (the trial formally completes), the trial status is updated to 'complete'. If the trial terminates for some reason (e.g., lack of enrollment, evidence of initial adverse outcomes), the status may be updated to 'terminated'. Once final trial results are known or legal deadlines are met, the trial record manager may upload basic summary results to the registry either by filling a complex web-based form or submitting a compliant XML file.

=== Search ===
==== Standard Search ====
To search in ClinicalTrials.gov, users filter by All Studies, or select a certain phase in the study's recruitment. Then the user enters a search keyword or phrase into at least one of the provided search fields. Next, the user clicks the Search button, and results populate according to the user's input.

== Data sources ==
The database for Aggregate Analysis of ClinicalTrials.gov (AACT) is a publicly available source based on the data in ClinicalTrials.gov. It was designed to facilitate aggregate analysis by normalizing some of the metadata across trials.

== Relationship to PubMed ==
PubMed is another resource managed by the National Library of Medicine. A trial with an NCT identification number that is registered in ClinicalTrials.gov can be linked to a journal article with a PubMed identification number (PMID). Such link is created either by the author of the journal article by mentioning the trial ID in the abstract (abstract trial-article link) or by the trial record manager when the registry record is updated with a PMID of an article that reports trial results (registry trial-article link). A 2013 study analyzing 8907 interventional trials registered in ClinicalTrials.gov found that 23.2% of trials had abstract-linked result articles and 7.3% of trials had registry-linked articles. 2.7% of trials had both types of links. Most trials are linked to a single result article (76.4%). The study also found that 72.2% of trials had no formal linked result article.

== See also ==
- Academic clinical trials
- Bioethics
- CIOMS Guidelines
- Clinical data acquisition
- Clinical Data Interchange Standards Consortium
- Clinical trials registry
- Community-based clinical trial
- Contract Research Organization
- Data Monitoring Committees
- Drug development
- Drug recall
- Electronic Common Technical Document
- Ethical problems using children in clinical trials
- EudraCT
- European Medicines Agency
- FDA Special Protocol Assessment
- International Clinical Trials Registry Platform
- Investigational Device Exemption
- Medical ethics
- Nocebo
- Randomized controlled trial
- Trials
- World Medical Association
