= Bedford Park, Illinois =

- Village
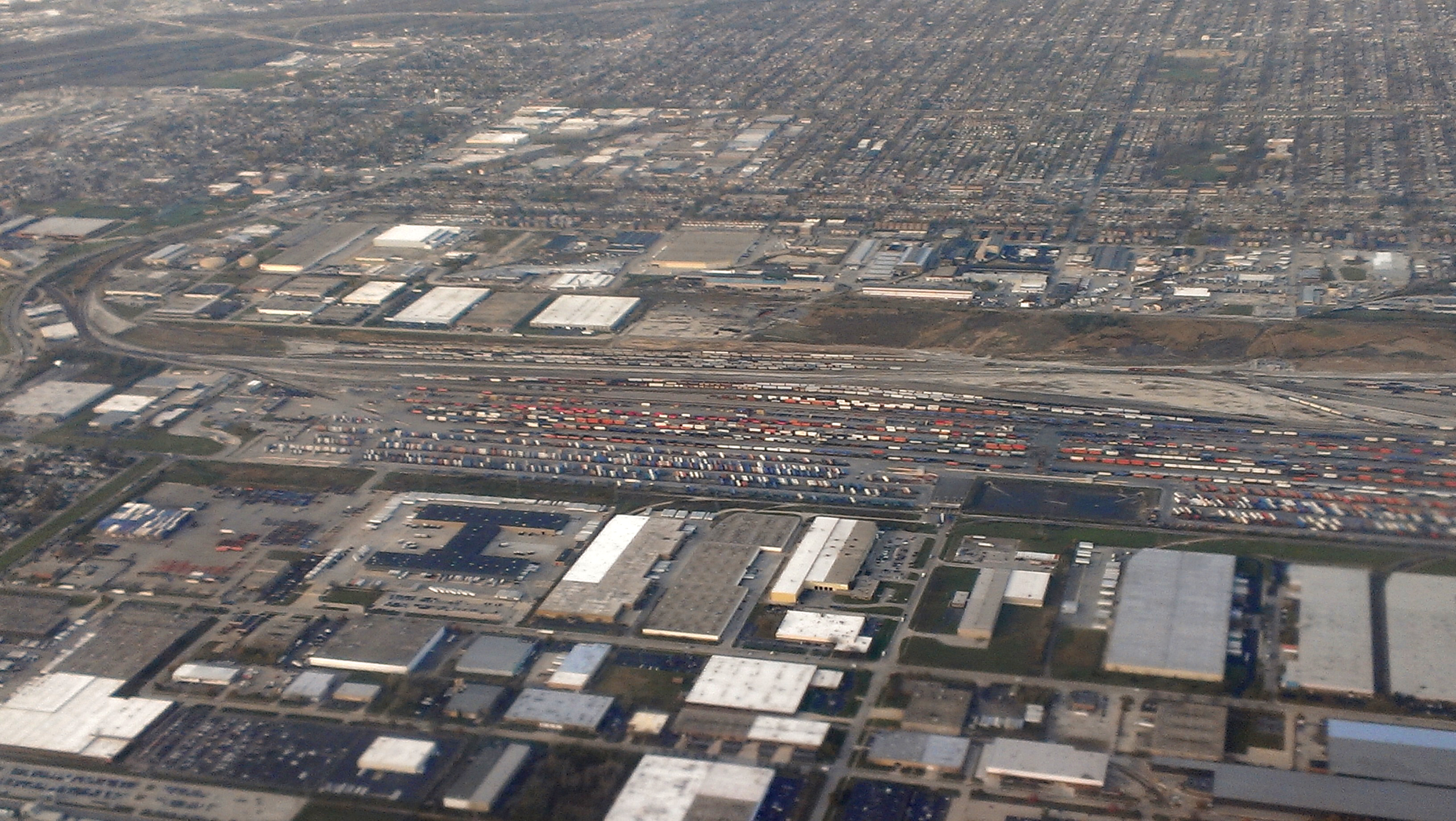
- Clearing Yard and the surrounding industrial area in Bedford Park

- Flag Seal

- Location of Bedford Park in Cook County, Illinois.

- Location within Greater Chicago Location within Illinois Location within the United States
- Coordinates: 41°45′9″N 87°47′9″W
- Country: United States
- State: Illinois
- County: Cook
- Township: Lyons, Stickney
- Incorporated: 1940

Government
  - Type: Council–manager
  - President: David R. Brady

Area
  - Total: 6.04 sq mi (15.64 km^{2})
  - Land: 5.93 sq mi (15.37 km^{2})
  - Water: 0.10 sq mi (0.27 km^{2}) 1.82%

Population (2020)
  - Total: 602
  - Density: 101.4/sq mi (39.17/km^{2})
- Up 1.04% from 2000

Standard of living (2007-11)
  - Per capita income: $23,925
  - Median home value: $218,900
- ZIP codes: 60455, 60458, 60459, 60499, 60501, 60638
- Area code(s): 708, 773
- Geocode: 04572
- FIPS code: 17-04572
- Website: www.villageofbedfordpark.com

Demographics (2010)
Demographic	Proportion
White	83.8%
Black	0.7%
Asian	0.0%
Islander	0.0%
Native	0.3%
Other	15.1%
Hispanic (any race)	24.3%

Bedford Park is a village in Cook County, Illinois, United States, and is an industrial suburb of Chicago. The population was 602 at the 2020 census. Bedford Park consists of a small residential area and vast amounts of heavy industry sprawling to the east and a small amount to the west.

== Geography ==
According to the 2021 census gazetteer files, Bedford Park has a total area of 6.04 square miles (15.64 km^{2}), of which 5.93 square miles (15.36 km^{2}) (or 98.25%) is land and 0.11 square miles (0.28 km^{2}) (or 1.75%) is water.

== Demographics ==
Historical population
Census	Pop.	Note	%±
1950	651		—
1960	737		13.2%
1970	583		−20.9%
1980	988		69.5%
1990	566		−42.7%
2000	574		1.4%
2010	580		1.0%
2020	602		3.8%
U.S. Decennial Census

=== 2020 census ===
Bedford Park village, Illinois – Racial and ethnic composition Note: the US Census treats Hispanic/Latino as an ethnic category. This table excludes Latinos from the racial categories and assigns them to a separate category. Hispanics/Latinos may be of any race.
Race / Ethnicity (NH = Non-Hispanic)	Pop 2000	Pop 2010	Pop 2020	% 2000	% 2010	% 2020
White alone (NH)	522	428	332	90.94%	73.79%	55.15%
Black or African American alone (NH)	6	4	15	1.05%	0.69%	2.49%
Native American or Alaska Native alone (NH)	1	2	1	0.17%	0.34%	0.17%
Asian alone (NH)	1	0	10	0.17%	0.00%	1.66%
Pacific Islander alone (NH)	0	0	1	0.00%	0.00%	0.17%
Other race alone (NH)	0	0	0	0.00%	0.00%	0.00%
Mixed race or Multiracial (NH)	6	5	21	1.05%	0.86%	3.49%
Hispanic or Latino (any race)	38	141	222	6.62%	24.31%	36.88%
Total	574	580	602	100.00%	100.00%	100.00%

As of the 2020 census there were 602 people, 211 households, and 166 families residing in the village. The population density was 99.67 inhabitants per square mile (38.48/km^{2}). There were 213 housing units at an average density of 35.26 per square mile (13.61/km^{2}). The racial makeup of the village was 61.30% White, 2.82% African American, 0.33% Native American, 1.66% Asian, 0.17% Pacific Islander, 13.62% from other races, and 20.10% from two or more races. Hispanic or Latino of any race were 36.88% of the population.

The top ancestries reported were Polish (16.1%), Irish (12.4%), German (9.7%), and Italian (6.7%).

There were 211 households, out of which 36.5% had children under the age of 18 living with them, 60.66% were married couples living together, 15.64% had a female householder with no husband present, and 21.33% were non-families. 17.06% of all households were made up of individuals, and 6.64% had someone living alone who was 65 years of age or older. The average household size was 3.63 and the average family size was 3.17.

The village's age distribution consisted of 26.5% under the age of 18, 7.8% from 18 to 24, 23.9% from 25 to 44, 27.5% from 45 to 64, and 14.3% who were 65 years of age or older. The median age was 37.4 years. For every 100 females, there were 136.4 males. For every 100 females age 18 and over, there were 113.9 males.

The median income for a household in the village was $99,375, and the median income for a family was $99,500. Males had a median income of $47,083 versus $47,700 for females. The per capita income for the village was $37,871. About 4.2% of families and 3.7% of the population were below the poverty line, including 5.1% of those under age 18 and 0.0% of those age 65 or over.

== Government ==
Bedford Park is in Illinois's 6th congressional district.

== Education ==
Elementary and middle school students attend school in Cook County School District 104, which operates Walker Elementary School in Bedford Park. High school students move on to Argo Community High School District 217 in Summit.

The Bedford Park Public Library is in the community.

== Parks and recreation ==
The Bedford Park District operates public parks in Bedford Park and Bridgeview Gardens.

== Business ==
The Institute for Food Safety and Health is located in Bedford Park, adjacent to the Ingredion plant. It is affiliated with the Illinois Institute of Technology and the Food and Drug Administration's Center for Food Safety and Applied Nutrition.

== Transportation ==
Pace provides bus service in the village.
