= Consortium =

Association of two or more individuals and/or organizations to achieve a common goal

A consortium (pl. consortiums or consortia) is an association of two or more individuals, companies, organizations, or governments (or any combination of these entities) with the objective of participating in a common activity or pooling their resources for achieving a common goal. Consortia are generally nonprofit with a goal to help its members improve their competitiveness in the specific field.

Consortium is a Latin word meaning "partnership", "association", or "society", and derives from consors ("shared in property"), itself from con- ("together") and sors ("fate").

== Examples ==
=== Educational ===
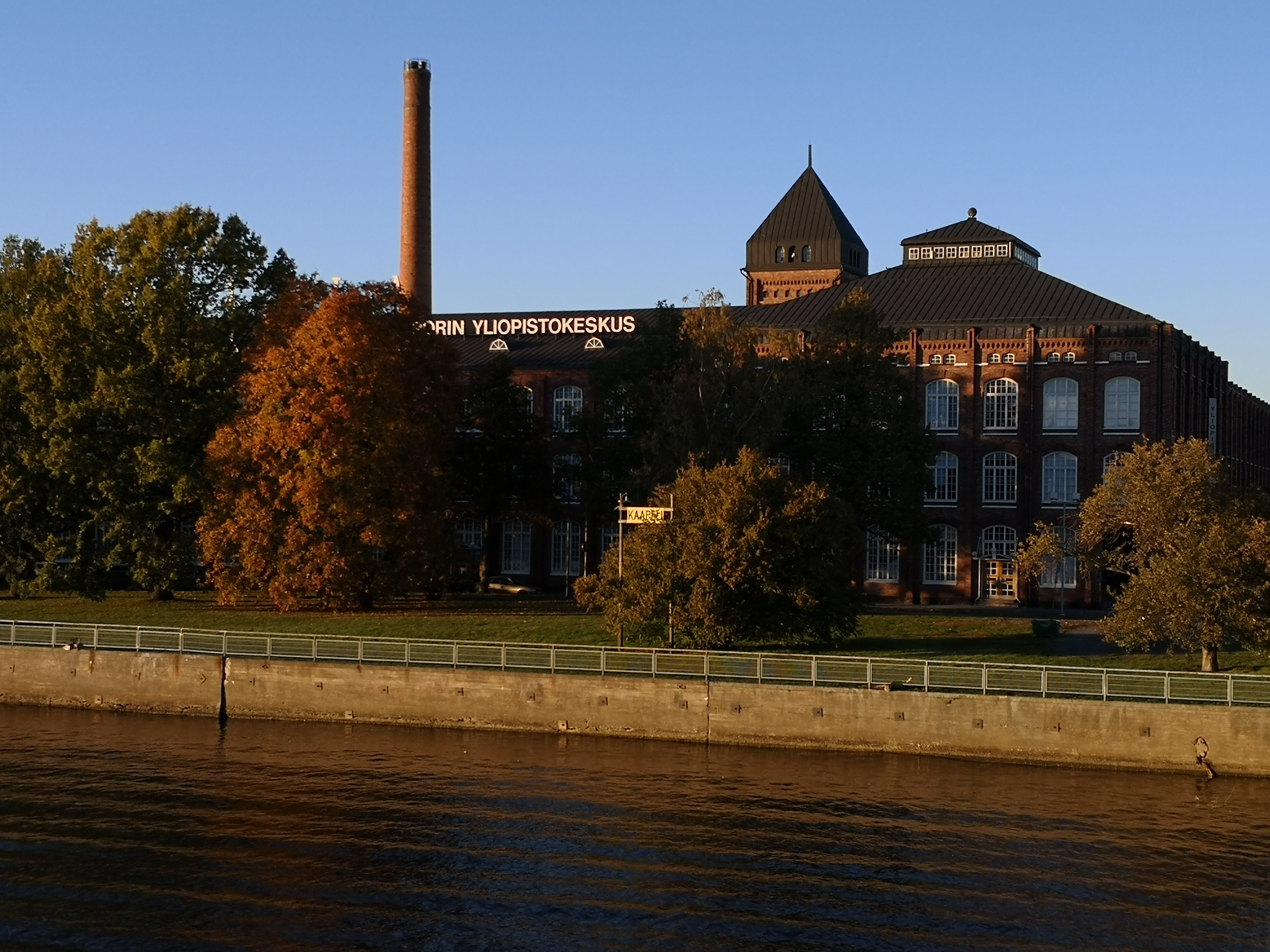
The University Consortium of Pori in its early October evening glory in Pori, Finland

Consortiums among universities are established to share research laboratories and equipment facilities, exchange faculty and students, provide programs abroad, and form specialized research centers and admissions offices. Generally, it includes a corporate identity, voluntary membership of institutions, its own staff and budgetary autonomy. This type of consortium aims to facilitate the educational process and research by more effectively allocating and conserving limited resources of money, staff, and facilities, identifying specialized areas of teaching and research in which cooperative deals would be alluring.

Two types of high education consortia are generally realized, the "association" and the "center". The "association" refers to colleges and universities of similar nature and purpose; the "center" type brings together dissimilar institutions: smaller colleges around a large university.

Some example academic consortia are; Big Ten Academic Alliance in the Midwest and Mid-Atlantic U.S., Claremont Colleges consortium in Southern California, Five College Consortium in Massachusetts, and Consórcio Nacional Honda.

The Big Ten Academic Alliance, formerly known as the Committee on Institutional Cooperation, includes the members of the Big Ten athletic conference. The participants in Five Colleges, Inc. are: Amherst College, Hampshire College, Mount Holyoke College, Smith College, and the University of Massachusetts Amherst. Another example of a successful consortium is the Five Colleges of Ohio: Oberlin College, Ohio Wesleyan University, Kenyon College, College of Wooster and Denison University. The aforementioned Claremont Consortium (known as the Claremont Colleges) consists of Pomona College, Claremont Graduate University, Scripps College, Claremont McKenna College, Harvey Mudd College, Pitzer College, and Keck Graduate Institute. These consortia have pooled the resources of their member colleges and the universities to share human and material assets as well as to link academic and administrative resources.

An example of a non-profit consortium is the Appalachian College Association (ACA) located in Richmond, Kentucky. The association consists of 35 private liberal arts colleges and universities spread across the central Appalachian mountains in Kentucky, North Carolina, Tennessee, Virginia, and West Virginia. Collectively these higher education institutions serve approximately 42,500 students. Six research universities in the region (University of Kentucky, University of North Carolina, University of Tennessee, West Virginia University, University of Virginia, and Virginia Tech) are affiliated with the ACA. These institutions assist the ACA in reviewing grant and fellowship applications, conducting workshops, and providing technical assistance. The ACA works to serve higher education in the rural regions of these five states.

=== Commercial ===
An example of a for-profit consortium is a group of banks that collaborate to make a loan—also known as a syndicate. This type of loan is more commonly known as a syndicated loan. In England, it is common for a consortium to buy out financially struggling football clubs in order to keep them out of liquidation.

Alyeska Pipeline Service Company, the company that built the Trans-Alaska Pipeline System in the 1970s, initially was a consortium of BP, ARCO, ConocoPhillips, Exxon, Mobil, Unocal, and Koch Alaska Pipeline Company.

=== Aerospace ===
==== Airbus example ====
Airbus Industries was formed in 1970 as a consortium of aerospace manufacturers. The retention of production and engineering assets by the partner companies in effect made Airbus Industries a sales and marketing company. This arrangement led to inefficiencies due to the inherent conflicts of interest that the four partner companies faced; they were both shareholders of, and subcontractors to, the consortium. The companies collaborated on development of the Airbus range, but guarded the financial details of their own production activities and sought to maximize the transfer prices of their sub-assemblies.

In 2001, EADS (created by the merger of French, German and Spanish Airbus partner companies) and BAE Systems (the British partner company) transferred their Airbus production assets to a new company, Airbus SAS. In return, they got 80% and 20% shares respectively. BAE would later sell its share to EADS.

=== Coopetition ===
Coopetition, deriving from a portmanteau of cooperation and competition, is the word used when companies that are otherwise competitors collaborate in a consortium to cooperate on areas non-strategic for their core businesses. They prefer to reduce their costs on these non-strategic areas and compete on other areas where they can differentiate better.

For example, the GENIVI Alliance, now called COVESA, is a not-for-profit consortium between different car makers in order to ease building an In-Vehicle Infotainment system.

Another example is the World Wide Web Consortium (W3C), which is a consortium that standardizes web technologies like HTML, XML and CSS.

=== Government, academia and industry ===
The Institute for Food Safety and Health is a consortium consisting of the Illinois Institute of Technology, the Food and Drug Administration's Center for Food Safety and Applied Nutrition, and members of the food industry. Some of the work done at the institute includes, "assessment and validation of new and novel food safety and preservation technologies, processing and packaging systems, microbiological and chemical methods, health promoting food components, and risk management strategies".

=== Consortium for installment-based purchases ===
Commonly known in the United States as a rotating savings and credit association (ROSCA) and also called Savings Clubs, Christmas clubs, sousou or even money circles, they are typically informal associations of people saving money together with a commonly shared goal: buying something with the same value. In this association its members contribute by paying equal amount installments (usually monthly or weekly) towards a common fund. On every installment the common fund reaches the goal value and someone is awarded this sum and from this point forward this person own the association the remaining amount, just as in a loan. This process repeats until every member is awarded the entire sum.

These informal associations are specially popular among immigrants since they are a cheaper alternative to traditional financing and usually require no formal papers, credit history or even a bank account.

Outside the United States, these savings clubs can be formal and have proper legislation. In some countries, like Brazil, consórcios are an integral part of the traditional banking system, where there are clubs for purchasing real estate and cars, and even for plastic surgery costs. Over seven million people have engaged in these formal savings associations over the past years, adding to over U$10 billion in credit. Since these clubs have up to thousands of members, products purchased are awarded through lottery and bidding processes and the common fund administrators charge a fixed fee in order to take responsibility and guarantee the integrity of the process.

== Legal nature of the consortium agreement in selected countries ==
=== France ===
In France, the consortium, considered a sub-type of joint venture, has important theoretical and practical significance. The French legal system does not provide a definition and does not explicitly use the concept of a joint venture or consortium (groupements momentanés d'entreprises). The consortium agreement in France is a purely contractual cooperative contract that does not entail the creation of a third party. The consortium has no legal personality or legal capacity. The contract is concluded between two or more natural or legal persons who undertake to carry out certain works in order to implement a joint project which consortium members would not be able to carry out themselves. The consortium agreement is not explicitly regulated by the French legislator, but it is admissible in the light of the principle of freedom of contract interpreted from articles 6 and 1134 of the French Civil Code.

=== United Kingdom ===
Neither consortium nor joint venture have a legal definition in U.K. law. The second term is usually used to describe various types of agreements where two or more parties cooperate in conducting business activities. This manifests e.g. in the joint distribution of profit, sharing cash, assets, knowledge or abilities. As there are no legal provisions regulating in detail the consortium or joint venture, the relations between the parties participating in this type of agreement—when choosing a joint venture as a collaboration agreement or a special partnership—are subject to common law or the provisions of the partnership law. A consortium agreement governed by the general law of contract, similar to an ordinary partnership agreement, does not create a separate entity.

=== Germany ===
In Germany the view prevails that the consortium is a type of internal civil law partnership (§ 705–740 of the BGB). In external relations, consortium members may decide on joint and several liability regulated by § 421 BGB, while internally there is sometimes a release from this liability. Joint ventures often include credit syndicates (Kreditkonsortien), securities issuing consortia, including mainly shares (Emissionskonsortien), construction consortia (Baukonsortien) also referred to as investment (Investitionskonsortien) and profit pools (Ergebnispools). Sometimes, special purpose partnerships established to jointly use construction facilities (Planungsgesellschaften) are listed in one category with the consortium and the pool. Cooperation agreements concluded under German law are not of a uniform legal nature. There is a great wealth of legal forms of cooperation that could be cautiously qualified as consortium agreements. This is in particular a civil law partnership in its internal and occasional variants (Gelegenheitsgesellschaft), as well as a partnership of building contractors (ARGE) and a structure simply referred to as the "consortium".

=== Italy ===
In Italy, a consortium is governed by the Italian Civil Code. The Civil Code (also known as the "Civil Code of 1942") in Italy is a body of civil law provisions and general procedural law rules and criminal rules. The code currently in force was issued with the Royal Decree of 16 March 1942, no. 262.

In particular:

- art 862: Land reclamation consortia
- art 863: Land improvement consortia
- art 2602: Consortia for the coordination of production and trade
- art 2612: Consortia with external activity
- art 2616: Mandatory consortia, including those for the storage of agricultural products

=== Poland ===
In the Polish legal system, the legal nature of the consortium agreement is disputed. According to the prevailing approach, a consortium is a form of cooperation, different from a civil law partnership, undertaken between economically independent entities already operating on the market in order to implement a specific undertaking that is a segment of the regular activities of these entities, based on an unnamed contract and characterized by a temporary nature, minimization of institutionalization, and lack of separate property, the need to specify how the parties participate in the joint venture and the intention not to establish a "community" with partly own interests (the partnership as such). According to this concept, despite the very broad formula of a civil partnership provided for entities that undertake to cooperate in a designated way to achieve a common economic goal (which is a common element for both types of contracts), the partnership contract do not exhaust all forms of cooperation and automatic qualification of consortium contracts as partnerships is not allowed.

== See also ==
- Joint venture
- Trade association
