= Institute for Food Safety and Health =

American research consortium

- Motto: "Innovation through Collaboration."
- Established: 2011
- Field of research: Food safety; Nutrition science
- Director: Brian T. Schaneberg, PhD
- Location: Bedford Park, Illinois, United States
- ZIP code: 60501
- Affiliations: Center for Food Safety and Applied Nutrition; Illinois Institute of Technology; Food and Drug Administration
- Operating agency: Illinois Institute of Technology; Food and Drug Administration
- Website: www.ifsh.iit.edu

The Institute for Food Safety and Health (IFSH) is a research consortium consisting of the United States Food and Drug Administration's Center for Food Safety and Applied Nutrition (FDA CFSAN), Illinois Institute of Technology (IIT) and the food industry. Under the cooperative agreement, the Institute was established by IIT to bring together the food safety and technology expertise of academia, industry and government as a consortium in the common goal of enhancing and improving the safety of food for U.S. consumers.

== History ==
The Institute was established as the National Center for Food Safety and Technology (NCFST) in 1988 with a $6.9 million donation of seven buildings and grounds by Corn Products International to IIT in 1988, located in the IIT Moffett Campus. The Moffett Technical Center consists of office, laboratory and pilot plant space located in Bedford Park, Illinois, in the near west suburbs of Chicago. It was built in 1948-49 and named in honor of George M. Moffett, then-president of Corn Products Refining Co.

The main building features bas relief murals created by architectural sculptor Lee Lawrie, who is best known for the Atlas statue in front of New York City's Rockefeller Center. The panels depict various scenes of the history of corn and corn production in the Americas, including a buffalo hunt showing primitive corn grass, Native Americans cultivating and harvesting corn, and American corn milling and processing. One panel, labeled "Argo", appears to be symbolic of the Moffett Technical Center itself, showing an engineer working in the pilot plant, a chemist with retorts and test tubes, and a scientist at a microscope.

In 2011, the NCFST was rebranded as the Institute for Food Safety and Health. The NCFST now operates as a center within the institute, along with new platforms such as the Center for Nutrition Research, Center for Processing Innovation, and the Center for Specialty Programs. IFSH has FDA personnel, IIT faculty and students, and has worked with more than 50 food industry-related partner companies." The institute is currently located in Bedford Park, Illinois.

The IFSH facilities consist of GMP food processing pilot plant & kitchen suite, BSL-2 food processing innovation laboratory, BSL-3 biocontainment pilot plant & laboratory, molecular microbiology laboratories, proficiency testing laboratories, applied chemistry laboratory, analytical chemistry laboratory, clinical nutrition research center, nutrition & biochemistry laboratories, novel food processing bay, thermal food processing laboratories, high pressure processing laboratories, protein & allergens laboratories, food packaging laboratories, high-throughput sequencing laboratory,food microbiology, food chemistry and packaging, and food process engineering.

The Department of Food Science and Nutrition offers certification in several topics, a doctorate degree, and master's degrees.
