= Produce Marketing Association =

- Founded: 1949; 77 years ago
- Defunct: January 2022, 01; 4 years ago
- Fate: Merged with United Fresh Produce Association to become International Fresh Produce Association
- Services: Floral industry, Trade organization

The Produce Marketing Association (PMA) is a global trade association whose 2200 members represent the full supply chain of the produce and mass-market floral industry, from seed producer to supermarket or foodservice outlet. It was founded in 1949. Cathy Burns serves as the current CEO. PMA sponsors an annual convention and exposition called Fresh Summit.

PMA has 2,900-member companies in 54 countries. The company focuses on the following member needs: Demand Creation, Global Connections, Science & Technology, Industry Talent and Sustainability.

== History ==
Formed in 1949 during the inaugural National Conference on Prepackaging, PMA (then Produce Prepackaging Association) was led by Paul B. Dickman and aimed to revolutionize the produce industry by delivering member networking and educational opportunities.

In 1958, official headquarters moved from New York to Newark, Delaware, with Robert Carey as Executive Secretary. This marks a turning point for the organization.

The organization officially changed its name to Produce Marketing Association in 1970. This is when PMA created three operating divisions to address increasing member demand for services: retailer, producer, and distributor.

In 1974, PMA joined the floral industry by forming the Floral Marketing Division to represent mass-market floral members.

The Produce Electronic Identification Board (PEIB) was created by PMA in 1987 to administer standardized Price Look-Up (PLU) codes. The following year, in 1988, PMA joined with United Fresh & Vegetable Association to establish the Center for Produce Quality.

In 1989, Bob Carey became President of PMA after three decades of service to the association.

PMA.com was launched in 1995, establishing the association as an online destination for produce industry members. By taking advantage of new communications technologies to connect to members worldwide, the association could now provide 24-hour access to information and create a virtual trade show.

In 1996, Bryan Silbermann succeeded Bob Carey as president and CEO. During his time with PMA Bryan Silbermann helped standardize PLU/UPC codes, spearheaded the Produce Traceability Initiative (PTI), began the import-export committee that became the International Trade Committee to Global Strategy and Development committees. Silbermann also helped institute the Produce for Better Health (PBH) program, FNV, Center for Produce Quality, Center for Produce Safety and Partnership for Food Safety Education, along with many other achievements during his time with PMA.

In 2017, Cathy Burns succeeded Bryan Silbermann as PMA's CEO.

== Programs and initiatives ==
PMA initiated the Pack Family/Career Pathways Program in 2004, which would later be renamed the Center for Growing Talent.

In 2021, it was announced that the Produce Marketing Association (PMA) and United Fresh Produce Association (United Fresh) reached an agreement to under the name of the International Fresh Produce Association.
