= Driscoll's =

American fruit producer

Driscoll's, Inc.
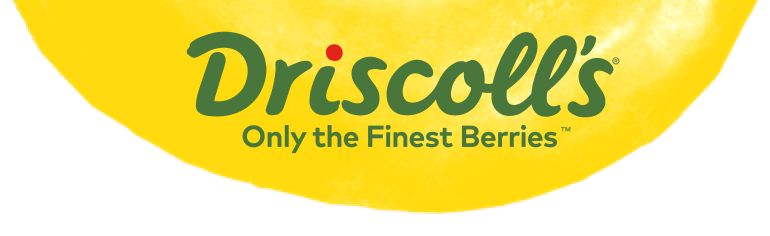

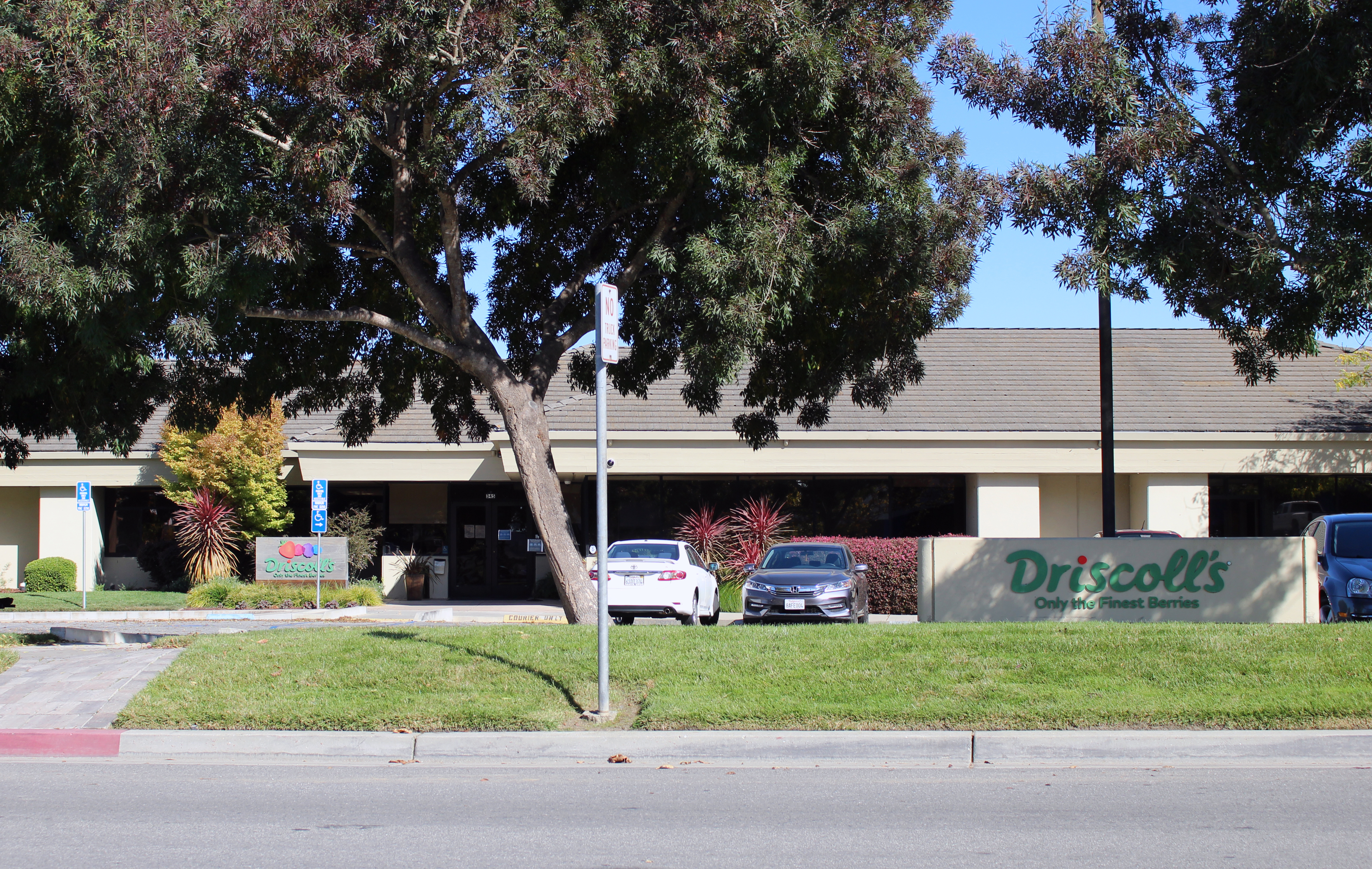
- Headquarters in Watsonville, California
- Type: Private
- Industry: Consumer products; Agricultural producers
- Founded: 1904; 122 years ago, as Banner Berry Farm's Brand
- Founders: Dick Driscoll; Ed Reiter
- Headquarters: Watsonville, California, US
- Key people: Miles Reiter (chairman); Brie Reiter Smith (CEO)
- Products: Strawberries; raspberries; blackberries; blueberries
- Website: driscolls.com

Driscoll's, Inc. is a California-based seller of fresh strawberries and other berries. It is a fourth-generation family business that has been in the Reiter and Driscoll families since the late 1800s. In 2017, it controlled roughly one-third of the $6 billion U.S. berry market, and is the world's largest berry company as of 2024. Headquartered in Watsonville, California, Driscoll's develops proprietary breeds of berries and then licenses them exclusively through approved growers.

== History ==
=== Early 1900s, foundation and the Banner Strawberry ===
The origin of Driscoll's dates back to the late 1800s. In 1849, a butcher from Alsace settled in California and eventually farmed near Watsonville. The butcher's son, J.E. "Ed" Reiter and Reiter's brother-in-law, R. F. "Dick" Driscoll, began growing strawberries in the region. It was the beginning of what has been referred to as "the California strawberry gold rush."

During a meeting between Thomas Loftus, Driscoll, and Reiter, the three formed a partnership to protect and promote strawberries in the Sweetbriar community in northern Shasta County, California. In 1902, the partners began promoting the strawberries in San Francisco markets by wrapping every crate in paper ribbon. The marketing strategy earned the strawberry variety the name "Banner" due to the large strawberry printed on the banner of each crate.

Driscoll's was officially founded in 1904, known at the time as Banner Berry Farm's Brand. They secretly kept Loftus as their supplier and also planted the Banner variety of berries exclusively. The company was the sole supplier of the Banner variety until Reiter formed an outside partnership in 1916 to market the Banner Berry plant. After twenty-years in business, the Banner variety was infected by the spread of a viral infection and Driscoll's began breeding and releasing new varieties of berries. The new varieties were developed by Harold Thomas and Earl Goldsmith from the University of California, Berkeley.

=== 1940s and founding of Driscoll Strawberry Associates ===
In the early twentieth century, the strawberry market in the United States was dominated by Japanese immigrants. In 1942 during World War II, the industry nearly collapsed due to the Japanese being forced into internment camps. During the war, Driscoll's was one of the few companies still planting strawberries. Following World War II, Driscoll's recruited Japanese-American former prisoners upon their release from the internment camps to become sharecroppers for the company. The company also began marketing under the name Driscoll Strawberry Associates.

In 1944, Goldsmith and Thomas quit their university jobs and went to work for the newly formed Strawberry Institute of California after the university planned to abandon its breeding program. The company purchased seedlings and germplasm from the university that represented the life work of Goldsmith and Thomas. The Strawberry Institute of California would later merge with Driscoll Strawberry Associates.

In 1946, Goldsmith and Thomas crossed two university varieties which eventually became known as Z5A. The variety was known to withstand shipping and also fruited into late summer. The late harvest allowed Driscoll's to ship strawberries to retailers when other growers had none. The berry was developed over a 10-year period and not released until 1957. In 1966, the merger of Strawberry Institute and Driscoll Strawberry Associates was completed.

=== 1980s to 2010 ===
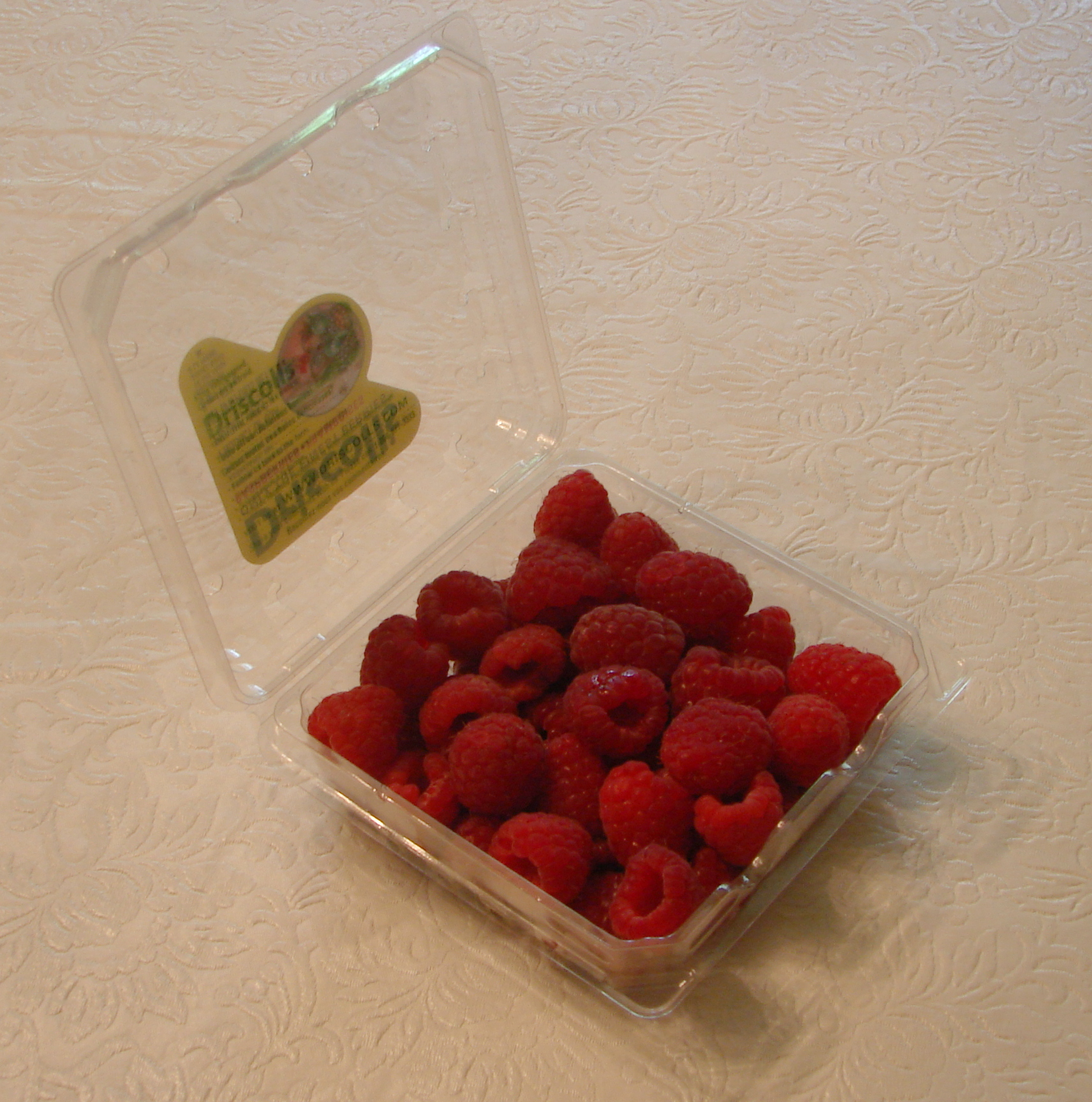
Driscoll's raspberries in a clamshell package invented by the company in the 1990s.

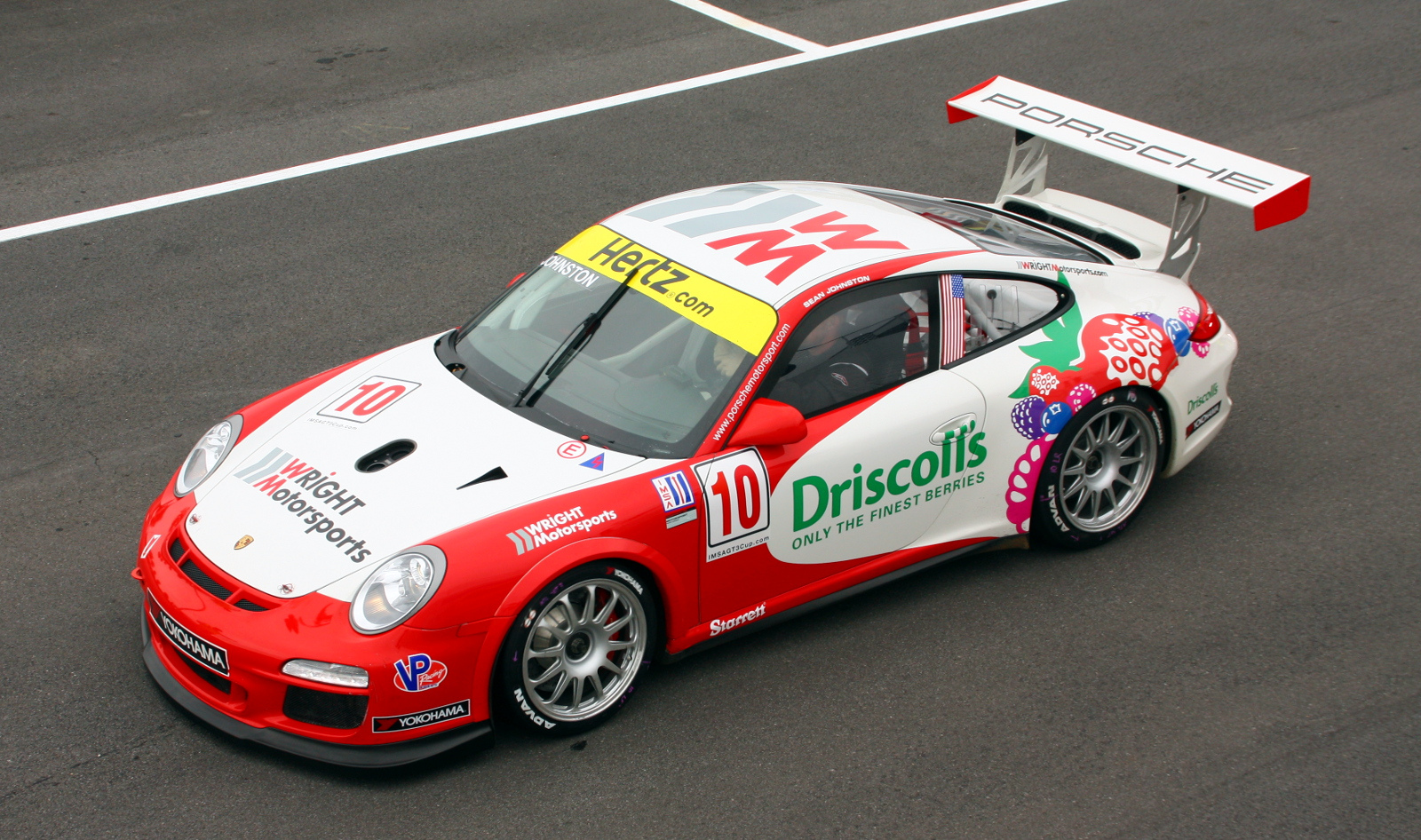
Driscoll's sponsored Porsche 997 GT3 Cup competing in the IMSA GT3 Cup Challenge

Driscoll's sold mainly strawberries until the late 1980s. At that time it was approached with purchase offers from Dole, Del Monte, and Chiquita. The company did not sell and instead decided to expand into other markets, including raspberries, blueberries and blackberries. In the 1990s, Driscoll's invented the hinged, ventilated plastic clamshell, a one-piece container consisting of two halves joined by a hinge area which allows the structure to come together to close. In 2008, Driscoll's was one of the first two California growers to legally ship strawberries to China under a program negotiated by then governor Arnold Schwarzenegger. In 2008 the company was also named Business of the Year by the Pajaro Valley Chamber of Commerce and Agriculture.

=== 2010 to 2020 ===
As of 2014, Driscoll's supports the Indigenous Interpreting+ program at Natividad Medical Center, Salinas, California, which provides medical interpreters for speakers of Indigenous languages such as Zapotec, Mixteco, and Triqui. In 2015, Driscoll's announced its involvement in "Connect the Drops," a campaign for changes to California water policy.

In 2015, workers and union leaders at two independent growers for Driscoll's called for boycotts against the company. The same year, Driscoll's announced the adoption of global Worker Welfare standards for their independent growers and public commitment to farmworker improvements with third-party audits and assessments. It also announced a pilot program with Fair Trade USA to bring to market Fair Trade Certified organic strawberries and organic raspberries. COO Kevin Murphy was promoted to CEO in 2015, replacing Miles Reiter, who retained his position as chairman of the board.

By 2016, Driscoll's began testing to develop a robot that would pick strawberries. The company also announced a name change from Driscoll's Strawberry Associates to Driscoll's, Inc.

=== 2020 to present ===
In June 2022, Driscoll's acquired Berry Gardens Limited, a sales, packaging and distribution entity of Berry Gardens Grower Cooperative. In July 2022, Driscoll's formally agreed to acquire Haygrove Africa Trading, a Sub-Saharan blueberry supplier. In October 2023, Soren Bjorn was named CEO of Driscoll's, after serving as president of Driscoll’s of the Americas. He began as CEO in January 2024 to oversee the company’s global day-to-day operations.

Driscoll's has invested years in research and development to increase production yields and improve the quality of its berries. The United States berry market is valued at $9 billion annually, having grown by 40 percent over the past five years. This growth has been driven primarily by strawberries and contributions from blueberries, raspberries, and blackberries. Driscoll's has recently introduced "Sweetest Batch", a premium tier of berries that commands a price approximately 30 percent higher than standard berries. The goal of the "Sweetest Batch" program is to boost the quality of strawberries, blueberries, raspberries, and blackberries of all varieties. To find the premium tier, Driscoll's develops and studies 125,000 strawberry varieties every year, in addition to other types of berries. As of 2024, Driscoll's is the world's largest berry company. In 2026, Driscoll’s came under scrutiny after a batch of their strawberries tested positive for pesticide residues. In response to these allegations, Driscoll's has said that its production is in “full compliance” with US food safety regulations. On August 25, 2026, Bjorn stepped down as CEO and was immediately replaced by Brie Reiter Smith.

In September 2026, the Wall Street Journal reported that Driscoll’s has filed more than 20 lawsuits against companies in China, mostly about intellectual-property theft.

== Products ==
Driscoll's grows berries in 21 countries and sells them in 48. It contracts with various growers to produce strawberries, blackberries, blueberries, and raspberries, both red and yellow. The berries, available in either organic or non-organic varieties, are packed in the field as they are harvested. The company has fields in California, Florida, Mexico, and Australia. The company's organic berries are certified organic by the USDA. Driscoll's holds 60 percent of the organic strawberry market in the U.S. Driscoll's claims to follow good agricultural practices for food safety, which are enforced at all contracting growers' farms, cooling and distribution facilities such as their Santa Maria, California, distribution facility. They also have a distribution facility in Dover, Florida.

The company has a staff of 30 scientists "devoted solely to strawberries, manipulating evolution at nine research stations in Watsonville, Southern California, Florida, Spain, Mexico, and the U.K."
