= Redbook 2000 =

Governmental recommendation

Redbook 2000: Toxicological Principles for the Safety Assessment of Food Ingredients is a non-binding guidance document published by the United States Food and Drug Administration (FDA)'s Center for Food Safety and Applied Nutrition (CFSAN). Issued in July 2007, it provides recommendations for industry, academia, and other stakeholders on the toxicological testing needed to support the safety of food ingredients, including food additives, color additives, food contact substances, and substances generally recognized as safe (GRAS). The document emphasizes a "reasonable certainty that a substance is not harmful under the intended conditions of use," guiding the design, conduct, and submission of toxicity studies to the FDA's Office of Food Chemical Safety, Dietary Supplements, and Innovation (also known as Chemical Safety Office).

== Background ==
The Redbook 2000 evolved from earlier FDA guidance on food safety assessments. The original Redbook I (1982), titled Toxicological Principles for the Safety Assessment of Direct Food Additives and Color Additives Used in Food, was developed by the FDA's Bureau of Foods (predecessor to CFSAN) to standardize the evaluation of food additive petitions under the Federal Food, Drug, and Cosmetic Act (FD&C Act). A draft revision, known as Redbook II, was released in 1993 (published in the Federal Register on March 29, 1993, at 58 FR 16536), incorporating public comments and advances in toxicology. Redbook 2000 represents the final revision, reflecting updates in scientific knowledge, technological advancements, and harmonization with international standards while maintaining U.S. safety priorities. It was renamed to broaden its scope beyond direct additives and color additives, and it adopted an electronic format for online accessibility, with chapters designed as stand-alone resources. The guidance was developed in response to feedback on Redbook II and aligns with amendments like the 1997 Food and Drug Administration Modernization Act (FDAMA), which streamlined notifications for food contact substances. As a guidance document, Redbook 2000 does not create enforceable rights or obligations but represents the FDA's current thinking on safety assessments. It encourages consultation with OFAS for alternative testing approaches and stresses that "various types of scientifically valid information may be used to support a determination that the proposed use of an ingredient is safe."

== Purpose ==
The primary purpose of Redbook 2000 is to assist petitioners, notifiers, and the FDA in evaluating the safety of food ingredients added to the U.S. food supply. It provides flexible, science-based recommendations for toxicity studies, helping determine if an ingredient poses risks under intended use conditions, including potential cumulative effects and estimated dietary exposure. Key objectives include:

- Guiding the submission of toxicological data for food additive petitions, GRAS notifications, and food contact substance notifications
- Promoting consistent, efficient safety reviews by outlining study designs, statistical analyses, and data interpretation
- Encouraging innovation by allowing modifications to recommended protocols with scientific justification, subject to FDA review.

The guidance supports the FDA's statutory mandate under the FD&C Act (Sections 201(s) and 201(t)) to ensure ingredients are safe, defined as providing "reasonable certainty of no harm" (21 CFR §§ 70.3, 170.3).

== Scope ==
Redbook 2000 applies broadly to "food ingredients," encompassing:

- Food additives - substances added directly or indirectly to food, affecting its characteristics (e.g., preservatives, emulsifiers, sweeteners; 21 CFR § 170.3(e)(1))
- Color additives - dyes, pigments, or substances imparting color to food, drugs, or cosmetics (FD&C Act § 201(t))
- Food contact substances - materials that may migrate into food (formerly indirect additives; per FDAMA amendments)
- GRAS substances - ingredients deemed safe by scientific consensus or historical use (21 CFR § 170.30), including those under voluntary FDA notification since 1997 (62 FR 18937)

It also covers toxicity assessments for residues and supports evaluations under related regulations. The scope excludes drugs, cosmetics, and non-food uses but can inform international harmonization efforts.

== Key Principles ==
Redbook 2000 is grounded in principles of sound scientific judgment and flexibility:Safety Standard: "Reasonable certainty that no harm will result from aggregate exposure" (21 CFR §§ 70.3, 170.3), considering toxicity data, chemical structure, and consumption estimates.

- Tiered Testing - recommendations are based on "concern levels" (I–III) for additives, with more extensive studies for higher-risk substances
- Holistic Assessment - integrates absorption, distribution, metabolism, excretion (ADME), genetic toxicity, reproductive/developmental effects, and chronic/carcinogenic risks
- Non-Binding Nature - uses "should" for suggestions; deviations are permissible with rationale and FDA consultation
- Ethical Considerations - studies must comply with Good Laboratory Practices (GLP) and animal welfare standards

The guidance stresses multidisciplinary input and pre-submission discussions to tailor studies.

== Structure ==
Redbook 2000 is organized into stand-alone chapters for online navigation. The main sections include:

- Introduction
- Agency Review of Toxicology Information Submitted in Support of the Safety Assessment of Food Ingredients
- Recommended Toxicity Studies
- Guidelines for Toxicity Studies
- Additional Studies
- Human Studies
- Glossary: Acronyms and Definitions

== Revisions and Updates ==
Redbook 2000 incorporated:

- Public comments on the 1993 draft
- Advances in toxicology (e.g., in vitro methods, biomarkers)
- Alignment with international bodies (e.g., Joint FAO/WHO Expert Committee on Food Additives)

As of 2025, it remains the current guidance, with no major revisions announced. Comments or updates can be submitted via docket FDA-2013-S-0610. The FDA periodically reviews and may issue targeted updates, such as for emerging issues like nanomaterials.

== Criticism and limitations ==
While praised for standardizing safety assessments, Redbook 2000 has faced criticism for relying on short-term/subchronic studies (e.g., 90 days) for low-concern additives, potentially missing long-term effects like endocrine disruption or obesity. Critics argue the tiered approach prioritizes efficiency over comprehensive chronic testing, contributing to public health gaps amid rising obesity rates. The FDA counters that guidelines ensure safety for intended uses and welcomes alternative data.

== Related Documents ==
- Redbook I (1982): Original guidance for direct additives.
- Redbook II Draft (1993): Precursor with initial revisions.
- 21 CFR Parts 170–186: Regulations on food additives and GRAS.
- FDA GRAS Notification Program: Voluntary review process (post-1997).
