= National Chicken Council =

The National Chicken Council (NCC) is a non-profit trade association based in Washington, D.C. that represents the interests of the United States chicken industry to the United States Congress and United States federal agencies. The association changed its name to the NCC from the National Broiler Council in 1999.

Members of the NCC include chicken producers and processors, poultry distributors, and industry firms. Chicken producers and processors in the NCC account for approximately 95% of the chickens produced in the United States. Issues important to the council include biosecurity in the poultry industry and avian influenza. The council sponsors EatChicken.com, a website providing chicken recipes, cooking tips, and food safety information. In October 2011, Lampkin Butts, the president and chief executive officer of Sanderson Farms, was named the chairman of the National Chicken Council. He served for one year.
