= International Clinical Trials Registry Platform =

World Health Organization trials registry

The International Clinical Trials Registry Platform (ICTRP) is a platform for the registration of clinical trials operated by the World Health Organization.

The ICTRP combines data from multiple cooperating clinical trials registries to generate a global view of clinical trials worldwide, with a search portal that allows access to the entire dataset. It requires a minimum standard set of database fields, the WHO Trial Registration Data Set, to be present for a trial to be registered. All entries are given a Universal Trial Number (UTN) that identifies them uniquely.

The organization has sought to assist various national governments in establishing their own clinical trials databases.

It combines data from the following primary registries and data providers:

- Australian New Zealand Clinical Trials Registry (ANZCTR)
- Brazilian Clinical Trials Registry (ReBec)
- Chinese Clinical Trial Registry (ChiCTR)
- Clinical Research Information Service (CRiS), Republic of Korea
- ClinicalTrials.gov
- Clinical Trials Information System (CTIS), European Medicines Agency
- Clinical Trials Registry - India (CTRI)
- Cuban Public Registry of Clinical Trials (RPCEC)
- EU Clinical Trials Register (EU-CTR)
- German Clinical Trials Register (DRKS)
- Iranian Registry of Clinical Trials (IRCT)
- ISRCTN (UK)
- International Traditional Medicine Clinical Trial Registry (ITMCTR)
- Japan Registry of Clinical Trials (jRCT)
- Japan Primary Registries Network (JPRN)
- Lebanese Clinical Trials Registry (LBCTR)
- Overview of Medical Research in the Netherlands (OMON)
- Thai Clinical Trials Registry (TCTR)
- Pan African Clinical Trial Registry (PACTR)
- Peruvian Clinical Trial Registry (REPEC)
- Sri Lanka Clinical Trials Registry (SLCTR)

== See also ==
- ClinicalTrials.gov
- Clinical trial registration
- List of clinical trial registries
