= FDA recall policies =

The United States Food and Drug Administration has published certain product recall policies applicable to consumer products.

== FDA-Industry Co-operation ==
The manufacturers or distributors of the product carry out most recalls of products regulated by FDA voluntarily. In some instances, a company discovers that one of its products is defective and recalls it entirely on its own. In others, FDA informs a company of findings that one of its products is defective and suggests or requests a recall. Usually, the company will comply.

If the firm does not recall the product, then FDA can seek legal action under the FD&C Act. These include seizure of available product, and/or injunction of the firm, including a court request for recall of the product.

This cooperation between FDA and its regulated industries has proven to remove dangerous products from the market. This method has been successful because it is in the interest of FDA, as well as industry, to get unsafe and defective products out of consumer hands as soon as possible.

== Guidelines ==
FDA guidelines for companies to follow when recalling defective products under the Agency's jurisdiction are published in Title 21 of the Code of Federal Regulations, Part 7. These guidelines make clear that FDA expects these firms to take full responsibility for product recalls, including follow-up checks to assure that recalls are successful. Under the guidelines, companies are expected to notify FDA when recalls are started, to make progress reports to FDA on recalls, and to undertake recalls when asked to do so by the Agency.

The guidelines also call on manufacturers and distributors to develop contingency plans for product recalls that can be put into effect if, and when needed. FDA's role under the guidelines is to monitor company recalls and assess the adequacy of a firm's action. After a recall is completed, FDA makes sure that the product is destroyed or suitably reconditioned and investigates why the product was defective.

Generally, FDA accepts reports and other necessary recall information submitted by e-mail. In many cases, this has become routine for some firms and FDA district offices. However, FDA maintains the prerogative for investigational visits and other in-person communications where the agency considers it appropriate.

== Recall classes ==
The guidelines categorize all recalls into one of three classes according to the level of hazard involved.

=== Class I ===
Class I recalls are for dangerous or defective products that predictably could cause serious health problems or death. Examples of products that could fall into this category are a food found to contain botulinal toxin, food with undeclared allergens, a label mix-up on a life saving drug, or a defective artificial heart valve.

=== Class II ===
Class II recalls are for products that might cause a temporary health problem or pose only a slight threat of a serious nature. One example is a drug that is under-strength but that is not used to treat life-threatening situations.

=== Class III ===
Class III recalls are for products that are unlikely to cause any adverse health reaction, but that violate FDA labeling or manufacturing regulations. Examples might be a container defect (plastic material delaminating or a lid that does not seal); off-taste, color, or leaks in a bottled drink, and lack of English labeling in a retail food.

== Recall information ==
FDA develops a strategy for each individual recall that sets forth how extensively it will check on a company's performance in recalling the product in question. For a Class I recall, for example, FDA would check to make sure that each defective product has been recalled or reconditioned. In contrast, for a Class III recall, the Agency may decide that it only needs to spot check to make sure the product is off the market.

Even though the firm recalling the product may issue a press release, FDA seeks publicity about a recall only when it believes the public needs to be alerted about a serious hazard. For example, if a canned food product, purchased by a consumer at a retail store, were found by FDA to contain botulinal toxin, an effort would be made to retrieve all the cans in circulation, including those in the hands of consumers. As part of this effort, the Agency also could issue a public warning via the news media to alert as many consumers as possible to the potential hazard.

== See also ==
- Contamination control
