= Generally recognized as safe =

United States government designation for food additives

Generally recognized as safe (GRAS) is a United States Food and Drug Administration (FDA) designation that a chemical or substance added to food is considered safe by experts under the conditions of its intended use. An ingredient with a GRAS designation is exempted from the usual Federal Food, Drug, and Cosmetic Act (FFDCA) food additive tolerance requirements.

Some examples of substances recognized as GRAS include ascorbic acid (vitamin C), citric acid, and salt, which are all commonly used in food preservation and flavoring. The concept of food additives being "generally recognized as safe" was first described in the Food Additives Amendment of 1958, and all additives introduced after this time had to be evaluated by new standards.

== Affirmation and notification ==
GRAS substances can be self-affirmed upon determination by qualified non-governmental experts, with or without FDA notification, or the FDA itself can affirm:

- Self-affirmation without FDA notification. The manufacturer of this chemical or substance had performed all necessary research, including the formation of an expert panel to review safety concerns, and is prepared to use these findings to defend its product's GRAS status. FDA is not notified.
- Self-affirmation with FDA notification. The manufacturer has performed all the aforementioned due diligence, and submitted a GRAS notification to inform the FDA of a determination that the use of a substance is GRAS. Following evaluation, the FDA provides three possible responses: 1. FDA does not question the basis for the notifier's GRAS determination, 2. the notification does not provide a sufficient basis for GRAS determination, or 3. the FDA has, at the notifier's request, ceased to evaluate the GRAS notice.
- FDA affirmation. Rarely, the FDA can affirm GRAS status through rulemaking on its own initiative.

For substances used in food prior to January 1, 1958, a grandfather clause allows experience based on common use in food to be used in asserting an ingredient is safe under the conditions of their intended use.

The FDA can also explicitly withdraw the GRAS classification, as it did for trans fat in 2015.

== Scientific evidence required ==
For new proposals, the proponent of the GRAS exemption – usually a food manufacturer or ingredient supplier wishing to highlight a food ingredient in its manufactured product – has the burden of providing rigorous scientific evidence that use of the substance in an edible consumer product is safe.

Scientific procedures for GRAS exemptions require the same quantity and quality of scientific evidence needed to obtain approval of the substance as a food additive, and are ordinarily based upon published studies but may be corroborated by unpublished studies, data, and information. FDA has not issued guidance to companies on how to document their GRAS determinations.

== Intended use ==
The substance must be shown to be "generally recognized" as safe under the conditions of its intended use. To establish GRAS, the proponent must show that there is a consensus of expert opinion that the substance is safe for its intended use. For existing GRAS items, new uses should not substantially exceed historical occurrence levels of the substance in the diet.

== Enforcement ==
When use of a substance does not qualify for the GRAS exemption, it is subject to the premarket approval mandated by the Federal Food, Drug, and Cosmetic Act. In such circumstances, the FDA can take enforcement action to stop distribution of the food substance and foods containing it on the grounds that such foods are not deemed GRAS or contain an unlawfully added ingredient.

A substance that fails to qualify as GRAS is treated as an unsafe food additive, rendering the food adulterated under 21 U.S.C. § 342(a)(2)(C)(i). Enforcement is discretionary. The FDA may proceed through judicial actions (e.g., seizure or injunction under 21 U.S.C. §§ 332–334) or impose civil monetary penalties (under 21 U.S.C. § 333(f)(2)). Civil monetary penalty proceedings are conducted under 21 CFR 17, with an initial decision by an administrative law judge and administrative appellate review by the Departmental Appeals Board.

An example of a non-GRAS ingredient requiring enforcement actions in the form of FDA warning letters to 15 companies in 2019 was cannabidiol, which, as of 2024, had not been established with sufficient scientific evidence of safety as a GRAS ingredient.

== New Dietary Ingredient process ==
The separate New Dietary Ingredient (NDI) notification process is FDA's premarket system for certain ingredients in dietary supplements defined in the Dietary Supplement Health and Education Act of 1994 (DSHEA). Supplement makers have been accused of "routinely and systematically" bypassing the DSHEA NDI process by using GRAS exemptions: first adding new compounds to a food and self-certifying, with or without FDA notification, then adding them to supplements.

== History ==
On 6 September 1958, the Food Additives Amendment of 1958 was signed into law, with a list of 700 food substances that were exempt from the then-new requirement that manufacturers test food additives before the manufactured foods were marketed. In 1960, William W. Goodrich, assistant general counsel of the FDA, emphasized that GRAS status under the amendment depended on broad expert consensus, distinguishing it from mere proof of safety, and urged treating doubtful substances as food additives requiring formal approval.

In the 1970s and 1980s, the FDA engaged in a systematic reconsideration of the safety of GRAS substances. In 1971, FDA issued criteria for determining GRAS status on its own initiative, and in 1972, the GRAS affirmation petition process was created to allow individuals to initiate reviews. Between 1974–1976, the FDA clarified the distinction between GRAS by scientific procedures and by common use in food before 1958.

In 1997, the FDA replaced the affirmation petition process with a "GRAS affirmation process with a [voluntary] notification procedure" for which any person or company could notify the FDA that a substance had convincing scientific evidence for GRAS status under the conditions of its intended use to unburden agency resources, encourage industry disclosure, and maintain legal safeguards. Starting in 2000, Redbook 2000 provides core FDA guidelines for toxicity testing of direct food additives covering GRAS under 21 CFR § 170.3, including tiered studies and ADME evaluations.

In 2026, FDA announced a proactive post-market assessment program, including an initial reassessment of several GRAS substances.

== Concerns about ingredient safety ==
In 2010, the United States Government Accountability Office (GAO) published a report about potential deficiencies in the GRAS review process, giving four main areas of concern:

- the GRAS oversight process does not confirm the safety of all new ingredient assessments. This potential deficiency occurs because the FDA assesses GRAS petitions only if the manufacturer voluntarily notifies the FDA.
- the FDA has not provided guidance to companies for sufficiently documenting scientific evidence of safety in GRAS petitions.
- there is no final FDA regulation for criteria in the voluntary notification program, challenging credibility for GRAS status, and there exists insufficient monitoring in the public market for the continued safety of GRAS substances.
- companies considering use of engineered nanomaterials in food can use the voluntary GRAS notification process, assuming full safety without the FDA having a complete assessment. In contrast to this absence of review, nanomaterials intended for use in foods must be fully reviewed for safety in Canada and the European Union before marketing.

Despite consumer group objections that this change would soften premarket safety scrutiny on new food ingredients, including a 2017 lawsuit by Center for Food Safety against the FDA, in 2021 a federal district court found that the FDA did not unlawfully delegate its authority over food safety, and that the rule was compliant with the Federal Food, Drug, and Cosmetic Act.

A 2024 review of the FDA GRAS program identified several deficiencies, including the large volume of food additives needing better scrutiny, the strained resources for constant FDA surveillance, delays in enforcement action, and limited postmarket overview to ensure ingredient safety. The review provided recommendations for improving the GRAS process, including mandatory premarket assessments with application fees, more transparency in postmarket FDA review of GRAS substances and other additives used in food manufacturing, and additional resources to be allocated by Congress.

In contrast to the need for increased resources to support the FDA, including improvements to the GRAS system, thousands of FDA employees were fired by the Trump Administration in April, 2025.

Conflict of interest when a company pays or (indirectly) funds another company or individual to prove food additives as GRAS.

In May 2025, the FDA announced it was planning a systematic postmarket review of GRAS substances. The announcement indicated increased scrutiny and burden of compliance for food manufacturers to justify GRAS, and a possible reevaluation of existing GRAS notifications. A congressional rule change for the GRAS review process was also submitted in early 2025.

== List of GRAS substances ==
The list of GRAS notices (GRAS Notice Inventory) is updated approximately each month by the FDA. The list of GRAS affirmations by FDA appear in Title 21 of the Code of Federal Regulations. As of September 2025 (beginning in 1998), approximately 1,240 ingredient or food substances have been filed with the FDA, with dozens of applications pending. FDA posts status of the review as either without further questions (as a position of "no objection"), pending review, or the petition is withdrawn by the applicant.

== See also ==
- Generally recognized as safe and effective
- Novel food
- Substantial equivalence
