= Community-based clinical trial =

Studies conducted by primary providers

Community-based clinical trials are clinical trials conducted directly through doctors and clinics rather than academic research facilities. They are designed to be administered through primary care physicians, community health centers and local outpatient facilities. In 1986, the Community Consortium held the first such trials in the United States to determine the efficiency of preventive treatments after the onset of Pneumocystis pneumonia. The trials give patients access to new medications and keep doctors involved with new developments in research. However, critics state that drug company payments to doctors for patients enrolled in such studies present a conflict of interest and potential for abuse. Community-based trials are becoming prevalent in human-testing stage pharmaceutical research.

== See also ==
- Clinical trial
