= Partnership for Food Safety Education =

American nonprofit organization

- Abbreviation: PFSE
- Formation: 1994
- Purpose: Aims to prevent foodborne illnesses
- Board Chair: Dr. Barb Masters
- Website: https://fightbac.org/

The Partnership for Food Safety Education, based in Arlington, VA, is a nonprofit organization established to prevent foodborne illnesses and fatalities in the United States. The organization employs resources premised on scientific evidence to effectively engage its target audience. Its members include representatives from the food industry, professional societies specializing in food science, nutrition, health, and consumer groups, as well as government agencies such as the United States Department of Agriculture, the Centers for Disease Control and Prevention, and the Food and Drug Administration. The organization's services cater to health and food safety educators nationwide who identify themselves as "BAC! Fighters."

In 2024, Dr. Barb Masters, Vice President of regulatory policy, food and agriculture for Tyson Foods, was elected as board chair.

== History ==
The Partnership for Food Safety Education (PFSE) was established in the United States in 1994 to educate consumers about safe food-handling practices to reduce the occurrence of foodborne illnesses. PFSE is a non-profit organization that collaborates with government agencies, industry associations, and academic institutions to promote food safety education through its "Fight BAC!" campaign. The campaign provides consumers with clear and practical guidelines for safe food handling, including handwashing, proper cooking temperatures, and timely refrigeration.

In 2003, the Partnership for Food Safety Education received a determination letter from the IRS, recognizing it as a nonprofit organization under Section 501(c)(3).

In 2010, the Partnership conducted a strategic analysis and identified three focal areas: convening, amplifying, and evaluating. The Partnership supports consumer food safety education through these approaches by bringing stakeholders together, raising awareness, and assessing the effectiveness of educational efforts.

=== Fight BAC! Campaign ===
The Partnership for Food Safety Education is responsible for the development of the Fight BAC! campaign. In 1997, the campaign was established through a collaborative initiative involving industry representatives and federal government agencies with the aim of promoting consumer food safety education. During the campaign's development, sixteen focus groups were conducted in six cities to gather insights and input from the public. These efforts contributed to shaping the content and direction of the campaign.
