= Food and Drug Administration Modernization Act of 1997 =

US law

- Long title: A bill to amend the Federal Food, Drug, and Cosmetic Act and the Public Health Service Act to improve the regulation of food, drugs, devices, and biological products, and for other purposes.
- Acronyms (colloquial): FDAMA
- Enacted by: the 105th United States Congress
- Effective: November 21, 1997

Citations
- Public law: 105-115
- Statutes at Large: 111 U.S. Stat 2296

Codification
- Acts amended: Federal Food, Drug, and Cosmetic Act
- Titles amended: Title 21: Food and Drugs
- U.S.C. sections amended: 21 U.S.C. ch. 9 § 301 et seq.

Legislative history
- Introduced in the Senate as S.830 by; Sen Spencer Abraham; Sen Daniel Coats; Sen Christopher J. Dodd; Sen William H. Frist; Sen Chuck Hagel; Sen James M. Jeffords; Sen Connie Mack, III; Sen Barbara A. Mikulski on June 5, 1997; Committee consideration by; Senate Labor and Human Resources; House Commerce; Subcommittee on Health and Environment; Signed into law by President Bill Clinton on November 21, 1997

The United States Food and Drug Administration Modernization Acts (FDAMA) are amendments to the Federal Food, Drug, and Cosmetic Act, which regulated products by the Food and Drug Administration (FDA). The first bill, the FDA Modernization Act of 1997, reduced the timeline for approving new pharmaceutical drugs. It also loosened rules around broadcast pharmaceutical advertising.

In 2022, the Act was updated with the FDA Modernization Act 2.0, which cancelled a 1938 mandate to require animal testing for every drug development protocol.

== History ==
Congressman Richard Burr and Senator James M. Jeffords were the chairperson sponsors of the Food and Drug Administration Regulatory Modernization Act of 1997 or FDA Modernization Act of 1997. The U.S. legislation was signed by Bill Clinton on 21 November 1997, and fully enacted by 1 April 1999, putting into law reforms begun under the National Partnership for Reinventing Government. One result of the passing of the act was a reduction in the time for the approval of new pharmaceutical drugs. Critics questioned whether the shortened time frame for the approval of prescription drugs would do more harm than good.

In 2022, the Act was updated with the FDA Modernization Act 2.0. Signed into law by President Joe Biden, the act cancelled an earlier mandate (set by the Federal Food, Drug, and Cosmetics Act of 1938) to require animal testing in drug development.

== FDA Modernization Act of 1997 ==
The following are the most significant provisions of the 1997 act:

=== Prescription drug user fees ===
The act reauthorized, for five more years, the Prescription Drug User Fee Act of 1992 (PDUFA). This enabled the FDA to reduce the average time required for a drug review from 30 months to 15 months.

=== FDA initiatives and programs ===
The law enacted FDA initiatives undertaken under Vice President Al Gore's Reinventing Government program. The initiatives include measures to modernize the regulation of biological products by bringing them in harmony with the regulations for drugs and eliminating the need for establishment license application; eliminate the batch certification and monograph requirements for insulin and antibiotics; streamline the approval processes for drug and biological manufacturing changes; and reduce the need for environmental assessment as part of a product application.

The act also codified FDA regulations and practice to increase patient access to experimental drugs and medical devices and to accelerate review of important new medications. In addition, the law provided for an expanded database on clinical trials, ClinicalTrials.gov.

=== Information on off-label use and drug economics ===
The law abolishes the long-standing prohibition of broadcasting by manufacturers of information about unapproved uses of drugs and medical devices. The act allows a firm to circulate peer-reviewed journal articles about an off-label indication of its product, providing the company is also committing itself to file proof of research within a certain amount of time.

The act also allows drug companies to provide economic information about their products to formulary committees, managed care organizations, and similar large-scale buyers of health-care products. The law, however, does not permit the spreading of economic information that could affect prescribing choices to individual medical practitioners.

=== Pharmacy compounding ===
The act creates a special exemption to ensure continued availability of compounded drug products prepared by pharmacists to provide patients with individualized therapies not available commercially. The law, however, seeks to prevent manufacturing under the guise of compounding by establishing parameters within which the practice is appropriate and lawful.

=== Risk-based regulation of medical devices ===
The act complements and builds on the FDA's measures to focus its resources on medical devices that present the greatest risks to patients. The law also directs the FDA to focus its post market surveillance on higher risk devices, and allows the agency to implement a reporting system that concentrates on a representative sample of user facilities—such as hospitals and nursing homes—that experience deaths and serious illnesses or injuries linked with the use of devices.

Finally, the law expands an ongoing pilot program under which the FDA accredits outside—so-called "third party"—experts to conduct the initial review of all low-to-intermediate risk class I and II devices. The act, however, specifies that an accredited person may not review devices that are permanently implantable, life-supporting, life sustaining, or for which clinical data are required.

=== Food safety and labeling ===
The act eliminates the requirement of the FDA's premarket approval for most packaging and other substances that come in contact with food and may migrate into it. Instead, the law establishes a process whereby the manufacturer can notify the agency of its intent to use certain food contact substances and, unless the FDA objects within 120 days, the manufacturer may proceed with the marketing of the new product. Implementation of the notification process is contingent on additional appropriations to cover its cost to the agency. The act also expands procedures under which the FDA can authorize health claims and nutrient content claims without reducing the statutory standard. Redbook 2000 incorporates FDAMA's updates on food contact substances.

=== Standards for medical products ===
In the area of drugs, the law codifies the agency's current practice of allowing in certain circumstances one clinical investigation as the basis for product approval. The act, however, does preserve the presumption that, as a general rule, two adequate and well-controlled studies are needed to prove the product's safety and effectiveness. The current FDA commissioner, Marty Makary, indicated the FDA will reinterpret this statute to justify the broad use of one pivotal trial in 2026.

In the area of medical devices, the act specifies that the FDA may keep out of the market products whose manufacturing processes are so deficient that they could present a serious health hazard. The law also gives the agency authority to take appropriate action if the technology of a device suggests that it is likely to be used for a potentially harmful unlabeled use.

== FDA Modernization Act 2.0 ==
In 2022, the FDA Modernization Act 2.0 was approved and signed into law by President Joe Biden. The FDA Modernization Act of 2.0 removed the requirement for animal testing in drug development, making it optional. This enabled further development of new alternative technologies such as cell assays, computer modeling, and bioprinting.

== See also ==
- Food and Drug Administration Amendments Act of 2007
