= Newspapers of the Chicago metropolitan area =

The following newspapers have been or are printed in the Chicago metropolitan area.

== Daily newspapers ==
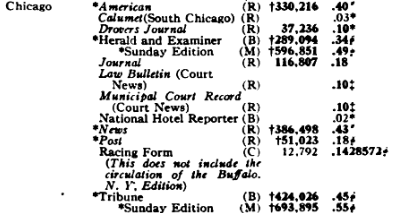
1919 Chicago newspapers circulation data (Editor & Publisher)

- The Beacon-News
- Chicago Sun-Times (1948–present)
- Chicago Tribune (1847–present)
- The Courier-News (Elgin)
- Daily Herald
- Daily Southtown (1906–present)
- The Herald-News
- Hoy
- Kane County Chronicle
- Naperville Sun
- News Sun (1892–present)
- Northwest Herald
- Post-Tribune
- The Times of Northwest Indiana (1906–present)

== Major weekly newspapers ==
- Chicago Defender (1905–present, daily between 1956 and 2003)
- Chicago Reader (1971–present)
- Journal & Topics Media Group (1933–present)
- Newcity (weekly from 1986–2017; monthly from 2017–present)
- Sanghamam (2001–present)
- South Side Weekly

== Past daily and major weekly newspapers ==
- Chicago American (1900–1939, became Herald-American)
- Chicago Chronicle (1895–1908)
- Chicago Courier (1874–1876)
- Chicago Daily News (1876–1978)
- Chicago Daily Telegraph (1878–1881, became Chicago Morning Herald)
- Chicago Daily Times (1929–1948, merged with Chicago Sun to form Chicago Sun-Times)
- Chicago Democrat (1833–1861)
- Chicago Democratic Press (1852–1857)
- Chicago Evening Mail (1870–1875, merged to become Post & Mail)
- Chicago Evening Post (1865–1875, merged to become Post & Mail)
- Chicago Evening Post (1886–1932, absorbed by Chicago Daily News)
- Chicago Evening Press & Mail (1884–1897)
- Chicago Examiner (1902–1918, became Herald-Examiner)
- Chicago Express (1842–1843)
- Chicago Globe (1887–1895)
- Chicago Herald (1881–1918)
- Chicago Herald-Examiner (1918–39, became Herald-American)
- Chicago Herald-American (1939–1958, became Chicago's American)
- Chicago Inter Ocean (1872–1914, became Record-Herald)
- Chicago Journal (1844–1929, absorbed by Chicago Daily News)
- Chicago Mail (1885–1894)
- Chicago Morning Herald (1893–1901, became Record-Herald)
- Chicago Morning News (1881, became Chicago Record)
- Chicago Post (1890–1929, absorbed by Daily News)
- Chicago Post & Mail (1875–1878, absorbed by Chicago Daily News)
- Chicago Record (1881–1901)
- Chicago Record Herald (1901–1914)
- Chicago Republican (1865–1872, became Chicago Inter Ocean)
- Chicago Sun (1941–1948, merged with Chicago Daily Times to form Chicago Sun-Times)
- Chicago Times (1861–1895, became Times-Herald)
- Chicago Times-Herald (1895–1901, became Record-Herald)
- Chicago Whip (1919–1939)
- Chicago's American (1958–1969, became Today)
- Today (1969–1974)
- City News Bureau of Chicago, local cooperative wire service

== Chicago weekly community newspapers ==
- Ashburn Independent
- Austin Voice
- Austin Weekly News
- Beverly News
- Beverly Review
- Brighton Park/McKinley Park Life
- Bridgeport News
- Bulgaria SEGA Newspaper (2005– )
- Shoreland News
- Chicago Citizen Newspapers
- Chicago Independent Bulletin
- Chicago Journal
- Chicago Standard
- Clear Ridge Reporter
- Exito
- Extra Bilingual Community Newspaper
- The Garfield Lawndale Voice
- The Gazette
- The Gate
- Greek Star
- Hi India Weekly
- Hyde Park Herald
- India Bulletin
- Inside-Booster
- Korean News
- Korean Times
- Journal News
- La Raza
- La Voz de Chicago
- La Voz del Paseo Boricua
- Lawndale News
- Mt. Greenwood Express
- News-Star
- North Lawndale Community News
- Northwest Leader-Post
- Northwest Side Press
- Our Neighborhood Times
- Polish Daily News
- Reporter/Journal
- Sauganash Sounds
- Scottsdale Independent
- Skyline
- South Street Journal
- Southeast Chicago Observer
- Southwest Courier
- Southwest News Herald
- Ukrainske Slovo Newspaper (2002– )
- Windy City Times

== Suburban community newspapers ==
- Desplaines Valley News
- Evanston Roundtable
- Evanston Sentinel
- Forest Park Review
- Journal-Topics Newspapers
- Lombardian
- Lombard Spectator
- Niles Bugle
- Pioneer Press
- Saint Charles Republican
- Suburban Life newspapers
- Tri-City Journal
- 22nd Century Media
- Wednesday Journal

== Past community newspapers ==
- Back-of-Yards Journal
- Citizen (1900s–1930)
- Chatham Citizen (1965–1975)
- Edison Review
- Life
- Chicago Free Press (1999–2010)
- Gay Chicago
- Gay Life (1970s–80s)
- North Loop News
- Northside News (1930s)
- Near North News
- New Metro News
- Norwood Review
- Brookfield Enterprise / The Times (1932–1985)
- Residents' Journal
- River North News
- The Skeleton News
- Times (1950s–2005)
- Uptown Action (1980–1985)
- Westside Journal
- West Town Chicago Journal
- West Town Free Press (1997–2002)
- Voice

== Specialized local newspapers ==
- Bar Fly
- Chicago Catholic, bi-weekly newspaper for the Archdiocese of Chicago
- Chicago Computer Guide
- Chicago Daily Law Bulletin
- Chicago Educator
- Chicago Journal of Commerce and Daily Financial Times (1920-1923, became Chicago Journal of Commerce and LaSalle Street Journal)
- Chicago Journal of Commerce and LaSalle Street Journal (1923-1950, purchased by Wall Street Journal and became Chicago Edition of the Wall Street Journal)
- Chicago Parent
- The Chicago Reporter
- Chicago Sports Weekly
- Chicago Suburban Family
- Crain's Chicago Business
- Outlines
- PerformInk
- StreetWise (1992–present)

== See also ==
- List of newspapers in Illinois
