= Chicago Underground =

Chicago Underground may refer to:

- Chicago Underground Film Festival, founded in 1994
- Chicago Underground (jazz ensemble), an avant-garde jazz duo/trio/quartet/orchestra led by Rob Mazurek and Chad Taylor
- Chicago Underground Library, a collection focusing on material produced by small presses or independent publishers
