= Venzon =

Venzon is a surname. Notable people with the surname include:

- Mericien Venzon (born 1991), Filipino figure skater
- Tony Venzon (1915–1971), American baseball player and umpire

== See also ==
- Venson
