= Wednesday Journal =

Newspaper publisher in Oak Park, Illinois

Wednesday Journal Newspapers
- Type: Weekly newspapers, community journalism
- Format: Broadsheet
- Owner: NEWSWELL (Arizona State University)
- Publisher: Dan Haley
- Managing editor: Terry Dean (Austin Weekly News), Ben Meyerson (Chicago Journal, Skyline), Nick Moroni (Forest Park Review); Bob Uphues (Riverside Brookfield Landmark)
- Opinion editor: Ken Trainor
- Photo editor: David Pierini
- Staff writers: Devin Rose, Anna Lothson (Wednesday Journal)
- Headquarters: 141 S. Oak Park Ave., Oak Park, IL 60302
- Circulation: 9,400 (Skyline)
- Website: oakpark.com

Wednesday Journal, Inc. is a newspaper publisher based in Oak Park, Illinois. It publishes a free weekly community newspaper in Chicago's Austin neighborhood, paid weekly newspapers in the city's western suburbs.

In 2019, Wednesday Journal became owned by the nonprofit Growing Community Media. In 2026, Growing Community Media donated its papers to NEWSWELL, a nonprofit associated with Arizona State University.

== Current publications ==
=== Chicago community newspapers ===
All of Wednesday Journal, Inc.'s Chicago-based community newspapers are published on Wednesdays.

==== Austin Weekly News ====
Austin Weekly News was founded 1986 by Liliana Drechney, a former reporter for the now-defunct Leader Papers, Inc. community newspaper chain. For most of its history, the paper served the Austin community area. In 2010, it expanded its circulation to cover North Lawndale and West Garfield Park community areas.

==== Skyline ====
Launched by Lerner Newspapers in the 1960s, the Skyline covered the Gold Coast, Lincoln Park, the Loop and the Near North Side, with an emphasis on society gossip. The Skyline was the only Lerner paper not to cover school sports. In 2005, Pioneer Press sold the nameplate to the Wednesday Journal. Today, it covers the Gold Coast, Lincoln Park, Old Town, former Cabrini-Green and River North. True to its historic emphasis on society gossip, it is the only Wednesday Journal newspaper to retain a gossip column, written by Ann Gerber. Circulation: 9,400

By 2009 through 2024, Skyline is published by Inside Publications, but no longer by Wednesday Journal/Growing Media.

===== Regular features =====
- Heart of the Hood
- Ann Gerber's Society Column
- Hot Shots
- Metropolis

=== Suburban newspapers ===
Unlike the city newspapers, suburban newspapers are paid. They can be found in newsboxes throughout their respective coverage areas. They are also available by subscription. Compared to their city-based counterparts, the suburban newspapers are larger and contain more articles per issue.

=== Forest Park Review ===
The oldest Wednesday Journal suburban newspaper, it has been published since 1902.

- Riverside Brookfield Landmark

=== Wednesday Journal of Oak Park and River Forest ===
Founded in 1980, Wednesday Journal is the flagship newspaper of the Wednesday Journal Publications. It serves the cities of Oak Park and River Forest.

== Former publications ==
=== Booster ===
The Booster is the oldest newspaper to ever be owned by Wednesday Journal. It was originally known as the Lincoln-Belmont Booster. Leo Lerner launched his Lerner Newspapers empire when he acquired it in 1926. In 2000, it, along with the other surviving Lerner newspapers, were sold to Pioneer Press. In 2005, Pioneer Press sold The Booster to the Wednesday Journal.

The Booster covered various North Side neighborhoods, including Avondale, Irving Park, Lake View, Lincoln-Belmont, Lincoln Park, Logan-Armitage, North Center, Roscoe Village and Sheridan Center. The Wednesday Journal-published editions covered Lake View, North Center and Roscoe Village.

In 2008, Wednesday Journal resold the Booster nameplate to Inside Publications. The Inside Publications merged it with its main publication, Inside, to form the Inside-Booster.

Mike Royko had his start at the Lincoln-Belmont Booster.

=== Chicago Journal ===
Established in 2000 to cover South Loop, West Loop and Near West Side neighborhoods, it represented Wednesday Journal's first foray into Chicago neighborhood publishing. The Chicago Journal had a distinctive look for a community paper—it was a broadsheet, and printed on peach newsprint.

During its widest circulation period, Chicago Journal covered the South Loop, Printers Row, Motor Row, Chinatown, New East Side, West Loop Gate, West Loop, Near West Side, Greektown, Little Italy, University Village and Pilsen neighborhoods. It was the most widely circulated Wednesday Journal city newspaper with circulation of 13,000.

In December 2012, the Chicago Journal announced in their print editions and website that the newspaper would cease publication that month. The final issue was distributed on December 12, 2012.

=== Chicago Parent Magazine ===
Founded in 1984, this free monthly magazine is distributed throughout Chicago and its suburbs. Wednesday Journal, Inc. published Chicago Parent for thirty years before selling the magazine to the Zoe Communications , owner of Detroit's Metro Parent magazine, in 2019.

=== News-Star ===
Beginning as separate News and Star editions, later combined, the News-Star (also called the News and Star Budget) covered the Far North Side. In 2005, Pioneer Press sold the nameplate to the Wednesday Journal, which resold it to Inside Publications in 2008 .

Communities covered by the various versions included Albany Park, Edgewater, Lake View, Lincoln Square, North Park, North Town, Ravenswood, Rogers Park, Sauganash and Uptown. The Wednesday Journal-published editions covered Edgewater, Ravenswood, Rogers Park and Uptown.

Lesley Sussman, now an author and journalist in New York City, was for many years editor of the Uptown and Edgewater News.

=== Westside Journal ===
Westside Journal, also known as West Side Chicago Journal, was the edition of Chicago Journal that served Wicker Park, Bucktown, Ukrainian Village, East Village and West Town neighborhoods. It was cancelled in 2008 when the Wednesday Journal management determined that it didn't generate enough ad revenue to justify its existence.
