= Lerner Newspapers =

Chain of weekly newspapers in Chicago

- Founded: 1926
- Founder: Leo Lerner (founding owner)
- Defunct: 2005
- Country of origin: United States
- Headquarters location: Chicago
- Publication types: Weekly newspapers, community journalism

Lerner Newspapers was a chain of weekly newspapers. Founded by Leo Lerner, the chain was an important contributor to community journalism in Chicago from 1926 to 2005 and called itself "the world's largest newspaper group".

In its heyday, Lerner published 54 weekly and semi-weekly editions on the North and Northwest sides of Chicago and in suburban Cook, Lake and DuPage counties, with a circulation of some 300,000. Editions included the Booster, Citizen, Life, News, News-Star, Skyline, Star, Times and Voice.

== Overview ==
The Lerner papers focused on community news and local issues, including a police blotter, arts and entertainment, food, lifestyles and high-school and neighborhood sports, like "hyper-local" versions of daily newspapers.

At one time, the chain had its own printing plant at its headquarters in the Rogers Park, Chicago, neighborhood and a network of satellite offices throughout the city and its suburbs.

Journalists who got their start at Lerner include Mike Royko, Greg Hinz, Bill Zwecker, Robert Feder, Bruce Wolf, William Brashler, Robert C. Koehler, and Ted Allen.

== History ==
=== Beginnings ===
Leo Lerner (1907–1965) founded his namesake chain in 1926 with the Lincoln-Belmont Booster, turning it from a shopper to a complete newspaper.

From 1924 to 1928, Lerner worked in editorial positions on the Morton Grove News, the North Side Sunday Citizen and the Lincoln Belmont Booster. He then became a partner of A. O. Caplan in the management of the sixteen Myers Newspapers, with a combined circulation of 219,000.

During World War II, Lerner instructed his staff to concentrate on local news with the statement "a fistfight on Clark Street is more important to our readers than a war in Europe."

By 1958, Lerner was president of a growing group of newspapers, including the Myers Publishing Co., the Lincoln Belmont Publishing Co., the Times Home Newspapers (J. L. Johnson Publishing Co.) and the Neighbor Press of Chicago.

Lerner's son Louis A. Lerner served as assistant to the publisher of Lerner Home Newspapers and an account executive for Times Home Newspapers from 1959 to 1962. He became executive vice president of Lerner Home Newspapers in 1962 and publisher in 1969.

=== Decline ===
The 49-year-old Louis Lerner died of cancer in 1984. The following year, the Lerner family sold the chain to Pulitzer Publishing, publishers of the St. Louis Post-Dispatch. When it bought the chain of 52 weeklies for $9.1 million, Pulitzer hoped to win readers and advertising dollars from the Chicago Tribune and Chicago Sun-Times in the same way that the Suburban Journal weeklies were weakening the Post-Dispatch. Pulitzer planned to increase Lerner's combined circulation of about 300,000 to compete in the Chicago newspaper market, but the recession of the early 1990s eroded the chain's advertising base, over half of which was help-wanted classified ads, and the chain was unsuccessful in winning automotive and real estate ads away from the dailies.

Pulitzer refocused their efforts away from Lerner and gradually closed and merged many of its editions until only 15 were left. Circulation had plummeted from 300,000 in 1985 to 100,000 by 1992. In 1992, Pulitzer was on the brink of shutting down the Lerner papers but, at the last minute, with final editions set in type, sold the chain's assets to Sunstates Corp. for a reported $4 million.

Sunstates, an investment firm led by Clyde Engle, was in the business of buying moribund companies to enact complex financial operations. Under Sunstates, which owned a mixed bag of companies such as an insurance firm, a chocolate factory, a furniture factory and an apple orchard, but had never before operated newspapers. The Lerner chain's business continued to erode while Sunstates managers constrained journalists to keep 9-to-5 hours as a cost saving measure.

In 2000, in a surreptitious arrangement that came to be known as the "Lerner Exchange," Sunstates sold the chain to a company fronted by Canadian press baron Conrad Black, who quickly resold it to Hollinger International. This and other illegal maneuvers by Black and sidekick David Radler, Sun-Times publisher, ultimately led to their conviction on fraud charges when they were found to have looted millions from the company.

Amid Hollinger's reorganization after the scandal, Lerner Newspapers was merged into its longtime suburban rival, Pioneer Press, in 2005. Pioneer management discontinued the Lerner name and canceled all of Lerner's suburban editions. Pioneer continued to print a handful of City of Chicago newspapers with the old nameplates — the Booster, News-Star, Skyline and Times — converting them from broadsheet to tabloid, until January 2008, when the company announced it was pulling out of urban publishing entirely. At the last moment, the Booster, News-Star and Skyline titles were sold to the Wednesday Journal, another Chicago-area weekly group.

In March 2009, the Wednesday Journal announced that it was dropping the News-Star and the Booster, along with the Bucktown/Wicker Park edition of the Chicago Journal (into which a Booster edition had been merged). Although reduced to operating from his home, Ron Roenigk, the publisher of Inside Publications, said he would be buying the two former Lerner nameplates, largely to get their legal advertising.

The Skyline, Inside Booster and News Star were still published as weekly North Side of Chicago print editions, by Inside Publications, since 2009 as of 2024.

== Editions ==
=== Booster ===
Leo Lerner launched his empire with the 1926 purchase of the Lincoln-Belmont Booster. In 2005, Pioneer Press sold The Booster to the Wednesday Journal, which resold it in 2008 to Inside Publications. Inside Publications merged the Booster with its primary publication (Inside). The new publication retained the Booster's numbering and some of its syndicated columns while incorporating some of Inside's traditional features.

The Booster covered various North Side neighborhoods, including Avondale, Irving Park, Lake View, Lincoln-Belmont, Lincoln Park, Logan-Armitage, North Center, Roscoe Village and Sheridan Center. The Wednesday Journal-published editions covered Lake View, North Center and Roscoe Village.

Longtime Chicago columnist (Chicago Daily News, Chicago Sun-Times, Chicago Tribune) Mike Royko had his start at the Lincoln-Belmont Booster.

=== Citizen ===
Founded as the Ravenswood Citizen, and dating back until at least 1905, the Citizen was acquired by Lerner in the late 1920s and folded into other editions in 1930.

=== Life ===
The Life newspapers ran from the 1920s through 2005, beginning with a Rogers Park edition, and later expanding into covering Chicago's northern suburbs, including, at various times, Buffalo Grove, Deerfield, Des Plaines, Evanston, Ft. Sheridan, Glenview, Highland Park, Highwood, Lake County, Lake Forest, Lincolnwood, Morton Grove, Niles, Niles Township, Northbrook, Skokie and Wheeling.

Pulitzer shut down most of the Life editions in the 1980s. When Pioneer Press folded the papers in 2005, editions covered Lincolnwood, Morton Grove, Niles and Skokie.

=== News-Star ===
Beginning as separate News and Star editions, later combined, the News-Star (also called the News and Star Budget) covered the Far North Side. In 2005, Pioneer Press sold the nameplate to the Wednesday Journal, which resold it in 2008 to Inside Publications.

Communities covered by the various versions included Albany Park, Edgewater, Lake View, Lincoln Square, North Park, North Town, Ravenswood, Rogers Park, Sauganash and Uptown. The Wednesday Journal-published editions covered Edgewater, Ravenswood, Rogers Park and Uptown.

Lesley Sussman, now an author and journalist in New York City, was for many years editor of the Uptown and Edgewater News.

=== Skyline ===
Launched by Lerner in the 1960s, the Skyline covered the Gold Coast, Lincoln Park, the Loop and the Near North Side, with an emphasis on society gossip. The Skyline was the only Lerner paper not to cover school sports. In 2005, Pioneer Press sold the nameplate to the Wednesday Journal, which continues to publish it, covering the Gold Coast, Lincoln Park, Old Town and River North.

Queer Eye's Allen was a Skyline reporter. Wednesday's Journal sold the Skyline to Inside Publications in 2013 where it is still being published weekly.

=== Times ===
Acquired in the 1950s, and also called the New Times and the Times Home Newspapers, the Times editions covered the Northwest Side and near-west suburbs, including the city neighborhoods Albany Park, Belmont-Cragin, Dunning, Edison Park, Edgebrook, Harlem-Foster, Harlem-Irving, Higgins-Oriole, Jefferson Park, Logan Square, Mayfair, Montrose, O'Hare, Norwood Park and Portage Park and suburban areas including Elmwood Park, Franklin Park, Harwood Heights, Norridge, Northlake, River Grove, Schiller Park and Leyden and Proviso townships.

At the time Pioneer Press took over and folded the papers in 2005, the Times covered Edison Park, Jefferson Park, Norwood Park and Portage Park in the city and the suburban communities of Elmwood Park, Harwood Heights, Norridge and River Grove.

=== Voice ===
Sometimes called the Voice and Advisor Register, the original Voice editions covered Chicago's northwest suburbs, including Addison, Bartlett, Bensenville, Bloomingdale, DuPage County, Elk Grove Village, Glendale Heights, Hanover Park, Hoffman Estates, Itasca, Medinah, Roselle, Rosemont, Schaumburg, Streamwood and Wood Dale.

Pulitzer shut the original Voice down in 1990.

In the mid-1990s, Sunstates reused the Voice name for a small, short-lived group of north suburban tabloids, launched as shoppers, and then expanded into regular editions covering community news and features, with longtime Chicago journalist Leah A. Zeldes as managing editor. The tabloids covered Glenview, Northbrook and Park Ridge.

== Journalists ==
Prominent journalists who worked for Lerner Newspapers include:

- Ted Allen
- David Anderson
- Ann Barzel
- Richard Battin
- Al Bernstein
- Lawrence Bommer
- Jack Bess
- Larry Blasko, later a reporter and executive with the Associated Press
- Bill Brashler
- Jim Braun
- Patrick Butler
- Angela Caputo
- George Castle
- Corey Schiff
- Dan Cotter
- Steve Dale
- Felicia Dechter
- Diana Diamond
- Leonard Dubkin
- Ava Ehrlich
- Robert Feder
- Ruth Duskin Feldman
- Roger Flaherty, later a rewriteman, reporter and assistant metro editor at Chicago Sun-Times
- Ann Gerber
- Michael C. Glab
- Terry Gorman
- Richard Greb
- Leigh Hanlon
- Greg Hinz
- Sheldon Hoffenberg
- Audrey Howard
- James Clifford Hughes
- Les Jacobson
- William Hugh Jones
- Robert C. Koehler
- Leo Lerner
- Louis A. Lerner
- Richard C. Lindberg
- Cynthia Linton
- Valerie Anne Long
- Sheila Malkind
- Richard Jules Margolis
- Sue Markgraf
- Matt McGuire
- Dan Mitchell
- Kim Okabe
- Mary Beth Rose
- Matt Rosenberg
- Morris Rotman
- Art Rotstein, later an Associated Press reporter based in Arizona
- Mike Royko
- Rosemary Sazanoff
- Brenda Schory
- "Chicago Ed" Schwartz
- Emily Soloff
- Will Sullivan
- Lesley Sussman
- Lorraine Swanson
- Lily Venson
- Carolyn Walkup
- Bruce Wolf
- Leah A. Zeldes
- Bill Zwecker

== See also ==
- Illinois Newspaper Project
- Newspapers of the Chicago metropolitan area
