= Sally Insul =

American actress

- Born: October 3, 1916; Chicago, Illinois, U.S.
- Died: August 4, 2008 (aged 91); Los Angeles, California, U.S.
- Occupation: Actress

Sally Insul (October 3, 1916 – August 4, 2008) was an American actress who appeared in over fifty different television and film roles during her career.

Insul was born and raised in Chicago, Illinois. She wrote and directed her first play when she was 16 years old. She received her degree from Wilbur Wright College, but also trained at the Goodman Theatre, one of Chicago's oldest theatrical institutions.

Insul's television credits included roles in well known series including The X-Files, Wings, Baywatch, Golden Girls, Gilmore Girls, Frasier, Everybody Loves Raymond, My Name is Earl, Beverly Hills, 90210 and Seinfeld.

Her film credits included The Wedding Planner, The Wedding Singer, L.A. Confidential, Primary Colors and Old School. Later in her career, she appeared as Aunt Peggy in the 2006 film, Click, opposite Adam Sandler. She was also regularly cast in a series of film roles by the Coen brothers.

Despite her film and television roles, Insul remained active in the theater throughout her career. She performed with the Platinum Players in Beverly Hills, California, in April 2008. Insul, a SAG member, also volunteered at the University of California, Los Angeles.

Insul died of heart failure in Los Angeles August 4, 2008, at age 91. Her husband, Herbert K. Insul, predeceased her. She was buried at Hillside Memorial Park Cemetery in Culver City, California.
