= Boss (book) =

1971 book by Mike Royko

- Author: Mike Royko
- Language: English
- Genre: non-fiction
- Publisher: E.P. Dutton & Co. (hardcover), Signet/New American Library (paper)
- Publication date: 1971
- Publication place: United States
- LC Class: 79-133585

Boss: Richard J. Daley of Chicago is a 1971 non-fiction book by Chicago Daily News columnist Mike Royko, about six-term Chicago mayor Richard J. Daley (1902–1976) and the political machine and municipal government over which Daley presided.

== Overview ==
Boss outlines Daley's Irish working-class origins and his step-by-step rise through the rough-and-tumble hierarchy of the Chicago Democratic party machine, until he was first elected mayor in 1955 and went on to become influential in national politics. The book describes patronage and political strong-arm tactics in vivid detail and contains stinging depictions of precinct captains, aldermen, bureaucrats, judges, the Chicago Police Department, and of Daley himself. The final chapters cover the turbulent 1960s, with social unrest surrounding the Civil Rights Movement, violent confrontations between protesters and authorities, and the notorious, rowdy Chicago Democratic convention in 1968. The book concludes in 1970 with a determined, unrepentant Mayor Daley still in office.

== Reception ==
Public and critical reception of Boss was solidly favorable and the book spent 26 weeks on The New York Times Best Seller list, from April 4 through September 26, 1971.

Writing in The New York Times, Studs Terkel praised Royko as "Chicago's most incisive and impertinent journalist since Finley Peter Dunne" and added "only he could have written this book". Royko, said Terkel, writes with "a street wit, an elegant irony and a cool, though far from detached, indignation" to produce "a stunning portrait" that "probes not only into the psyche of a neighborhood bully but into the nature of the city that has so honored him".

Publishers Weekly called Boss a "classic" that gives "a detailed and, for some, eye-opening account of Daley's rise to absolute control of the Chicago Democratic political machine", adding that it "provides sardonic and sometimes hilarious reading".

Kirkus Reviews said that Royko "convincingly and energetically" describes Daley's rise and the many scandals and intrigues threaded through his career. "Without either sentimentality or moralism, Royko traces the integuments of machine politics: key offices; the significance of each scandal; the way Daley has used his dual status as party chairman and mayor to consolidate a one-man rule any Soviet apparatchik would envy".

In a retrospective 2012 review in The Huffington Post, Keith Koeneman (biographer of Daley's son, Richard M. Daley) recommended Boss as "one of the great books of American literature", saying it "has the qualities of a perfect photograph, capturing the unique essence of a person at a particular—and fleeting—moment in time".
