= The Skeleton News =

The Skeleton was a free independent monthly compact newspaper published in Chicago, Illinois, US from 2006 to 2008. It was started by Chicago underground writer Liam Warfield in Pilsen. Its first issue, #00, was published on October 27, 2006. Its first anniversary issue was released in October 2007 under a theme of "Failure" and in Fall of 2008, the paper released its final issue under the theme of "Success". Archived by both The Chicago Underground Library and The Chicago Public Library, the paper has been characterized as a small but notable press, having acquired celebrity interviews with academics and artists including Loren Coleman and Patti Smith, while refusing online content and non-local advertising.
