= Ruth Duskin Feldman =

American author and Quiz Kid

- Born: Ruth Sondra Duskin; June 13, 1934; Chicago, Illinois, U.S.
- Died: May 18, 2015 (aged 80); Ontario, California, U.S.
- Education: Northwestern University
- Occupation: Author
- Spouse: Gilbert Feldman (m. 1953)
- Writing career
- Genre: non-fiction.

Ruth Duskin Feldman (née Ruth Sondra Duskin, June 13, 1934 – May 18, 2015) was a Quiz Kid, author and editor. She was a regular panelist on the Quiz Kids radio show from age 7 until age 16. She wrote and edited several books, including one about her experience on the show.

== Childhood ==
Ruth could read chemistry books by age 5, and write poetry by age 7. In 1941, at age 7, she joined the Quiz Kids, a quiz radio show featuring gifted child panelists. Her cute appearance and strong command of literature and chemistry made her a favorite among the show's audience. She appeared in 146 episodes of the radio show, and 11 of the television version.

At age 13, she wrote her first book, a novel about chemistry entitled Chemi, the Magician (Dodd, Mead, and Company, 1947). She attended the Chicago Lab School as a teenager, gradually reducing her investment in the Quiz Kids. She left the show at age 16 and attended Northwestern University while continuing to be a panelist on radio and TV shows.

== Later life ==
Later in life, she published a book, Whatever Happened to the Quiz Kids? Perils and Profits of Growing Up Gifted, about her and her fellow Quiz Kids' experiences during and after the show. She also coauthored two textbooks on human development and child development, Human Development and A Child’s World: Infancy Through Adolescence, worked for Lerner Newspapers, and edited the journal of the Society for Humanistic Judaism.

She died in 2015.
