= Neighborhood Newspaper Group =

American newspaper publisher, founded 2007

Journal News/City Newshound
- Type: Weekly newspaper, community journalism
- Format: Broadsheet
- Owner: Susan Malone Qualter
- Publisher: Susan Malone Qualter
- Staff writers: Kenneth R Qualter
- Founded: 2007 as Neighborhood Newspaper Group, holding: *Journal News (1937); *City Newshound (2005)
- Headquarters: 6219 W 63rd Street; Chicago, IL
- Circulation: 20,000

Community areas in Chicago, including the five Southwest Chicago areas (the top row, left to right, of those marked in orange) served by Journal News and City Newshound

Neighborhood Newspaper Group is the community newspaper publisher based on the Southwest Side of Chicago. The group currently publishes the Journal News, which covers Archer Heights, Brighton Park and McKinley Park, and City Newshound which covers Clearing and Garfield Ridge. Both papers are released weekly every Wednesday. The Journal News was known as Back of the Yards Journal, serving a single neighborhood within the Southwest community of New City, until February 2008, when the publisher moved its headquarters west and expanded focus to a larger area of the Southwest Side.

== History ==
The Back of the Yards Journal was established in January 1937. Originally designed to serve the Back of the Yards neighborhood, its coverage gradually expanded to ethnic white neighborhoods further west. The paper was headquartered at the strip mall near 47th and Damen.

As the Back of the Yards Journal's demographics changed, the paper struggled to remain relevant to the neighborhood population. The focus shifted away from Back of the Yards. Back of the Yards Community Council tried to persuade the Journal to adapt a bilingual approach, but the publisher believed that doing so wouldn't be profitable for the paper.

In 2005, Susan Malone, the Editor-in-Chief of Back of the Yards Journal, left the paper to form the City Newshound community newspaper. Based in Garfield Ridge neighborhood, at 7019 W Archer Avenue, the paper set out to cover Garfield Ridge and Clearing. A proponent of protecting pets, Malone devoted considerable space to pet-related articles, and maintained the policy of publishing 'lost pet' ads for free.

In August 2007, Malone acquired Back of the Yards Journal and moved its headquarters to City Newshound's location. By this point, the paper's coverage primarily focused on Brighton Park, Archer Heights, McKinley Park and Bridgeport. In February 2007, Back of the Yards Journal was renamed Journal News to reflect that.

During the summer of 2012, Neighborhood News Group moved its headquarters to a 2-story building in the Clearing neighborhood.

In the November 14, 2013 issue, Neighborhood News Group announced a partnership between City Newshound and Southwest Chicago Post, a neighborhood news blog that covers the same neighborhoods. City Newshound then started publishing the Post's crime coverage, while the Post added PDF copies of the Newshound to its website.

== Regular features ==
Journal News and City Newshound are both largely made up of classifieds and press releases/news bulletins issued by businesses and community organizations from their respective coverage areas. However, the publisher still produces some original content, including occasional news articles and regular columns. As of August 2012, they included:

- "Meet Your Neighbor" - a profile of a noteworthy individual or community organization from the papers' coverage area.
- "Music Corner" - a column by Ken Qualter offers music reviews and discussions of music-related topics.
- "Poet's Pen" - features poetry created by area writers.

Past columns include:

- "Sporthound" - a column by Nick Matlovich discusses sports-related news and topics.
- "Paw Prints" - a column on pets-related topics. Written by the company's advertising manager/community liaison Julia Ferrel, it was retired when she died in July 2012.
