= Pioneer Press =

Illinois newspaper publisher

The Pioneer Press publishes 32 local newspapers in the Chicago area. It is a division of Tribune Publishing, and is based in Chicago.

The community newspapers are the main source of local news in Illinois communities such as Winnetka, Highland Park, and Lake Forest.

== Pioneer Press community newspapers ==
The following is a listing of all Pioneer Press Chicago newspapers, as of 2014:

- Barrington Courier-Review
- Buffalo Grove Countryside
- Deerfield Review
- The Doings Clarendon Hills
- The Doings Hinsdale
- The Doings La Grange
- The Doings Oak Brook
- The Doings Weekly
- The Doings Western Springs
- Elm Leaves
- Evanston Review
- Forest Leaves
- Franklin Park Herald Journal
- Glencoe News
- Glenview Announcements
- Highland Park News
- Lake Forester
- Lake Zurich Courier
- Libertyville Review
- Lincolnshire Review
- Lincolnwood Review
- Morton Grove Champion
- Mundelein Review
- Niles Herald-Spectator
- Norridge Harwood Heights News
- Northbrook Star
- Oak Leaves
- Park Ridge Herald Advocate
- Skokie Review
- Vernon Hills Review
- Wilmette Life
- Winnetka Talk

== History ==
In 2005, Hollinger merged the 80-year-old Lerner Newspapers chain into Pioneer Press, Pioneer's first real inroads into the city of Chicago. Despite announcements by Publisher Larry Green that Pioneer intended to "grow" the Lerner Papers, over the course of the next six months, Pioneer dumped the venerable Lerner name, shut down most of its editions and laid off most of its employees. Subsequently, the Sun-Times ceased production of Skyline, the Booster and News-Star, the remaining members of the Lerner group, eliminated the jobs, and sold the titles to Oak Park-based Wednesday Journal. In 2014, the Pioneer Press newspapers were sold to the Chicago Tribune Media Group.
