= Leo Lerner =

American journalist

Leo A. Lerner (1907–1965) was an American newspaper editor and publisher, who founded Lerner Newspapers in Chicago, Illinois, at one time the largest chain of weekly newspapers in the world.

He was a staunch advocate of community journalism, fond of statements like, "A fistfight on Clark Street is more important to our readers than a war in Europe."

== Newspaper career ==
Born in Chicago, Lerner attended Northwestern University, graduating in 1928. While there he was the Night Editor and Drama Editor for the Daily Northwestern. After graduation he worked for several local Chicago papers until the late 1940s, and was the only neighborhood newspaperman accredited by the State Department to cover the United Nations Conference at San Francisco in 1945. In the late 1940s he partnered with A. O. Caplan to become owner and manager of sixteen local papers, with a total circulation of 219,000. By 1958 Lerner was president, editor, and publisher of four newspaper conglomerates with more than 19 different papers.

== Public service ==
Lerner was very active in public service. He was a member of the board of directors of the Chicago Public Library and of Americans for Democratic Action, founder of the Independent Voters of Illinois (IVI), and president of the Citizens Schools Committee. He helped found Roosevelt University, where he taught journalism and eventually became president of its board of trustees. He was a member of the board of trustees of the Scandinavian Seminar, which funded nine months of study in any Scandinavian country for qualified students. He was a member of the board of the Chicago Better Business Bureau and was appointed to the Illinois Parole and Pardon Board. In 1964 President Lyndon B. Johnson invited him to join the Citizens Advisory Board of the Community Relations Service.

== Awards ==
- Chicago Medal of Merit (1961)
- Editorial Award, Illinois Press Association (1937)
- National Herrick Award (1951)
- Publisher of the Year Award (1953)

== Bibliography ==
- Continental Journey (1947), written during a tour of Europe
- The Itch of Opinion (1956)
- The Italics Are Mine (1960)
- The Truth Ripens (1967)
