= George Castle (journalist) =

American sports journalist

George Castle is an American freelance sports journalist and author, based in Chicago, Illinois.

Castle's most frequent assignment has been as the Chicago Cubs beat writer for The Times of Northwest Indiana. He spent many years as a sportswriter for Chicago's Lerner Newspapers.

He has written several books about the Cubs and general baseball history, including:

- The Million to One Team
- Where Have All Our Cubs Gone?
- Baseball and The Media: How Fans Lose in Today’s Coverage of the Game
- Entangled in Ivy.
- Jackie Robinson West: The Triumph and Tragedy of America's Favorite Little League Team.
- Baseball's Game Changers: Icons, Record Breakers, Scandals, Sensational Series, and MoreBaseball's Game Changers: Icons, Record Breakers, Scandals, Sensational Series, and More
