= Venson =

Venson is both a given name and a surname. Notable people with the name include:

- Lily Venson (1924–2011), American journalist
- Pelonomi Venson-Moitoi (born 1951), Botswana politician and journalist
- Venson Hamilton (born 1977), American basketball player

== See also ==
- Henson (name)
