= Fitzrovia News =

- Fitzrovia News front page from March 2014
- Type: Quarterly newspaper
- Format: Freesheet
- Language: English
- ISSN: 0967-1404
- Website: https://fitzrovianews.com

The Fitzrovia News is a free community newspaper produced by volunteers living and working in Fitzrovia, London, United Kingdom. It is an example of what has been called hyperlocal media or community journalism. It is notable because it is "one of the country's oldest community newspapers".

It is a non-profit news media published by the Fitzrovia Community Newspaper Group, with support from central London charity the Fitzrovia Neighbourhood Association as part of its charitable work.

The Fitzrovia News was originally called The Tower and was started by a group of community activists in April 1973 in response to threats to their neighbourhood from building developers and the loss of housing. The name Tower was a reference to the Post Office Tower now the BT Tower which stands near the geographic heart of the neighbourhood. The Tower was produced from the flat of Judith Thomas, a local resident. The paper was renamed Fitzrovia News in 1980 when it was produced by the Fitzrovia Community Newspaper Group from the recently established Fitzrovia Neighbourhood Centre.

The printed paper is produced four times a year. It is left at distribution points in the London neighbourhood of Fitzrovia. The website is updated more frequently and the editors produce a monthly email newsletter to subscribers. Like many hyperlocal media, the Fitzrovia News makes extensive use of freely available digital media: blog software WordPress and social media Twitter, Facebook, and Instagram.

Fitzrovia News covers all aspects of life in Fitzrovia with news and features about housing, business, environment, people, events, history and culture. "It has pursued stories about the impact of rising property prices and local hospital workers losing their homes, and submitted freedom of information requests to the local council."

Until April 2020 the newspaper was led by editor Mike Pentelow, an author and former trade union journalist.
