= Wilbur Wright College =

Community college in Chicago, Illinois, US

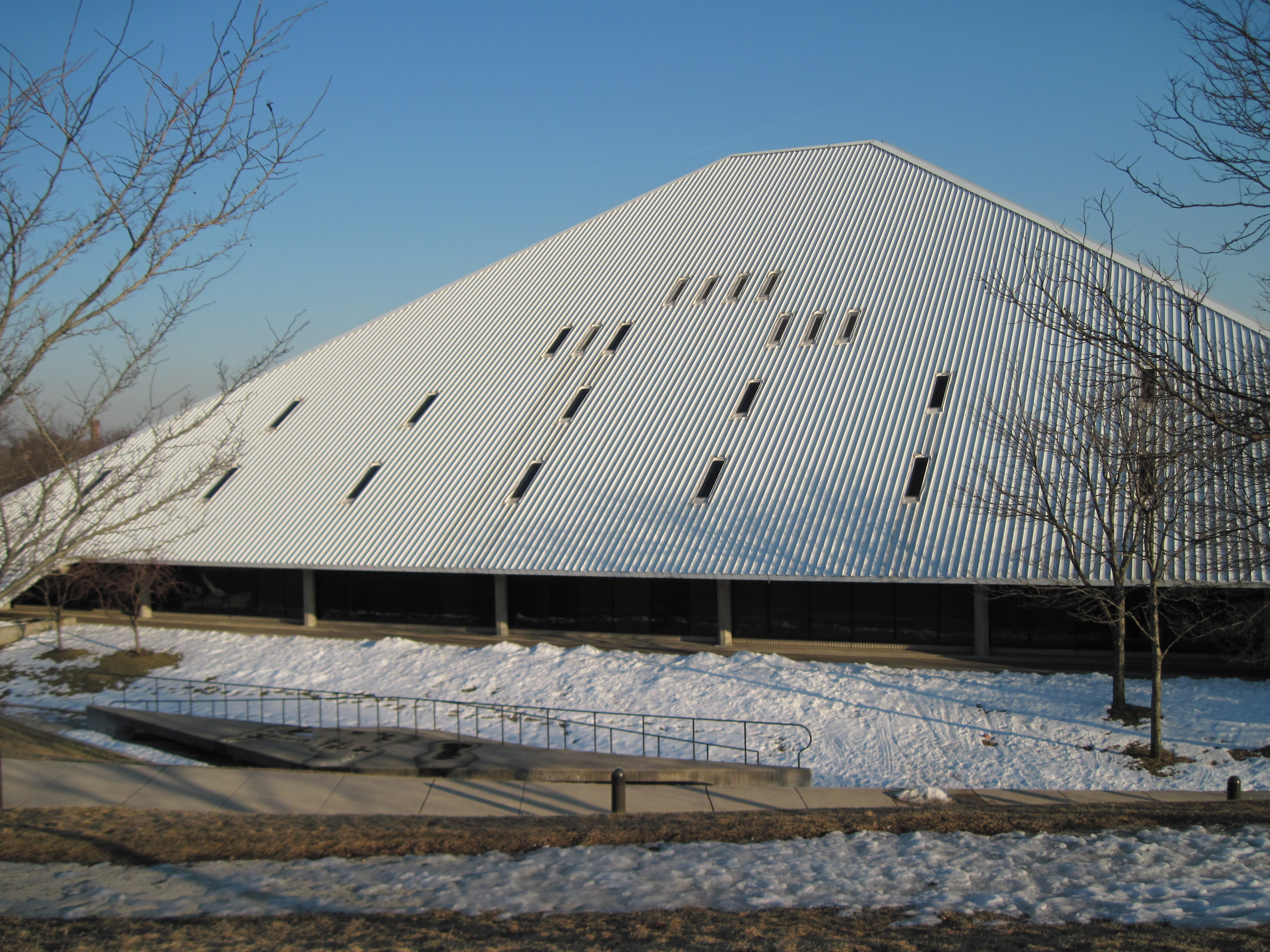
- Learning Resource Center at Wright's Narragansett campus
- Former name: Wright Junior College
- Motto: Education that Works
- Type: Community
- Established: 1934; 92 years ago
- Affiliations: City Colleges of Chicago
- Chancellor: Juan Salgado
- President: Andres Oroz
- Vice-president: Gabe Estill
- Students: 9,367
- Location: Chicago, Illinois, U.S. 41°57′31.8″N 87°47′17.9″W
- Campus: Large city
- Colors: Brown, grey
- Mascot: Rams
- Website: ccc.edu/wright

Wilbur Wright College is a public municipal community college in the Dunning community area in the northwestern side of Chicago, Illinois, United States. It is part of the City Colleges of Chicago system.

It offers two-year associate's degrees, as well as occupational training in IT, manufacturing, medical, cyber tech, and business fields. Its main campus is located on Chicago's Northwest Side in the Dunning neighborhood.

== History ==
Wilbur Wright College was established in 1934 by the Chicago Board of Education as one of the system of three city junior colleges designed to serve the post-secondary educational needs of Chicago residents. For a three-year period during World War II, the United States Navy leased the facilities and trained thousands of men as part of the Electronics Training Program. The college remained in its initial location at 3400 N. Austin Ave. until moving to a new campus in 1993.

In 1966, Wright and the other city colleges were reorganized into a new community college district, named the City Colleges of Chicago, with its own Board of Trustees and taxing authority. This system includes colleges which, in turn, are a part of the State system comprising 40 public community college districts and 49 individual colleges. In 1996, Wilbur Wright College was named an HSI, serving a 25% or larger Latine population, by HACU.

Under the City Colleges of Chicago's new college to Careers initiative, Wright is City Colleges of Chicago's hub for Information Technology.

== Campus ==
Wright College was originally located in a large building at 3400 N. Austin Avenue, in Chicago. The original Wright campus is now home to the Chicago Academy Elementary School, the Chicago Academy High School, and the Academy for Urban School Leadership's central office. Due to needs for additional space and more specialized facilities, in 1993 it moved to a 23-acre parcel at 4300 N. Narragansett Avenue, at a cost of $90 million. The campus was designed by renowned Chicago-area architect Bertrand Goldberg In 2013, the school began a $3.5 million project to renovate and install new HVAC systems in the Learning Resource Center, a pyramid and one of the campus' landmarks.

Wright College is a leader in sustainability and was recognized as a Bronze Level Compact School in the Illinois Campus Sustainability Compact Program. The National Arbor Day Foundation has named Wright College as a Tree Campus USA for three consecutive years.

== Humboldt Park Vocational Center ==
Humboldt Park Vocational Center is a satellite site of Wright College and offers classes that teach adult basic education skills, vocational training and other programs. The facility offers a nine-month advanced certification program in computerized numerical control (CNC) machining. In 2012, the CNC machining program placed 100 percent of its graduates into jobs paying $40,000 a year, with the potential to jump to $55,000 to $65,000 in less than two years.

== Accreditation ==
Wilbur Wright College is accredited by the Higher Learning Commission and approved by the Illinois Community College Board and the Illinois Office of Education Department of Adult, Vocational, and Technical Education. The program in Radiography is accredited by the Joint Review Committee on Education in Radiologic Technology; the Business Department is accredited by the Association of Collegiate Business Schools and Programs; and the Occupational Therapy Assistant Program is accredited by the Accreditation Council for Occupational Therapy Education (ACOTE). The paralegal program is accredited by the American Bar Association.

== Notable alumni ==
- Jerry G. Bishop - Emmy Award-winning television personality
- Oscar Brashear - Jazz trumpeter
- Herbert C. Brown - Nobel Prize winner
- Dennis Franz - Emmy Award-winning actor
- Shecky Greene - Comedian
- Isaac Guillory - Folk guitarist
- Barbara Harris - Oscar-nominated actress
- Sally Insul - Actor
- M. Larry Lawrence - Hotelier and Ambassador to Switzerland
- Ted Lechowicz - Illinois politician
- Judith Leznaw - American virologist, medical researcher and academic
- Eric Morris - Actor, acting teacher
- Chuck Nergard - Member of Florida House of Representatives
- Akua Njeri - Activist and wife of Fred Hampton
- Kim Novak - Actress
- Ron Offen - Pulitzer Prize nominated poet, playwright, critic, and editor
- Bill Page - Lawrence Welk band leader, entrepreneur
- J.F. Powers - Novelist and short story author
- Mike Royko - Pulitzer Prize–winning journalist
- Al Schwartz (producer) - Emmy-nominated producer
- Bernard Stone - Alderman, mayoral candidate
- Lily Venson - Pulitzer Prize-nominated journalist
- Beverly Wisniewski - Comedian

== Notable faculty ==
- Ed Badger - Head basketball coach - Coach of the Chicago Bulls from 1976 to 1978
- Katherine Whitney Curtis - Swimming instructor - Founder of synchronized swimming
- Susan Fromberg Schaeffer - English instructor - National Book Award and O. Henry Prize nominated novelist and poet

== Miscellaneous ==
Wilbur Wright College is host to the Scholars at Wright program, a great books program funded by the National Endowment for the Humanities. Wilbur Wright College is host to the only ABA (American Bar Association)-approved Paralegal Studies Program at a public college in the City of Chicago.
