= Judith Lesnaw =

American biologist

Judith Alice Lesnaw is an American virologist, photographer, and inductee of the University of Kentucky's Hall of Fame. She was the first woman hired into Biology, the first woman to be tenure tenure, and the first molecular biologist at the University of Kentucky.

== Biography ==
Lesnaw was born in Chicago, Illinois to Leonard Josef and Virginia Dorothy (Hosford) Lesnaw. She has a younger sister, poet Virginia (Lesnaw) Hertzenberg.

Lesnaw earned her Associate of Arts from Wright Junior College. She then went on to earn a Bachelor of Science in microbiology and a doctorate in llBiology (1969) with a focus in Virology, and postdoctoral studies at the University of Illinois at Urbana–Champaign.

Lesnaw began working and researching at the University of Kentucky in 1974, where she became known as the "Virus Master" by her students. She particularly focused on viral proteins in order to develop gene therapy agents.

She was a member of the NIH Medical Biochemistry Study Section and co-program leader in the Markey Cancer Center at the University of Kentucky. She currently is professor emeritus at the University of Kentucky.

After retiring in 2010, Lesnaw moved to Wilmington, Delaware, to focus on photography, early music, and poetry. She had 11 photographs that qualified for the 2017 Projected Image-of-the-Year Awards as presented by the Delaware Photographic Society (DPS). She is an active DPS board member and serves as Director of Education.

== Selected publications ==
- Hammond, David C., Robert K. Evans, and Judith A. Lesnaw (1992). The L Protein of Vesicular Stomatitis Virus Transcription Complexes is Specifically Photolabeled by 5-Azido-uridine 5'-Triphosphate, an Analog of the RNA Polymerase Substrate Uridine 5'-Triphosphate. J. Gen. Virol. 73:61-66.
- Hammond, David C., Boyd E. Haley, and Judith A. Lesnaw (1992). Identification and Characterization of Serine/Threonine Protein Kinase Activity Intrinisic to the L Protein of VSV New Jersey. J. Gen Virol. 73:67-75.
- van den Heuvel, J.F.J.M., D.W. Thornbury, T.P. Pirone, and J.A. Lesnaw (1993). A simple and efficient procedure for the oral inoculation of Trichoplusia ni larvae with polyhedrin-negative recombinant baculovirus. J. Virol. Methods 42:207-216.
