= Ann Barzel =

American writer, critic and lecturer (1905–2007)

Ann Barzel (December 13, 1905 – February 12, 2007) was an American writer, critic and lecturer on dance.

== Biography ==
In 1920, Barzel moved to Chicago. Her first Chicago dance teachers were Mark Turbyfill and Adolph Bolm. From about 1931 to 1943, Barzel performed as a dancer. She studied various styles of dance in Chicago, New York, London, and Paris with Michel Fokine, Alexandre Volinine, Doris Humphrey, the School of American Ballet, Vecheslav Swoboda and Nicholas Legat. She danced in productions of the Chicago Civic Opera Ballet and danced with a group directed by Berenice Holmes.

In the 1940s, Barzel became a lecturer on dance, as well as a teacher of dance technique. She lectured on dance history at the University of Chicago, Columbia College Chicago, and many other institutions. During this time, she was also making a regular career out of reviewing dance, theatre, and nightclub events in Chicago. She was dance critic for the Chicago Times, 1946-1950, when she joined Chicago's American (a newspaper later renamed Chicago Today), 1951-1974. Barzel also wrote for Dance Magazine for 40 years, covering dance events in the Midwest for the magazine. She wrote for the Lerner Newspapers (Chicago weekly) from 1974 through 2003, for Ballet Review, Ballet Annual, Dance News, and for various other international dance publications.

Barzel was a founder of the Ballet Guild of Chicago. In 1979, she was granted the Governor's Award for service to the arts. She was placed on the lifetime honors list by the Chicago Dance Arts Coalition in 1986, was recipient of the 1994 Vaslav Nijinsky Medal sponsored by the Polish Artists Agency in Warsaw, and was sole honoree at the 1995 "Toast" to the Cultural Center, sponsored by Chicago's Department of Cultural Affairs.

== Sources ==
- Dunning, Jennifer- February 21, 2007: "Ann Barzel, 101, Dies; a Writer Whose Passion Was Dance" https://www.nytimes.com/2007/02/21/arts/dance/21barzel.html?_r=1&n=Top/Reference/Times%20Topics/Subjects/D/Dancing New York Times
- The Newberry Library- "Remembering Ann Barzel": https://web.archive.org/web/20081203002708/http://www.newberry.org/media/AnnBarzel.html
