= Quiz Kids =

Radio and television series

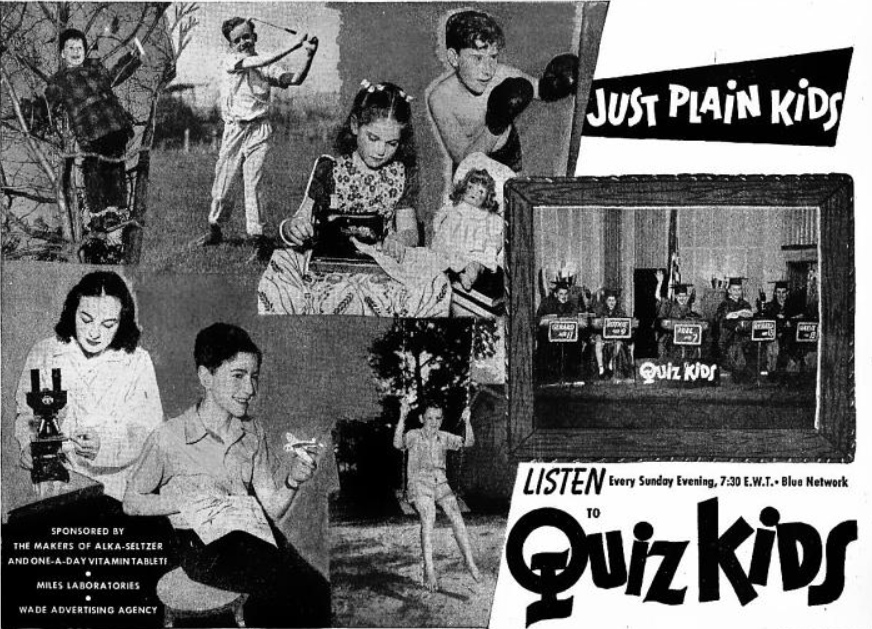
- 1944 advertisement for Quiz Kids radio show
- Genre: Educational
- Country of origin: United States
- Home station: NBC
- TV adaptations: NBC and CBS
- Hosted by: Joe Kelly; Clifton Fadiman; Durward Kirby; Milton Berle
- Created by: Louis G. Cowan
- Recording studio: Chicago; New York; Australia
- Original release: June 28, 1940 – September 27, 1956
- Sponsored by: Alka-Seltzer

Quiz Kids is a radio and TV series originally broadcast in the 1940s and 1950s. Created by Chicago public relations and advertising man Louis G. Cowan, and originally sponsored by Alka-Seltzer, the series was first broadcast on NBC from Chicago, June 28, 1940, airing as a summer replacement show for Alec Templeton Time. It continued on radio for the next 13 years. On television, the show was seen on NBC and CBS from July 6, 1949, to July 5, 1953, with Joe Kelly as quizmaster, and again from January 12 to September 27, 1956, with Clifton Fadiman as host.

The premise of the original show involved Kelly asking questions sent in by listeners and researched by Eliza Hickok and Rachel Stevenson. Kelly often said that he was not an intellectual, and that he could not have answered any of the questions without knowing the answer from his flash card. The answers were supplied by a panel of five children, chosen for their high IQs, strong academic interests, and appealing personalities, as well as such qualities as poise, quickness, and sense of humor. One of the first Quiz Kids was seven-year-old nature expert Gerard Darrow. For the initial premiere panel he was joined by Mary Ann Anderson, Joan Bishop, George Van Dyke Tiers and Charles Schwartz.

Other Quiz Kids of the 1940s included: Joan Alizier, Lois Jean Ashbeck, Jack Beckman, Claude Brenner, Geraldine Hamburg, Mary Clare McHugh, David Nasatir, Sally Ann Wilhelm, Ruth Duskin, war refugee Gunther Hollander, Shel Talmy, and math experts Joel Kupperman, Richard Williams, and Cynthia Cline. Panelists rotated, with the three top scorers each week joined by two others the following week; they were no longer eligible to participate once they reached the age of 16.

== New York and Chicago ==
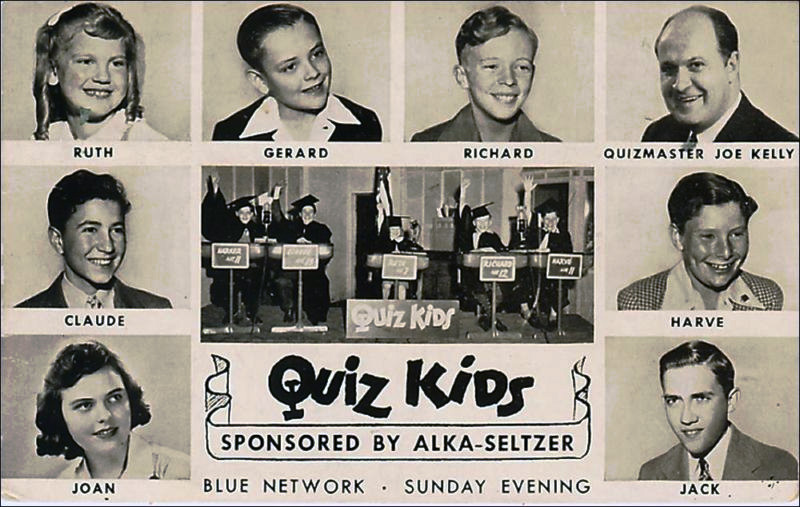
1940s postcard sent to listeners who submitted questions for the American radio show

In 1949–50 the program was expanded to New York, where a series of competitions determined the panelists. Students from the New York City area were chosen from questionnaires distributed to elementary schools, and were "interviewed" in panels where questions simulating those sent in by listeners were used. Those chosen from the interviews competed weekly for Quiz Kid of the month, with the two weekly winners from each show going on to the monthly "finals". Monthly winners later competed against each other on another panel, from which the overall winner was chosen. There were also parallel shows hosted by Durward Kirby, involving some of the same panelists. The shows hosted by Kirby were sponsored by The Dime Savings Bank of Brooklyn, and thus were called The Savings Bank Quiz Kids.

Norman Martin Kane, age nine, was the winner of the monthly competitions and went on the air in Chicago in one show with the Chicago group. Malcolm Mitchell, age 12, won the three competitions on the parallel series of shows, with Kane second each time, and was selected by the producers to be on several shows with the Chicago Quiz Kid group at NBC Studios in New York. These notably included one where the Kids defeated a group of university professors from New York in "general knowledge" topics. Mitchell, later a medical professor at Yale, had the special talent of "perfect pitch" (able to identify musical notes and chords with certainty), which made for interesting radio moments aside from answering straight questions.

A television program, now in The Paley Center for Media in New York and Los Angeles, was filmed in 1950 with Milton Berle as guest host and featured the Chicago Quiz Kids. The popularity of the television series never approached that of the radio programs, which first aired on Wednesday evenings and later on Sundays and had a devoted following of both adults and children. The Quiz Kids not only spawned a host of quiz shows starring both extraordinary and ordinary people, but also gave rise to the now more-popular term "Whiz Kids," first applied to the 1950 Philadelphia Phillies "Whiz Kids", and later to several cabinet members in the Kennedy Administration. One of the notable ex-Quiz Kids is the Nobel Prize-winning biologist James D. Watson. Others included actor and dialect coach Robert Easton, legendary Hollywood acting coach Roy London, producer Harve Bennett, poet Marilyn Hacker, Mayo Clinic Chief of Staff Richard Sedlack, and actress Vanessa Brown.

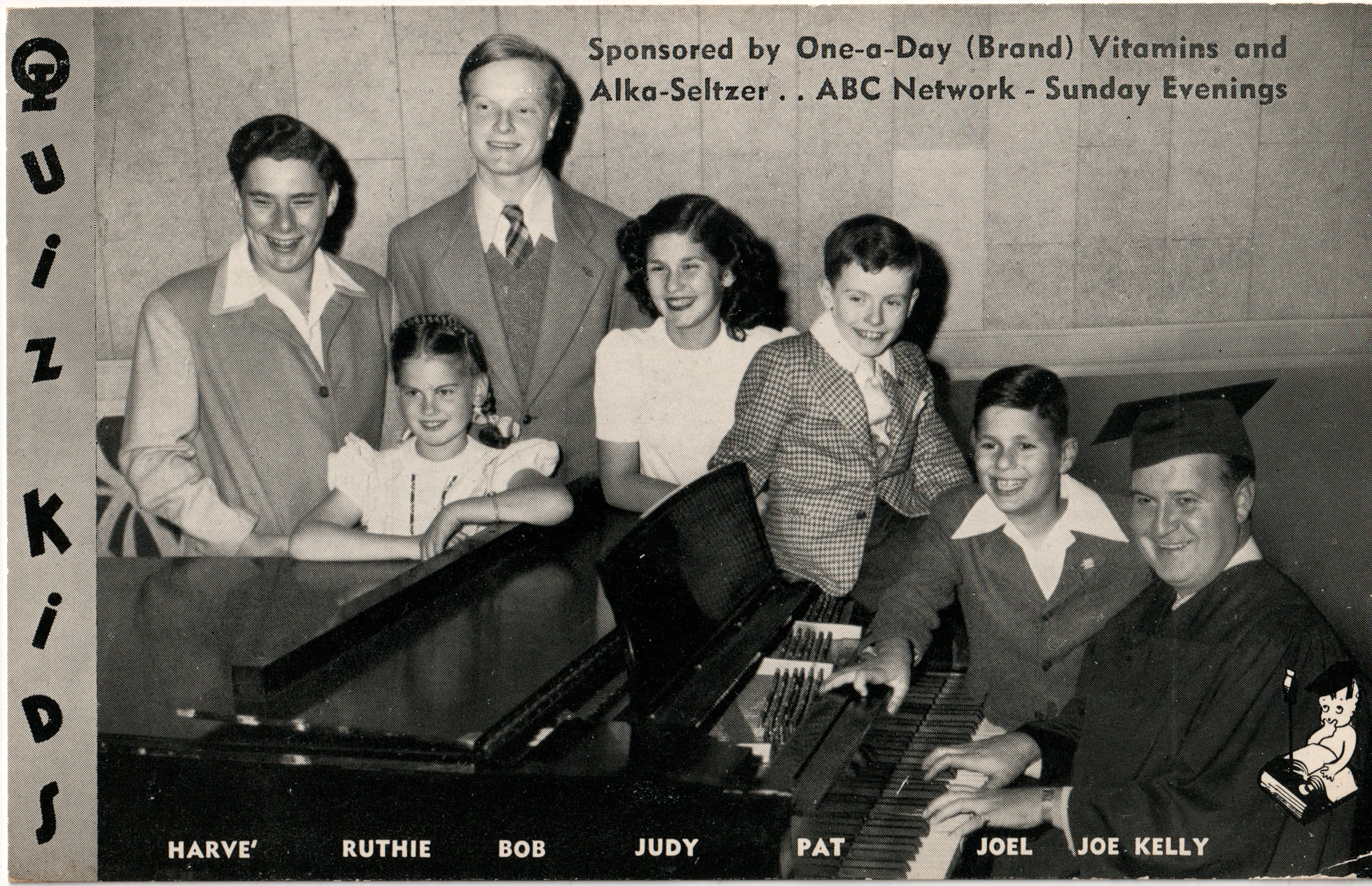
Quiz Kids promotional postcard sent to question submitters

== Later versions ==
Quiz Kids has been revived six times since the original television series:

- The New Quiz Kids aired in Canada from 1978 to 1979 on Global Television Network, hosted by Terry David Mulligan.
- In 1978, Jim McKrell hosted a weekly syndicated edition also titled The New Quiz Kids, which taped in Boston and ran for half a season.
- A later American revival aired from October 12, 1981 to December 15, 1982 on CBS Cable, hosted by Norman Lear.
- The Quiz Kids Challenge, which featured a panel of three kids playing against three adults, aired in daily syndication from September 10 to December 28, 1990. Jonathan Prince hosted this version while Johnny Gilbert served as announcer.
- Bay Area Quiz Kids is a San Francisco-area high school quiz bowl, aired on KRON-TV.
- CBS owned-and-operated station KNXT/KCBS-TV in Los Angeles produced their own version, titled Kidquiz, hosted by station weathercaster Maclovio Perez (now at KAVU-TV in Victoria, Texas). This version aired for eight years (1984–1992) on the station, usually prior to the start of CBS' Saturday morning programming.

== In Australia ==
An Australian radio program, after the American model, was first aired on Australian commercial radio in 1948. In 1952 John Dease began hosting Quiz Kids on 2GB, that ran every Sunday evening until 14 October 1962 (with an abortive attempt in 1956–57 to run concurrently on ATN-7 and GTV-9 weekly from 9 June 1957 to 10 November 1957) and transferred to ABC TV in March 1964.
