= Leonard Dubkin =

American author (1905–1972)

Leonard Dubkin (1905–1972) was an American author and self-taught naturalist from Chicago. He is best known for his books and newspaper columns about wildlife found in urban locations.

== Early life ==
Leonard Dubkin was born in 1905 in Odessa, Russia Empire. He came to the United States with his parents in 1907, and the family settled near West Side of Chicago, an area popular for Eastern-European Jewish immigrants. Dubkin was the oldest of seven, with a father who was chronically ill from lead poisoning. His mother supported the family with her sewing work, and the Dubkin family relied on Jewish charity organizations. In the eighth grade, Leonard dropped out of school to work and take care of his family. By the age of twelve, he was taking meticulous notes on the life histories of butterflies and moths.

Around the age of fifteen, Dubkin contracted encephalitis and lapsed into a year-long coma during which he resided at a sanatorium in Winfield, Illinois. After awakening from his coma, Dubkin slowly recovered by playing tennis, resulting in him eventually becoming a ranked player in the city public leagues.

He took an interest in nature from an early age and wrote a weekly nature column in the Saturday children's page of the Chicago Tribune. The social worker Jane Addams took an interest in him and gave him his first typewriter. This paved his way to a career in journalism.

"She read my article, which was about migratory instinct in birds. “Do you always write about nature?” she asked.

“Yes,” I said, “I’m going to be a naturalist when I grow up.”

“Don’t you think you need a typewriter to be a naturalist?”

“Sure I do. And some day I’m going to be able to afford to buy one.”

She asked me where I lived, and after I told her she walked away. A few days later a man delivered a package to our house, addressed to me. Inside was a brand new typewriter from the kind lady at Hull House. Her name was Jane Addams." - My Secret Places (1972)

== Career ==
Dubkin left Chicago as a young man, feeling determined to "cultivate the attitude and garner the life experiences he felt were necessary to [be] a writer", and traveled around the country by freighthopping. When he needed money, he would stop at a city and pick up work as a reporter for one of the local papers. He lived this lifestyle for approximately two years, reporting for papers such as the Times-Picayune and The Sacramento Bee.

Dubkin had difficulty committing to the topics assigned by editors in favor of observing nature. En route to cover a plane crash at Midway Airport, he stopped to observe a cricket singing in a field. By the time he got to the scene of the accident, all the survivors had been taken away. He missed another story by exploring a church tower where pigeons went to nest or die. On a pivotal case in which he was sent to interview a murder suspect, he became distracted by squirrels nesting in the walls of the suspect's home. Upon returning to the office without a scoop, he was fired from the Chicago Daily News.

During the Great Depression, Dubkin worked as a cab driver. In the 1930s, he launched a talent directory of Chicago stage and radio actors, which he updated and published annually until the mid-1950s. This successful business allowed him to write his novels, review books for the New York Times, and correspond with other nature writers, such as Rachel Carson, Euell Gibbons, and Edwin Way Teale.

In the following period of unemployment and occasional dispiriting office jobs, he took to observing nature closely instead of looking for work. Among the creatures he observed in Chicago were ballooning spiders, bats, crickets, Polyphemus Moths and Cecropia moths.

He eventually found work as an amateur naturalist, writing about his subject in a newspaper column with Lerner Newspapers and in his own books.

He authored six books, now out of print, about the natural history of Chicago, arguing for the preservation of secret places, small parks, and urban wildlife. He wrote a column called "The Birds and Bees" in the Lerner Newspapers, published between 1950 and 1972. During this time there was little to no nature writing taking place in Chicago - conservation efforts focused on larger suburban spaces, such as forest preserves.

He became a champion of everyday wildlife and promoted the idea that wildlife worth observing was not necessarily exotic.

A city park in Chicago is named for him, Dubkin Park, where he often ate lunch while working for the Lerner Newspapers. The park has a community garden, many species of native and non-native plants, and a blank wall along the CTA tracks. Before she died in 2016, his daughter planted a peony in his memory at the park. It is still there.

== Bibliography ==
- The Murmur of Wings (1944)
- Enchanted Streets (1947)
- The White Lady (1952)
- Wolf Point (1953)
- The Natural History of a Yard (1955) - resilience of nature in the challenging city environment
- My Secret Places (1972)

== Personal life ==
He met his wife Muriel Schwartz at a radio industry party.

Often featured in his books and columns is his daughter Pauline Yearwood, herself a journalist and the managing editor for the Chicago Jewish News.
