= Mike Royko =

American newspaper columnist (1932–1997)

- Royko, c. early 1970s
- Born: Michael Royko Jr. September 19, 1932; Chicago, Illinois, U.S.
- Died: April 29, 1997 (aged 64); Chicago, Illinois, U.S.
- Resting place: Acacia Park Cemetery (Chicago)
- Occupations: Journalist; columnist
- Spouses: Carol Duckman (m. 1954; died 1979) Judy Arndt (m. 1986)
- Children: 4
- Writing career
- Language: English
- Period: 1955–1997

Michael Royko Jr. (September 19, 1932 – April 29, 1997) was an American newspaper columnist from Chicago, Illinois. Over his 42-year career, he wrote more than 7,500 daily columns for the Chicago Daily News, the Chicago Sun-Times, and the Chicago Tribune. A humorist whose writing spanned a broad range of topics, he was the winner of the 1972 Pulitzer Prize for commentary.

== Early life and education ==
Royko was born and grew up in Chicago, where he lived in an apartment above a bar. His mother, Helen (née Zak), was Polish, and his father, Michael Royko, was Ukrainian (born in Dolyna). He briefly attended Wright Junior College and then enlisted in the U.S. Air Force in 1952.

== Career ==
=== Journalism ===
On becoming a columnist, Royko drew on experiences from his childhood. He began his newsman's career as a columnist in 1955 for The O'Hare News, a U.S. Air Force newspaper, the City News Bureau of Chicago and Lerner Newspapers' Lincoln-Belmont Booster before working at the Chicago Daily News as a reporter, becoming an irritant to the city's politicians with penetrating and skeptical questions and reports.

Royko covered Cook County politics and government in a weekly political column, soon supplemented with a second, weekly column reporting about Chicago's folk music scene.

The success of those columns earned him a daily column in 1964, writing about all topics for the Daily News, an afternoon newspaper. His column appeared five days a week until 1992, when he cut back to four days a week. Studs Terkel explained Royko's incredible productivity and longevity by simply saying, "He is possessed by a demon." In 1972, Royko received the Pulitzer Prize for commentary as a Daily News columnist.

=== Chicago Sun-Times ===
When the Daily News closed, Royko worked for its allied morning newspaper, the Chicago Sun-Times. In 1984, Rupert Murdoch, for whom Royko said he would never work, bought the Sun-Times. Royko commented "No self-respecting fish would want to be wrapped in a Murdoch paper," and that "his goal is not quality journalism. His goal is vast power for Rupert Murdoch, political power." Mike Royko then worked for the rival Chicago Tribune, a paper he had said he'd never work for and at which he never felt comfortable. For a period after the takeover, the Sun-Times reprinted Royko's columns, while new columns appeared in the Tribune.

Many of Royko's columns are collected in books. He also authored Boss, his unauthorized biography of Richard J. Daley, the 48th mayor of Chicago, and the father of Richard, William, and John P. Daley.

External videos
- Mike Royko talks with Studs Terkel on WFMT; 1969/02/26, Studs Terkel Radio Archive

In 1976, a Royko column criticized the Chicago Police Department for providing an around-the-clock security detail for Frank Sinatra. Sinatra responded with a letter calling Royko a "pimp," and threatening to "punch [Royko] in the mouth" for speculating that he wore a toupée. Royko auctioned the letter, the proceeds going to the Salvation Army. The winner of the auction was Vie Carlson, mother of Cheap Trick drummer Bun E. Carlos. After appearing on Antiques Roadshow, Carlson consigned the letter to Freeman's, which auctioned it in 2010.

Like some other columnists, Royko created fictitious personae with whom he could "converse," the most famous being Slats Grobnik, a comically stereotyped working class Polish-Chicagoan. Generally, the Slats Grobnik columns described two men discussing a current event in a Polish neighborhood bar. In 1973, Royko collected several of the Grobnik columns in a collection titled Slats Grobnik and Some Other Friends. Another of Royko's characters was his pseudo-psychiatrist Dr. I. M. Kookie (eponymous protagonist of Dr. Kookie, You're Right! [1989]). Dr. Kookie, purportedly the founder of the Asylumism religion – according to which Earth was settled by a higher civilization's rejected insane people – satirized pop culture and pop psychology. Through his columns, Royko helped make his favorite after-work bar, the Billy Goat Tavern, famous, and popularized the curse of the Billy Goat. Billy Goat's reciprocated by sponsoring the Daily News's 16-inch softball team and featuring Royko's columns on their walls.

Royko's columns were syndicated country-wide in more than 600 newspapers. He produced more than 7,500 columns in a four-decade career. He also wrote or compiled dozens of "That's Outrageous!" columns for Reader's Digest.

By the 1990s he turned to national themes, often taking a conservative perspective on issues, including gay rights.

== Personal life ==
=== Marriages ===
Royko married Carol Duckman in 1954, and they had two sons, David and Robert. She suffered a cerebral hemorrhage and died on September 19, 1979, Royko's 47th birthday. He later described that time as "a period of disintegration." The only column he wrote during that period was a short note to readers on October 5, 1979, in which Royko wrote, "We met when she was 6 and I was 9. Same neighborhood street. Same grammar school. So if you ever have a 9-year-old son who says he is in love, don't laugh at him. It can happen." That column ended with a much-remembered line: "If there's someone you love but haven't said so in a while, say it now. Always, always, say it now."

In 1986, Royko married Judy Arndt, who had worked as the head of the Sun-Times public service office and was a tennis instructor. The couple lived on Chicago's Northwest Side and then on the city's North Side before moving to Winnetka, Illinois. He and Judy had two children.

=== Baseball and Chicago Cubs ===
Royko was a fervent devotee of 16-inch softball as a player and team sponsor. After his death, he was inducted into the Chicago 16-inch Softball Hall of Fame, an honor Royko's family insists he would have considered as meaningful as his Pulitzer. In the closing seconds of Royko at the Goat, the documentary by Scott Jacobs, Royko is heard saying, "The Pew (Pulitzer Prize) can't compare" to hitting a home run.

Royko was a life-long fan and critic of the Chicago Cubs. Every spring he would devote a column to a "Cubs Quiz," posing obscure trivia questions about mediocre Cubs players from his youth, such as Heinz Becker and Dom Dallessandro. Just prior to the 1990 World Series, he wrote about the findings of another fan, Ron Berler, who had discovered a spurious correlation called the "Ex-Cubs Factor." Berler and Royko predicted that the heavily favored Oakland Athletics, who had a "critical mass" of ex-Cubs players on their Series roster, would lose the championship to the Cincinnati Reds. The Reds achieved an upset outcome in a four-game sweep of the A's, with Royko's sponsorship propelling the Ex-Cubs Factor theory into the spotlight. Carl Erskine repeats Royko's claim of the Ex-Cubs Factor, and applies it to the 1951 Dodgers, in his book Carl Erskine's Tales from the Dodgers Dugout.

== Death ==
On April 22, 1997, Royko was admitted to Evanston Hospital after experiencing chest pains. He was later transferred to Northwestern Memorial Hospital in Chicago, and had surgery for an aneurysm; he died there from heart failure on April 29, at the age of 64. His body is entombed in Acacia Mausoleum, Acacia Park Cemetery, just outside Chicago.

== Honors and legacy ==
- Royko won the National Press Club Lifetime Achievement Award in 1990 and the Damon Runyon Award in 1995.
- John Belushi’s character in the 1981 film Continental Divide is modelled after Royko. (Belushi was a reader of Royko’s column and occasionally met the journalist at his father’s restaurant on North Avenue.)
- The "Royko Arrival" was an IFR arrival procedure used at O'Hare International Airport until 2013, when it was replaced by VEECK ONE.
- Mike Royko was inducted as a Laureate of The Lincoln Academy of Illinois and awarded the Order of Lincoln (the State's highest honor) by the Governor of Illinois in 1983 in the area of Communications.
- In 2011, Royko was inducted into the Chicago Literary Hall of Fame.
- The Newberry Library hosted an exhibition entitled "Chicago Style: Mike Royko and Windy City Journalism" (June 20 - September 28, 2024).
- Mitchell Bisschop created a one-man show in 2022 entitled “Royko: The Toughest Man in Chicago,” which had its Chicago premiere at the Chopin Theatre in September 2024.

== Books ==
- Royko, Mike (1967). Up Against It. H. Regnery.
- Royko, Mike (1968). I May Be Wrong, But I Doubt It. H. Regnery.
- Royko, Mike (1971). Boss: Richard J. Daley of Chicago (Plume reprint ed.). Penguin. ISBN 0-452-26167-8.
- Royko, Mike (1973). Slats Grobnik and Some Other Friends. Popular Library. ISBN 978-0-525-20495-4.
- Royko, Mike (1983). Sez Who? Sez Me (reprint ed.). Warner Books. ISBN 0-446-30896-X.
- Royko, Mike (1985). Like I Was Sayin (reprint ed.). Jove Books. ISBN 0-515-08416-6.
- Royko, Mike (1989). Dr. Kookie, You're Right (EP Dutton ed.). Dutton. ISBN 0-525-24813-7.
- Royko, Mike (2000). One More Time: The Best of Mike Royko. The University Of Chicago Press. ISBN 0-226-73072-7. With a foreword by Studs Terkel. Three columns excerpted from the book.
- Royko, Mike (2001). For the Love of Mike: More of the Best of Mike Royko. The University Of Chicago Press. ISBN 0-226-73073-5. With a foreword by Roger Ebert. Four columns excerpted from the book.
- Royko, Mike (2010). Early Royko: Up Against It in Chicago. The University Of Chicago Press. ISBN 978-0-226-73077-6. A reprint of Up Against It with a foreword by Rick Kogan
- Royko, Mike (2010). Royko in Love: Mike's Letters to Carol. The University Of Chicago Press. ISBN 978-0-226-73078-3. Edited by David Royko. A website for the book.

== See also ==
- List of newspaper columnists
- Mike Royko's papers are held by the Newberry Library in Chicago.
