= Lily Venson =

American journalist

Lily Pagratis Venson (October 24, 1924 – June 27, 2011) was an American journalist and was a resident of Chicago her entire life.

She attended Wilbur Wright College and Columbia College Chicago. She began writing for Lerner Newspapers at the Rogers Park office in 1962 and was an award-winning journalist and feature writer for the Lerner newspapers. She left the paper in 1973 to work as head of public relations for Cook County Hospitals. During her years at Lerner, she received numerous press awards including a nomination for the Pulitzer Prize by Columbia University and the City of New York, for a series of more than 100 articles she wrote on the crusade to preserve 100 acres of private golf land to create Lawrence C. Warren State Park in West Rogers Park in Chicago. For her coverage of this landmark event she was awarded a plaque of recognition in 1972 by Gov. of Illinois Richard Ogilvie.

Among her other stories of note, she covered the immigration battle in Chicago of Walter Polovchak. She also covered in person the last march of Martin Luther King Jr. from Selma to Montgomery, Alabama on March 21, 1965. She was a member of Illinois Women's Press Association.

The majority of her journalism articles and photos which covered many historical events in Chicago are housed at the Newberry Library in Chicago for archival deposit.

== Family ==
She was married to George Venson (1910–1998) and had two children, Virginia and Petros.
