= Will Sullivan =

Will Sullivan (also known as "Journerdism") is a leading tech and journalism blogger, award-winning multimedia journalist and an educator.

== Early life and education ==
Sullivan was born in Toledo, Ohio and attended the University of Toledo where he worked on The Independent Collegian student newspaper. He also attended Northwestern University for his master's degree in New Media at the Medill School of Journalism and The Poynter Institute for a Visual Journalism Fellowship.

In 2010, he was awarded a fellowship with the Reynolds Journalism Institute at the University of Missouri where he studied mobile and tablet news development. Also in 2010, he was elected the youngest ever member of the Online News Association board of directors.

== Career ==
Sullivan is currently a Project Lead for 18F. While at 18F Sullivan has served as Product Lead for the United States' Web Design Standards, Product Lead for the eRegulations team, Product Lead for the OGP Payroll Research team, and led mobile consulting engagements for HHS, Healthcare.gov, DHS (US Customs and Border Protection Office of Human Resources), TSA, among others. He has been regularly asked to speak at South by South Lawn, The White House (President Obama), the Open Government Working Group, GoodGovUX, and other gov tech events.

Sullivan has served as Dean of the Awesome Foundation's DC Chapter since 2015.

In 2014-15, Sullivan served as a MOOC Co-Director and Mobile Trainer for Knight Center for Journalism in the Americas.

Will Sullivan was the Director of Mobile for the Broadcasting Board of Governors ('13-'15), an independent federal agency that operates numerous digital and broadcast properties including The Voice of America, Middle East Broadcasting Networks, Radio Free Europe, Radio Free Asia, and others, delivering content in 59 languages to more than 187 million people weekly around the world. While at BBG, Sullivan received several distinguished citations 2015 GSMA Global Mobile Awards finalist for "Best Mobile Media & Publishing App", 2015 GSMA Global Mobile Awards finalist for "Best Mobile Music App", 2015 Society for News Design Best of Digital Design Award of Excellence winner for Alhurra redesign, 2015 Appy Award Finalist for "Best Radio/Audio App", 2014 GSMA Global Mobile Awards finalist for "Best Mobile Publishing Product or Service", 2014 Appy Award finalist for "Best Multicultural App", and the 2014 Meffy Award finalist for "Best Mobile Service".

Sullivan was the co-founder of the National Press Photographers Association's Multimedia Immersion Workshop. He served as Co-Director from 2006-2017.

Sullivan was selected by Editor and Publisher as one of 2012’s “25 under 35” innovative young journalism leaders.

Sullivan is a member of the Online News Association executive committee and serves as the secretary for the board of directors.

Sullivan has led the strategy, design and development execution for more than 170 mobile and tablet applications, more than three hundred mobile websites.

Sullivan has been asked to share his expertise and lead training for South by Southwest Interactive, the Online News Association, Society for News Design, National Press Photographer Association, The Poynter Institute, Knight Digital Media Center at USC and Berkeley, and more than two dozen universities around the world, including Syracuse and Northwestern University.

In 2012, Sullivan was the first person awarded two President's Awards from the Society for News Design for his contributions to the organization and industry. He co-founded and co-lead the National Press Photographers Association's Multimedia Immersion workshop over the past 5 years, which has trained hundreds of photojournalists multimedia storytelling skills, including Pulitzer Prize winners, and award-winning photographers from The Los Angeles Times' Carolyn Cole to Pete Souza, President Barack Obama's chief photographer and former Chicago Tribune staff photographer.

Sullivan was also a judge for the Society for News Design's 2011 "Best of News Design" competition and he was co-chair of the 2011 SND conference, which took place in St. Louis on Sept. 29 - Oct. 1, 2011.
