= Community journalism =

Type of news coverage

Community journalism is locally-oriented, professional news coverage that typically focuses on city neighborhoods, individual suburbs or small towns, rather than metropolitan, state, national or world news.

If it covers wider topics, community journalism concentrates on the effect they have on local readers. Community newspapers, often but not always publish weekly, and also tend to cover subjects larger news media do not. Some examples of topics are students on the honor roll at the local high school, school sports, crimes such as vandalism, zoning issues and other details of community life. However, such "hyperlocal" articles are sometimes dismissed as "chicken dinner" stories.

Leo Lerner, founder of Chicago's erstwhile Lerner Newspapers, used to say, "A fistfight on Clark Street is more important to our readers than a war in Europe."

An increasing number of community newspapers are now owned by large media organizations, although many rural papers are still "mom and pop" operations.

Most community journalists are professionally trained reporters and editors. Some specialized training programs in community journalism have recently emerged at established undergraduate and graduate journalism programs. Community journalism should not be confused with the work of citizen journalists, who are often unpaid amateurs, or with civic journalism, although many community newspapers practice that.

At the "Emerging Mind of Community Journalism" conference in Anniston, Ala., in 2006, participants created a list characterizing community journalism: community journalism is intimate, caring, and personal; it reflects the community and tells its stories; and it embraces a leadership role.

If you want more of a definition, I'm afraid it's like when someone asked Louie Armstrong for a definition of jazz. The great Satchmo is reputed to have replied something like this: 'Man, if you have to ask, it won't do me any good to try to explain.' You know community journalism when you see it; it is the heartbeat of American journalism, journalism in its natural state."

— Jock Lauterer

== Figures ==
In 1995, there were the following community papers:
- 124 Alternative
- 192 Black
- 160 Ethnic
- 43 Gay and Lesbian
- 132 Hispanic
- 106 Jewish
- 134 Military
- 155 Parenting
- 128 Religious
- 132 Senior

In the United States, about 97% of newspapers are classified as "community" newspapers, with circulations below 50,000. Others in the field say the circulation limit should be 30,000. However, in her book Saving Community Journalism, Penny Abernathy argues that most newspapers under 100,000 should consider themselves community newspapers because their reason for being is service to a community or a group of communities.

== History ==
Community journalism got its name from a Montana editor, Ken Byerly, early in his tenure as a professor of journalism at UNC-Chapel Hill in 1957-71. Although the term is relatively new, community journalism has been around since the founding fathers. He used the term as a new name for a course that had been titled "Editing the Country Weekly" because it didn't fit the suburban newspapers that had developed in the 1950s. He chose community journalism because it fit both the weeklies and small dailies of the day.

== The journalism debate ==
Not everyone agrees on the principles or practices of community journalism. Traditionally, journalists advocate avoiding any real or perceived conflict of interests, which can be anything from refraining from joining community groups, to not pledging money to a candidate they support. Community journalism, however, encourages the coverage of news that hits close to home, even for the journalist covering the story.

Some philosophers encourage professional journalists to remain independent, whereas others insist on committing to local and generalized communities as a prerequisite for true citizenship. Some say community involvement is fine for editors and publishers, but not for the reporters who have the ability to "shape" the news. Critics say this involvement is a risk for anyone involved in producing the news.

Clifford Christians, co-author of Good News Social Ethics and the Press, urges journalists to realize that their publics may gravitate toward self-interest, and therefore the journalists should report stories that lessen the isolationism that comes from reading wider, world-based stories. A fundamental flaw in community journalism is the stubborn resistance to change and a compulsion to shape the system to maintain community standards.

Loyalty to a community is the inevitable price of acceptance, and the fee is creating sharp conflicts with allegiance to the truth. Through community journalism, attitudes about necessary information change from the need for a broad range of information (pluralism) to a reliance on information necessary to maintain community values and fortify the status quo (reinforcement).

Sooner or later group importance could transcend the value of distributing accurate information both internally to members of the group, and externally about the community or group.

Others think the switch toward community journalism is a natural reaction to our out-of-touch mega media. J. Herbert Altschull, writer of "A Crisis of Conscience: Is Community Journalism the Answer?" sees community journalism as a natural outgrowth from concerns of the media's slippage in credibility and influence.

== Organizations ==
The International Society of Weekly Newspaper Editors, which has 260 members in seven countries (U.S., Canada, U.K., Ireland, Japan, Australia, New Zealand), encourages and promotes independent editorial comment, news content, and leadership in community newspapers throughout the world. Its purpose is to help those involved in the community press improve standards of editorial writing and news reporting and to encourage strong, independent editorial voices.

== Examples ==
=== Portland, ME ===
A publication devoted solely to state education reform was created by Maine Sunday Telegram/Portland Press Herald editor, Lou Ureneck and Maine Council of Churches, Sarah Campbell. Their primary objective was to create study circles to dispense information to the public on the different perspectives on education:

- To prepare one for a job
- To teach lifelong learning
- To develop good citizens
- To teach the basics

This newspaper, as with many community journalism publications, has sole control over editorial content. The content itself is very important and relevant to Maine communities and revolves around "core value" choices, as determined by the community. The community journalist reporters were required to give readers a background on each perspective and to "write an expository rather than conventional he-said/she-said style."

The publication ran more than 100 inches of factual reporting on education in Maine, as well as op-ed pieces promoting one of the four perspectives, and summary reports on the opposing viewpoint. The newspaper was received well, and, as a result, roughly 700 community members took part in the reader roundtables.

=== Virginia ===
The Virginian-Pilot is a second example of a community newspaper. This publication sought to "show how the community works or could work" and to "portray democracy in the fullest sense of the word, whether in a council chamber or a cul-de-sac."

Known as the Public Life Team, they meet with panels of citizens regularly to "tap their thoughts and dreams for the regions' future." Additionally, they have changed the perception of criminal sentencing from a polarized issue to one that rehabilitation advocates were in favor of. Finally, they opened a line of communication between various community members for the Hall Place neighborhood. "The Pilot got black and white residents to talk freely about the plan." Without the assistance of the Pilot, the community would not have come to the conclusion that it "ought to be what was good for the city as a whole."

This publication in particular has paved way for other community journalists, mainly due to its experimental nature and eagerness to give reporters the opportunity to brainstorm ideas together. Overall, the Pilot wants to improve the tone of public discourse in the Virginian community.

=== London, United Kingdom ===
Fitzrovia News is an example from a central London neighbourhood. Residents and volunteers produce a quarterly printed newspaper delivered free to all residential addresses and local businesses in the district of Fitzrovia. The paper which also has a website and social media network covers issues of concern to residents and small businesses. Originally called The Tower it is perhaps the United Kingdom's oldest community newspaper.

== Community blogging ==
There is a growing number of community blogs coming to the surface. These local bloggers and community members (many who have no journalism background) join together to write about and advocate for their community in an online forum. These blogs serve as watchdogs to hold the public and other media outlets accountable for their actions. According to a Zogby International survey, 70% of Americans say journalism is important to maintaining community quality of life, and 67% say the traditional media are out of touch with what citizens want from their news. One more Journalist community was developed by Team Media services (TMS), Hyderabad (India) based Telug News Agency by name "Crime Reporter's Community"

Community blogs also provide a service to organizations that encourage civic engagement. It give them a birds-eye-view of the happenings of the communities they affect without interjecting themselves into any one community.

== Emergence of mobile news ==
According to the "State of the News Media: An Annual Report on American Journalism", nearly half of all American adults (47%) report that they get at least some local news and information on their cell phone or tablet computer. They are interested in obtaining news that is practical and in real time and fall under the demographic of higher socioeconomic status, younger, newer residents, reside in non-rural areas, and parent minor children.

Mobile news is important because participants "feel they can have an impact on their communities, more likely to use a variety of media platforms, feel more plugged into the media environment than they did a few years ago, and are more likely to use social media."

Citizens can not only read news from their local community, with tablets and smart phones, they can also share and post links to stories, comment, or contribute themselves.

=== Survey ===
The Pew Research Center's Project for Excellence in Journalism and Internet & American Life Project partnered with the Knight Foundation to conduct a national survey from January 12–25, 2011. They polled 2,251 adults over the age of 18 in both English and Spanish to "explore the role that cell phones and tablet computers play in people's patterns of consuming and contributing to community information.

=== Results ===
84% of adult Americans own a cell phone and 47% of that population access local news and information on mobile devices, as it serves an immediate need.

However, those polled stated that topics like crime, community events, schools and education, and politics and cultural events are a fraction of topics sought after. In other words, citizens have not reached the point where they use mobile devices as a primary source to acquire community journalism-related subjects.

== Purpose ==
Community newspapers throw most of their weight behind supplying local coverage and making national and international news stories relate by finding a significant local angle. They embrace their civil role by promoting the general welfare of the community. The finest community newspapers recognize and accept this covenant with their towns: that they are key stakeholders and players in the forces that help build and celebrate their communities. Community journalism is a serious effort to return to the reputation journalism once had, and to restore the role of the press to its original purpose—that is, to serve as a breeding place for ideas and opinions.

At their best, community newspapers affirm a sense of community through their publications. It emphasizes connectedness and "us-ness." It's covering school plays across four columns with pictures of the students large enough to see their faces. It's showing the community members that they, as individuals, matter.

== Measurement ==
Through a qualitative and quantitative content analysis of scholarship on community and news media, community news media should (a) facilitate the process of negotiating and making meaning about community and (b) reveal or ensure understanding of community structure.

Community journalism would ideally reveal, or make individuals aware of, spaces, institutions, resources, events, and ideas that may be shared, and encourage such sharing. The practice should also facilitate the process of negotiating and making meaning about a community.

It is suggested that news media outlets do not choose to either practice community journalism exclusively or disregard it. Rather, media outlets generally engage in some degree of community journalism, as measured by the types of practices they follow and the intensity with which they follow them. A summated scale of multiple ordinal-level items would be an appropriate measure of community journalism. This is because community journalism is on a scale on which data is shown simply in order of magnitude since there is no standard of measurement of differences.

In addition, numerous studies in this analysis suggest that any scale measure of community journalism should accommodate the impact of the community's power structure on news decisions and should address the need for inclusion of less powerful voices.

== Criteria ==
One way to measure the degree to which news outlets reveal community structure is the following list: Media outlet content provides

- Communities with contact information for community leaders, officials, experts, and community organizations.
- Information from community leaders, officials, experts, and community organizations that is usable and relevant to community members.
- Information on community services and institutions.
- Information so that communities understand how to use services and institutions.
- Information on clubs and organizations.
- Information that helps communities understand how to get involved with local or relevant clubs and organizations.
- Information that helps communities take advantage of local or relevant events and festivities.

== See also ==
- Creative nonfiction
- History of journalism
- History of American newspapers
- Journalism
- Journalism ethics and standards
- Journalism education and Journalism school
- Journalism genres
- Non-profit journalism
- Objectivity (journalism)
- Yellow journalism
