= Read/Write Library =

Coordinates: 41.898012°N 87.696948°W

- Location: 914 N. California, Chicago, IL, United States
- Type: volunteer
- Established: 2006

Other information
- Website: readwritelibrary.org

The Read/Write Library is "a repository of pamphlets, zines, community plans, oral histories, neighborhood newspapers, literary magazines from CPS schools and state prisons, parish-church and settlement-house cookbooks, self-published poetry and novels, and other ephemera that, taken together, tells the story of Chicago by Chicagoans in their own words, not filtered through the perspectives of academics or journalists."

Nell Taylor founded the library in 2006 as the Chicago Underground Library. It initially operated out of MoJoe's, a coffee shop in Roscoe Village that was a hub for zine-related activity in Chicago.

It moved to Humboldt Park in 2011.
