= John Stuart Ingle =

American contemporary realist artist (1933–2010)

- Born: 1933; Evansville, Indiana
- Died: October 30, 2010 (aged 76–77); Minnetonka, Minnesota
- Other name: John S. Ingle
- Known for: Painting, water color

John Stuart Ingle (1933 – October 30, 2010) was an American contemporary realist artist, known for his meticulously rendered watercolor paintings, typically still lifes. Some criticism has characterized Ingle's work as a kind of magic realism. Ingle was born in Indiana and died, aged 77, in Minnesota.

Significant critical recognition of Ingle's work has included the publication of a book, The Eye and the Heart: Watercolors of John Stuart Ingle (Rizzoli International, 1988), authored by Pulitzer Prize–winning journalist John Camp, and including an introduction by Frank H. Goodyear Jr., president of the Pennsylvania Academy of the Fine Arts (and author of Contemporary Realism since 1960). The 110-page book on Ingle was published in conjunction with major solo exhibitions jointly sponsored by the Wadsworth Atheneum in Hartford, Connecticut, and the Evansville Museum of Arts, History and Science in Evansville, Indiana.

== Style: intense, "virtuoso" realism ==
A 1991 review by Vivien Raynor, a reviewer for The New York Times, remarked that "John Stuart Ingle proves that Magic Realism lives in his virtuoso still life incorporating silver, peaches and a plant in a blue ceramic pot, all on a wood table".

The realism of Ingle's paintings can verge on the shocking, especially when, as is sometimes the case, a painting is radically larger than scale. In 2005, another reviewer for The New York Times reviewer wrote of "a giant, startlingly realistic watercolor by John Stuart Ingle showing tomatoes preserved in a Mason jar."

If Raynor is correct in characterizing Ingle as a kind of second- or third-generation magic realist, then this is a magic realism closer to the ideals espoused by Franz Roh in 1925 than to the style of what have commonly been called "magic realist" painters in the early 21st century. These latter-day magic realists have generally pursued a style closer to magic realism in literature, in which the realistic veers into the impossible or fantastic. In contrast, Roh advocated a faithful rendering of the exterior of what is actually observed, the idea being that when one really sees the world with full intensity, the inherent magic of things becomes evident, with no need to add fantastic, impossible, or supernatural elements to a picture. Ingle's own description of his approach to painting is philosophically in tune with Roh's ideal. Of his penetratingly precise realistic style, Ingle has written: "I don't want to make arbitrary changes in what I see to paint the picture, I want to paint what is given. The whole idea is to take something that's given and explore that reality as intensely as I can."

Askart.com further categorizes Ingle's style as not just realist, but photo-realist. This designation would not, however, appear to be appropriate, given that in the introduction to the aforementioned monograph on the artist, Frank Goodyear (page 14) writes, "While not a photorealist, although he [Ingle] does use the airbrush techniques of some photorealists, his finished watercolors do evince the incredible technical virtuosity of photorealism."

== Collections ==
According to Askart.com, Ingle's work is in several notable public collections, including those of the Metropolitan Museum of Art, the Yale University Art Gallery, the Evansville Museum of Arts, History and Science, and the Arkansas Arts Center (AAC). Below is an external link to a page providing information, with color images, on two works by Ingle in the AAC's collection. The Art Institute of Chicago also includes one of Ingle's watercolors in its collection, according to the Institute's online catalogue.

== See also ==
- Realism
- Magic realism
- Photo-realism
