= Irma Hünerfauth =

German painter and sculptor (1907–1998)

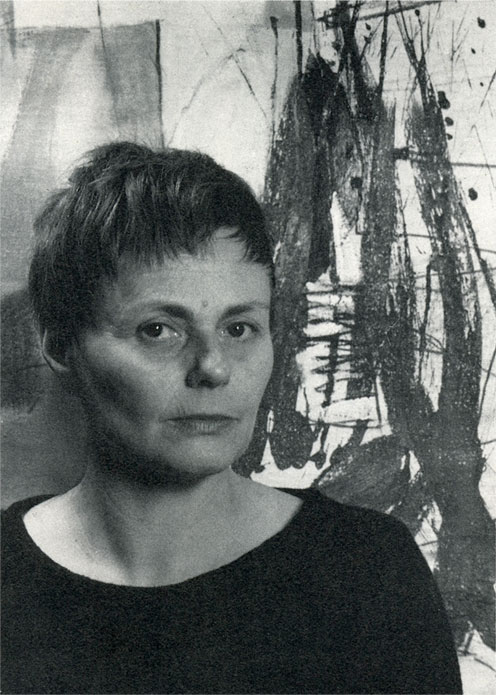
- Irma Hünerfauth, 1960
- Born: 31 December 1907; Donaueschingen, Germany
- Died: 11 December 1998 (aged 90); Kreuth, Germany
- Education: Arts School for Design, Munich; Academy of Fine Arts, Munich
- Known for: Painting, sculpture and kinetic art
- Website: http://www.irma-huenerfauth.com

Irma Hünerfauth, also known as IRMAnipulations (31 December 1907 – 11 December 1998) was a German painter, sculptor and object artist who turned junkyard scrap into sculptures, machines and kinetic art objects that mocked consumer society. She opposed traditional academic art, rebelled against academism and followed radical contemporary art trends in post-war Germany. Through her work she is related to the concept of artists from the post-war modernity (Abstract expressionism, Fluxus, Informalism, Tachisme) as well as the Nouveau Réalisme group of artists, such as Niki de Saint-Phalle, Jean Tinguely, Arman as well as Daniel Spoerri.

== Life ==
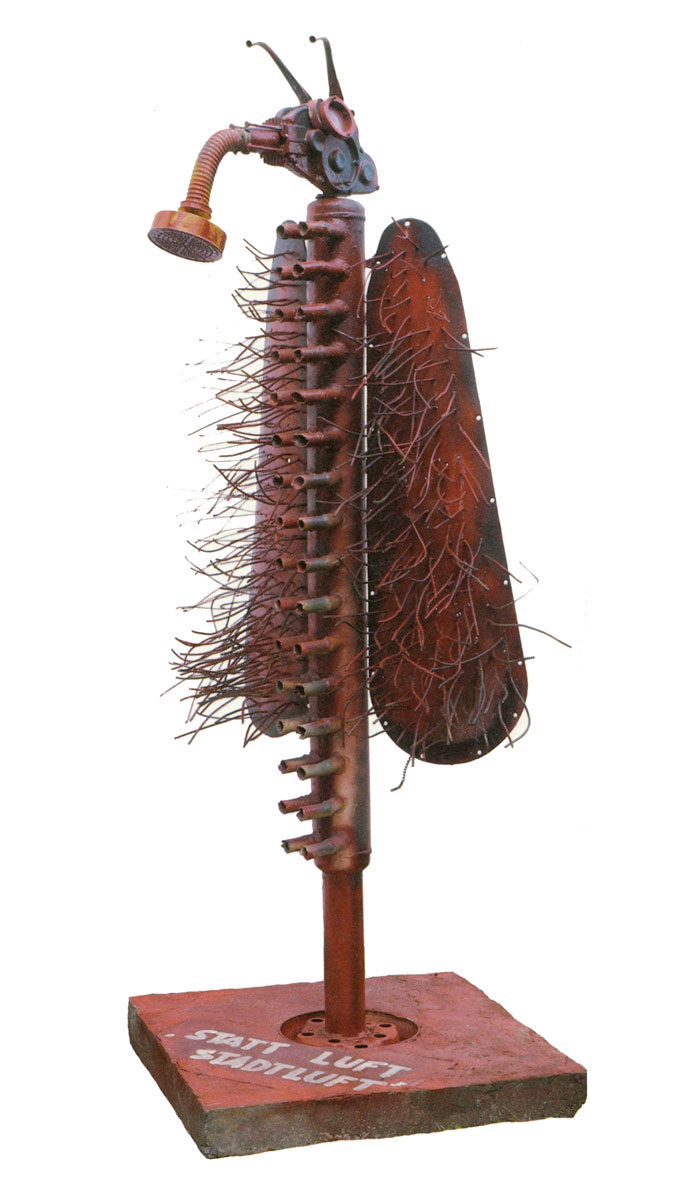
Instead of air – big city atmosphere "smog", 1971. Scrap sculpture "Occam-Human"

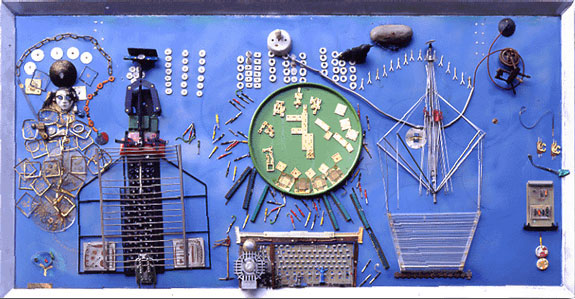
The bilious green plate before blue, c. 1995. Metal collage (Assemblage)

Hünerfauth was born on 31 December 1907 in Donaueschingen, the daughter of a brewery manager. After a fire in 1914, her family moved to Munich. In 1917 Hünerfauth attended a class on drawing for adults. During her school time in 1923 she underwent practical training in shop window design in a fashion shop and continued this training from 1925 until 1928. From 1925 until 1928, she attended the Female Labor School in Munich and from 1929 until 1932 she attended the Arts School for Design in Munich as a student under Helmuth Ehmcke. In 1933 Hünerfauth married the lawyer Wilhelm Schäfer, with whom she had a son. From 1935 until 1937 she studied painting at the Academy of Fine Arts, Munich under Professor Jank and Professor Hess.

In 1938 Hünerfauth divorced Schäfer and moved to the Dachauer Moos near Munich. In 1939 she married her second husband, Jost Höpker, but they divorced soon afterwards.

In 1940, Hünerfauth returned to live with her parents in Grosshesselohe near Munich. In 1942, she was evacuated to Chiemsee and later to the area of Landshut. In 1945, the family returned to Grosshesselohe, where Hünerfauth built an atelier. On 20 November 1948, she married her third husband, Franz Führer, also known by his artist's name "Führer-Wolkenstein". They remained married for 28 years. Franz Führer worked as a construction manager for the public utilities of Munich. As an artist, Führer-Wolkenstein worked closely with Hünerfauth and assisted her with detailed electrotechnical work for her multimedia art projects. After his retirement he created kinetic art objects, so-called recycling machines.

In 1954 Hünerfauth received private training from Conrad Westpfahl, an important artist of Informal Art, which led her to abstract painting. In 1958 she attended courses on etching and lithography. In 1959, she was awarded the Prix d'Unions des Femmes Peintres in Paris for her painting titled Düsternis (Gloom). Two female artists (Lentz and Strauss) expressed their disapproval and one of them cut her painting with a knife. Hünerfauth had it restored. The art critic Franz Roh and his wife Juliane Roh were early supporters and patrons of Hünerfauth's work. They encouraged her and featured her work very positively in their publications. When Franz Roh died, Hünerfauth printed a series of ten lithographs In Memory of Franz Roh, 1966. In 1962, she attended a course on welding and subsequently began to sculpt in scrap metal. In 1964 she received the advancement award from the Herbstsalon München (Autumn exhibition Art Salon Munich).

In 1965, Hünerfauth founded the "Gruppe K" (Group K) in Munich, together with the artists Walter Raum (1923–2009), Dieter Stöver (1924–1988) and Hans Joachim Strauch. In 1966 she was awarded the Medaille de Bronze de la Ville de Paris.

In 1968/69 Hünerfauth turned away from painting. She created her first projects for exhibitions with the artists of Gruppe K (Group K) to be seen at the Haus der Kunst (House of Arts) Munich, called the optical-acoustic collage for piano and speakers; and together with her husband she created vibrational objects from 1971 onwards. In 1972, she created her first 'sprechende Kästen' (speaking boxes) on the themes of loneliness, first love and war. All of these objects required detailed technical attention. Führer-Wolkenstein, who also invented an earthing contact tester, was her partner for those technical art projects. He was cautious, thoughtful and intense while she was spontaneous with an intensive willingness and a strong impulse for her decisions, so they complemented each other's temper. On 25 November 1976 Führer-Wolkenstein died. Hünerfauth built a funerary monument for him out of scrap metal at the cemetery of Pullach in Munich. Then, Hünerfauth started to specialize in so called "Artist's Prayer Books" in the 1980s and 1990s, which she created from micro-electronic scrap. The use of these materials as well as the construction of the so-called "speaking boxes" were unique and distinguished her from other object artists of that time.

In 1990 Hünerfauth was awarded the Schwabinger Kunstpreis in Munich. On 12 November 1998 she died in Kreuth (Tegernsee).

== Career ==
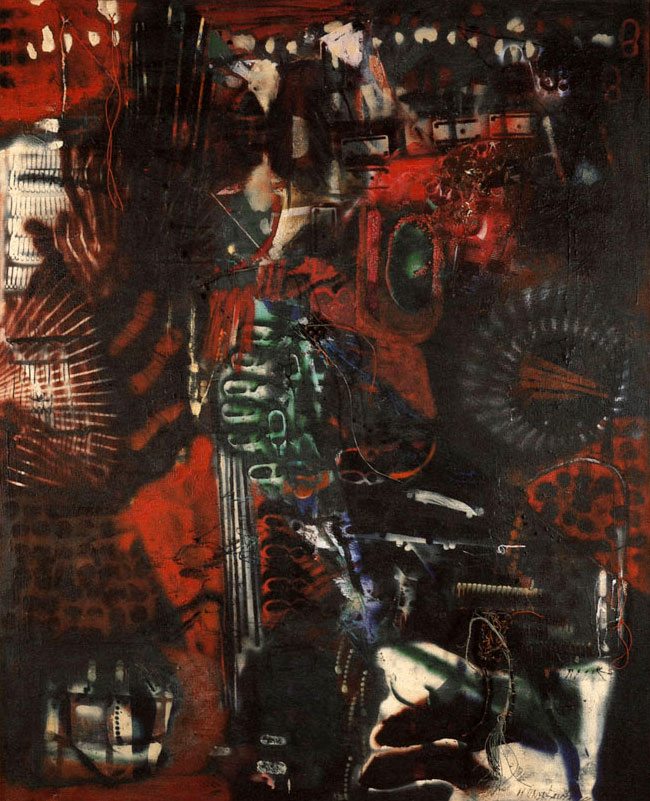
The red infamy, 1966. Painting with metal collage

Hünerfauth began her career as a figurative painter. Her early work features bold and unexpected perspectives and an unusual coloration. Franz Roh said that her concentration was on neither a picturesque tachism nor a graphically linear constructivism, but that she should be understood between those. Her style of painting was a "highly individual crossing of tranquillity and mobility in the picture". She experimented with unusual tools, such as the use of a dentist's drill for a series of drypoint prints.

Her teacher Conrad Westpfahl, a renowned artist of Informal Art, led her to develop into an abstract painter. She advanced her mixed media technique with collages and applications from different materials. Next she started to tinker and construct and since then worked three-dimensionally only. The following realized objects (scrap sculptures, metal collages (assemblage), etc.) connected her work with the Nouveaux Realistes group.

Hünerfauth always titled her work with the term IRMAnipulations, a word creation which was invented during an exhibition at the Goethe Institut in London in 1983 and kept by the artist as a kind of trademark. One of the most important retrospective exhibitions of her oeuvre titled "Irma Hünerfauth – IRMAnipulations" was held from 3 August until 2 September 1990 in the town hall of Munich.

=== Painting ===
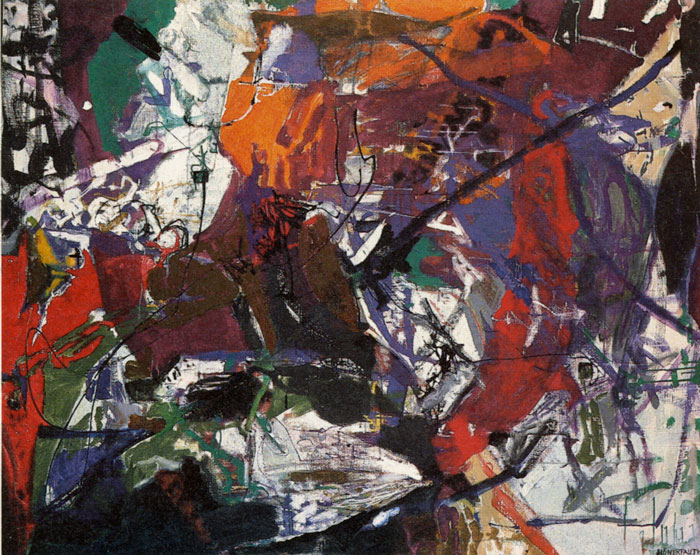
Untitled, 1964. Painting

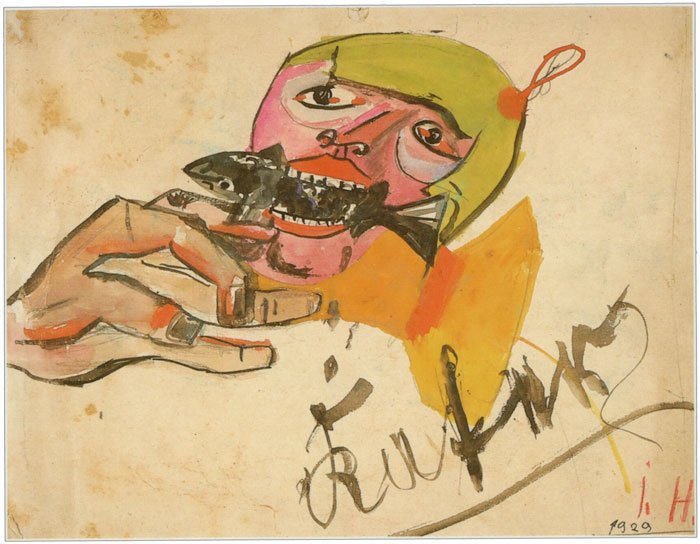
Cat, 1929. Watercolour

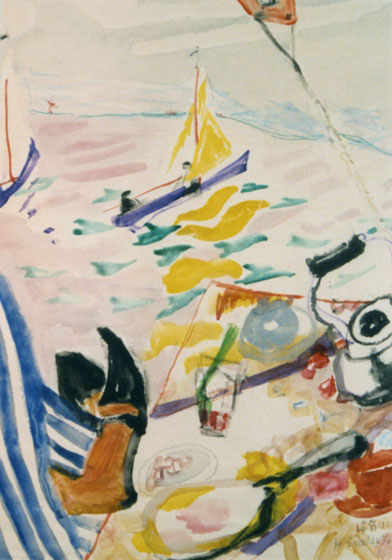
At the beach, 1957. Watercolour

Hünerfauth's artistic career began as a painter. At first she was taught in the craft of painting during a solid traditional academic training under the professors Jank and Hess at the Akademie der Bildenden Künste (Academy of Fine Arts) in Munich. Thus at first, Hünerfauth painted figurative landscapes (e.g., Isartalbahnhof, 1938) and portraits, mostly from her familial environment (e.g., Familie Hünerfauth, 1946) and if she had followed that norm, she would have become a respectable painter of the post-impressionism style. But indeed, even the paintings of her early period featured their own signature style. Occasionally, expressionistic elements can be found, for example the wildly moved landscape forms in the painting "Pupplinger Au" (1950) or "Mother and Son" (1952), which show strong emotional movement and deepness. The first mentioned owes much to Edvard Munch "The Scream" (1892).

From 1954, under the influence of Conrad Westpfahl, she began painting abstractly. One of her last paintings, Winter in Gries (1958), forgoes perspective entirely and conventionalizes the buildings to abstract areas. Now, she wanted to remove all the decorative art elements completely. Her paintings of the following years can be described as consequent as well as radical. She "attempts to bring the inventive impulse to an inner equilibrium by supporting it with a meditative character. Together the severity of the order and the softness of the whole gain the dramatic power of a dialogue. The dialogue lends movement and a facetting to the surface which seems haunted by a kind of dream". On the other hand, strong emotions are expressed abstractly, with a chaotic mixup of brushstrokes, an excessive frenzy of colors, vigorous and in a rough-textured style, as in her mixed media composition Untitled (1963). Occasionally her mostly large-sized paintings owe much to abstract Expressionism and the pioneers of Action painting, such as Jackson Pollock, Joan Mitchell, Grace Hartigan, and Helen Frankenthaler. Her work is sometimes playful, as in the painting "16.1.1963" (1963), and sometimes experimental as in the painting The red Infamy (1966), in which she fixated metal wires through the canvas similar to a collage. Her abstract painting unites emotional expressiveness with graphic rigor.

In 1969, she painted the "letzte Bild" (last picture – 1969/1989). It features a painted perforated metal plate on which emotional impulses run riot as if they were driven by electronic force. In the right corner, one can spot a drain plug with a chain simply fixated on canvas, a find, a piece of scrap that profanely ironizes the whole utopian and playfully futuristic portrayal, just like the subject that seems to be placed somewhere between space and earth. She expresses herself on the canvas playfully, headstrong, sometimes curious but also visionary. However, it seems that even the surface of a large canvas has become too small, as a suitable playing field of her present intentions. She had already built her first sculptural objects and she seemed to concentrate on one form of expression, eventually it should be working in the three-dimensional form. After "letzte Bild" she unexpectedly stopped painting and left only a relatively small oeuvre of pictures (Wilhelm Schäfer counts only 45 paintings which remained in the artist's estate, excluding watercolors and drawings). The turning away from painting marked the end of the sixties and was symptomatically for lots of other contemporary artists, too. Hünerfauth wanted to experiment, just as artists like her did it at that time.

She partly returned to figurative painting, for example in sketches of her three-dimensional work and also later as she painted the picture "Mutter auf dem Weg zur Urmutter" (Mother becomes primordial mother, 1981).

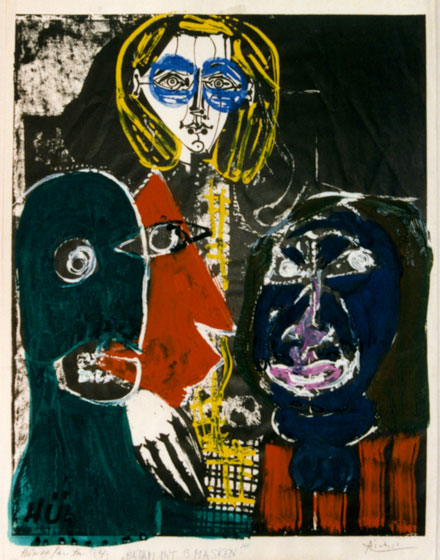
Madam and 3 masks, 1973. Mixed media

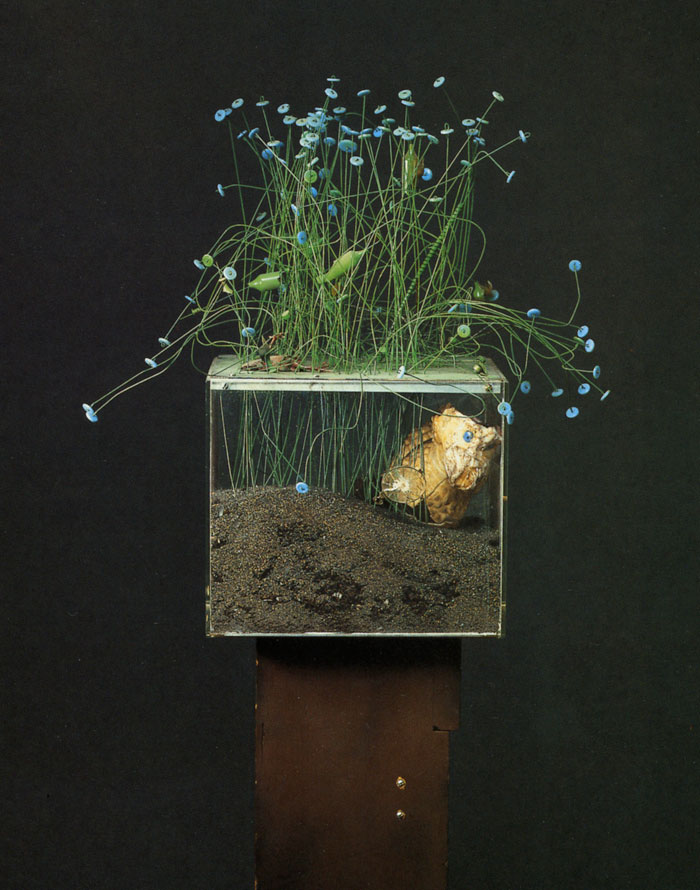
War animals suffer, too. Speaking box, 1986

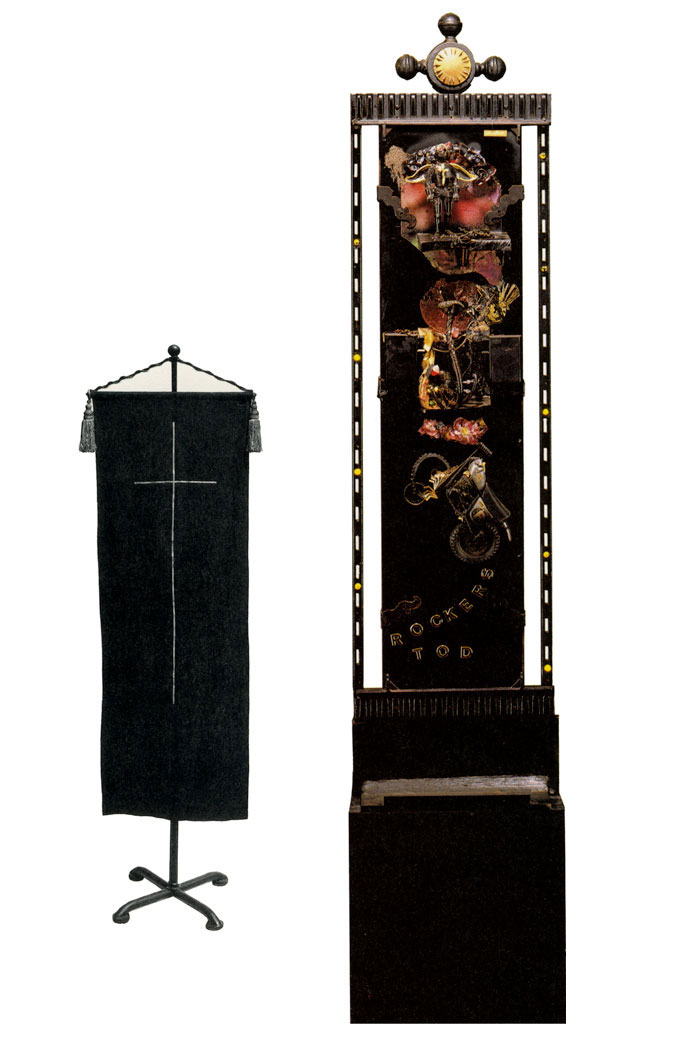
The death of the biker, 1989. Speaking object/ Installation

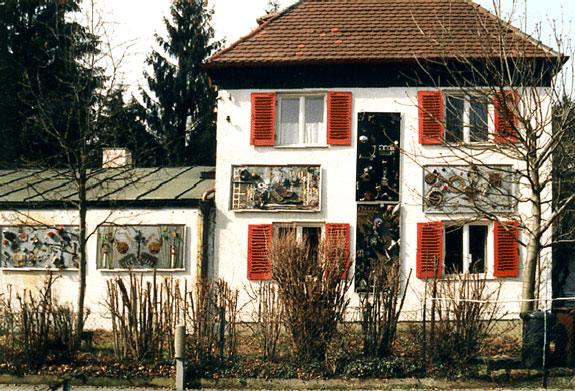
Metal collages (Assemblage) on the exterior facade of the artist's house

=== Prints ===
The development of her printed graphic work evolved parallel to her painting and eventually became experimental. During her early period, Hünerfauth made figurative drawings and watercolors in the style of the academic tradition, but even her sketch-like work already featured an expressive verve. Then she worked with a dentist's drill on the plates for a series of drypoints. She made linoleum cuts, lithographs and etchings. Most of these prints she printed in very small editions. She made embossed prints, also named scrap embossing, in editions of one only; these were appliqued with pieces of metal or cloth. Her Picasso-variations, inspired by the campaign 'Picassoanmalen (overpainting Picasso)' from the Engelhorn foundation Munich, were an ironical statement to the gallery owner Peter Luft who often expressed that her intentions resembled Picasso's. These are Pablo Picasso reproduction posters which she simply overpainted. Also notable is the already mentioned folder in memory of Franz Roh, a tribute which emphasizes friendship, closeness, and death.

== Works ==
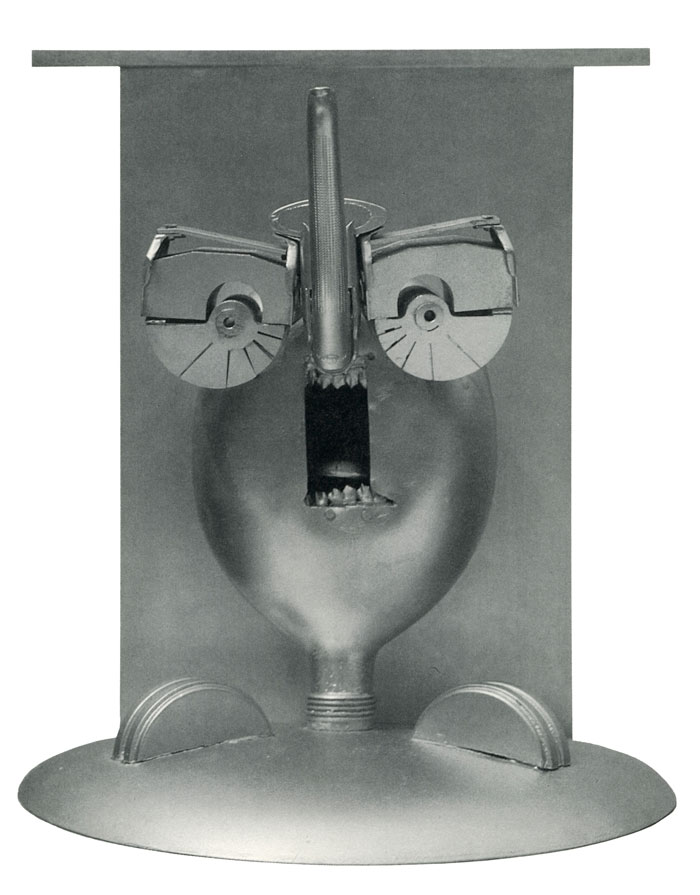
Admonisher "Ma(h)nuel", 1977/1989. Scrap object

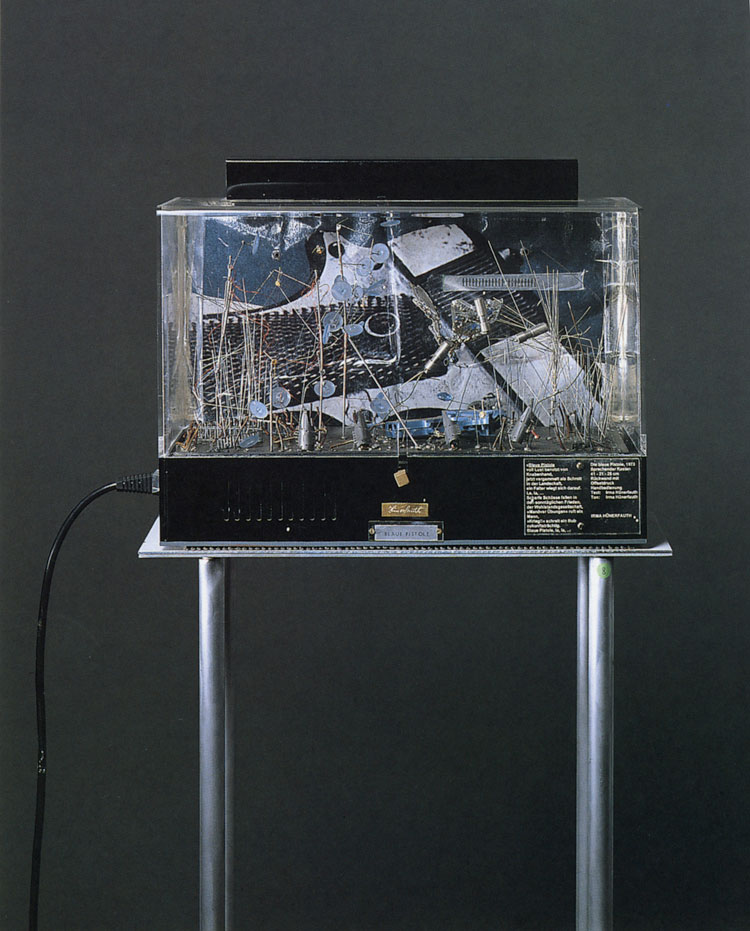
Blue pistol, 1973. Speaking box

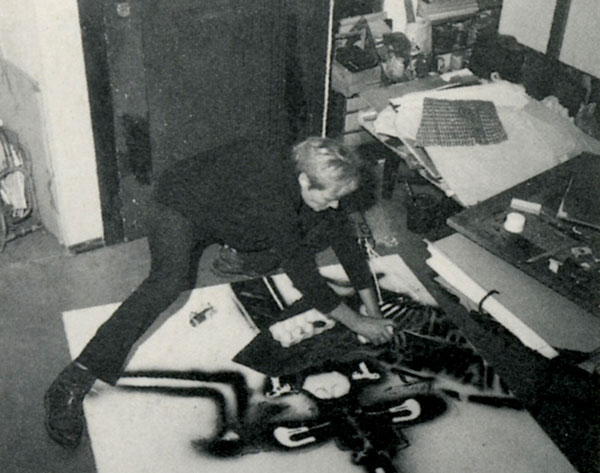
The artist at work on the painting "The mongol crosses the street", 1974

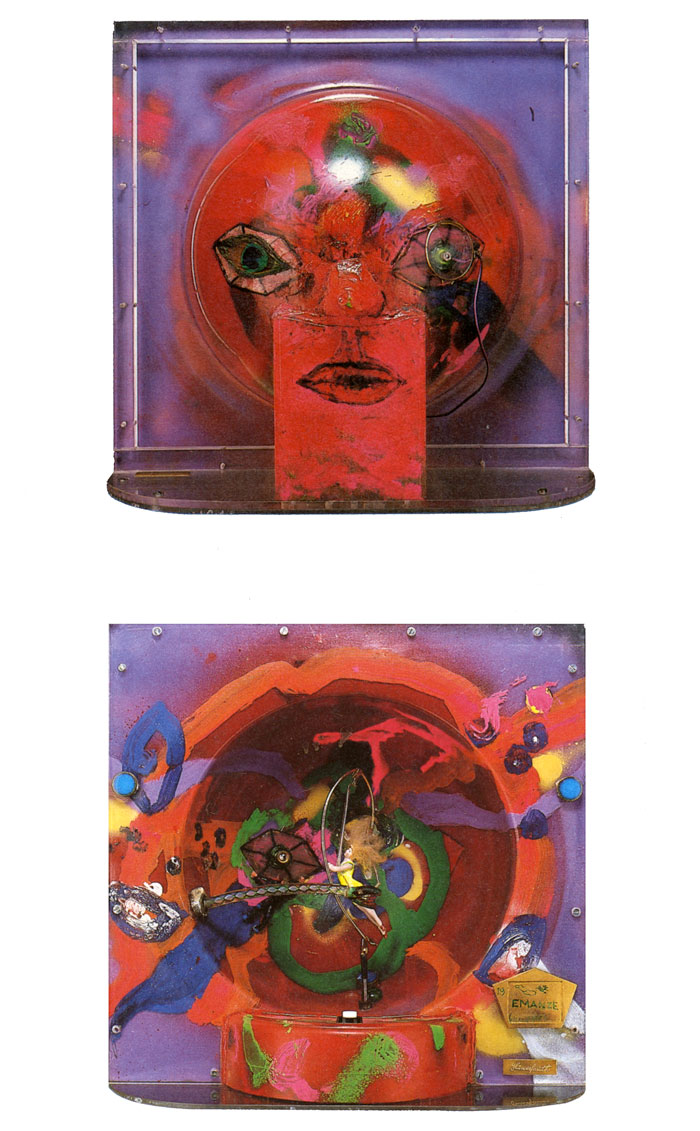
Women's libber, 1990. Speaking object

=== Single-handed exhibition catalogs / artist diaries ===
The artist began to design her first exhibition catalogs in 1978. These are some kind of a retrospective, fashioned after an artist's diary, made out of collage-like paste ins of cutouts from earlier regular exhibition brochures and press reports. These catalogs have about 50 sheets each (measurements about 20 by 23 centimeters), which she fixated together with two sturdy brass screws. The exact edition is unknown. These artist diaries are related to FLUXUS books and have to be seen as independent works.

=== Speaking boxes and objects ===
The first so-called "sprechende Kästen" (speaking boxes) she created in 1972. These are unique in their kind and not to be found by other object artists of that time. The boxes contain different objects, technical scrap which is moved motor-driven or commented acoustically with the help of an audio tape at the touch of a button. The artist developed her own manuals for these objects: 'The game begins. Grasp at the baffle collector and pull the ball down several times. At the same time you will see how the objects in the box slowly fluctuate according to their self-oscillation similar as a blast of air quietly moves the nature. Breathe deeply, keep playing with the pellets, listen, take up your thoughts, take the freedom to dream, forget your everyday life. Break away from the 'correctness' of the society, break away from the 'correctness' of the criticism, break away from the 'correctness' of science. All these are overrated correctnesses. Breathe deeply, play yourselves free, just be yourself."

With these objects Hünerfauth portrays comprehensive human and ideological thoughts as everyday occurrences: the misery of war and its phenomena, the loneliness living in mass towers and building blocks of our satellite towns ('from countless windows eyes stare into emptiness'). She shows shivering grass and first love, demonstrations (the 'Occammensch') and nature idyll, philosophy and humor ('Glasknopfbäumchen').

An example of these speaking boxes is the box Blaue Pistole (Blue Pistol) which she created in 1973. It is filled with industrial scrap. Its endless audio tape plays the artist's voice reciting a text by Meta Kristall: "Blue pistol used with pleasure by a boy's hand, now rotten as scrap in the landscape, a butterfly rocking itself on it. Sharp gunshots invade Sunday's peace, like chocolates invade the affluent societies puss, maneuver drill a man says promising." Another box she crafted in 1983 is made from plexiglass with a collaged back cover. The audio tape with Hünerfauth's voice is urging with music and a text by Meta Kristall: "War! Your voice is the otherman dead, man shoot the otherman'. Otherman shoot...' Shots are fired, Meta Kristall is crying out: "Dead! Dead! Let the murdering be! Talk to the otherman .. Otherman talks to you..." Another major work is the PopArt related speaking object "Emanze" (Women's libber, 1990) which is brightly coloured on both front and back as well as Krieg – auch Tiere leiden (War animals suffer too, 1986) and also the three-dimensional installation Rocker's Tod (The death of the biker, 1989).

The artist and gallery owner Peter Luft said Hünerfauth's art resembles Picasso's in spirit, wit, irony, simplicity, cogency and excursiveness. However, Luft believes that the artist transcends Picasso's stylistic devices precisely with the complexity of her speaking boxes: "The circle of her style is, as I feel, related to Picasso's. Of course, the shape is different; and so are the materials. While Picasso remains a painter and drawer, a designer of the surface, during most of his works, Irma Hünerfauth stepped out of the two-dimensionality to never to return. She is working three-dimensionally, in a sphere and sculpturesque. She is driving frottages coming from the graphics, ferro-montages coming from the sculptures. She loves ready-mades, combine painting and material pictures – just like Picasso. But beyond all this, she loves and practices: Contre-reliefs, machine arts, Objet trouvé and especially bruitism, which means the mixed medial synthesis of audio, literature, kinetics and at the same time theatrical staging. With presentations of this kind she is leaving Picasso far behind."

=== Kinetic vibrational objects ===
Beginning in the 1970s, she created so-called vibrational objects. These are wires, buttons, cartridges; electrical panels and other finds, that intone music of the spheres at the touch of a button. Through these interactive dynamics the access to her poetic concept is eased for art lovers; nevertheless, she says, "my work must seem as abstruse to the majority of our society". Continuing with her words: "These vibrational objects are supposed to topple the fine and precious. Imagine this takes place at a jeweler's shop. The viewer is confronted with a composition falling apart. They are constructed with the purpose to cause the elements to shiver by touching a button. They are supposed to experience the discomfort of the destruction of the beautiful".

=== Ferro-montages, Metal collages (Assemblage) ===
Hünerfauth's ferro-montages (a word invented by the artist) invaded a traditionally male artist's reserved domain. These are sculptures made from wealth garbage and scrap, like nickel-plated chrome car parts, bumpers, radiator hoods, steel ribs, steel discs, large threads, pipes, axle bearings and more. They are high-gloss objects, head-high figures and creations, which she assembled or welded together with the help of her husband. These artworks are reminiscent of religious cultural objects. The first of them – made in the late 1960s – are smaller sized bronze sculptures on a base or small table, and include ready-mades. Then, the figures became larger, for example the Iron- respectively Sunflower made from agricultural machine parts, Portrait of J.W.K. on a head-high column (grooved), Serpentina, Portrait of Mrs. Heller and especially impressive I'nstance (1977), Black Butterfly so as the admonisher Ma(h)nuel – all free-standing statuary art.

The most important of these ferro-montages bears the press-given title Occam-Mensch (Occam Human) and can be seen as her major artwork. The two meters high sculpture with gas mask, opened lungs and many symbolic exhaust pipes was created from original machine parts in 1971. It was exhibited publicly that year on the corner of Occam Street in Schwabing, a borough in the northern part of Munich. At that time the newspaper named it Occammensch (Occam human) and partly ridiculed his message. In 1990, about twenty years later, it was exhibited publicly again at the Gasteig in Munich (borough Haidhausen). It was favorably received and was printed as a poster. With this sculpture the artist wants to draw attention to climate protection and the air pollution by carbon monoxide in big cities. In the plinth with hand written ironic slogan as an wordplay "STATT LUFT – STADTLUFT (Instead of air – big city atmosphere 'smog')". Declared as "unsaleable", it accompanied the artist over decades and was reworked by the artist several times.

Then she created relief-like, more two-dimensional compositions, named metal collage (Assemblage). These were one by two meter metal plates which she decorated with scrap and finds. Some of these metal collages (Assemblage) she mounted temporarily on the exterior facade of her own house to expose them to weather and so natural corrosion. The applied materials she used to call "way too beautiful scrap". In this category also her idols are noteworthy, especially the Götzin mit Klingelbusen ( female tin god with ringing breasts), a metallically fixated female breast picture the nipples of which were made from pushable metal bell buttons. At the plinth panel with a verse from Johann Wolfgang von Goethe: "The girl's breast in the hand, the doorbell on the wall, are related. Both reveal that downstairs outside there is someone urgently begging for admittance".

=== Artist's prayer books made of micro electronic scrap ===
After the death of her husband, Hünerfauth concentrated on smaller objects because these were easier to handle by herself. She created artist's prayer books by processing micro electronical scrap, garbage from computer hardware, electronic conductors and slim-sized control panels into small-dimensioned metal collages (Assemblage). The usage of this kind of material has to be regarded as unique. The objects are now 'silent objects' again. Their small formats force to observe and face Hünerfauth's formal, graphic and physical means and possibilities. The manner of structuring prompts the viewer to a behavior she asked for during the viewing of her early abstract painting, when she told the viewers in January 1960: "Get into the painting by scanning it with your eyes, the lines will lead you. I wish for the viewers to step out of themselves during the dialogue with the artwork and to newly find themselves in another sphere of conscience."

The term 'The Artist's Prayer Books' already indicates that these artistic miniatures are meant to be ambiguous and provocative. The term is aiming at a type of text that was especially conceived for women and their intimate orientation towards God in the 19th century. Those books had a particularly magnificent design and were supposed to represent piety in public. The apparent artistry of Hünerfauth's 'The Artist's Prayer Books' still reminds of the original meaning, the doxology. Hünerfauth led a dialogue with herself and the public's expectations. Also the material (scrap) evokes reflectiveness: is the computer the new god, or the individual? For those who still did not understand, she added a motto to each artist's diary: "Don't think, wonder yourself!" "The creative force in the prayer books is so strong that it transforms the material, the application, into one single matter, which is ensouled by the personal view that possesses the same structure like her relief-like idols."

Hünerfauth is a postwar artist of the so-called "lost generation", whose artworks sold mostly directly to private as well as public collections and thus seldom appeared at international art events or on the auction market during her lifetime. The rediscovery of her work allows now a new comprehensive perspective of her artistic oeuvre.

Since 20 March 2018, two large paintings by Hünerfauth have been displayed at the Städtische Galerie im Lenbachhaus Munich. The collection 'I'm a Believer. Pop Art and contemporary art from the Lenbachhaus and the KiCo Foundation' shows Hünerfauth's paintings together with works by Rupprecht Geiger and Günter Fruhtrunk, to illustrate painting in Munich of the 1950s and 1960s.

From 12 April to 28 July 2019, Hünerfauth's work First Love was featured in the group exhibition "Straying from the Line" at the Schinkel Pavillon Berlin together with other women artists Lee Lozano and Betye Saar.

From 4 June to 3 October 2022 two major works by Hünerfauth, the speaking box To Be Like Grass and the vibration object Isolation, were shown at the 15th edition of the Triennial of Small Sculpture Fellbach under the title The Vibration of Things, an international group exhibition of contemporary women artists curated by Elke aus dem Moore.

May 19 - Jul 9, 2023. Speaking Boxes is the first posthumous solo exhibition of German artist Irma Hünerfauth (1907-1998) at Simian Art Center in Copenhagen curated by Elisa R. Linn and Lennart Wolff with first-ever Headline in the international renowned art magazine Artforum for Irma Hünerfauth by Alice Goodwin ...' Together, these kinetic assemblages speak to the crises of pollution and loneliness, industrialization and war, of the second half of the twentieth century, but they feel eerily prescient in their anticipation of the cybernetic systems that are now part of the fabric of our society'... Numerous impressions of this exhibition can be found at ArtViewer.

2024 Mudam Luxembourg, Musée d'Art Moderne Grand-Duc Jean showed the vibration object ’Augen und Glocke’(Eyes and Bell, c.1970) by Irma Hünerfauth at the group exhibition 'Radical Software: Women, Art & Computing‘ besides works by leading postwar women artists like e.g. VALIE EXPORT, Isa Genzken and Rosemarie Trockel among others. The exhibition was traveling and 2025 also on view at Kunsthalle Wien.

November 13 - December 16, 2025 Arcadia Missa Gallery in London presents the first solo exhibition in the UK devoted to German artist Irma Hünerfauth (1907–1998) since 1983, bringing together the artist’s early abstract paintings from the late 1950s and early 1960s, and her later kinetic multimedia Vibration Objects, that represents the artist’s post-WWII concerns with alienation, violence, militarization, and environmental pollution, which unfold across her oeuvre, curated text by Elisa R. Linn & Lennart Wolff. Beth Williamson, Sculpturemagazine London mentions her early canvases in line with thinkers such as Theodor Adorno and Franz Roh and that her powerful messages of her later multimedia objects are still entirely consistent with and evoke the basic instability of contemporary life. Isabelle Bucklow bringing her works in e-flux Criticism in context with Norbert Weiner’s 1948 theory of feedback, control, and communication in self-regulating systems and Jasia Reichardt’s 1968 'Cybernetic Serendipity' at London’s ICA, so as her German contemporaries Hans Haacke (and his Perspex boxes) and Isa Genzken and Gerhard Richter. HENI News marked this presentation as an important re-evaluation and as a critical posthumous development, reaffirming the artist’s kinetic and conceptual art legacy to a contemporary audience.

== Exhibitions ==
- 1946 Kammerspiele, Munich.
- 1947 BBK, Munich; Gedok, UNESCO building, Beirut, Lebanon.
- 1959 Freude junger Kunst, Kunstverein, Munich; Palais des Beaux-Arts, Paris, France; Travelling exhibition modern prints, Frankenthal.
- 1959-61 Große Kunstausstellung, Neue Gruppe, Haus der Kunst, Munich.
- 1961 Solo exhibition Städtische Galerie im Lenbachhaus, Munich; Neue Darmstädter Sezession, Darmstadt; Nouvelle école européenne, Hessenhuis, Antwerp, Belgium; Vier deutsche Künstlerinnen, Royal Scottish Academy, Edinburgh, England; Gedok, Rom, Italy; Fachoberschule, Munich.
- 1962 Staatliche Graphische Sammlung, Munich; Gedok, Kunst am Bau, Stadtmuseum, München; Solo exhibition Gallery Kasper, Lausanne, Switzerland.
- 1962/63 Travelling exhibition modern prints, Frankenthal.
- 1962-65 Freunde junger Kunst, Kunstverein, Munich.
- 1963 Frauen-Biennale, Paris, France; Internat. Aquarellausstellung, Städt. Museum, Friedrichshafen.
- 1963-69 Herbstsalon, Haus der Kunst, Munich.
- 1964 Musée d'Art Moderne, Paris, France.
- 1965 'Gruppe 7' und 'Gruppe Spur', Akademie der Bildenden Künste, Munich; Travelling exhibition USA, Karl-Schurz-Gesellschaft 'Gruppe K', Casa, Munich.
- 1966 'Querschnitt', Staatliche Graphische Sammlung, Munich; Hommage à Franz Roh, Kunstverein, Munich; Musée d'Art Moderne, Paris, France.
- 1967 'Querschnitt 67', Staatliche Graphische Sammlung, Munich; Einzelausstellung: Gallery Christa Moering, Wiesbaden; 'Fleckenburger Gespräche', internationale Aspekte der Gegenwartskunst, Hochsauerland.
- 1968 Kurfürstliches Gärtnerhaus 'Materialobjekte', Bonn.
- 1971 Zeitgenössische französische und deutsche Graphik, Travelling exhibition South America, Goethe-Institut, São Paulo, Brazil; 'Europa 2000', B. H. Corner Gallery, London, England; Herbstsalon 71, Haus der Kunst, Munich.
- 1971/72 Travelling exhibition, Kinetische Kunstobjekte, Römer Pelizaeus-Museum, Hildesheim, then 1972 Detmold and Hannover.
- 1972 Zeichnung und Graphik aus 7 Jahrhunderten, Staatliche Graphische Sammlung, Munich; 'Prisma 72', Rheinisches Landesmuseum, Bonn.
- 1974 Apportin – Hilmar – Hünerfauth, Kunstverein, Munich; Einzelausstellung: Kurfürstliches Gärtnerhaus, Bonn.
- 1975 Einzelausstellung: Goethe-Institut (Hünerfauth and Führer-Wolkenstein), Brussels, Belgium.
- 1977 Solo exhibition: Gallery Walter Koch (Hünerfauth and Führer-Wolkenstein), Munich; Solo exhibition: Gallery Querschnitt (Hünerfauth and Führer-Wolkenstein), Braunschweig; Solo exhibition: Goethe - Institut (Hünerfauth and Führer-Wolkenstein), Brussels, Belgium; 'Picasso Anmalen', Engelhorn Stiftung, Grünwald Munich: Travelling exhibition Munich, Paris, Nancy, Toulouse, Lyon, Lille, Bordeaux, France.
- 1979 Galerie im Ganserhaus, Objekt-Kästen, Wasserburg am Inn.
- 1981 Leopold-Hoesch-Museum, Düren.
- 1983 'Ökoräume', Forum des Europa-Parliaments, Straßburg, Frankreich; End of year exhibition, Wasserburg am Inn; Solo exhibition: 'IRMAnipulations', Goethe-Institut, London.
- 1984 Solo exhibition: Kulturzentrum am Gasteig, Künstlergebetbücher, Munich; Kulturzentrum Gasteig, Munich; 'Bayerische Kunst unserer Tage', Künstlerhaus, Wien, Austria; 'Klangobjekte', Sofia, Bulgaria; Kunst und Technik III, BMW-Galerie, Munich
- 1985 Kunst und Technik III, BMW-Galerie, Berlin; Tage der neuen Musik, Klangskulpturen: Städtische Galerie, Würzburg; Kulturforum, Bonn; Kunstverein, Heidelberg; Spielboden, Dornbirn; Leopold-Hoesch-Museum, Düren; Karmeliter Kloster, Frankfurt; Musik optisch, Spitäle, Würzburg; 'Kunstforum', Olympiadorf, München; Technik und Menschsein', St. Virgil, Salzburg, Austria; Bildräume', Arbeitskreis 68, Rathaus, Wasserburg am Inn; 'Kunstsalon 85', Haus der Kunst, Munich and Berlin.
- 1986 Bayerische Kunst Unserer Tage', Ernst Museum, Budapest, Hungary; Kunst und Technik, BMW-Galerie, Munich and Berlin; 'Große Kunstausstellung', Rathaus, Wasserburg am Inn.
- 1989 Umwelt-Mitwelt-Lebenswelt, Kulturzentrum am Gasteig, Munich.
- 1994 Solo exhibition: Ignaz-Günther-Haus, Stadtmuseum, Munich.
- 1995 Kunstverein Schloss Röderhof, Sachsen-Anhalt.
- 1996 Solo exhibition: Bürgerhaus, Pullach; Solo exhibition: Museum Kloster 'Unser Lieben Frauen', Magdeburg; Große Kunstausstellung, Wasserburg am Inn.
- 1998 Hünerfauth as a guest of honour at the Großen Kunstausstellung, Wasserburg am Inn.
- 2018 Group exhibition, Städtische Galerie im Lenbachhaus, Munich: 'I'm a Believer. Pop Art and contemporary art from the Lenbachhaus and the KiCo Foundation'.
- 2019 Group exhibition: 'Straying from the Line', Schinkel Pavillon, Berlin.
- 2021 Group exhibition: 'Fire demands its Fuel' curated by Elisa R. Linn & Lennart Wolff (KM Temporaer) at the invitation of Markus Lüttgen & Drei, Mönchengladbach.
- 2022 Group exhibition: 15th edition of the Triennial of Small Sculpture Fellbach 'The Vibration of Things' curated by Elke aus dem Moore.
- 2023 Solo exhibition: 'Speaking Boxes' curated by Elisa R. Linn & Lennart Wolff (KM Temporaer) SIMIAN, Copenhagen
- 2024 Group exhibition: Mudam Luxembourg – Musée d'Art Moderne Grand-Duc Jean 'Radical Software: Women, Art & Computing 1960–1991‘ curated by Michelle Cotton, assisted by Sarah Beaumont
- 2025 Group exhibition: Kunsthalle Wien Museumsquartier 'Radical Software: Women, Art & Computing 1960–1991‘ curated by Michelle Cotton
- 2025 Solo exhibition of Speaking Boxes, Vibration Objects and early Paintings, at Arcadia Missa Gallery, London.
