= Jerry Wilkerson =

American painter (1942–2007)

- Born: September 5, 1942; Beaumont, Texas
- Died: June 2, 2007 (aged 63); St. Louis, Missouri
- Known for: Painting
- Movement: Pointillistic

Jerry Oliver Wilkerson (September 5, 1942 in Texas – June 2, 2007) was a St. Louis, Missouri artist known for his contemporary pointillistic style of painting, and as a supporter of local business and talent.

== Biography ==
After completing his BS at Lamar University in Beaumont, Texas, in 1966, Wilkerson obtained his MFA (1968) from Washington University in St. Louis. He settled in St. Louis following military service in the Army from 1968 - 1970. Wilkerson exhibited at galleries in St. Louis, Kansas City, New Orleans, New York City, and Carmel, California. His works are represented in several public collections including the St. Louis Art Museum, the Baltimore Museum of Art, the Delaware Art Museum in Wilmington, the Tucson Museum of Art, and the Evansville Museum of Arts and Science in Evansville, Indiana. The major theme of his work is food — including lobsters, burgers, a Warholesque Campbell's Pork and Beans can, bananas, cherries, apples, pears, fortune cookies, and cups of coffee. Wilkerson died of cancer at age 63.
