= Magical realism =

Style of literary fiction and art

Magical realism, magic realism, or marvellous realism is a style or genre of fiction and art that presents a realistic view of the world while also incorporating magical elements, often blurring the lines between speculation and reality. Magical realism is the most commonly used of the three terms and refers to literature, in particular, with magical or supernatural phenomena presented in an otherwise real-world or mundane setting, and is commonly found in novels and dramatic performances. In his article "Magical Realism in Spanish American Literature", Luis Leal explains the difference between magic literature and magical realism, stating that, "Magical realism is not magic literature either. Its aim, unlike that of magic, is to express emotions, not to evoke them." Despite including certain magical elements, it is generally considered to be a different genre from fantasy because magical realism uses a substantial amount of realistic detail and employs magical elements to make a point about reality, while fantasy stories are often separated from reality. The two are also distinguished in that magical realism is closer to literary fiction than to fantasy, which is instead a type of genre fiction. Magical realism is often seen as an amalgamation of real and magical elements that produces a more inclusive writing form than either literary realism or fantasy.

== Description ==
The term magic realism is broadly descriptive rather than critically rigorous. Matthew Strecher (1999) defines it as "what happens when a highly detailed, realistic setting is invaded by something too strange to believe." The term and its wide definition can often become confused, as many writers are categorized as magical realists. The term was influenced by a German and Italian painting style of the 1920s, which was given the same name. In The Art of Fiction, British novelist and critic David Lodge defines magical realism: "when marvellous and impossible events occur in what otherwise purports to be a realistic narrative—is an effect especially associated with contemporary Latin American fiction (for example the work of the Colombian novelist Gabriel García Márquez) but it is also encountered in novels from other continents, such as those of Günter Grass, Salman Rushdie and Milan Kundera. All these writers have lived through great historical convulsions and wrenching personal upheavals, which they feel cannot be adequately represented in a discourse of undisturbed realism", citing Kundera's 1979 novel The Book of Laughter and Forgetting as an exemplar. Michiko Kakutani writes that "The transactions between the extraordinary and the mundane that occur in so much Latin American fiction are not merely a literary technique, but also a mirror of a reality in which the fantastic is frequently part of everyday life." Magical realism often mixes history and fantasy, as in Salman Rushdie's Midnight's Children, in which the children born at midnight on August 15, 1947, the moment of India's independence, are telepathically linked.

Irene Guenther (1995) tackles the German roots of the term, which first began alongside the alternative label "Neue Sachlichkeit", or "New Objectivity", and explicates how an earlier magic realist art is related to a later magic realist literature. Meanwhile, and despite Guenther's observations on the term's Germanic origin, magical realism is often associated with Latin-American literature, including founders of the genre, particularly the authors Gabriel García Márquez, Isabel Allende, Jorge Luis Borges, Juan Rulfo, Miguel Ángel Asturias, Elena Garro, Carrión Grimes, Mireya Robles, Rómulo Gallegos, Alejo Carpentier, and Arturo Uslar Pietri. In English literature, its chief exponents include Neil Gaiman, Salman Rushdie, Alice Hoffman, Louis De Bernieres, Nick Joaquin, Joanne Harris and Nicola Barker. In Russian literature, key proponents include Mikhail Bulgakov, Soviet dissident Andrei Sinyavsky, and the playwright Nina Sadur. In Bengali literature, prominent writers of magic realism include Nabarun Bhattacharya, Akhteruzzaman Elias, Shahidul Zahir, Jibanananda Das and Syed W, aliullah. In Kannada literature, the writers Shivaram Karanth and Devanur Mahadeva have infused magical realism in their most prominent works. In Japanese literature, one of the most important authors of this genre is Haruki Murakami. In Chinese literature, the best-known writer of the style is Mo Yan, the 2012 Nobel Prize laureate in Literature for his "hallucinatory realism". In Polish literature, magic realism is represented by Olga Tokarczuk, the 2018 Nobel Prize laureate in Literature.

== Etymology and literary origins ==
=== Precursors ===
19th-century Romantic writers such as E. T. A. Hoffmann and Nikolai Gogol, especially in their fairy tales and short stories, have been credited with originating a trend within Romanticism that contained "a European magical realism where the realms of fantasy are continuously encroaching and populating the realms of the real". In the words of Anatoly Lunacharsky:

Unlike other romantics, Hoffmann was a satirist. He saw the reality surrounding him with unusual keenness, and in this sense, he was one of the first and sharpest realists. The smallest details of everyday life, funny features in the people around him, with extraordinary honesty, were noticed by him. In this sense, his works are a whole mountain of delightfully sketched caricatures of reality. But he was not limited to them. Often, he created nightmares similar to Gogol's Portrait. Gogol is a student of Hoffmann and is extremely dependent on Hoffmann in many works, for example, in Portrait and The Nose. In them, just like Hoffmann, he frightens with a nightmare and contrasts it to a positive beginning ... Hoffmann's dream was free, graceful, attractive, cheerful, to infinity. Reading his fairy tales, you understand that Hoffmann is, in essence, a kind, clear person, because he could tell a child such things as The Nutcracker or The Royal Bride – these pearls of human fantasy.

Philosopher Nikolai Berdyaev and poet Andrei Bely used the term "mystical realism" (Russian: мистический реализм) in the foreword to 1907's Philosophical, Social and Literary Experiences (1900-1906), in reference to a genre of literature that merges realism with mystical revelation, particularly noting its emphasis on the writer's own spiritual understanding, rather than established dogma. The pair note the later works of Fyodor Dostoevsky, particularly Ivan Fyodorovich Karamazov's storyline in The Brothers Karamazov (1879–1880), as an example of this style, arguing that Ivan's relationship with Smerdyakov and the devil goes "beyond reality and instead exists within a more abstract and metaphysical realm". They also note similar divine features between Stavrogin and Shatov in Demons (1871–1972), the protagonist and Svidrigailov in Crime and Punishment (1866), and the protagonist and Nastasya Filippovna and Rogozhin in The Idiot (1868–1869) Other authors discussed include Gogol, Alexander Pushkin, and Leo Tolstoy. Academic Ceylan Özdemir noted this concept of "mystical realism" not as synonymous with magical realism, but as a style that precluded the more religious side of magical realism.

In her essay "Russian Magical Realism and Pelevin as Its Exponent" (2009), Alexandra Berlina observed that seven years prior to Franz Roh's coining of the term magischer Realismus, Viktor Shklovsky's essay "Art as a Device; Theory of Prose" (1918) discussed a topic "strikingly reminiscent". The essay largely discussed Tolstoy and his story Kholstomer (1986) and the use of "the estrangement of familiar objects", due to its narrator being a horse.

In Serge Charchoune's 1932 article "Magical Realism" (Russian: "Магический реализм"), he notes his own work's use of symbolism, emotional depth, and blurring the distinction between reality and magic follows Edmond Jaloux's definition of the magic realism genre. In his response to this article, critic Gleb Struve noted the works of himself, Gaito Gazdanov, Irina Odoyevtseva, and Nina Berberova as "quintessentially portraying magical realism". Mikhail Bulgakov's novel The Master and Margarita (written: 1928 and 1940; published: 1966–1967) was called "one of the great works of magical realism" by The Cambridge Companion to European Novelists (2012), noting it as a continuation of the style of Pushkin, Gogol, Dostoevsky and Tolstoy, and a sign of a separate lineage of magical realism to the Latin American school.

=== Etymology ===
The term first appeared as the German magischer Realismus ('magical realism'). In 1925, German art critic Franz Roh used magischer Realismus to refer to a painterly style known as Neue Sachlichkeit ('New Objectivity'), an alternative to expressionism that was championed by German museum director Gustav Hartlaub. Roh identified magic realism's accurate detail, smooth photographic clarity, and portrayal of the 'magical' nature of the rational world; it reflected the uncanniness of people and our modern technological environment. He also believed that magic realism was related to, but distinct from, surrealism, due to magic realism's focus on material objects and the actual existence of things in the world, as opposed to surrealism's more abstract, psychological, and subconscious reality.

German magic-realist paintings influenced the Italian writer Massimo Bontempelli, who has been called the first to apply magic realism to writing, aiming to capture the fantastic, mysterious nature of reality. In 1926, he founded the magic realist magazine 900. Novecento, and his writings influenced Belgian magic realist writers Johan Daisne and Hubert Lampo.

Roh's magic realism also influenced writers in Hispanic America, where it was translated in 1927 as realismo mágico. Venezuelan writer Arturo Uslar-Pietri, who had known Bontempelli, wrote influential magic-realist short stories in the 1920s and 30s that focused on the mystery and reality of how we live. Luis Leal attests that Uslar Pietri seemed to have been the first to use the term realismo mágico in literature, in 1948. There is evidence that Mexican writer Elena Garro used the same term to describe the works of E. T. A. Hoffmann, but dismissed her own work as a part of the genre. French-Russian Cuban writer Alejo Carpentier, who rejected Roh's magic realism as tiresome pretension, developed his related concept lo real maravilloso ('marvelous realism') in 1949. Maggie Ann Bowers writes that marvelous-realist literature and art expresses "the seemingly opposed perspectives of a pragmatic, practical and tangible approach to reality and an acceptance of magic and superstition" within an environment of differing cultures.

Magic realism was later used to describe the uncanny realism by such American painters as Ivan Albright, Peter Blume, Paul Cadmus, Gray Foy, George Tooker, Brian Connelly, and Viennese-born Henry Koerner, among other artists, during the 1940s and 1950s. However, in contrast with its use in literature, magic realist art does not often include overtly fantastic or magical content, but rather, it looks at the mundane through a hyper-realistic and often mysterious lens.

The term magical realism, as opposed to magic realism, first emerged in the 1955 essay "Magical Realism in Spanish American Fiction" by critic Angel Flores in reference to writing that combines aspects of magic realism and marvelous realism. While Flores named Jorge Luis Borges as the first magical realist, he failed to acknowledge either Carpentier or Uslar Pietri for bringing Roh's magic realism to Latin America. Borges is often seen as a predecessor of magical realists, with only Flores considering him a true magical realist. After Flores's essay, there was a resurgence of interest in marvelous realism, which, after the Cuban revolution of 1959, led to the term magical realism being applied to a new type of literature known for matter-of-fact portrayal of magical events.

=== Origins ===
Literary magic realism originated in Latin America. Writers often traveled between their home country and European cultural hubs, such as Paris or Berlin, and were influenced by the art movement of the time. Cuban writer Alejo Carpentier and Venezuelan Arturo Uslar-Pietri, for example, were strongly influenced by European artistic movements, such as Surrealism, during their stays in Paris in the 1920s and 1930s. One major event that linked painterly and literary magic realism was the translation and publication of Franz Roh's book into Spanish by Spain's Revista de Occidente in 1927, headed by major literary figure José Ortega y Gasset. "Within a year, Magic Realism was being applied to the prose of European authors in the literary circles of Buenos Aires." Between 1940 and 1950, the precursors of magical realism appeared in Latin American literature, including Jorge Luis Borges and his story Historia universal de la infamia in 1935. Alejo Carpentier's novel The Kingdom of This World, published in 1949, is often characterized as an important harbinger of magic realism, which reached its canonical incarnation in Gabriel García Márquez's novel One Hundred Years of Solitude (1967). García Marquez cited Kafka's "The Metamorphosis" as a formative influence: "The first line almost knocked me out of bed. It begins: 'As Gregor Samsa awoke from uneasy dreams, he found himself transformed in his bed into a gigantic insect.' When I read that line, I thought to myself I didn't know anyone was allowed to write things like that. If I had known, I would have started writing a long time ago." He also cited the stories told to him by his grandmother: "She told me things that sounded supernatural and fantastic, but she told them with complete naturalness. She did not change her expression at all when telling her stories, and everyone was surprised. In previous attempts to write One Hundred Years of Solitude, I tried to tell the story without believing in it. I discovered that what I had to was believe in them myself and them write them with the same expression with which my grandmother told them: with a brick face."

The theoretical implications of visual art's magic realism greatly influenced European and Latin American literature. Italian Massimo Bontempelli, for instance, claimed that literature could be a means to create a collective consciousness by "opening new mythical and magical perspectives on reality", and used his writings to inspire an Italian nation governed by Fascism. Uslar Pietri was closely associated with Roh's form of magic realism and knew Bontempelli in Paris. Rather than follow Carpentier's developing versions of "the (Latin) American marvelous real", Uslar Pietri's writings emphasize "the mystery of human living amongst the reality of life". He believed magic realism was "a continuation of the vanguardia [or avant-garde] modernist experimental writings of Latin America".

== Characteristics ==
The extent to which the characteristics below apply to a given magic realist text varies. Every text is different and employs a smattering of the qualities listed here. However, they accurately portray what one might expect from a magic realist text.

=== Fantastical realism elements ===
Magical realism portrays fantastical events in an otherwise realistic tone. It brings fables, folk tales, and myths into contemporary social relevance. Fantasy traits given to characters, such as levitation, telepathy, and telekinesis, help to encompass modern political realities that can be phantasmagorical.

=== Real-world setting ===
The existence of fantastic elements in the everyday world provides the basis for magical realism. Writers do not invent new worlds, but rather, they reveal the magical in the existing world, as was done by Gabriel García Márquez, who wrote the seminal work One Hundred Years of Solitude. In the world of magical realism, the supernatural realm blends with the natural, familiar world. Importantly, for the characters in a work of magical realism, what may seem extraordinary or even uncanny (e.g. an angel falling from the sky) is considered ordinary for the characters themselves.

=== Authorial reticence ===
Authorial reticence is the "deliberate withholding of information and explanations about the disconcerting fictitious world". The narrator is indifferent, a characteristic enhanced by this absence of explanation of fantastic events; the story proceeds with "logical precision" as if nothing extraordinary had taken place. Magical events are presented as ordinary occurrences; therefore, the reader accepts the marvelous as normal and common.

=== Plenitude ===
In his essay "The Baroque and the Marvelous Real", Cuban writer Alejo Carpentier defines the baroque by a lack of emptiness, a departure from structure or rules, and an "extraordinary" abundance (plenitude) of disorienting detail. (He cites Mondrian as its opposite.) From this angle, Carpentier views the baroque as a layering of elements, which translates easily into the postcolonial or transcultural Latin-American atmosphere that he emphasizes in The Kingdom of this World. "America, a continent of symbiosis, mutations ... mestizaje, engenders the baroque", made explicit by elaborate Aztec temples and associative Nahuatl poetry. These mixing ethnicities grow together with the American baroque; the space in between is where the "marvelous real" is seen. Marvelous: not meaning beautiful and pleasant, but extraordinary, strange, and excellent. Such a complex system of layering—encompassed in the Latin-American "boom" novel, such as One Hundred Years of Solitude—aims towards "translating the scope of America".

=== Hybridity ===
Magical realism plot lines characteristically employ hybrid multiple planes of reality that take place in "inharmonious arenas of such opposites as urban and rural, and Western and indigenous".

=== Metafiction ===
This trait centers on the reader's role in literature. With its multiple realities and specific reference to the reader's world, it explores the impact fiction has on reality, reality on fiction, and the reader's role in between; as such, it is well suited for drawing attention to social or political criticism. Furthermore, it is the tool paramount in the execution of a related and major magic-realist phenomenon: textualization. This term defines two conditions—first, where a fictitious reader enters the story within a story while reading it, making them self-conscious of their status as readers—and secondly, where the textual world enters into the reader's (real) world. Good sense would negate this process, but "magic" is the flexible convention that allows it.

=== Heightened awareness of mystery ===
Magic realist literature tends to leave out explanation of its magical element or obfuscate elements of the story, creating a sense of confusion and mystery. For example, when reading One Hundred Years of Solitude, the reader must let go of pre-existing ties to conventional exposition, plot advancement, linear time structure, scientific reason, etc., to strive for a state of heightened awareness of life's connectedness or hidden meanings in order for the book to begin to make sense. Luis Leal articulates this feeling as "to seize the mystery that breathes behind things", and supports the claim by saying a writer must heighten his senses to the point of estado limite ('limit state' or 'extreme') in order to realize all levels of reality, most importantly that of mystery.

=== Political critique ===
Magic realism contains an "implicit criticism of society, particularly the elite". Especially with regard to Latin America, the style breaks from the inarguable discourse of "privileged centers of literature". This is a mode primarily about and for "ex-centrics": the geographically, socially, and economically marginalized. Therefore, magic realism's "alternative world" works to correct the reality of established viewpoints (like realism, naturalism, modernism). Magic-realist texts, under this logic, are subversive texts, revolutionary against socially-dominant forces. Alternatively, the socially-dominant may implement magical realism to disassociate themselves from their "power discourse". Theo D'haen calls this change in perspective "decentering".

In his doctoral thesis Magical Insurrections: Cultural Resistance and the Magic Realist Novel in Latin America, (University of Essex, 1996), William Spindler argues that there is an underlying theme of cultural resistance in the Latin American magic realist novel, which draws its sustenance from the counter-hegemonic characteristics of popular culture. The thesis explores how the notion of cultural resistance has been incorporated into five Latin American magic realist novels: Men of Maize by Miguel Angel Asturias, The Kingdom of This World by Alejo Carpentier, Jose Maria Arguedas' Deep Rivers, Gabriel García Márquez' One Hundred Years of Solitude and Abel Posse's Daimón (1978). Other Latin American texts are also used for comparative purposes. The thesis explores the literary, historical and ideological characteristics of the Latin American magic realist novel in relation to cultural resistance, language, hegemony and popular culture in what Spindler calls the "political economy" of magic realism.

In his review of Gabriel Garcia Márquez's novel, Chronicle of a Death Foretold, Salman Rushdie argues that the formal experiment of magic realism allows political ideas to be expressed in ways that might not be possible through more established literary forms:

"El realismo mágico", magic realism, at least as practised by Márquez, is a development out of Surrealism that expresses a genuinely "Third World" consciousness. It deals with what Naipaul has called "half-made" societies, in which the impossibly old struggles against the appallingly new, in which public corruptions and private anguishes are somehow more garish and extreme than they ever get in the so-called "North", where centuries of wealth and power have formed thick layers over the surface of what's really going on. In the works of Márquez, as in the world he describes, impossible things happen constantly, and quite plausibly, out in the open under the midday sun.

== Major topics in criticism ==
=== Ambiguities in definition ===
Mexican critic Luis Leal summed up the difficulty of defining magical realism by writing, "If you can explain it, then it's not magical realism." He offers his own definition by writing, "Without thinking of the concept of magical realism, each writer gives expression to a reality he observes in the people. To me, magical realism is an attitude on the part of the characters in the novel toward the world", or toward nature.

Leal and Guenther both quote Arturo Uslar-Pietri, who described "man as a mystery surrounded by realistic facts. A poetic prediction or a poetic denial of reality. What for lack of another name could be called a magical realism."

=== Western and native worldviews ===
The critical perspective towards magical realism as a conflict between reality and abnormality stems from the Western reader's disassociation with mythology, a root of magical realism more easily understood by non-Western cultures. Western confusion regarding magical realism is due to the "conception of the real" created in a magical realist text: rather than explain reality using natural or physical laws, as in typical Western texts, magical realist texts create a reality "in which the relation between incidents, characters, and setting could not be based upon or justified by their status within the physical world or their normal acceptance by bourgeois mentality."

Guatemalan author William Spindler's article, "Magic realism: A Typology", suggests that there are three kinds of magic realism, which however are by no means incompatible:

- European "metaphysical" magic realism, with its sense of estrangement and the uncanny, exemplified by Kafka's fiction;
- "ontological" magical realism, characterized by "matter-of-factness" in relating "inexplicable" events; and
- "anthropological" magical realism, where a Native worldview is set side by side with the Western rational worldview.

Spindler's typology of magic realism has been criticized as:

[A]n act of categorization which seeks to define Magic Realism as a culturally specific project, by identifying for his readers those (non-modern) societies where myth and magic persist and where Magic Realism might be expected to occur. There are objections to this analysis. Western rationalism models may not actually describe Western modes of thinking and it is possible to conceive of instances where both orders of knowledge are simultaneously possible.

=== Lo real maravilloso ===
Alejo Carpentier originated the term lo real maravilloso (roughly 'the marvelous real') in the prologue to his novel The Kingdom of this World (1949); however, there is some debate whether he is truly a magical realist writer, or simply a precursor and source of inspiration. Maggie Bowers claims he is widely acknowledged as the originator of Latin American magical realism (as both a novelist and critic); she describes Carpentier's conception as a kind of heightened reality where elements of the miraculous can appear while seeming natural and unforced. She suggests that by disassociating himself and his writings from Roh's painterly magic realism, Carpentier aimed to show how—by virtue of Latin America's varied history, geography, demography, politics, myths, and beliefs—improbable and marvelous things are made possible. Furthermore, Carpentier's meaning is that Latin America is a land filled with marvels, and that "writing about this land automatically produces a literature of marvelous reality."

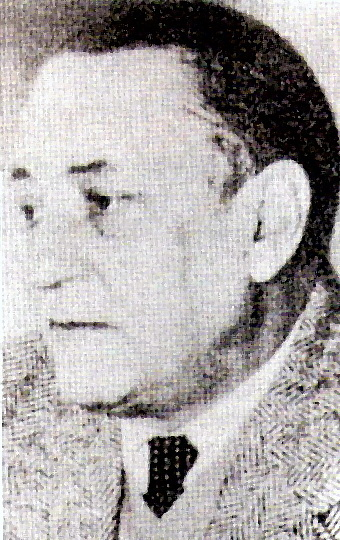
Alejo Carpentier

"The marvelous" may be easily confused with magical realism, as both modes introduce supernatural events without surprising the implied author. In both, these magical events are expected and accepted as everyday occurrences. However, the marvelous world is a unidimensional world. The implied author believes that anything can happen here, as the entire world is filled with supernatural beings and situations to begin with. Fairy tales are a good example of marvelous literature. The important idea in defining the marvelous is that readers understand that this fictional world is different from the world where they live. The "marvelous" one-dimensional world differs from the bidimensional world of magical realism because, in the latter, the supernatural realm blends with the natural, familiar world (arriving at the combination of two layers of reality: bidimensionality). While some use the terms magical realism and lo real maravilloso interchangeably, the key difference lies in the focus.

Critic Luis Leal attests that Carpentier was an originating pillar of the magical realist style by implicitly referring to the latter's critical works, writing that "The existence of the marvelous real is what started magical realist literature, which some critics claim is the truly American literature." It can consequently be drawn that Carpentier's lo real maravilloso is especially distinct from 'magical realism' by the fact that the former applies specifically to América (the American content). On that note, Lee A. Daniel categorizes critics of Carpentier into three groups: those that do not consider him a magical realist whatsoever (Ángel Flores), those that call him "a mágicorealista writer with no mention of his 'lo real maravilloso' (Gómez Gil, Jean Franco, Carlos Fuentes)", and those that use the two terms interchangeably (Fernando Alegria, Luis Leal, Emir Rodriguez Monegal).

=== Latin American exclusivity ===
Ángel Flores states that magical realism is an international commodity but that it has a Hispanic birthplace, writing that "Magical realism is a continuation of the romantic realist tradition of Spanish language literature and its European counterparts." There is disagreement between those who see magical realism as a Latin American invention and those who see it as the global product of a postmodern world. Guenther concludes, "Conjecture aside, it is in Latin America that [magic realism] was primarily seized by literary criticism and was, through translation and literary appropriation, transformed." Magic realism has been internationalized: dozens of non-Hispanic writers are categorized as such, and many believe that it truly is an international commodity.

=== Postmodernism ===
Some have argued that connecting magical realism to postmodernism is a logical next step. To further connect the two concepts, there are descriptive commonalities between the two that Belgian critic Theo D'haen addresses in his essay, "Magical Realism and Postmodernism". While authors such as Günter Grass, Thomas Bernhard, Peter Handke, Italo Calvino, John Fowles, Angela Carter, John Banville, Michel Tournier, Willem Brakman, and Louis Ferron might be widely considered postmodernist, they can "just as easily be categorized ... magic realist". A list has been compiled of characteristics one might typically attribute to postmodernism, but that also could describe literary magic realism: "self-reflexiveness, metafiction, eclecticism, redundancy, multiplicity, discontinuity, intertextuality, parody, the dissolution of character and narrative instance, the erasure of boundaries, and the destabilization of the reader". To further connect the two, magical realism and postmodernism share the themes of post-colonial discourse, in which jumps in time and focus cannot really be explained with scientific but rather with magical reasoning; textualization (of the reader); and metafiction.

Concerning attitude toward audience, the two have, some argue, a lot in common. Magical realist works do not seek to primarily satisfy a popular audience, but instead, a sophisticated audience that must be attuned to noticing textual "subtleties". While the postmodern writer condemns escapist literature (like fantasy, crime, ghost fiction), they are inextricably related to it concerning readership. There are two modes in postmodern literature: one, commercially successful pop fiction, and the other, philosophy, better suited to intellectuals. A singular reading of the first mode will render a distorted or reductive understanding of the text. The fictitious reader—such as Aureliano from 100 Years of Solitude—is the hostage used to express the writer's anxiety on this issue of who is reading the work and to what ends, and of how the writer is forever reliant upon the needs and desires of readers (the market). The magic realist writer with difficulty must reach a balance between saleability and intellectual integrity. Wendy Faris, talking about magic realism as a contemporary phenomenon that leaves modernism for postmodernism, says, "Magic realist fictions do seem more youthful and popular than their modernist predecessors, in that they often (though not always) cater with unidirectional story lines to our basic desire to hear what happens next. Thus they may be more clearly designed for the entertainment of readers."

== Comparison with related genres ==
When attempting to define what something is, it is often helpful to define what something is not. Many literary critics attempt to classify novels and literary works in only one genre, such as "romantic" or "naturalist", not always taking into account that many works fall into multiple categories. Much discussion is cited from Maggie Ann Bowers' book Magic(al) Realism, wherein she attempts to delimit the terms magic realism and magical realism by examining the relationships with other genres such as realism, surrealism, fantastic literature, science fiction and its African version, the animist realism.

=== Realism ===
Literary realism is an attempt to create a depiction of actual life; a novel does not simply rely on what it presents but how it presents it. In this way, a realist narrative acts as framework by which the reader constructs a world using the raw materials of life. Understanding both realism and magical realism within the realm of a narrative mode is key to understanding both terms. Magical realism "relies upon the presentation of real, imagined or magical elements as if they were real. It relies upon realism, but only so that it can stretch what is acceptable as real to its limits." Literary theorist Kornelije Kvas wrote that "what is created in magic(al) realism works is a fictional world close to reality, marked by a strong presence of the unusual and the fantastic, in order to point out, among other things, the contradictions and shortcomings of society. The presence of the element of the fantastic does not violate the manifest coherence of a work that is characteristic of traditional realist literature. Fantastic (magical) elements appear as part of everyday reality, function as saviors of the human against the onslaught of conformism, evil and totalitarianism. Moreover, in magical realism works we find objective narration characteristic of traditional, 19th-century realism."

As a simple point of comparison, Roh's differentiation between expressionism and post-expressionism as described in German Art in the 20th Century, may be applied to magic realism and realism. Realism pertains to the terms "history", "mimetic", "familiarization", "empiricism/logic", "narration", "closure-ridden/reductive naturalism", and "rationalization/cause and effect". On the other hand, magic realism encompasses the terms "myth/legend", "fantastic/supplementation", "defamiliarization", "mysticism/magic", "meta-narration", "open-ended/expansive romanticism", and "imagination/negative capability".

=== Surrealism ===
Surrealism is often confused with magical realism as they both explore illogical or non-realist aspects of humanity and existence. There is a strong historical connection between Franz Roh's concept of magic realism and surrealism, as well as the resulting influence on Carpentier's marvelous reality; however, important differences remain. Surrealism "is most distanced from magical realism [in that] the aspects that it explores are associated not with material reality but with the imagination and the mind, and in particular it attempts to express the 'inner life' and psychology of humans through art". It seeks to express the sub-conscious, unconscious, the repressed and inexpressible. Magical realism, on the other hand, rarely presents the extraordinary in the form of a dream or a psychological experience. "To do so", Bowers writes, "takes the magic of recognizable material reality and places it into the little understood world of the imagination. The ordinariness of magical realism's magic relies on its accepted and unquestioned position in tangible and material reality."

=== Fabulism ===
Fabulism traditionally refers to fables, parables, and myths, and is sometimes used in contemporary contexts for authors whose work falls within or relates to magical realism.

Though often used to refer to works of magical realism, fabulism incorporates fantasy elements into reality, using myths and fables to critique the exterior world and offer direct allegorical interpretations. Austrian-American child psychologist Bruno Bettelheim suggested that fairy tales have psychological merit. They are used to translate trauma into a context that people can more easily understand and help to process difficult truths. Bettelheim posited that the darkness and morality of traditional fairy tales allowed children to grapple with questions of fear through symbolism. Fabulism helped to work through these complexities and, in the words of Bettelheim, "make physical what is otherwise ephemeral or ineffable in an attempt ... of understanding those things that we struggle the most to talk about: loss, love, transition."

Author Amber Sparks described fabulism as blending fantastical elements into a realistic setting. Crucial to the genre, said Sparks, is that the elements are often borrowed from specific myths, fairy tales, and folktales. Unlike magical realism, it does not just use general magical elements, but directly incorporates details from well known stories. "Our lives are bizarre, meandering, and fantastic", said Hannah Gilham of the Washington Square Review regarding fabulism. "Shouldn't our fiction reflect that?"

While magical realism is traditionally used to refer to works that are Latin American in origin, fabulism is not tied to any specific culture. Rather than focusing on political realities, fabulism tends to focus on the entirety of the human experience through the mechanization of fairy tales and myths. This can be seen in the works of C. S. Lewis, whose biographer, A.N. Wilson, referred to him as the greatest fabulist of the 20th century. His 1956 novel Till We Have Faces has been referenced as a fabulist retelling. This re-imagining of the story of Cupid and Psyche uses an age-old myth to impart moralistic knowledge on the reader. A Washington Post review of a Lewis biography discusses how his work creates "a fiction" in order to deliver a lesson. Says the Post of Lewis, "The fabulist ... illuminates the nature of things through a tale both he and his auditors, or readers, know to be an ingenious analogical invention."

Italo Calvino is an example of a writer in the genre who uses the term fabulist. Calvino is best known for his book trilogy, Our Ancestors, a collection of moral tales told through surrealist fantasy; the trilogy consists of The Cloven Viscount, The Baron in the Trees, and The Nonexistent Knight. Like many fabulist collections, his work is often classified as allegories for children. Calvino wanted fiction, like folk tales, to act as a teaching device. "Time and again, Calvino insisted on the 'educational potential' of the fable and its function as a moral exemplum", wrote journalist Ian Thomson about the Italian Fabulist.

While reviewing the work of Romanian-born American theater director Andrei Şerban, New York Times critic Mel Gussow coined the term "The New Fabulism". Şerban is famous for his reinventions in the art of staging and directing, known for directing works like "The Stag King" and "The Serpent Woman", both fables adapted into plays by Carl Gozzi. Gussow defined "The New Fabulism" as "taking ancient myths and turn(ing) them into morality tales", In Ed Menta's book, The Magic Behind the Curtain, he explores Şerban's work and influence within the context of American theatre. He wrote that the Fabulist style allowed Şerban to neatly combine technical form and his own imagination. Through directing fabulist works, Şerban can inspire an audience with innate goodness and romanticism through the magic of theatre. "The New Fabulism has allowed Şerban to pursue his own ideals of achieving on sage the naivete of a children's theater", wrote Menta. "It is in this simplicity, this innocence, this magic that Şerban finds any hope for contemporary theatre at all."

=== Fantasy ===
Fantasy and magic realism are commonly held to be unrelated apart from some shared inspirations in mythology and folklore. Amaryll Beatrice Chanady distinguishes magical realist literature from fantasy literature ("the fantastic") based on differences between three shared dimensions: the use of antinomy (the simultaneous presence of two conflicting codes), the inclusion of events that cannot be integrated into a logical framework, and the use of authorial reticence. In fantasy, the presence of the supernatural code is perceived as problematic, something that draws special attention—where in magical realism, the presence of the supernatural is accepted. In fantasy, while authorial reticence creates a disturbing effect on the reader, it works to integrate the supernatural into the natural framework in magical realism. This integration is made possible in magical realism as the author presents the supernatural as being equally valid to the natural. There is no hierarchy between the two codes. The ghost of Melquíades in Márquez's One Hundred Years of Solitude or the baby ghost in Toni Morrison's Beloved who visit or haunt the inhabitants of their previous residence are both presented by the narrator as ordinary occurrences; the reader, therefore, accepts the marvelous as normal and common.

To Clark Zlotchew, the differentiating factor between the fantastic and magical realism is that in fantastic literature, such as Kafka's The Metamorphosis, there is a hesitation experienced by the protagonist, implied author or reader in deciding whether to attribute natural or supernatural causes to an unsettling event, or between rational or irrational explanations. Fantastic literature has also been defined as a piece of narrative in which there is a constant faltering between belief and non-belief in the supernatural or extraordinary event.

In Leal's view, writers of fantasy literature, such as Borges, can create "new worlds, perhaps new planets. By contrast, writers like García Márquez, who use magical realism, don't create new worlds, but suggest the magical in our world." In magical realism, the supernatural realm blends with the natural, familiar world. This twofold world of magical realism differs from the onefold world that can be found in fairy-tale and fantasy literature.

Prominent English-language fantasy writers have rejected definitions of "magic realism" as something other than a synonym for fantasy fiction. Gene Wolfe said, "magic realism is fantasy written by people who speak Spanish", and Terry Pratchett said magic realism "is like a polite way of saying you write fantasy".

=== Animist realism ===
Animist realism is a term for conceptualizing the African literature that has been written based on the strong presence of the imaginary ancestor, the traditional religion and especially the animism of African cultures. The term was used by Pepetela (1989) and Harry Garuba (2003) to be a new conception of magic realism in African literature.

=== Science fiction ===
While science fiction and magical realism both bend the notion of what is real, toy with human imagination, and are forms of (often fantastical) fiction, they differ greatly. Bower's cites Aldous Huxley's Brave New World as a novel that exemplifies the science fiction novel's requirement of a "rational, physical explanation for any unusual occurrences". The protagonists' dystopian experiences, while fantastical, are communicated in reference to real-life technologies and social developments, such as industrialization, mood-altering chemicals, or in vitro fertilisation. Bowers argues that "The science fiction narrative's distinct difference from magical realism is that it is set in a world different from any known reality and its realism resides in the fact that we can recognize it as a possibility for our future. Unlike magical realism, it does not have a realistic setting that is recognizable in relation to any past or present reality."

== Major works and authors ==
Although critics and writers debate which authors or works fall within the magical realism genre, the following authors represent the narrative mode. Within the Latin American world, the most iconic of magical realist writers are Jorge Luis Borges, Isabel Allende, and Nobel Laureate Gabriel García Márquez, whose novel One Hundred Years of Solitude was an instant worldwide success.

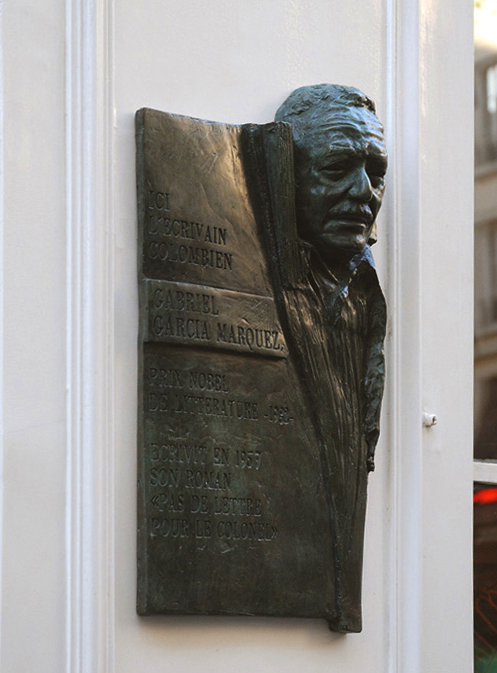
Plaque of Gabriel García Márquez, Paris

García Márquez confessed: "My most important problem was destroying the line of demarcation that separates what seems real from what seems fantastic." Allende was the first Latin American woman writer recognized outside the continent. Her best-known novel, The House of the Spirits, is arguably similar to García Márquez's style of magical realist writing. Another notable novelist is Laura Esquivel, whose Like Water for Chocolate tells the story of the domestic life of women living on the margins of their families and society. The novel's protagonist, Tita, is kept from happiness and marriage by her mother. "Her unrequited love and ostracism from the family lead her to harness her extraordinary powers of imbuing her emotions to the food she makes. In turn, people who eat her food enact her emotions for her. For example, after eating a wedding cake Tita made while suffering from a forbidden love, the guests all suffer from a wave of longing. The Mexican author Juan Rulfo pioneered the exposition through a non-linear structure with his short novel Pedro Páramo that tells the story of Comala both as a lively town in times of the eponymous Pedro Páramo and as a ghost town through the eyes of his son Juan Preciado who returns to Comala to fulfil a promise to his dead mother.

In the Portuguese-speaking world, Jorge Amado and Nobel prize-winning novelist José Saramago are some of the most famous authors of magic realism. Less well-known figures may include Murilo Rubião, playwright Dias Gomes (Saramandaia), and José J. Veiga. Incidente em Antares, a novel by Erico Verrissimo, is also included, even though the author is not. Amado remains the best known of modern Brazilian writers, with his work having been translated into some 49 languages. He is the most adapted Brazilian author in cinema, theater, and television, notably Dona Flor and Her Two Husbands in 1976 and the American remake Kiss Me Goodbye in 1982. Angolan author Ondjaki's novel Transparent City is an example of magical realism in African literature. Transparent City won the José Saramago Prize in 2013.

In the English-speaking world, major authors include: British-Indian writer Salman Rushdie, whose Midnight's Children mixes history and fantasy; African American novelists Toni Morrison (although she has contested this descriptor of her work) and Gloria Naylor; American Latino writers such as Ana Castillo, Rudolfo Anaya, Daniel Olivas, Rudy Ruiz, and Helena Maria Viramontes; Guatemalan author Miguel Ángel Asturias; Native American authors Louise Erdrich and Sherman Alexie; English author Louis de Bernières; and English feminist writer Angela Carter. Perhaps the best known is Rushdie, whose "language form of magical realism straddles both the surrealist tradition of magic realism as it developed in Europe and the mythic tradition of magical realism as it developed in Latin America". Morrison's most notable work, Beloved, tells the story of a mother who, haunted by the ghost of her child, learns to cope with memories of her traumatic childhood as an abused slave and the burden of nurturing children into a harsh and brutal society. The Welsh author Glyn Jones's novel The Island of Apples (1965) is often overlooked, perhaps because it appeared before the term 'magic realism' was commonly known in English, perhaps because too much was made of the supposed influence of Jones's friend Dylan Thomas on his work, but this phantasmagorical blend of reality and myth with a twelve-year-old narrator set in a dreamlike version of the early 20th century clearly merits inclusion in the genre. Jonathan Safran Foer uses magical realism in exploring the history of the stetl and Holocaust in Everything Is Illuminated. The South African-Italian author Patricia Schonstein uses magic realism in examining the Holocaust, the Rhodesian War and apartheid in A Time of Angels and A Quilt of Dreams.

Dino Buzzati's novels and short stories are often cited as examples of magic realism in Italian literature.

In Norway, the writers Erik Fosnes Hansen, Jan Kjærstad and the young novelist Rune Salvesen have marked themselves as premier writers of magical realism, something that has been seen as very un-Norwegian.

In Kannada literature, Shivaram Karanth's Jnanpith award winning novel Mookajjiya Kanasugalu and Devanur Mahadeva's Kendra Sahitya Akademi award winning novel Kusuma Baale are two prominent works that dabbled in magical realism. Both the works are widely read and have been adapted into a movie and a limited TV series, respectively. Mookajjiya Kanasugalu is a novel that traces the evolution of 'gods' in a grounded setting via Mookajji's (the main character) preternatural ability to touch and see everything an inanimate object has witnessed in its entire existence. The novel Kusuma Baale blends magical realism and surrealism while telling the story of lives of people from the oppressed castes in rural parts of Karnataka.

During the dissolution of Soviet Union, Eastern Bloc magical realism saw prominence, with the forefront authors being Viktor Pelevin, Ludmila Petrushevskaya, Tatyana Tolstaya and Ludmila Ulitskaya. Other influential works from this era included The Soul of the Patriot (1989) by Yevgeni Anatolyevich Popov, Russian Beauty (1990) by Viktor Yerofeyev, The Manhole (1991) by Vladimir Makanin. Dmitri Lipskerov and his 1997 novel Forty years in Chanchzhoe even showcased an embrace of elements of Latin American magical realism through its influence from One Hundred Years of Solitude.

Dimitris Lyacos's Poena Damni trilogy, originally written in Greek, is also seen as displaying characteristics of magic realism in its simultaneous fusion of real and unreal situations in the same narrative context.

== Visual art ==
=== Historical development ===
Giorgio de Chirico, Love Song, 1914, Museum of Modern Art, New York

The painterly style began evolving as early as the first decade of the 20th century, but 1925 was when Magischer Realismus and Neue Sachlichkeit were officially recognized as major trends. This was the year that Franz Roh published his book on the subject, Nach-Expressionismus, Magischer Realismus: Probleme der neuesten europäischen Malerei (Post-Expressionism, Magical Realism: Problems of the Newest European Painting) and Gustav Hartlaub curated the seminal exhibition on the theme, entitled simply Neue Sachlichkeit (translated as New Objectivity), at the Kunsthalle Mannheim in Mannheim, Germany. Guenther refers most frequently to the New Objectivity, rather than magical realism, which is attributed to that New objectivity is practical based, referential (to real practicing artists), while the magical realism is theoretical or critic's rhetoric. Eventually under Massimo Bontempelli guidance, the term 'magic realism' was fully embraced by the German as well as in Italian practicing communities.

New Objectivity saw an utter rejection of the preceding impressionist and expressionist movements, and Hartlaub curated his exhibition under the guideline: only those "who have remained true or have returned to a positive, palpable reality in order to reveal the truth of the times" would be included. The style was roughly divided into two subcategories: conservative, (neo-)classicist painting, and generally left-wing, politically motivated Verists. The following quote by Hartlaub distinguishes the two, though mostly with reference to Germany; however, one might apply the logic to all relevant European countries.

In the new art, he saw a right, a left wing. One, conservative towards Classicism, taking roots in timelessness, wanting to sanctify again the healthy, physically plastic in pure drawing after nature ... after so much eccentricity and chaos [a reference to the repercussions of World War I] ... The other, the left, glaringly contemporary, far less artistically faithful, rather born of the negation of art, seeking to expose the chaos, the true face of our time, with an addiction to primitive fact-finding and nervous baring of the self ... There is nothing left but to affirm it [the new art], especially since it seems strong enough to raise new artistic willpower.

Both sides were seen all over Europe during the 1920s and 1930s, ranging from the Netherlands to Austria, France to Russia, with Germany and Italy as centers of growth. Indeed, Italian Giorgio de Chirico, producing works in the late 1910s under the style arte metafisica (translated as Metaphysical art), is seen as a precursor and as having an "influence ... greater than any other painter on the artists of New Objectivity."

Further afield, American painters were later (in the 1940s and 1950s, mostly) coined magical realists; a link between these artists and the Neue Sachlichkeit of the 1920s was explicitly made in the New York Museum of Modern Art exhibition, tellingly titled "American Realists and Magic Realists". French magical realist Pierre Roy, who worked and showed successfully in the US, is cited as having "helped spread Franz Roh's formulations" to the United States.

=== Excluding the overtly fantastic ===
When art critic Franz Roh applied the term magic realism to visual art in 1925, he was designating a style of visual art that brings extreme realism to the depiction of mundane subject matter, revealing an "interior" mystery, rather than imposing external, overtly magical features onto this everyday reality. Roh explains:

We are offered a new style that is thoroughly of this world that celebrates the mundane. This new world of objects is still alien to the current idea of Realism. It employs various techniques that endow all things with a deeper meaning and reveal mysteries that always threaten the secure tranquility of simple and ingenuous things ... it is a question of representing before our eyes, in an intuitive way, the fact, the interior figure, of the exterior world.

In painting, 'magical realism' is a term often interchanged with post-expressionism, as Ríos also shows, for the very title of Roh's 1925 essay was "Post-Expressionism, Magical Realism". Indeed, as Lois Parkinson Zamora of the University of Houston writes, "Roh, in his 1925 essay, described a group of painters whom we now categorize generally as Post-Expressionists."

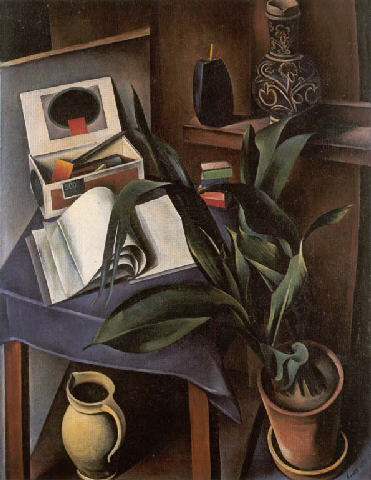
Alexander Kanoldt, Still Life II 1922

Roh used this term to describe painting that signaled a return to realism after expressionism's extravagances, which sought to redesign objects to reveal the spirits of those objects. Magical realism, according to Roh, instead faithfully portrays the exterior of an object, and in doing so the spirit, or magic, of the object reveals itself. One could relate this exterior magic all the way back to the 15th century. Flemish painter Van Eyck (1395–1441) highlights the complexity of a natural landscape by creating illusions of continuous and unseen areas that recede into the background, leaving it to the viewer's imagination to fill in those gaps in the image: for instance, in a rolling landscape with river and hills. The magic is contained in the viewer's interpretation of those mysterious unseen or hidden parts of the image. Other important aspects of magical realist painting, according to Roh, include:

- A return to ordinary subjects as opposed to fantastical ones.
- A juxtaposition of forward movement with a sense of distance, as opposed to Expressionism's tendency to foreshorten the subject.
- A use of miniature details even in expansive paintings, such as large landscapes.

The pictorial ideals of Roh's original magic realism attracted new generations of artists through the latter years of the 20th century and beyond. In a 1991 New York Times review, critic Vivien Raynor remarked that "John Stuart Ingle proves that Magic Realism lives" in his "virtuoso" still life watercolors. Ingle's approach, as described in his own words, reflects the early inspiration of the magic realism movement as described by Roh; that is, the aim is not to add magical elements to a realistic painting, but to pursue a radically faithful rendering of reality; the "magic" effect on the viewer comes from the intensity of that effort: "I don't want to make arbitrary changes in what I see to paint the picture, I want to paint what is given. The whole idea is to take something that's given and explore that reality as intensely as I can."

=== Later development: incorporating the fantastic ===
Paul Cadmus, The Fleet's In! 1934

While Ingle represents a "magic realism" that harks back to Roh's ideas, the term "magic realism" in mid-20th century visual art tends to refer to work that incorporates overtly fantastic elements, somewhat in the manner of its literary counterpart.

Occupying an intermediate place in this line of development, the work of several European and American painters whose most important work dates from the 1930s through to the 1950s, including Bettina Shaw-Lawrence, Paul Cadmus, Ivan Albright, Philip Evergood, George Tooker, Brian Connelly, Ricco, even Andrew Wyeth, such as in his well-known work Christina's World, is designated as "magic realist". This work departs sharply from Roh's definition, in that it (according to Artcyclopedia) "is anchored in everyday reality, but has overtones of fantasy or wonder". In the work of Cadmus, for example, the surreal atmosphere is sometimes achieved via stylized distortions or exaggerations that are not realistic.

Recent "magic realism" has gone beyond mere "overtones" of the fantastic or surreal to depict a frankly magical reality, with an increasingly tenuous anchoring in "everyday reality". Artists associated with this kind of magic realism include Marcela Donoso and Gregory Gillespie.

Artists such as Peter Doig, Richard T. Scott and Will Teather have become associated with the term in the early 21st century.

=== Painters ===
- Alex And
- Colleen Browning
- Paul Cadmus
- Felice Casorati
- Alex Colville
- Brian Connelly
- John Rogers Cox
- Cagnaccio di San Pietro
- Antonio Donghi
- Marcela Donoso
- Eyvind Earle
- Jared French
- H. R. Giger
- Rob Gonsalves
- Juan Gonzalez
- Edward Hopper
- Carroll N. Jones III
- Frida Kahlo
- Gayane Khachaturian
- Henry Koerner
- Simphiwe Ndzube
- Michael Parkes
- Charles Rain
- Mohammad Rawas
- Ricco
- Priscilla Roberts
- Deirdre Sullivan Beeman
- George Tooker
- Ramon Unzueta
- Jan Verdoodt
- Carel Willink
- Nicholas Zalevsky

== Film and television ==
Magical realism is not a clearly defined film genre, but characteristics of magical realism present in literature can also be found in many moving pictures with fantasy elements. These characteristics may be presented matter-of-factly and occur without explanation.

Many films have magical realist narrative and events that contrast between real and magical elements, or different modes of production. This device explores the reality of what exists. Fredric Jameson, in On Magic Realism in Film, advances a hypothesis that magical realism in film is a formal mode that is constitutionally dependent on a type of historical raw material in which disjunction is structurally present. Like Water for Chocolate (1992) begins and ends with the first person narrative to establish the magical realism storytelling frame. Telling a story from a child's point of view, the historical gaps and holes perspective, and with cinematic color heightening the presence, are magical realist tools in films.

A number of films by Woody Allen, including Midnight in Paris (2011), feature magical realist elements. Most of the films directed by Terry Gilliam are strongly influenced by magic realism; the animated films of Satoshi Kon and Hayao Miyazaki often utilize magic realism; and some of the films of Emir Kusturica contain elements of magical realism, the most notable of which is Time of the Gypsies (1988).

Some other films and television shows that convey elements of magical realism include:

- The Holy Mountain (1973)
- Big (1988)
- Field of Dreams (1989)
- Dreams (1990)
- Edward Scissorhands (1990)
- Twin Peaks (1990)
- Liar Liar (1997)
- Perfect Blue (1997)
- The Green Mile (1999)
- Being John Malkovich (1999)
- Hearts in Atlantis (2001)
- Amélie (2001)
- Millennium Actress (2001)
- Waking Life (2001)
- Big Fish (2003)
- Wonderfalls (2004)
- The Mistress of Spices (2005)
- Pan's Labyrinth (2006)
- Paprika (2006)
- The Fountain (2006)
- John from Cincinnati (2007)
- Marigold (2007)
- The Curious Case of Benjamin Button (2008)
- Skellig (2009)
- Undertow (2009)
- Biutiful (2010)
- Black Swan (2010)
- Uncle Boonmee Who Can Recall His Past Lives (2010)
- Once Upon a Time (2011–2018)
- The Tree of Life (2011)
- The Skin I Live In (2011)
- Beasts of the Southern Wild (2012)
- Life of Pi (2012)
- Moonrise Kingdom (2012)
- Wolf Children (2012)
- The Dance of Reality (2013)
- Birdman (2014)
- The Prophet (2014)
- The Age of Adaline (2015)
- Utopians (2015)
- Endless Poetry (2016)
- Swiss Army Man (2016)
- The Killing of a Sacred Deer (2017)
- Thirty Years of Adonis (2017)
- Tigers Are Not Afraid (2017)
- The Shape of Water (2017)
- Border (2018)
- Undone (2019)
- Wendy (2020)
- Dick Johnson Is Dead (2020)
- I'm Thinking of Ending Things (2020)
- Supercool (2021)
- The Underground Railroad (2021)
- Where Is Anne Frank (2021)
- Memoria (2021)
- Reservation Dogs (2021)
- Encanto (2021)
- Three Thousand Years of Longing (2022)
- Rainbow (2022)
- Bardo, False Chronicle of a Handful of Truths (2022)
- All We Imagine as Light (2024)
- Ghost Cat Anzu (2024)
- Megalopolis (2024)
- The Life of Chuck (2025)
- Small Prophets (2026)

== Video games and new media ==
In his essay "Half-Real", MIT professor and ludologist Jesper Juul argues that the intrinsic nature of video games is magic realist. Early video games such as the 1986 text adventure Trinity combined elements of science fiction, fantasy and magic realism. Point-and-click adventure games such as Kentucky Route Zero (2013) and Memoranda (2017) have also embraced the genre. The Metal Gear franchise has also frequently been cited as a notable example of magic realism, because of its combination of realistic military fiction with supernatural elements.

In electronic literature, early author Michael Joyce's afternoon, a story deploys the ambiguity and dubious narrator characteristic of high modernism, along with some suspense and romance elements, in a story whose meaning could change dramatically depending on the path taken through its lexias on each reading.

== See also ==
- Central conceit – Underlying fictitious assumption of a work of fiction
- List of genres

With reference to literature

- Escapist fiction – Genre of fiction
- Fantasy – Literary genre
- Latin American Boom – Late 20th-century literary movement
- Hallucinatory realism – Term used by critics in describing works of art
- Hysterical realism – Term to describe certain realist-genre books
- Low fantasy – Subgenre of fantasy fiction defined by a "mundane" setting
- McOndo – Latin American literary movement
- Southern Gothic – Subgenre of Gothic fiction

With reference to visual art

- Fantastic realism – 20th century group of artists
- Irrealism (the arts)
- Metaphysical art – Italian art style
- New Objectivity – 1920s German art movement against expressionism
- Visionary art – Art that purports to transcend the physical world

With reference to both

- Art film – Film genre
- Escapism – Mental diversion from unpleasant or boring aspects of life
- Dream art – Art based on dreams or meant to resemble dreams
- Imagination – Creative ability
- Metarealism – Direction in Russian poetry and art
- Postmodernism – Artistic, cultural, and theoretical movement
- Romantic realism – Art combining romanticism and realism
- Surrealism – International cultural movement (1920s–1950s)
- Utopia – Imaginary community with desirable qualities

== Relevant literature ==
- Frans Roh. Nach-Expressionismus – Magischer Realismus: Probleme der neuesten europäischen Malerei. Leipzig: Klinkhardt & Biermann, 1925.
- Wieland Schmied. Neue Sachlichkeit und Magischer Realismus in Deutschland 1918-1933. Hannover: Fackelträger-Verlag Schmidt-Küster, 1969.
- Lois Parkinson Zamora and Wendy B. Faris, eds. Magical Realism: Theory, History, Community. Durham, NC: Duke University Press, 1995.
- Seymour Menton. Magic Realism Rediscovered, 1918–1981. The Art Alliance Press, 1983.
- Gintsburg, Sarali, and Kenneth Usongo, eds. Magical Realism in Africa: Literary and Dramatic Explorations. Taylor & Francis, 2024.
- Stephanie Lebas Huber. Dutch Neorealism, Cinema, and the Politics of Painting, 1927–1945. Taylor & Francis, 2025.
