= Evansville Museum of Arts, History and Science =

Museum in the United States

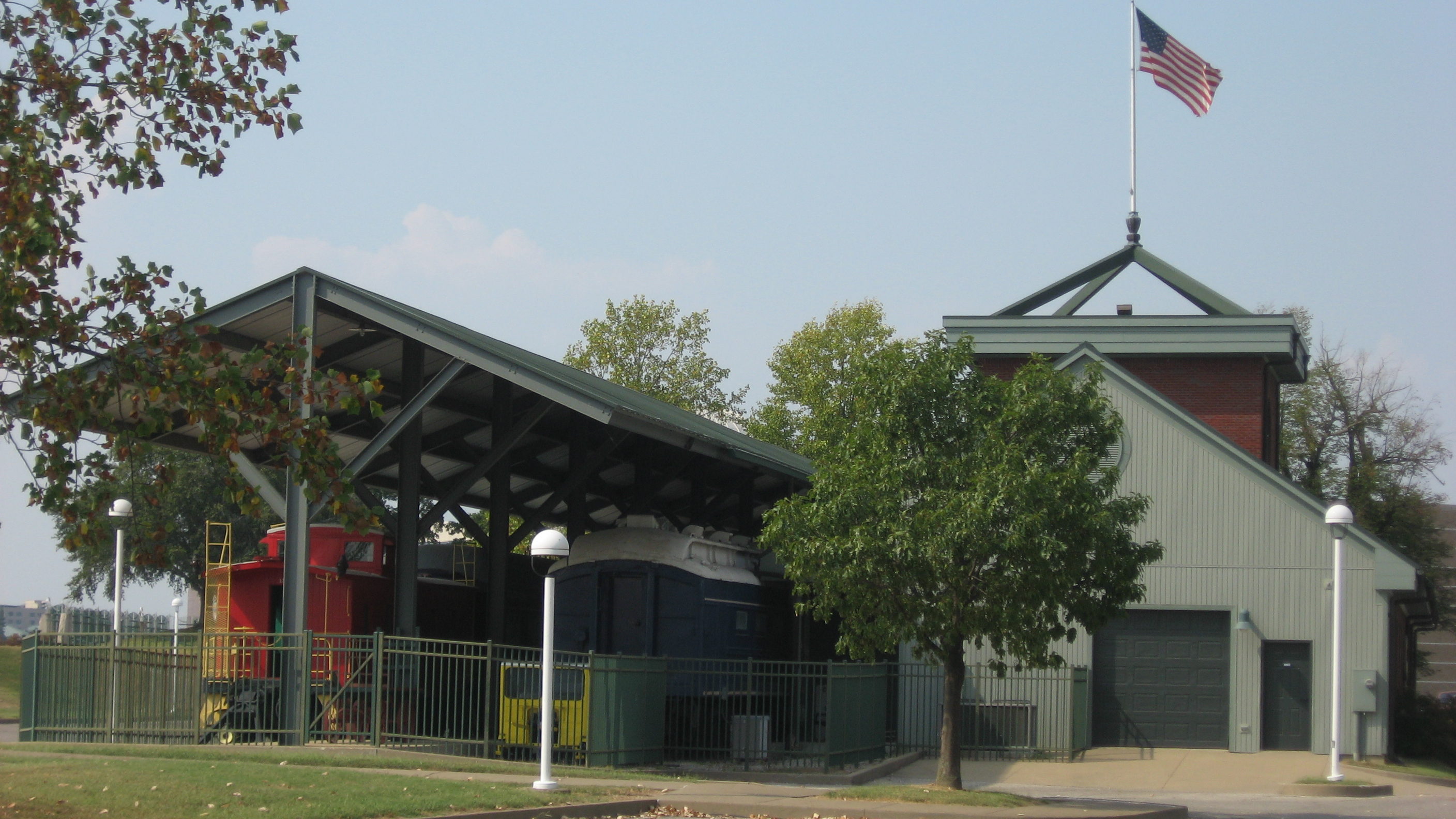
- Transportation Center of the Evansville Museum of Arts, History and Science
- Established: 1904
- Location: 411 S.E. Riverside Drive; Evansville, Indiana
- Coordinates: 37.96513°N 87.57320°W
- Type: General interest
- Public transit access: METS
- Website: emuseum.org

The Evansville Museum of Arts, History & Science is a general-interest museum located on the Ohio riverfront in downtown Evansville, Indiana, United States. Founded in 1904, it is one of Southern Indiana's most established and significant cultural institutions, with comprehensive collections in art, history, anthropology and science. It has a permanent collection of over 30,000 objects including fine arts, decorative arts, historic documents and photographs, and anthropologic and natural history artifacts. Also on the museum's campus is the Evansville Museum Transportation Center, featuring Southern Indiana transportation artifacts from the late 19th through the mid-20th centuries. The museum is accredited by the American Alliance of Museums.

== History of the Museum ==
The story of the Evansville Museum began in 1874 when the Ladies’ Literary Club was founded. The members of the club were invested in studying art, history, and literature, and they were passionate about encouraging the study of art in Evansville. Initially, they obtained one exhibition that was housed in the Willard Library. After the success of the exhibition, they obtained more exhibitions and artifacts and were then in need of a museum building.

The first building selected for the museum was the historic Barnes-Armstrong Mansion at the foot of Cherry Street in Sunset Park. However, in 1910 a controversial decision was made to demolish the Mansion for safety reasons, and the museum's artifacts were temporarily placed in the Old Court House. Although many artifacts were lost or destroyed in the move, the museum was reopened in 1928 in the old YWCA building under the name Temple of Fine Arts and History. It was meant to be a sanctuary of art for the Evansville community.

In 1938 there were efforts to move the museum to a new building. However, it was not until the 1950s when Siegfried R. Weng became the director of the museum that the dream of a new structure was finally fulfilled. The museum resides in that building today, although it underwent an extensive expansion and renovation and reopened in 2014.

== Expansion ==
In 2008 the museum announced a three-year expansion and renovation plan. In October 2012 the plan was modified to include a glass walled, rectangular addition with a domed immersive planetarium and theater. The domed theater is entirely inside the building box, visible from the exterior. A pedestrian-friendly plaza and new museum entrance connects the addition to parking and the Evansville Museum Transportation Center. The expansion, which began with repairs, renovations and additions to its existing building was completed at a cost of $14.1 million. The museum re-opened its doors to the public on February 7, 2014. A key piece of the project, the new Koch Immersive Theater features a 40-foot diameter domed screen with a 360 degree digital projection.

== Overview of the Museum Today ==
Permanent exhibit galleries include learning spaces devoted to art, history, anthropology and participatory science. Artworks from the 16th century to the present are in the museum's permanent galleries.

The museum offers changing history and science exhibitions in its Center for History and Science and changing art exhibitions throughout the year. An area for families offers participatory exhibits and programs to inspire and instruct students of all ages. Interesting and informative science demonstrations are performed by student volunteers most weekend afternoons. The Koch Immersive Theater & Planetarium houses a 40-foot diameter domed screen with 360-degree digital projection. Programming for the theater includes traditional astronomy programs and giant screen, immersive films that span a range of topics heavily weighted toward space and astronomy. More information and show times can be found at http://emuseum.org.

The Evansville Museum Transportation Center traces the history of transportation and features the Milwaukee Road 1416 steam locomotive. The transportation center also includes a L&N Tennessee Club Car and a caboose. The locomotive is a 1908 Milwaukee Road 0-6-0 I-5 switcher steam engine, believed to be the last of its kind.

The museum has produced notable solo exhibitions of artists such as John Stuart Ingle, Don Gummer, and Theodore Clement Steele, sometimes in collaboration with other institutions, including the Wadsworth Atheneum, the Butler Institute of American Art, and the Indiana State Museum.

== Arts ==
The Evansville Museum's permanent art collection of American and European works dating from the 16th through the 20th centuries is exhibited in the Crescent Galleries which highlight the themes of landscape, still life, genre works, and portraiture.

The Old Gallery, the John Streetman Alcove, and the Main Gallery feature temporary exhibitions of touring collections, exhibitions from the museum's own collections, and the work of regional artists.

=== Picasso's Seated Woman with Red Hat ===
The museum's best-known artwork is Seated Woman with Red Hat (Femme assise au chapeau rouge), a work in glass by Pablo Picasso created in the mid-1950s at the Malherbe studio in France. It was made using gemmail, a technique in which small shards of colored glass are layered, fused together with a clear adhesive, and fired. The 36-by-28-inch work depicts Marie-Thérèse Walter, Picasso's model and partner from 1927 to about 1935, and is based on an oil portrait of her that Picasso completed in 1934. Between 1954 and 1956 Picasso created about 50 gemmaux with the Malherbe glass artists, giving half of them to the Malherbe family and keeping half, which were later sold to private collectors.

Industrial designer Raymond Loewy purchased the Evansville work in the 1950s and donated it to the museum in 1963. The paperwork accompanying the gift identified the artist as "Gemmaux", the plural name of the technique, so the piece was catalogued as a design after Picasso and placed in storage, where it remained undisplayed for nearly 50 years. In February 2012, Guernsey's auction house, while researching Picasso's gemmail works, traced the piece to Evansville, and it was identified as an original Picasso.

Concerned about the cost of insuring and securing a work of such value, the museum's trustees voted in August 2012 to sell it through a private sale arranged by Guernsey's, whose president suggested it could bring $30 million to $40 million. The sale was never completed, and the work remained in storage for another decade. In March 2024 the Indiana Destination Development Corporation awarded the museum a $52,658 grant toward renovating the Koch Foundation Gallery to display the work, and Seated Woman with Red Hat was unveiled to the public on June 26, 2024, as the centerpiece of the renovated gallery. It is displayed alongside other Picasso works in the museum's permanent collection, including several prints and a ceramic piece.

== History ==
There are also galleries dedicated to early Evansville history, Abraham Lincoln, and the home front effort during WWII.

The Humankind Gallery offers a look at world cultures with an emphasis on North and South America, Africa, and Asia.

== Science ==
The Welborn Baptist Foundation Family Place is a hands-on science gallery for families. Family Place is also the new home for the museum's Alaskan Kodiak Brown Bear, named Kodi, and an interactive science demonstration area.

The Evansville Convention and Visitors Bureau Center for History and Science gallery offers changing science and history exhibitions.

== Koch Immersive Theater ==
The theater utilizes a 40-foot diameter domed screen and features astronomy and science programming.

== EMTRAC ==
The exhibitions of the Evansville Museum Transportation Center, EMTRAC, interpret transportation in Southern Indiana from the latter part of the 19th century through the mid-20th century. Included in the exhibitions are a historic three-car train; a 1910 Sears Motor Car; and the intricate model railroad Charlotte's Evansville.

== See also ==
- Frederick Carder
- Jane Frank
- William Gropper
- Jerry Wilkerson

== Bibliography ==
- John Camp; John Stuart Ingle; Evansville Museum of Arts and Science; Wadsworth Atheneum. The eye and the heart : watercolors of John Stuart Ingle (New York : Rizzoli; Evansville, Ind. : Evansville Museum of Arts & Science, 1988) (Worldcat link: ) ISBN 0-8478-0888-2; ISBN 978-0-8478-0888-5
- Don Gummer; Peter Plagens; Evansville Museum of Arts, History and Science.; Butler Institute of American Art.; Indiana State Museum. The lyrical constructivist : Don Gummer sculpture (Chesterfield, Mass. : Chameleon Books; Evansville, Ind. : Evansville Museum of Arts, History & Science, 2001) (Worldcat link: ) ISBN 0-915829-70-3; ISBN 978-0-915829-70-5; ISBN 978-0-915829-70-5
- William H Gerdts; T. C. Steele; Evansville Museum of Arts and Science; Valparaiso University Museum of Art. Theodore Clement Steele, an American master of light (New York, N.Y. : Chameleon Books, 1995) (Worldcat link:) OCLC 33132008

NB: Some WorldCat listings and other sources refer to this museum as the "Evansville Museum of Arts and Science". It is also commonly called the "Evansville Museum".
