= Marcela Donoso =

- Born: Marcela Andrea Donoso Concha; 16 February 1961; Concepcion, ChileConcepción, Chile
- Died: Living
- Education: University of Chile, School of Art
- Known for: Painter
- Notable work: Iconography of Myths and Legends of Chile, 2002
- Movement: Magical realism

Marcela Donoso Concha (Santiago, Chile; 16 February 1961) is a Chilean painter, belonging to the Magical Realism movement.

== Biography ==
Marcela Donoso was born 16 February 1961, in Santiago, Chile, and is a Chilean. She spent part of her childhood in the United States and Venezuela, returning to Chile in 1970. Between the years 1972 and 1973, she attended the Concepción Steel Artists' Workshop. She studied at the University of Chile School of Art between 1984 and 1988, studying under Adolfo Couve. She ultimately received her degree in art with a specialization in painting and engraving. Donoso lived in Mozambique, Africa between 1989 and 1991, where she studied under the artist Malangatana Ngwenya. She also learned to speak Portuguese and created various works. Among the works created was an iron monument dedicated to the Heroes of Mozambican independence (1990), a mural at the Inhambane airport (1989), and a commemorative mural in a governmental building in the same city. She also participated in an art show for the Mozambique Association of Friendship and Solidarity with the People (AMASP) and a UNICEF Artistic Development Project for child war victims. At the same time, she worked for the organization Handicap International.

She returned to Chile and won the Palestinian Women's Union prize in 1992. Her work for that competition was acquired by the Banco Osorno (Bank of Osorno).

In 1999, she conducted a series of open workshops in the Sala 508 South in Brasilia, Brazil, under the auspices of the Chilean Embassy.

In July 1998 the itinerant exhibition Iconography of Myths and Legends of Chile was inaugurated at the Montecarmelo Cultural Center, which was also presented at the Cultural Center of Puente Alto and at the University of Concepción. Under the patronage of the Ministry of Foreign Affairs in 1999, this same work was exhibited at the Centro Cultural 508 in Brasilia and at the Latin American Memorial in São Paulo, Brazil. Both individual samples. Among the group presentations in Brazil are the Latin American Painting Exhibition at the Latin American Memorial, sponsored by the Consulate of Chile in 2000 and Latin American Religious Art, with part of the work Patronos de Chile and Some Spells at the Academy of Art and Culture of Brazil in March 2001. In the year 2002 publishes the book Iconography of Myths and Legends of America. In April 2010 the exhibition Iconography of Myths and Legends of America was inaugurated in the UDLA, this same work was presented in September of the same year in the Palace of Courts of Justice as Bicentennial Exposition of the Supreme Court of Chile.

== Works ==
- Serie "Iconografía de Mitos y Leyendas de Chile"
- Serie "Patronos de Chile y otros conjuros"
- película, "El Caleuche"

== Books ==
- Iconografía de Mitos y Leyendas de Chile, 2002, ISBN 956-291-592-1
- Pablo, 2008, ISBN 1-933032-09-X

== Exhibitions ==
- Universidad de Concepcíón, Chillán, Chile, 1998
- Centro Cultural Montecarmelo, Santiago, Chile, 1998
- Centro Cultural Puente Alto, Chile, 1999
- Centro cultural 508, Brasilia, Brasil, 1999
- Memorial de América Latina, Sao Pablo, Brasil, 1999
