= Alex And =

Ukrainian artist

And Alex
- Born: 1962 (age 62–63); Kyiv, Ukrainian Soviet Socialist Republic
- Known for: Painting
- Style: Magic realism, Fantastic art

Alex And (Alexey D. Andreev Ukrainian: Анд Олексій Дмитрович, Russian: Анд Алексей Дмитриевич) is a Ukrainian artist of Magic realism, Fantastic art, Visionary art, applied to contemporary art.
He was included into list of top-20 painters of Ukraine. In 1996 Alex And became winner from popular artist of the first L1 auction of contemporary Ukrainian arts (National Art Museum of Ukraine, Kyiv). At present time he lives and works in Kyiv, Ukraine.

In Russian "United Artists Rating" (issue XVII, 2010), Alex And is registered under the art-category 5B like a formed professional artist.
And's works are in the public collections of the National Reserve Bank of Ukraine; of the Foundation "Ukrainian Renaissance" (Kyiv); at the Museum of the Central Archives of the Ministry of Defense (Podolsk, Russia); in galleries and private collections in Ukraine, Russia, Western Europe and America.

== Biography ==
Alex And was born in 1962 in Kyiv, Ukrainian Soviet Socialist Republic. In 1980, he graduated from the Republican Art School, Kyiv, Ukraine, and then, in 1988, the Kyiv State Art Institute (now - The National Academy of Fine Arts and Architecture). His teachers in the specialty were: Members of the Ukrainian Art Academy, Chekanyuk V.A., Storozhenko N.A., and Professor Kozhekov A. Since 1994, he has been a member of the National Union of Artists of Ukraine. He works in the "associative symbolism" style. The term implies a certain suggestiveness. It was believed that when an object loses otherworldly mysticism, there is only associative symbolism. It term used in poetry, literature, and the visual arts.

== Selected works ==
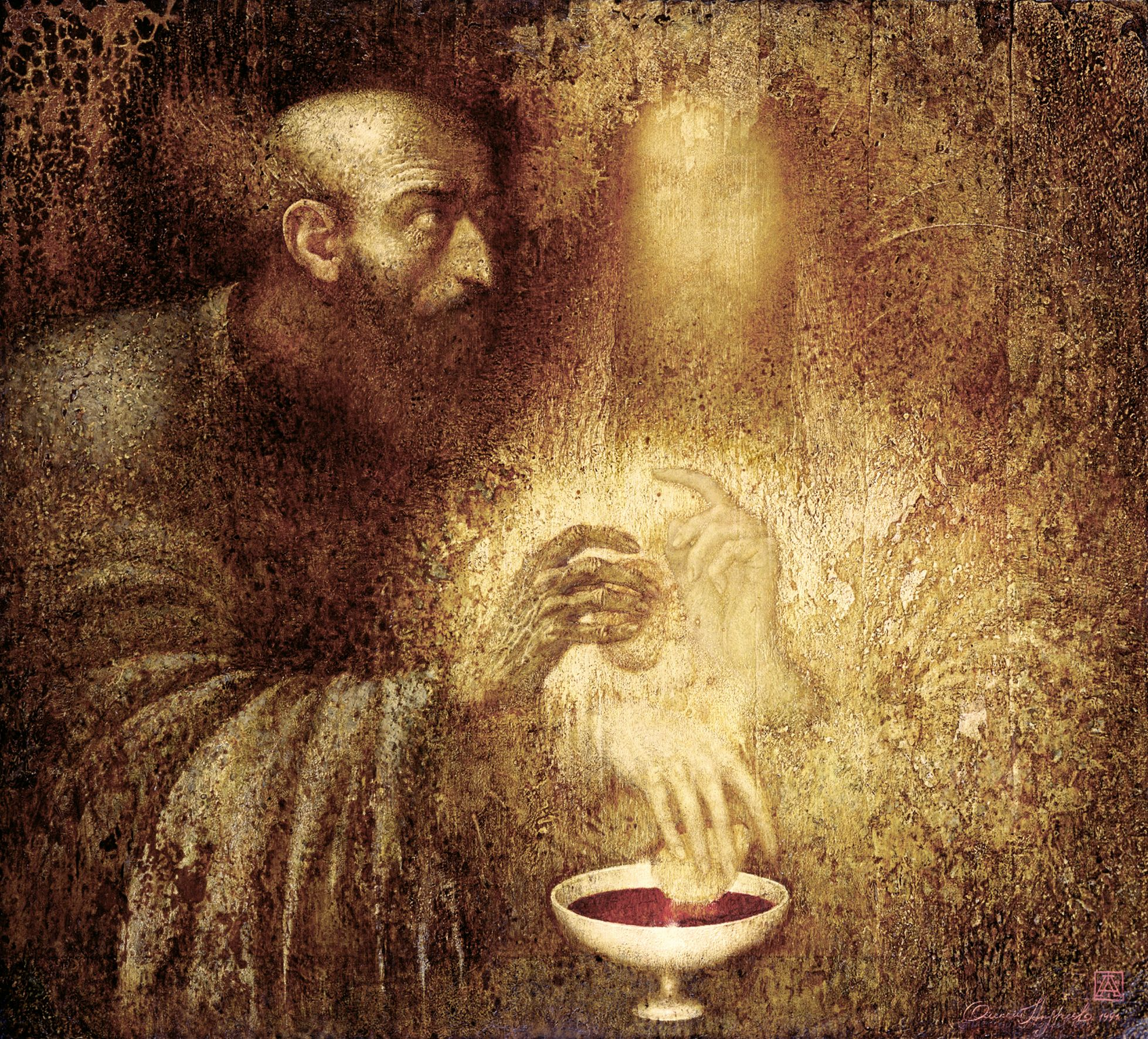
Fatality, 1991

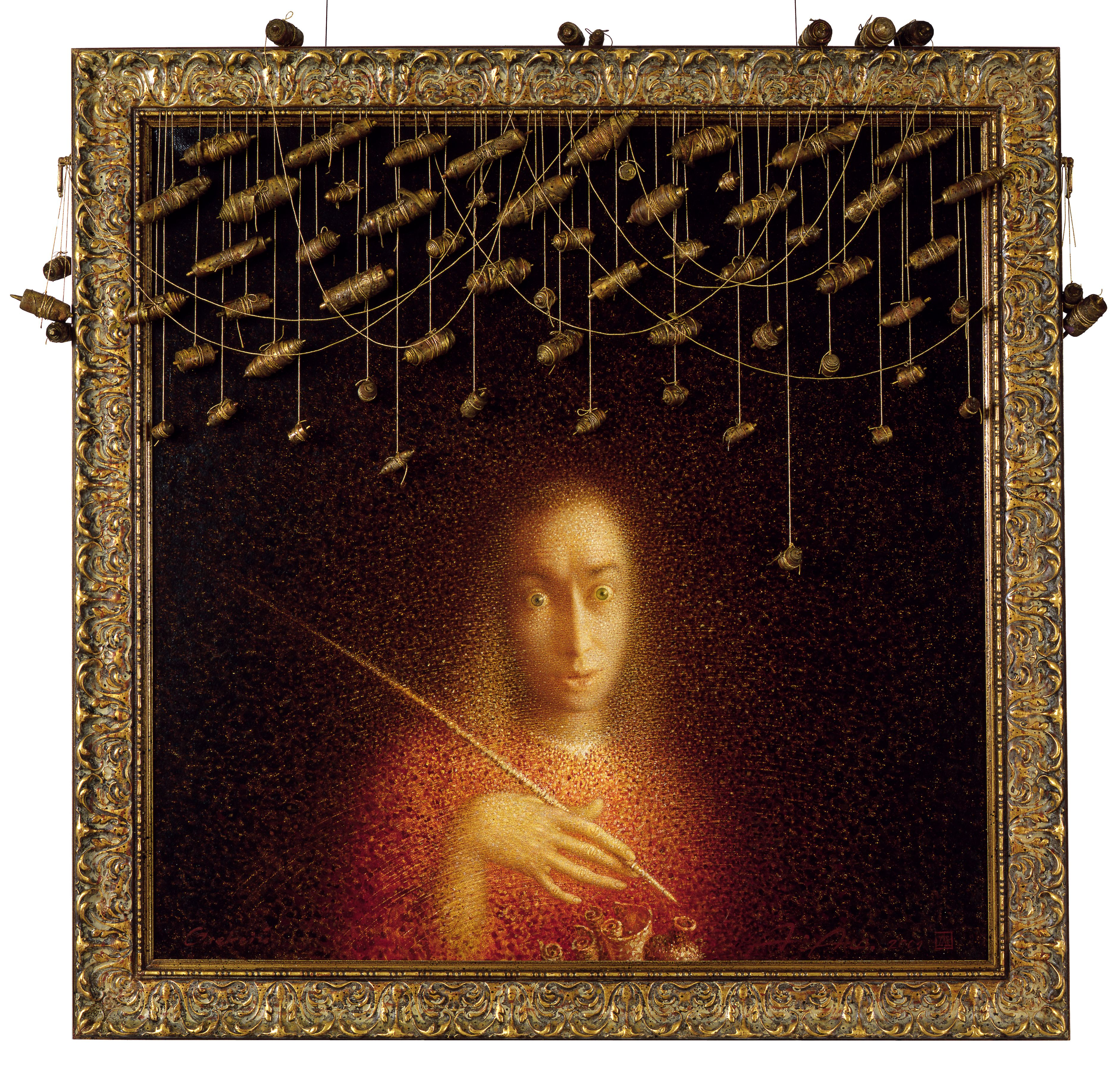
In search of relationship, 2002

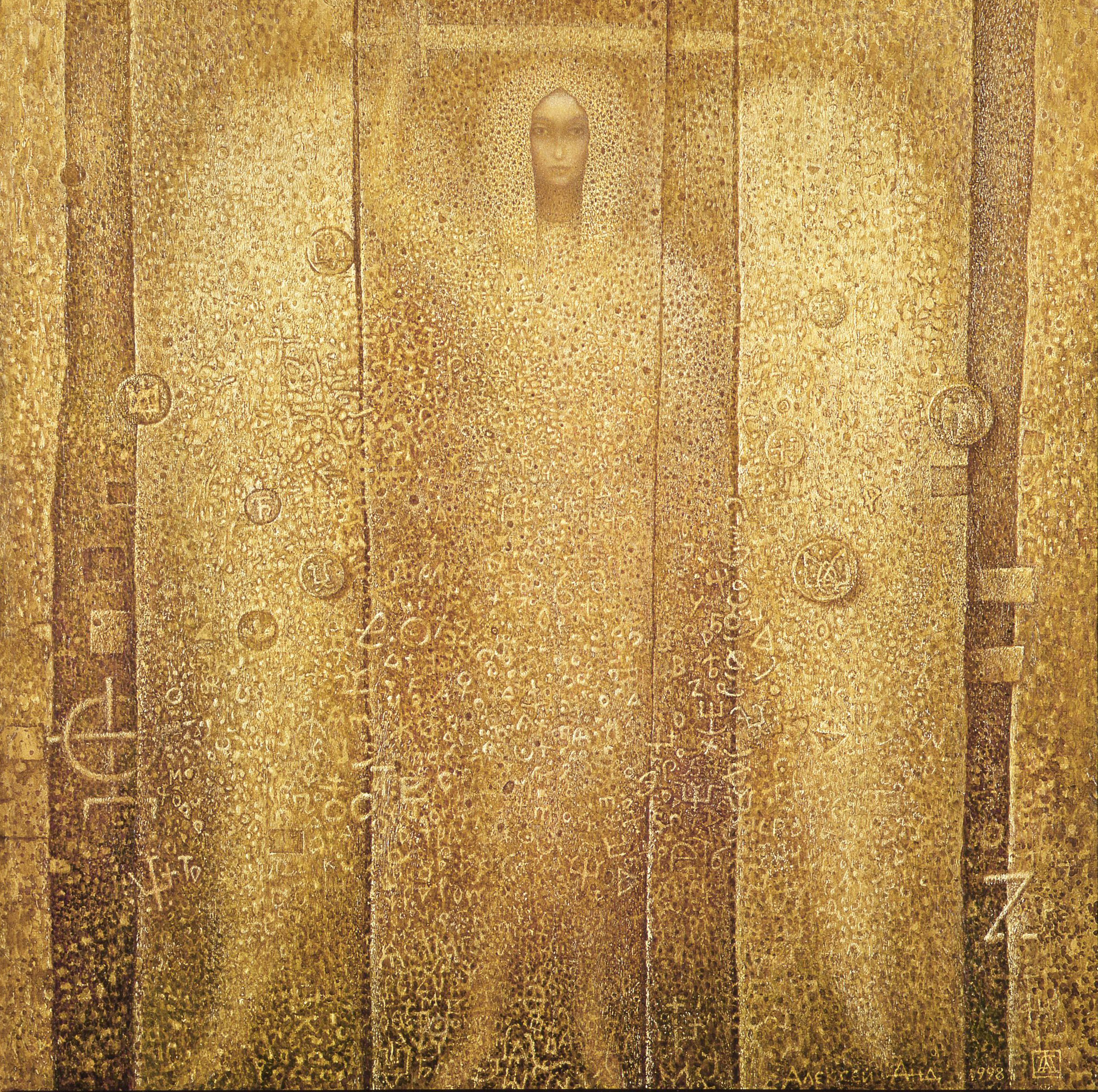
Symbols Guardian, 1998

== Exhibitions and Festivals ==
- 1988 “All-Union Exhibition on the Competition for the Golden Medal of the USSR Academy of Arts”, USSR Academy of Arts, Leningrad, Russian Soviet Federative Socialist Republic.
- 1988 All-Ukrainian Exhibition of Fine Art, Central House of Artist NSHU, Kyiv, Ukrainian Soviet Socialist Republic.
- 1989 “All-Union Exhibition of Fine Art”, Minsk, Byelorussian Soviet Socialist Republic.
- 1989 All-Ukrainian Exhibition of Fine Art, Central House of Artist NSHU, Kyiv, Ukrainian Soviet Socialist Republic.
- 1990 “Creations by Contemporary Ukrainian Artists”, Chicago, US.
- 1991 “Contemporary Ukrainian Fine Art”, Chicago, US.
- 1990 All-Ukrainian Exhibition of Fine Art, Central House of Artist NSHU, Kyiv, Ukrainian Soviet Socialist Republic.
- 1991 International Bienalle of Fine Art “Vidrojennya”, Lviv, Ukraine.
- 1991 International Bienalle of Fine Art “IMPREZA-1”, Ivano-Frankivsk, Ukraine. (catalogue)
- 1991 All-Ukrainian Exhibition of Fine Art, Central House of Artist NSHU, Kyiv, Ukraine.
- 1992 “Creations by Contemporary Ukraine Artists”, Chicago, US.
- 1992 All-Ukrainian Exhibition of Fine Art, Central House of Artist NSHU, Kyiv, Ukraine.
- 1993 “Contemporary Ukrainian Fine Art”, Chicago, US.
- 1993 “Contemporary Ukraine Art”, Munich, Berlin, Nuremberg, Germany.
- 1993 “SAMFO-ART” NSHU Gallery “The artist”, Kyiv. (A booklet).
- 1993 International Bienalle of Fine Art “IMPREZA-2”. Ivano-Frankivsk, Ukraine. (catalogue).
- 1993 All-Ukrainian Exhibition of Fine Art, Central House of Artist NSHU, Kyiv, Ukraine.
- 1994 Winner of the Competition “Best Artistic Creations of the Year”, National Taras Shevchenko Museum, Kyiv.
- 1994 “Contemporary Ukrainian Fine Art”, Chicago, US.
- 1994 International Art-Fair, National Art Palace “Ukrainian House”, Kyiv, Ukraine. (catalogue).
- 1994 All-Ukrainian Exhibition of Fine Art, Central House of Artist NSHU, Kyiv, Ukraine.
- 1995 “Contemporary Ukraine Art”, Chicago, US.
- 1995 “Creations of Ukraine Artists”, London, Great Britain.
- 1995 “Ukraine Fine Art” in UN representative office in Ukraine, Kyiv. Ukraine.
- 1995 International Bienalle of Fine Art “PAN UKRAINE”, Dnipropetrovsk, Ukraine. (catalogue)
- 1995 All-Ukrainian Exhibition of Fine Art, Central House of Artist NSHU, Kyiv, Ukraine.
- 1996 “Contemporary Ukraine Fine Art”, Chicago, US.
- 1996 Auction of contemporary Ukrainian paintings "L1", National Ukraine Art Museum, Kyiv, Ukraine.
- 1996 All-Ukrainian Exhibition of Fine Art, Central House of Artist NSHU, Kyiv, Ukraine.
- 1996 International Art-Festival, National Art Palace 'Ukrainian House', Kyiv, Ukraine. (catalogue)
- 1996 Author's Project “Submersion into the Unconscious”. National Historico-cultural Monument "Kyiv-Pechersk Lavra", NEF Gallery, Kyiv, Ukraine.
- 1997 “Contemporary Ukrainian Fine Art”, Wien, Austria.
- 1997 All-Ukrainian Exhibition of Fine Art, Central House of Artist NSHU, Kyiv, Ukraine.
- 1997 Creations of Ukraine Artists, Paris, France.
- 1998 International Art-Festival, National Art Palace 'Ukrainian House', Kyiv, Ukraine. (catalogue).
- 1998 All-Ukrainian Trienalle “Painting-98”, Central House of Artist NSHU, Kyiv, Ukraine. (catalogue).
- 1998 Personal Exhibition. Ukraine National Philharmonic Society, Kyiv, Ukraine.
- 1999 Winner of the Competition “Ukraine National Art-Rate”, Kyiv, Ukraine.
- 1999 Winner of the Fourth International Art-Festival, National Art Palace 'Ukrainian House', Kyiv, Ukraine. (catalogue).
- 2000 “Contemporary Ukrainian Fine Art”, New York City, US.
- 2000 National mega-project “Ukraine Art of the XXth c.”, National Art Palace 'Ukrainian House', Kyiv, Ukraine. (catalogue).
- 2000 All-Ukrainian Exhibition of Fine Art, Central House of Artist NSHU, Kyiv, Ukraine.
- 2000 Winner of the competition “Ukraine National Art-Rate”, Kyiv, Ukraine.
- 2000 Winner of the Fifth International Art-Festival, National Art Palace 'Ukrainian House', Kyiv, Ukraine. (catalogue).
- 2001 Included into Contemporary Ukraine Encyclopaedia edited by Ivan Juba, Ukraine National Academy of Sciences, Kyiv.
- 2002 International Moscow Salon “CHA-2002”, Central House of Artist, Moscow, Russia.
- 2002 Personal Exhibition. National Historico-cultural Monument "Kyiv-Pechersk Lavra", NEF Gallery, Kyiv, Ukraine.
- 2003 Personal Exhibition. National Historico-cultural Monument. “Kyiv-Pechersk Lavra”, NEF Gallery, Kyiv, Ukraine.
- 2003 Creations of Ukrainian Artists, Ayvazovskiy Museum, Feodosia, Ukraine.
- 2004 Personal Exhibition. National Historico-cultural Monument. “Kyiv-Pechersk Lavra”, NEF Gallery, Kyiv, Ukraine.
- 2004 “ASSOCIATIVE SYMBOLISM” Project, Alexey And (painting), Alexey Vladimirov (sculpture). National Art Palace 'Ukrainian House', Kyiv, Ukraine.
- 2005 All-Ukrainian Exhibition “The World of Leucas”, Odesa, Ukraine.
- 2006 All-Ukrainian Exhibition “Ukraine from the Tripolye until Today Through Images of Contemporary Artists”, Central House of Artist NSHU, Kyiv, Ukraine. (catalogue).
- 2006 All-Ukrainian Exhibition “The World of Leucas”, National Art Museum, Lviv, Ukraine.
- 2006 “Kyiv Paintings”, Central House of Artist NSHU, Kyiv, Ukraine.
- 2009 All-Ukrainian Exhibition “Ukraine from the Tripolye until Today Through Images of Contemporary Artists”, Central House of Artist NSHU, Kyiv, Ukraine. (catalogue).
- 2010 Personal Exhibition “ASSOCIATIVE SYMBOLISM”. Arts Support Fund, Kyiv, Ukraine.
- 2010–2011 Ukrainian Exhibition “Christmas Fantasies”. Arts Support Fund, Kyiv, Ukraine.

== Encyclopedia ==
- 2001 "Encyclopedia of the Suchasnoї Ukraine", ed. Dziuba I. M. A. I. Zhukovsky, Romanіv OM .; National Academy of Sciences Ukraine.
- 2001 "Who's Who in the economy, culture, science", Kyiv, Ukraine.
- 2001 "Who's Who in Ukraine", Kyiv scientific association named. P. Graves

== The main artistic and documentary films ==
- 1996 "And & all involved" the author Valentine Davidenko
- 1997 "Olexiy And", the author Valentine Davidenko
- 2004 Program "Zerkalo (Mirror)" director N. Zozulya, N. Barinov
- 2009 "Ukrainian artist Alexey And", by M. Lebedev
- 2009 "Old fresco", by M. Lebedev
- 2010 "Artist Alex And", by A. Vydrin (TV channel "Art Rada")

== CD disk ==
- Art of Ukraine of the twentieth century, in 2000 the National Art Ukraine's rating
