= William Spindler =

Guatemalan writer and journalist (born 1997)

William Spindler (born in Guatemala City, Guatemala in 1963) is a Guatemalan writer and journalist, whose works include fiction, poetry, and journalism in English and Spanish. He is the author of a novel Paises lejanos, (Magna Terra Editores, 2011, Colección Narrativa) and a book of short stories, Expediciones, published in Bogota, Colombia in 2004. He was educated at the Liceo Guatemala school where he obtained a Bachillerato en Ciencias y Letras (Bachelors in Sciences and Letters) in September 1980. He completed his further education in London, UK after his family moved there in 1981. In 1988 he graduated from the Polytechnic of the South Bank (now the University of the South Bank) in London with an Honours Bachelor of Arts in Modern Languages and International Studies.

As a student, Spindler began to contribute articles, short stories, poetry and book reviews to various newspapers and magazines in the United Kingdom. He wrote both in English and Spanish, sometimes using the name William Spindler Li. While studying for a master's degree at the University of Southampton, Spindler and other Latin American students founded the literary review Encuentros which published fiction, poetry and criticism.

After obtaining his master's degree at the University of Southampton with a thesis on magic realism, Spindler moved to Essex University to explore the subject of his thesis further with a world expert in indigenous artistic and literary sources, with a focus on Latin America. In 1996, Spindler obtained a PhD from the Department of Art History and Theory of the University of Essex, for his work on magic realism and the Latin American novel. His article "Magic realism: a typology" is often quoted in scholarly works on the subject.

In this article, Spindler suggests that there are three kinds of magic realism, which however, are by no means incompatible: European "metaphysical" magic realism, with its sense of estrangement and the uncanny, exemplified by Kafka's fiction, ‘ontological’ magical realism, characterized by "matter-of-factness" in relating "inexplicable" events, and "anthropological" magical realism, where a Native worldview is set side by side to the Western rational worldview.

It has been argued, however, that this definition is tainted by Western biases, not least a bias for mimesis, art as imitation of life and nature. Furthermore, Spindler’s typology of magic realism has been criticized as "an act of categorization which seeks to define Magic Realism as a culturally specific project, by identifying for his readers those (non-modern) societies where myth and magic persist and where Magic Realism might be expected to occur. There are several objections to this type of analysis. It needs to be recognized that models of Western rationalism may not actually describe Western modes of thinking and it is certainly possible to conceive of instances where both these orders of knowledge are simultaneously possible."

In his doctoral thesis, Magical Insurrections: Cultural Resistance and the Magic Realist Novel in Latin America, (University of Essex, 1996), Spindler argued that there is an underlying theme of cultural resistance in the Latin American magic realist novel, which draws its sustenance from the counter-hegemonic characteristics of popular culture. The thesis explores how the notion of cultural resistance has been incorporated into five Latin American magic realist novels: Men of Maize by Miguel Angel Asturias, The Kingdom of This World by Alejo Carpentier, Jose Maria Arguedas' Deep Rivers, Gabriel García Márquez' One Hundred Years of Solitude and Abel Posse's Daimón (1978). Other Latin American texts are used for comparative purposes. The thesis explores the literary, historical and ideological characteristics of the Latin American magic realist novel in relation to cultural resistance, language, hegemony and popular culture in what Spindler calls the "political economy" of magic realism.

Before finishing his Ph.D., Spindler undertook some freelance journalism with the Latin American section of the BBC World Service and the Financial Times in Haiti. After a short spell working with the United Nations in Mozambique, Spindler joined the United Nations High Commissioner for Refugees (UNHCR). William Spindler is currently a spokesman for the UNHCR. He is the author of many articles on humanitarian and refugee issues.
