= Franz Roh =

German historian, photographer and art critic

- Born: 12 February 1890; Apolda, German Empire
- Died: 30 December 1965 (aged 75); Munich, West Germany
- Occupations: Historian, photographer, art critic
- Spouse: Juliane Bartsch

Franz Roh (21 February 1890 – 30 December 1965), was a German historian, photographer, and art critic. Roh is perhaps best known for his 1925 book Nach-Expressionismus: Magischer Realismus: Probleme der neuesten europäischen Malerei ("Post-expressionism: Magical Realism: Problems of the newest European painting") he coined the term magic realism.

Roh was born in Apolda (in present-day Thuringia), Germany. He studied at universities in Leipzig, Berlin, and Basel. In 1920, he received his Ph.D. in Munich for a work on Dutch paintings of the 17th century. As a photographer and critic, he absolutely hated photographs that mimicked painting, charcoal, or drawings. During the Nazi regime, he was isolated and briefly put in jail for his book Foto-Auge (Photo-Eye); he used his jail time he used to write the book Der Verkannte Künstler: Geschichte und Theorie des kulturellen Mißverstehens ("The unrecognized artist: history and theory of cultural misunderstanding"). After the war, in 1946, he married art historian Juliane Bartsch. He died in Munich.

== Roh and magic realism ==
Roh is perhaps best remembered as the critic who coined the term magic realism. But, though the lineage is direct, his magic realism has a very different meaning from the one used to describe the work of writers such as Gabriel García Márquez and Isabel Allende that dominates our current understanding of the term.

Roh, celebrating the post-expressionist return of the visual arts to figural representation, utilized the phenomenology of Edmund Husserl and Martin Heidegger to emphasize that "the autonomy of the objective world around us was once more to be enjoyed; the wonder of matter that could crystallize into objects was to be seen anew."
Roh was, then, emphasizing the "magic" of the normal world as it presents itself to us (i.e., how, when we really look at everyday objects, they can appear strange and fantastic) and not the world of magic (in which objects are literally transformed into something fantastic) that the literary school emphasizes.

Roh himself, writing in the 1950s and perhaps already seeing the confusion his term had caused in this regard, emphasized that his use of the word magic was, "of course not in the religious-psychological sense of ethnology."

Roh's magic realism, though not often written about in recent years, is nonetheless an important contribution to a phenomenological or existential theory of aesthetics. This link is emphasized by the fact that it was the Spanish phenomenologist José Ortega y Gasset's disciple Fernando Vela who translated Roh's essay into Spanish, thereby setting the stage for its appropriation by the literary movement.
