= List of museums and cultural institutions in Greater St. Louis =

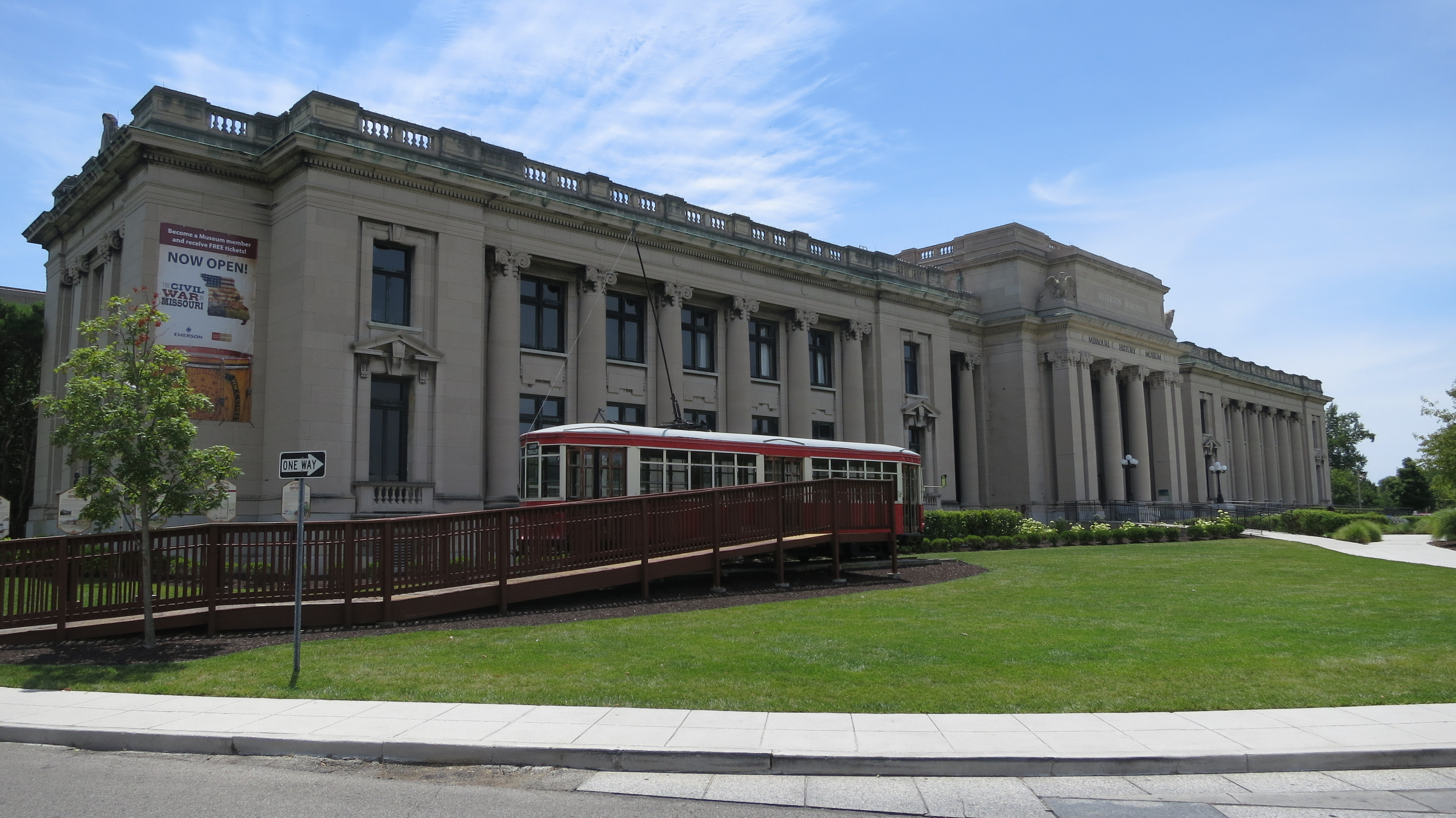
Missouri History Museum

The Greater St. Louis metropolitan area has many cultural institutions and museums including:

- The Gateway Arch and the Museum of Westward Expansion. The Museum of Westward Expansion is an underground museum beneath the Gateway Arch focusing on St. Louis' role in the expansion and settling of the United States west of the Mississippi River before and after the Louisiana Purchase.
- The Saint Louis Art Museum, Missouri History Museum, Jewel Box, Saint Louis Zoo, McDonnell Planetarium, and the Muny are all located in Forest Park, the city's premiere park.
- The City Museum has a collection of re-purposed architectural and industrial objects constituting a multistory play-land. It also features an aquarium and a museum of historical architecture.
- Grand Center is a historic arts and culture district that is home to the Fox Theatre, the Contemporary Art Museum St. Louis, Pulitzer Arts Foundation, and The Sheldon.
- Cahokia Mounds is a national historic site, state historic site, and UNESCO World Heritage Site, Cahokia Mounds hosts an interpretive center with many models and artifacts related to ancient Mississippian culture.
- Mastodon State Historic Site is home to the Kimmswick Bonebed mastodon fossil collection. There is a small museum dedicated to mastodons on site.

== Museums ==
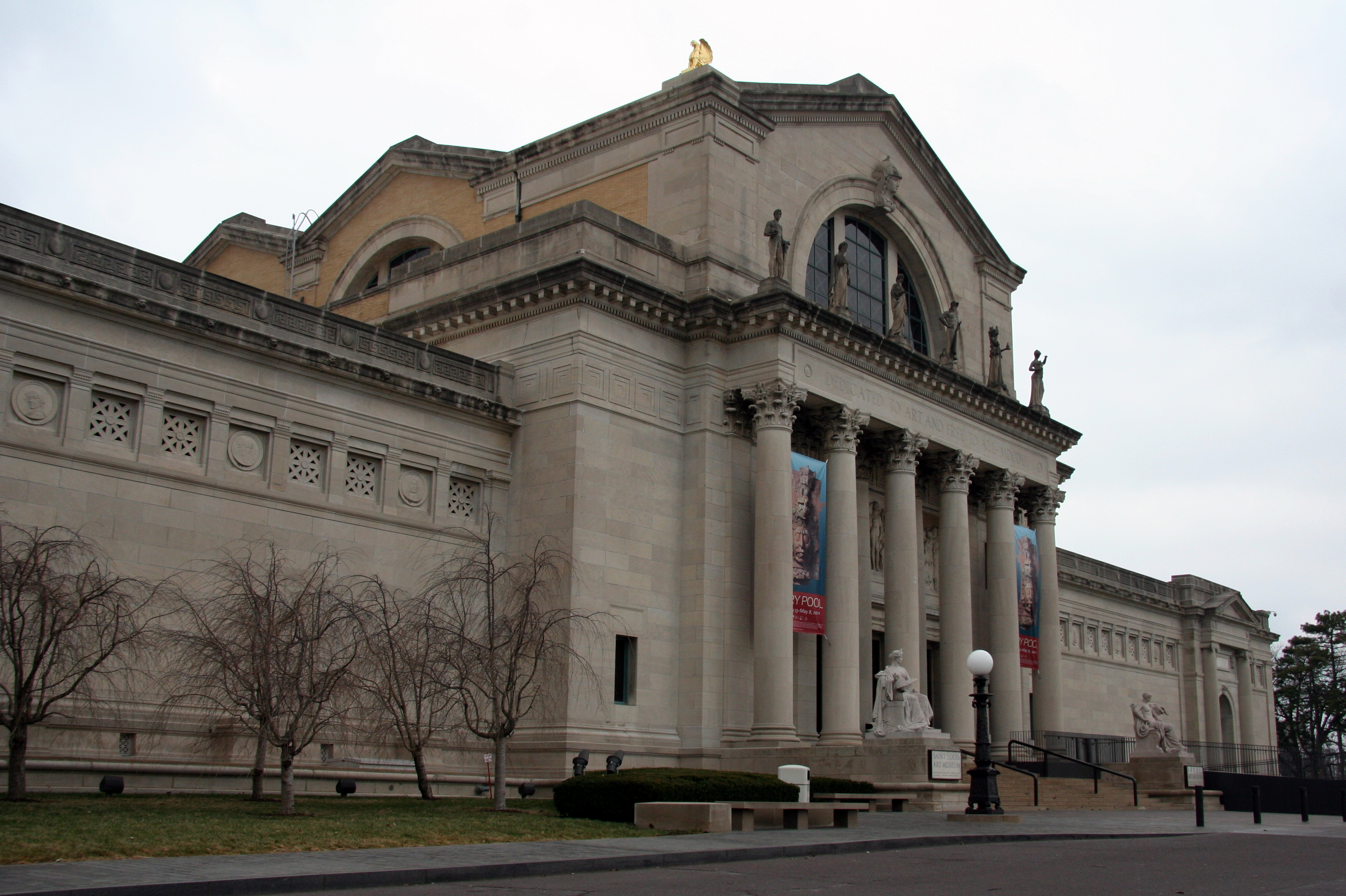
St. Louis Art Museum

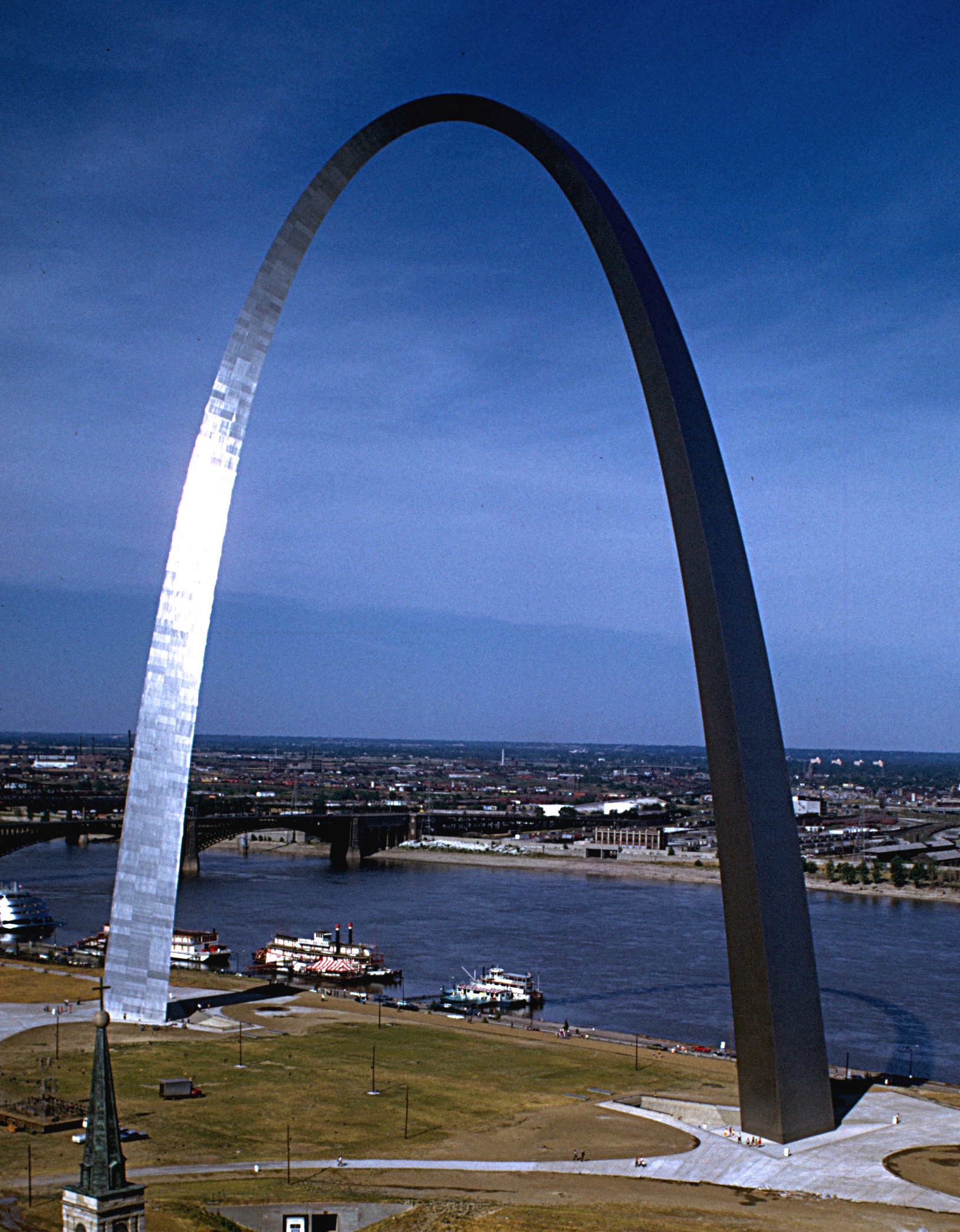
The Gateway Arch

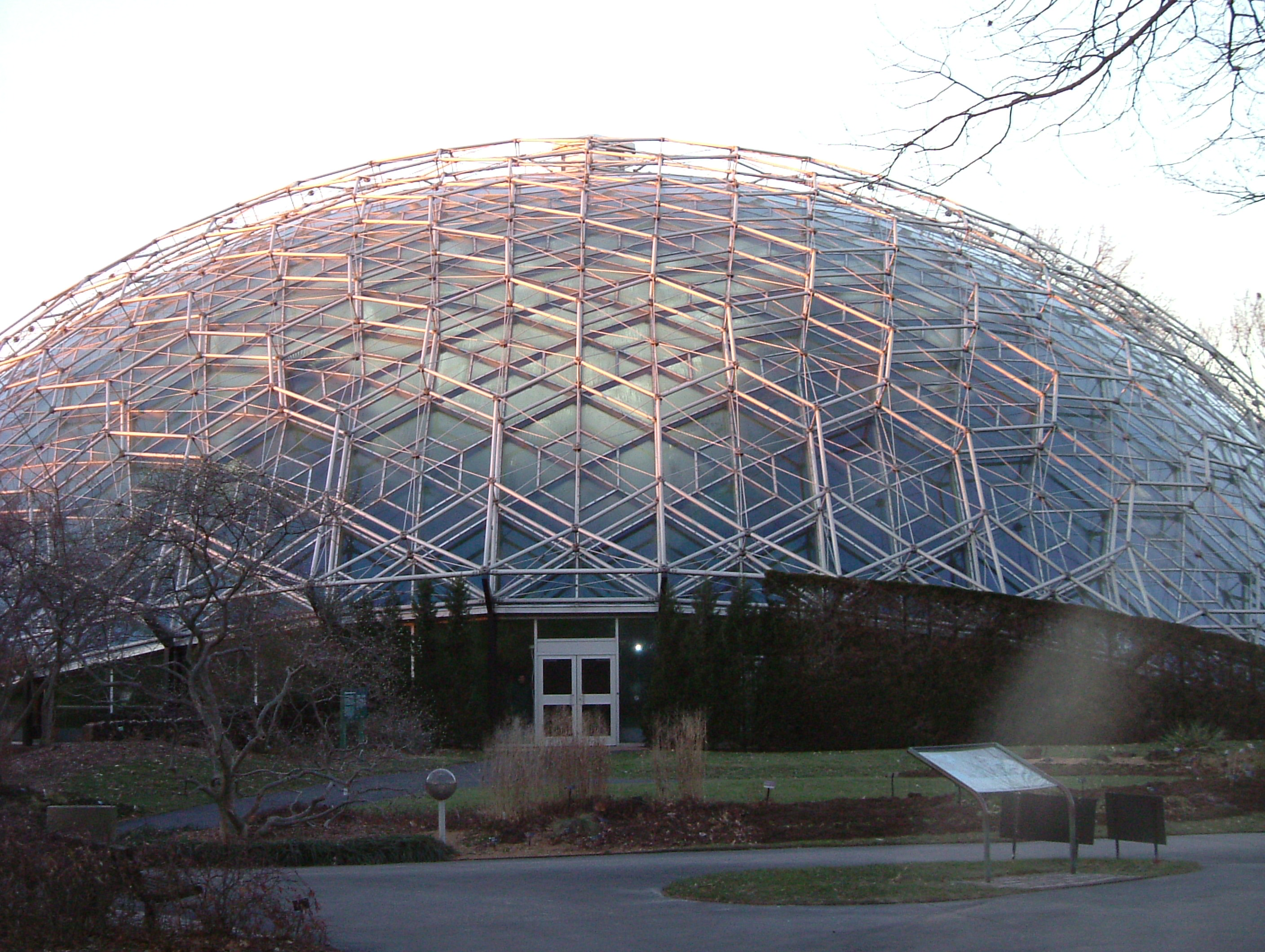
The Climatron

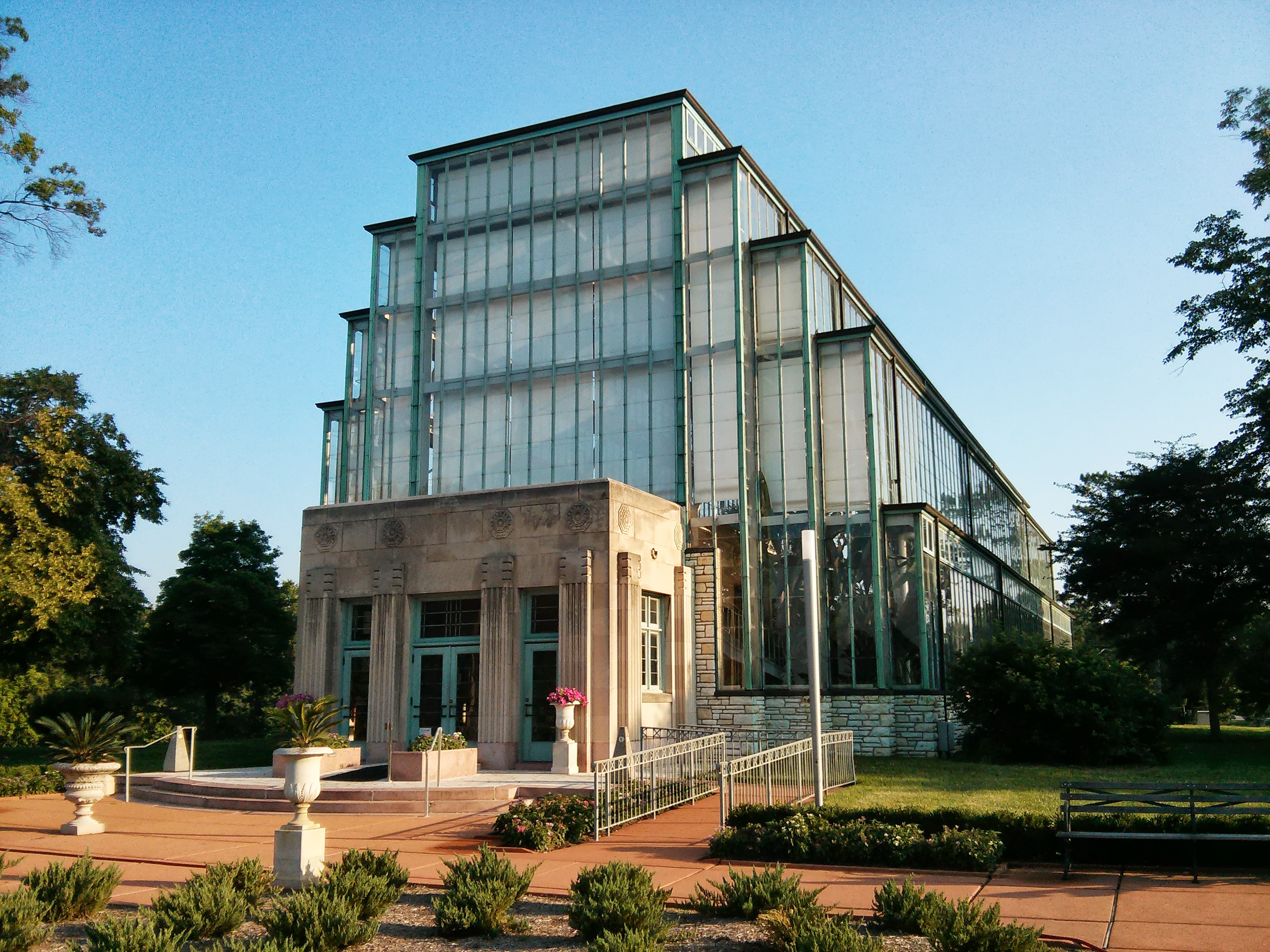
The Jewel Box

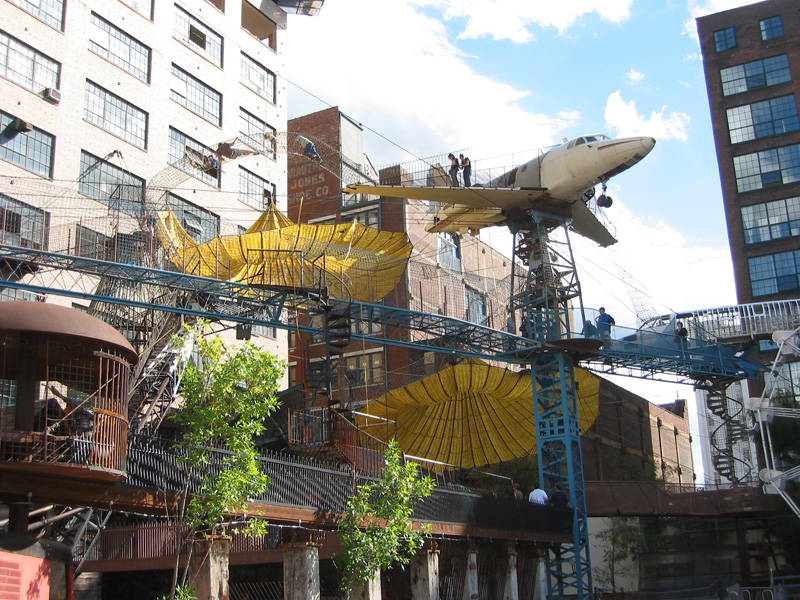
The City Museum

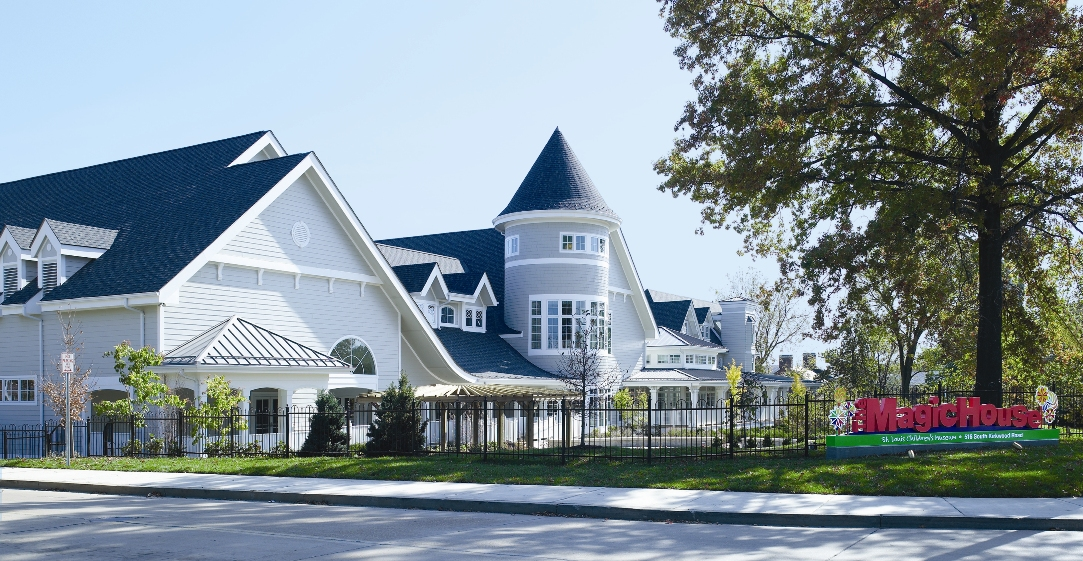
The Magic House

Mcdonnell Planetarium

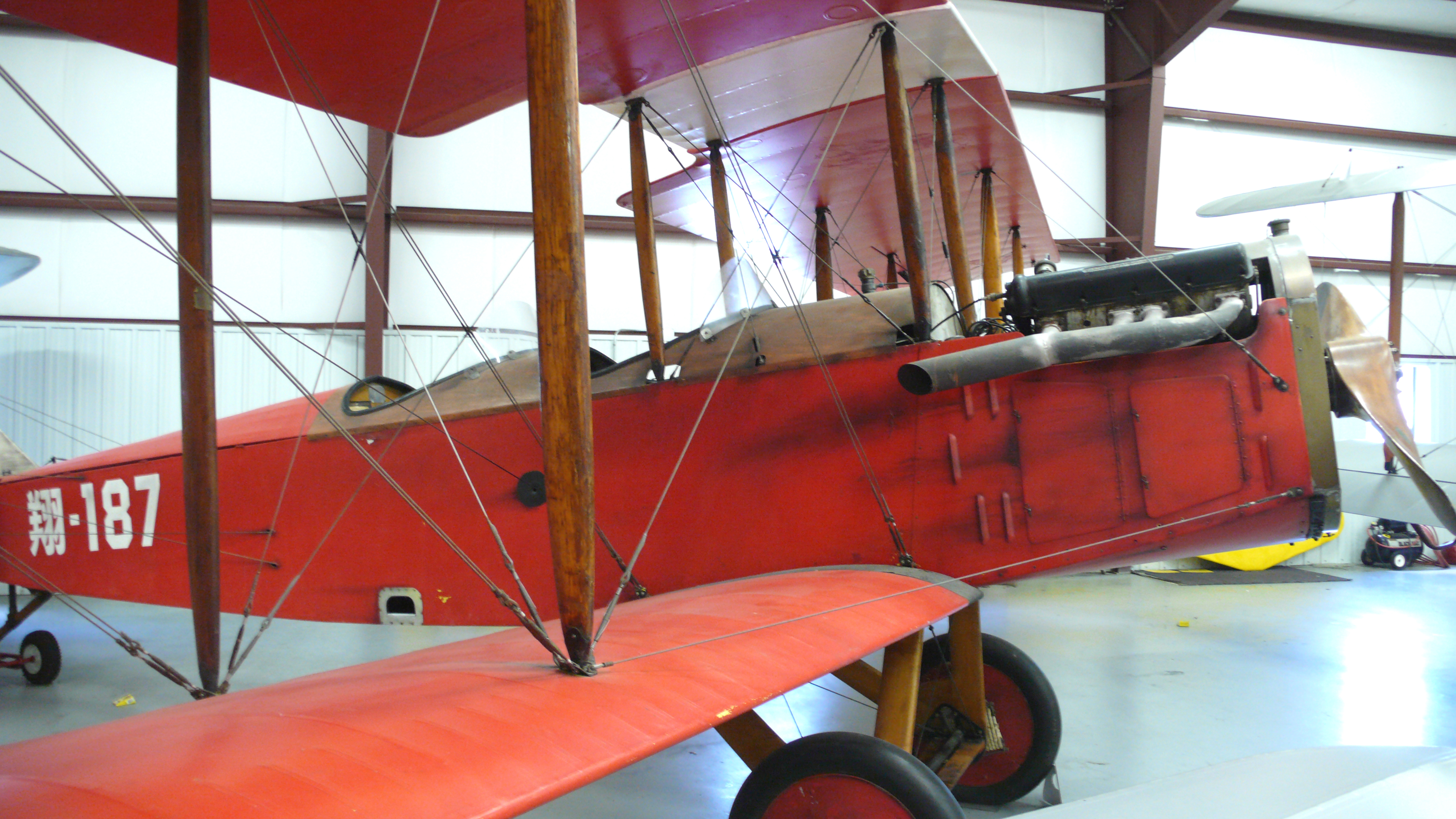
Standard J-1 at the Historic Aircraft Restoration Museum

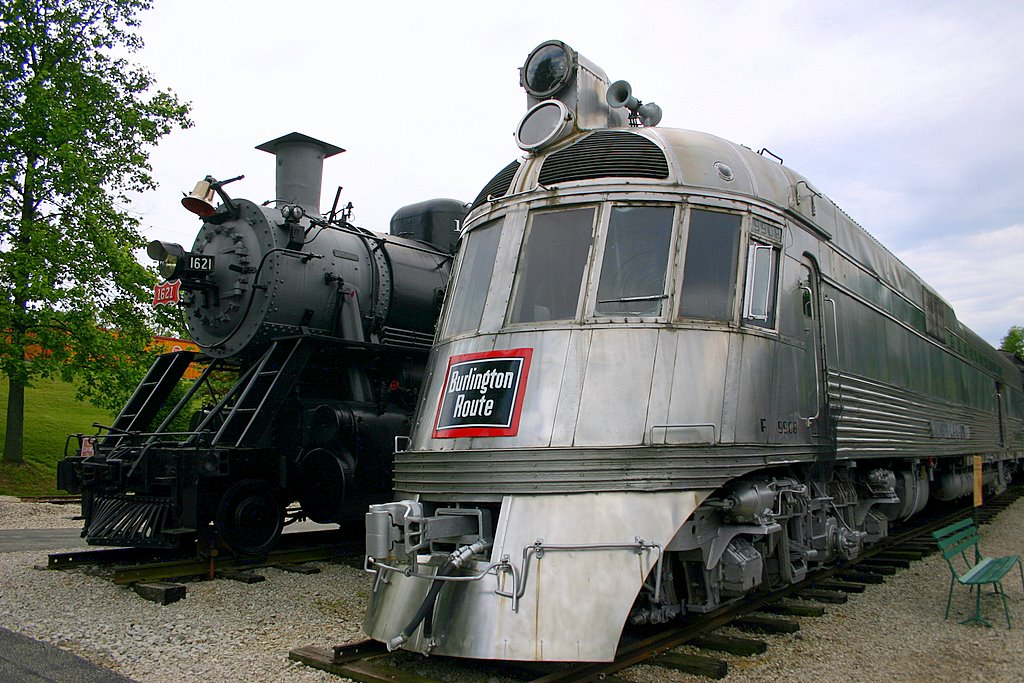
A Burlington Zephyr and a Frisco 2-10-0 on display at the Museum of Transportation

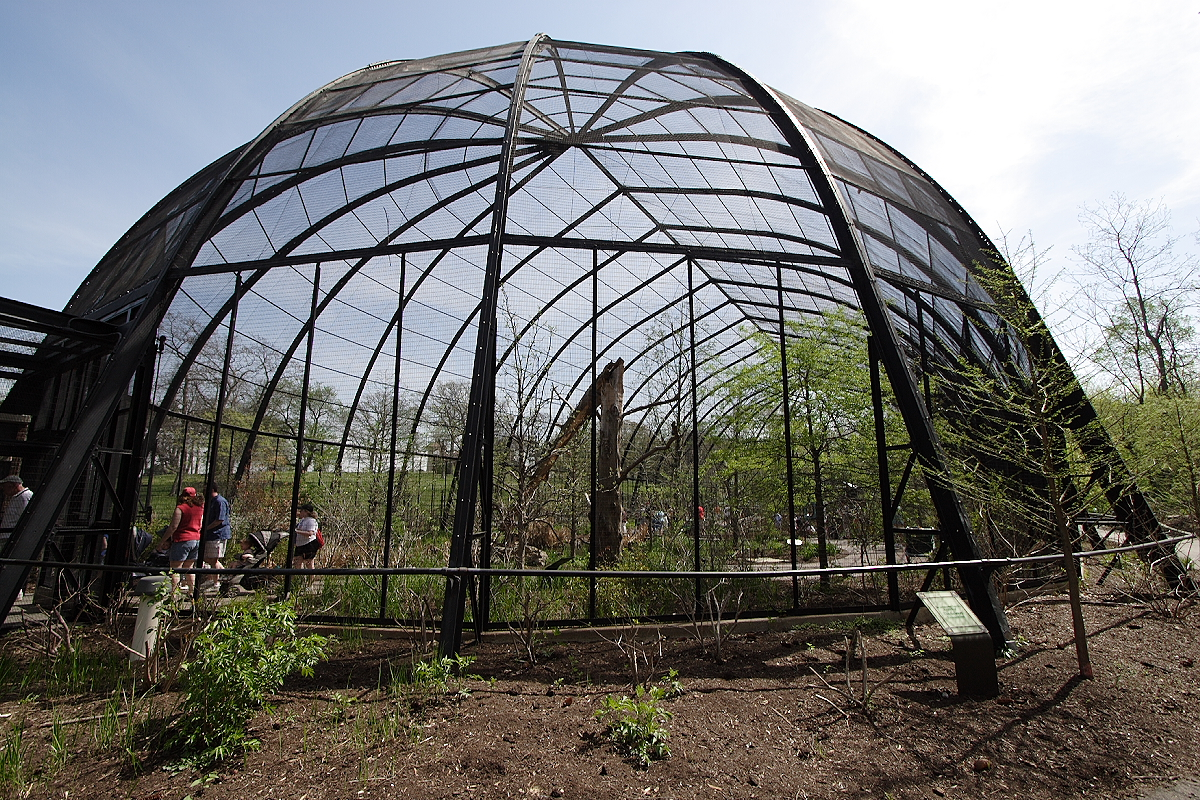
1904 World's Fair Flight Cage at the St. Louis Zoo

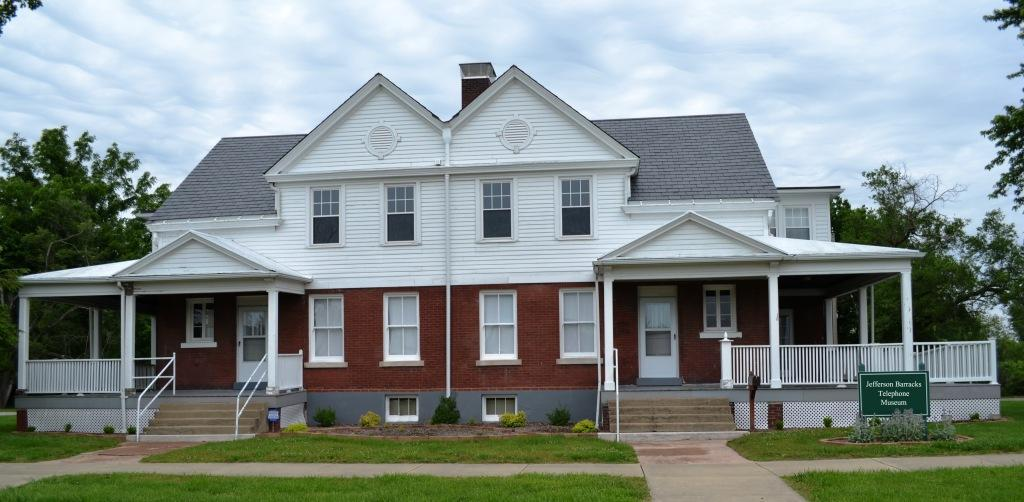
Jefferson Barracks Telephone Museum

=== Art ===
- Center of Creative Arts
- Contemporary Art Museum St. Louis
- Foundry Art Centre
- Gallery 210 at University of Missouri–St. Louis
- International Photography Hall of Fame and Museum
- Laumeier Sculpture Park
- Lemp Neighborhood Arts Center
- May Gallery of Webster University
- Mildred Lane Kemper Art Museum
- Museum of Contemporary Religious Art
- National Blues Museum
- American Kennel Club's Museum of the Dog
- Pulitzer Arts Foundation
- Saint Louis Art Museum
- St. Louis Mercantile Library Art Museum
- Saint Louis University Museum of Art
- The Sheldon Art Galleries
- William and Florence Schmidt Art Center

=== Architecture ===
- Gateway Arch
- Frank Lloyd Wright Kraus House

=== Botanic Conservatory ===
- Jewel Box
- Missouri Botanical Garden

=== Children's ===
- City Museum
- The Magic House, St. Louis Children's Museum

=== History ===
- Alton Museum of History and Art
- Anheuser-Busch Brewery
- Basilica of St. Louis, King of France
- Campbell House Museum
- Carondelet Historic Center
- Cathedral Basilica of Saint Louis
- Chatillon-DeMenil House
- Cupples House
- Daniel Boone Home
- Faust Village
- Eugene Field House
- First Missouri State Capitol State Historic Site
- Fenton Historical Museum
- The Griot Museum of Black History
- Hawken House Museum
- Historic Hanley House
- Historic House Museums of St. Louis
- Jefferson Barracks Museums
- Jefferson Barracks Telephone Museum
- Scott Joplin House State Historic Site
- Kemp Auto Museum
- Lemp Mansion
- Lewis and Clark State Historic Site
- Missouri Civil War Museum
- Missouri History Museum
- Museum of Westward Expansion
- Old Cahokia Courthouse
- Old Courthouse
- Soldiers' Memorial
- St. Charles County Heritage Museum
- St. Louis Kaplan Feldman Holocaust Museum
- Benjamin Stephenson House
- Taille de Noyer
- Thomas Sappington Museum
- Ulysses S. Grant National Historic Site
- Union Station

=== Science, archeology, and natural history ===
- Cahokia Mounds
- Crow Observatory
- Mastodon State Historic Site
- McDonnell Planetarium
- Saint Louis Science Center

=== Sports ===
- National Horseshoe Pitchers Association Hall of Fame and Museum
- St. Louis Cardinals Hall of Fame Museum
- St. Louis Soccer Hall of Fame
- World Chess Hall of Fame

=== Transportation ===
- Greater Saint Louis Air & Space Museum
- Historic Aircraft Restoration Museum
- National Museum of Transportation

=== Zoological ===
- Butterfly House
- World Aquarium
- Saint Louis Zoo

=== Special Interest ===
- First Due Museum
- Miniature Museum of Greater St. Louis
- Craft Alliance

== Festivals and fairs ==
- Cinco de Mayo St. Louis
- Fair Saint Louis
- Great Forest Park Balloon Race
- Greater St. Louis Renaissance Faire
- Kimmswick Apple Butter Festival
- Kimmswick Strawberry Festival
- Missouri Chamber Music Festival
- Opera Theatre of Saint Louis
- Shakespeare Festival of St. Louis
- St. Louis Arts Fair
- St. Louis Brewers Festival
- St. Louis Chinese Culture Day
- St. Louis Earth Day Festival
- St. Louis Festival of Nations
- St. Louis International Film Festival
- St. Louis Jazz & Heritage Festival
- St. Louis Jugglefest
- St. Louis PrideFest
- St. Louis Storytelling Festival
- St. Louis Tap Festival
- St. Louis Wine Festival

== Music, theater and performing arts ==
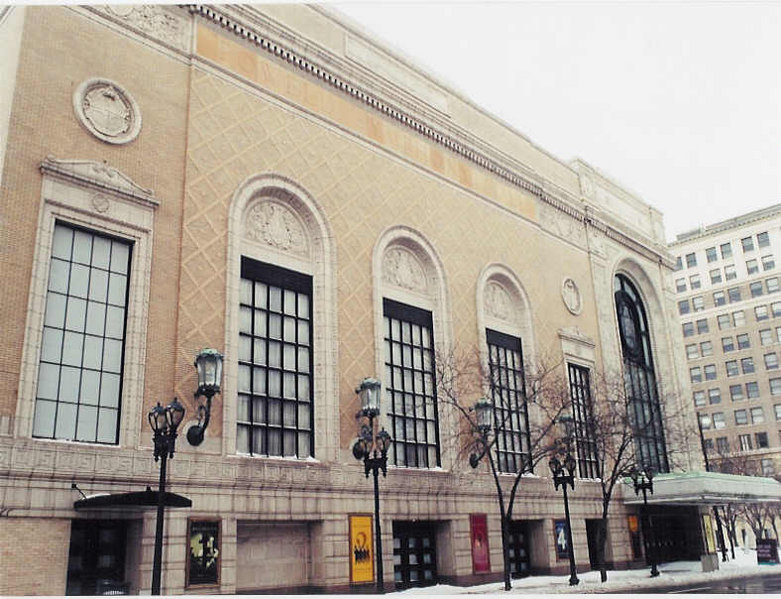
Powell Hall

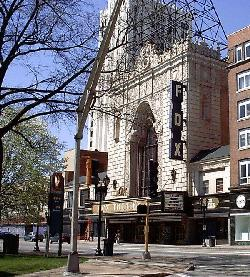
The Fox Theatre in the Grand Center arts district

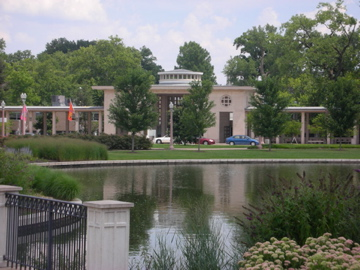
The Muny

=== Opera (companies) ===
- Opera Theatre of Saint Louis
- Union Avenue Opera

=== Opera (houses) ===
- Peabody Opera House

=== Choruses ===
- Saint Louis Chamber Chorus
- St. Louis Children's Choir
- Saint Louis Symphony Chorus

=== Symphonies ===
- St. Louis Symphony
- Saint Louis Symphony Youth Orchestra
- St. Louis Philharmonic

=== Concert Halls ===
- Powell Hall
- The Sheldon Concert Hall

=== Theater (companies) ===
- The Black Repertory Theater
- Conservatory of Theatre Arts
- New Line Theatre
- The Repertory Theatre of St. Louis

=== Theater (houses) ===
- Edison Theater at Washington University
- The Grandel Theatre
- Fox Theatre
- Loretto-Hilton Center for the Performing Arts at Webster University
- The Muny
- Orthwein Theater at Mary Institute and St. Louis Country Day School
- The Touhill Performing Arts Center at the University of Missouri - St. Louis

== See also ==
- Culture of St. Louis
