= List of museums in St. Louis =

This list of museums in St. Louis and non-profit and university art galleries. Museums that exist only in cyberspace (i.e., virtual museums) are not included. Also included are non-profit and university art galleries.

== Museums ==
Name	Neighborhood	Type	Summary
Campbell House Museum	Downtown West	Historic house	1880s Victorian townhouse
Carondelet Historic Center	Carondelet	Local history	website, operated by the Carondelet Historical Society
Cathedral Basilica of Saint Louis	Central West End	Art	Church basement contains a museum dedicated to the mosaics in the church as well as some of the other artifacts found within the Cathedral
Center of Creative Arts	Delmar Loop	Art	Arts center with classes in performing arts and visual arts exhibition gallery
Chatillon–DeMenil House	Benton Park	Historic house	19th-century mansion, features a collection of memorabilia from the 1904 World's Fair
City Museum	Downtown West	Multiple	Eclectic mixture of children's playground, funhouse, surrealistic pavilion, and an architectural marvel made out of found objects
Contemporary Art Museum St. Louis	Midtown	Art	Contemporary art
Craft Alliance Center of Art + Design	Delmar Loop	Art	Contemporary crafts education center with an exhibition gallery
Field House Museum	Downtown	Multiple	Historic home focusing on Roswell Field and Dred Scott, Eugene Field, and toys
The Griot Museum of Black History	St. Louis Place	African-American	Life-size wax figures, art, artifacts and memorabilia to interpret the stories of important African Americans with a regional connection; formerly the Black World History Museum
HealthWorks! Kids' Museum St. Louis	Forest Park	Children's	website
Inside the Economy Museum	Downtown	Economics	website, operated by the Federal Reserve Bank of St. Louis, explains the economy and people's role in it
International Photography Hall of Fame and Museum	Midtown	Art	website, also known as IPHF, exhibits include history of photography, cameras and equipment, changing exhibits of historic and contemporary photography. The public museum closed in 2022; exhibitions continue to be hed online.
Gateway Arch National Park	Downtown	History	Includes the Museum of Westward Expansion and Old Courthouse
Judicial Learning Center	Downtown	Economics	website, located in the Thomas F. Eagleton United States Courthouse, explains the function and value of the judicial branch of government, especially at the federal level
Lemp Neighborhood Arts Center	Benton Park	Art	Community arts center
Mildred Lane Kemper Art Museum	St. Louis	Art	Part of Washington University in St. Louis, collections include 19th, 20th, and 21st-century European and American paintings, sculptures, prints, installations, and photographs
Henry Miller Museum	JeffVanderLou	Labor history	website, founder of the National Brotherhood of Electrical Workers
Miniature Museum of Greater St. Louis	Bevo Mill	Toy	website, doll houses and miniatures
Missouri History Museum	Forest Park	History	Operated by the Missouri Historical Society
The MOTO Museum	Midtown	Transportation	website, private collection of unique motorcycles obtained from over 20 countries
Museum of Contemporary Religious Art	Midtown	Art	Part of Saint Louis University, interfaith museum of contemporary art that engages religious and spiritual themes
National Blues Museum	Downtown	Music	Musical history and impact of the blues
Old Courthouse	Downtown	History	Part of Gateway Arch National Park, site of Dred Scott trial, houses dioramas of westward expansion and settlement of Missouri
Pulitzer Arts Foundation	Midtown	Art	Contemporary art, architecture and culture
Saint Louis Art Museum	Forest Park	Art	Collection includes art from around the world and many eras
Saint Louis University Museum of Art	Midtown	Art	Part of Saint Louis University, collections include modern art, Asian decorative arts, Jesuit and Catholic art and artifacts that reflect the frontier experience of the Jesuit missionaries
Samuel Cupples House	Midtown	Decorative arts	Part of Saint Louis University, historic house that serves as a gallery for the university's collection of fine and decorative art dating before 1919, McNamee Gallery hosts exhibitions of art by SLU students and faculty and visiting artists
Scott Joplin House State Historic Site	Midtown	Biographical	Home of composer Scott Joplin from 1900 to 1903
The Sheldon	Midtown	Art	Concert hall and Sheldon Art Galleries
Soldiers' Memorial	Downtown West	Military	Military displays and memorabilia from World War I and subsequent American wars
St. Louis Soccer Hall of Fame	Southwest Garden	Sports	Soccer history from the St. Louis area, currently closed
St. Louis Union Station Memories Museum	Downtown West	Railroad	History of the historic railroad station and rail travel in the U.S.
St. Louis Cardinals Hall of Fame Museum	Downtown	Sports	
St. Louis Science Center	Forest Park	Science	Features over 750 exhibits in a complex of over 300,000 square feet (28,000 m2) and a planetarium
World Aquarium	Downtown	Natural history	
World Chess Hall of Fame	Central West End	History	Honors achievements in the game of chess

== See also ==
- List of museums and cultural institutions in Greater St. Louis

== Defunct museums ==
- Cementland, St. Louis, outdoor sculpture park, future uncertain since death of creator in 2011
- Civilian Conservation Corps Museum, St. Louis, closed in 2008
- International Bowling Museum, St. Louis, moved to Arlington, Texas in 2010
- National Video Game and Coin-Op Museum, St. Louis, closed in 1999
- St. Louis Museum
