= Salma Arastu =

Indian artist, living in North America

Salma Arastu (born 1950) is an artist whose work takes inspiration from her cultural background and experiences. Born in Rajasthan, India to a Sindhi, she was raised Hindu and later converted to Islam and moved to the United States in 1986. She lived and worked in Bethlehem, Pennsylvania from 1987 to 2006, before moving to Oakland, California. She creates paintings, sculpture, poetry and calligraphy and produces greeting cards for the American Muslim community.

Arastu has exhibited her paintings internationally. Her work is held in the permanent collection of the Museum of Contemporary Religious Art, St. Louis, Missouri, the 9/11 Memorial Museum, New York, NY, and she has earned several grants for her work. Arastu received a Masters degree in Fine Art from the Maharaja Sayajirao University of Baroda.

== Work ==
Arastu's art is influenced by the imagery, sculpture, and writings of both Indian heritage and Islamic spirituality. She has stated that her experiences in different world cultures have enriched her artistic style. While living and working in Iran and Kuwait, she was exposed to Islamic arts and Arabic calligraphy.

Arastu's work include themes such as hope, and seeking oneness among humanity, the earth, and soul. She claims that her work carries an "ecological consciousness", exemplified in her series "Mycelial Flow" and "Tiny Creatures: Our Invisible Sustainers." In these series, she explores symbiosis between organisms, drawing attention to the role of microbes as decomposers.

Arastu has received grants from the East Bay Community Foundation’s "Fund for Artists" (2020, 2014, 2012), Oakland, CA and the City of Berkeley Individual artist grant, in 2015 and 2016 Berkeley, CA.

Her work has been written about in Islamic Horizons journal Tikkun, India-West Performance Art Journal among other publications.

== Exhibitions ==
Arastu's work has been shown in several group and solo exhibitions including:

- 2015: Museum of Contemporary Religious Art. St. Louis University, St. Louis, MO
- 2006 September: Artjaz Gallery in Philadelphia, PA
- 2005 September: The Hope Horn Gallery Scranton University, Scranton PA
- 2005 February: Radford University Art Museum, Radford University, Radford, VA
- 2003 Black Cultural Center, Lafayette College, and Easton, PA
- 1998 De Art Magick, Easton, Pennsylvania
