= Jewel Box (St. Louis) =

- U.S. National Register of Historic Places
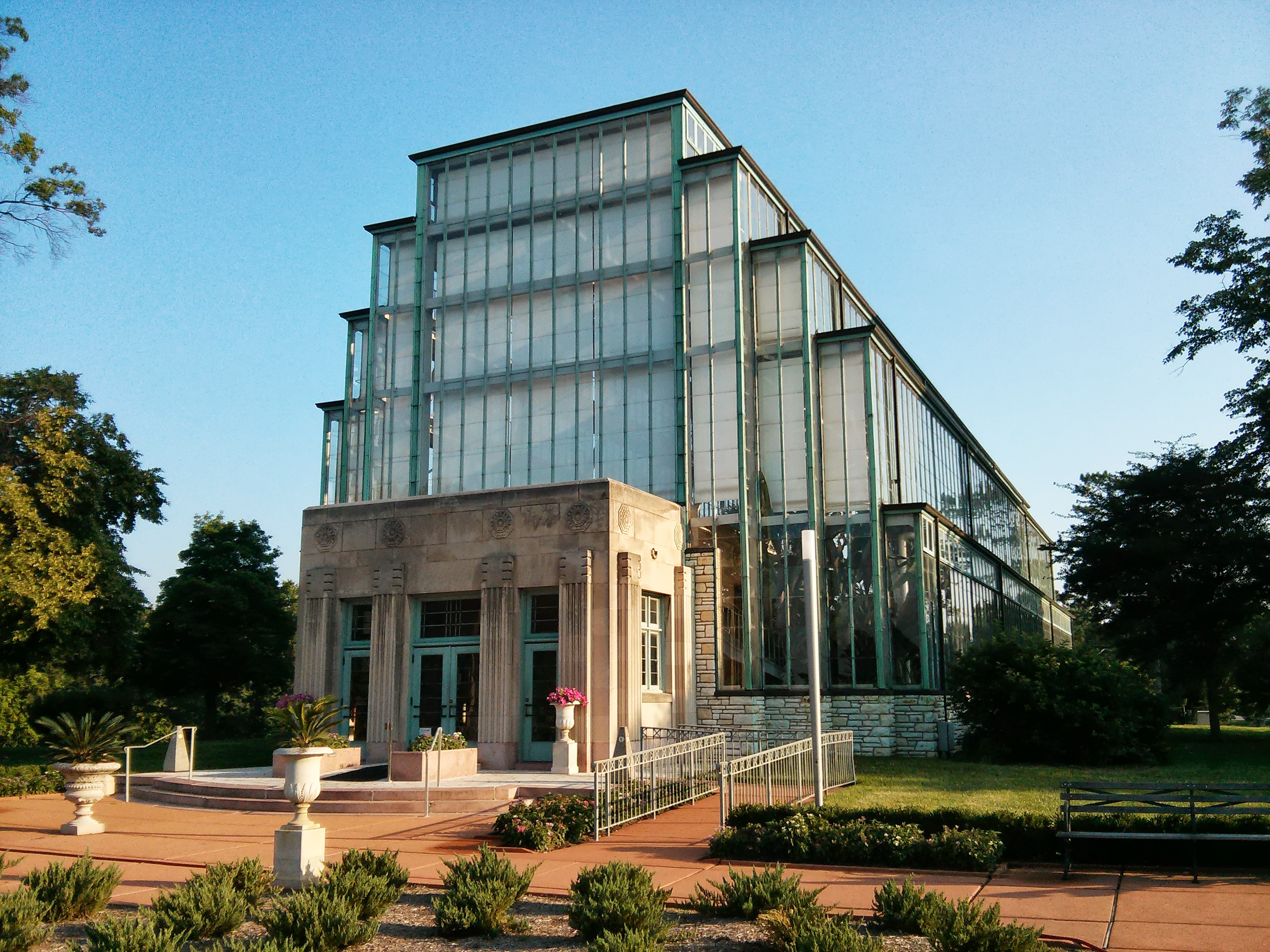

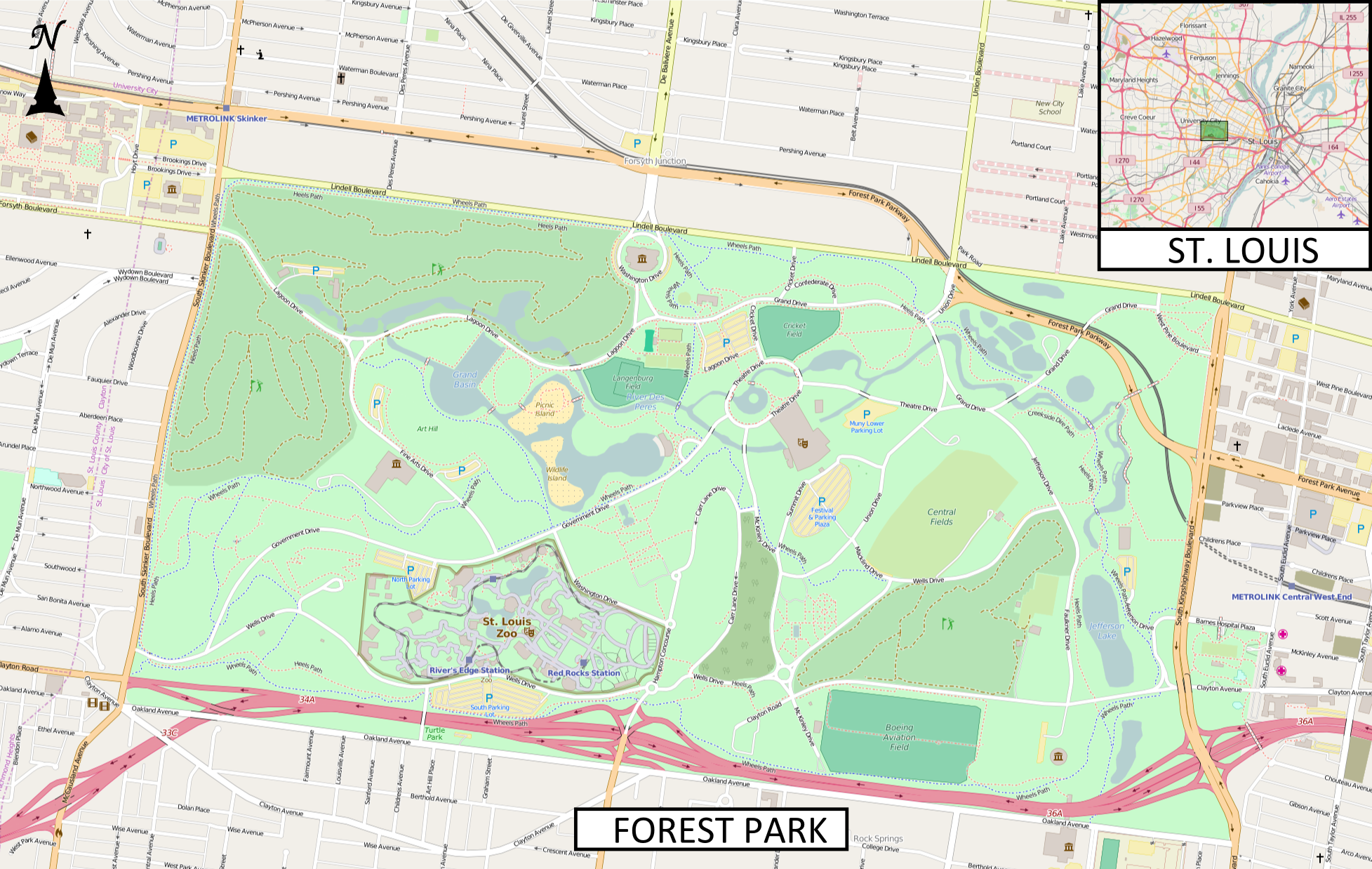
- Location within Forest Park (St. Louis)
- Location: Forest Park; St. Louis, Missouri, United States
- Coordinates: 38°38′07″N 90°16′49″W
- Built: 1936
- Architect: William C. E. Becker
- Architectural style: Art Deco
- NRHP reference No.: 00000147
- Added to NRHP: March 14, 2000

The Jewel Box (also known as the St. Louis Floral Conservatory) is an Art Deco display greenhouse in Forest Park, St. Louis, Missouri. Designed by William C. E. Becker and completed in 1936 with Public Works Administration support, it replaced earlier seasonal greenhouse displays and became a permanent floral conservatory. The building’s stepped glass form and surrounding reflecting pools make it one of the park’s most distinctive structures. Listed on the National Register of Historic Places in 2000 and restored in 2002, it remains in use as a public conservatory and event space.

== History ==
During the winter of 1916–1917, Forest Park head gardener John Moritz transformed part of an existing greenhouse into a formal display featuring flowers, water elements, and seating, which developed into rotating seasonal exhibitions by the 1920s. Moritz and his staff also used the exhibit as an educational tool, demonstrating plant varieties suited to different neighborhoods across the city, including districts affected by industrial smoke and gas. The display became known as the “Jewel Box” in 1926 after a visitor likened the floral arrangements to a jewel box.

Growing public interest led the city to commission a new permanent conservatory. Designed by engineer William C. E. Becker and constructed in 1936 by the Robert Paulus Construction Company with assistance from the Public Works Administration, the new structure—officially named the St. Louis Floral Conservatory—opened on 14 November 1936. Early exhibitions, including a chrysanthemum display of more than 3,000 plants, drew large crowds, and attendance during 1938–1939 approached 416,000 visitors.

Use of the Jewel Box expanded over time from floral exhibitions to include weddings and public events. Attendance declined by the mid-1970s amid budget constraints, but renewed preservation efforts followed. The structure was listed in the National Register of Historic Places in 2000 and underwent an 11-month, $3.5 million restoration completed in 2002, funded largely through private support from Forest Park Forever, a private nonprofit conservancy, and Bank of America. The renovation replaced mechanical systems, improved climate control, and made the building accessible to visitors with disabilities while restoring its historic landscape setting. Today, the Jewel Box continues to function as a floral conservatory and event venue within Forest Park.

== Architecture ==
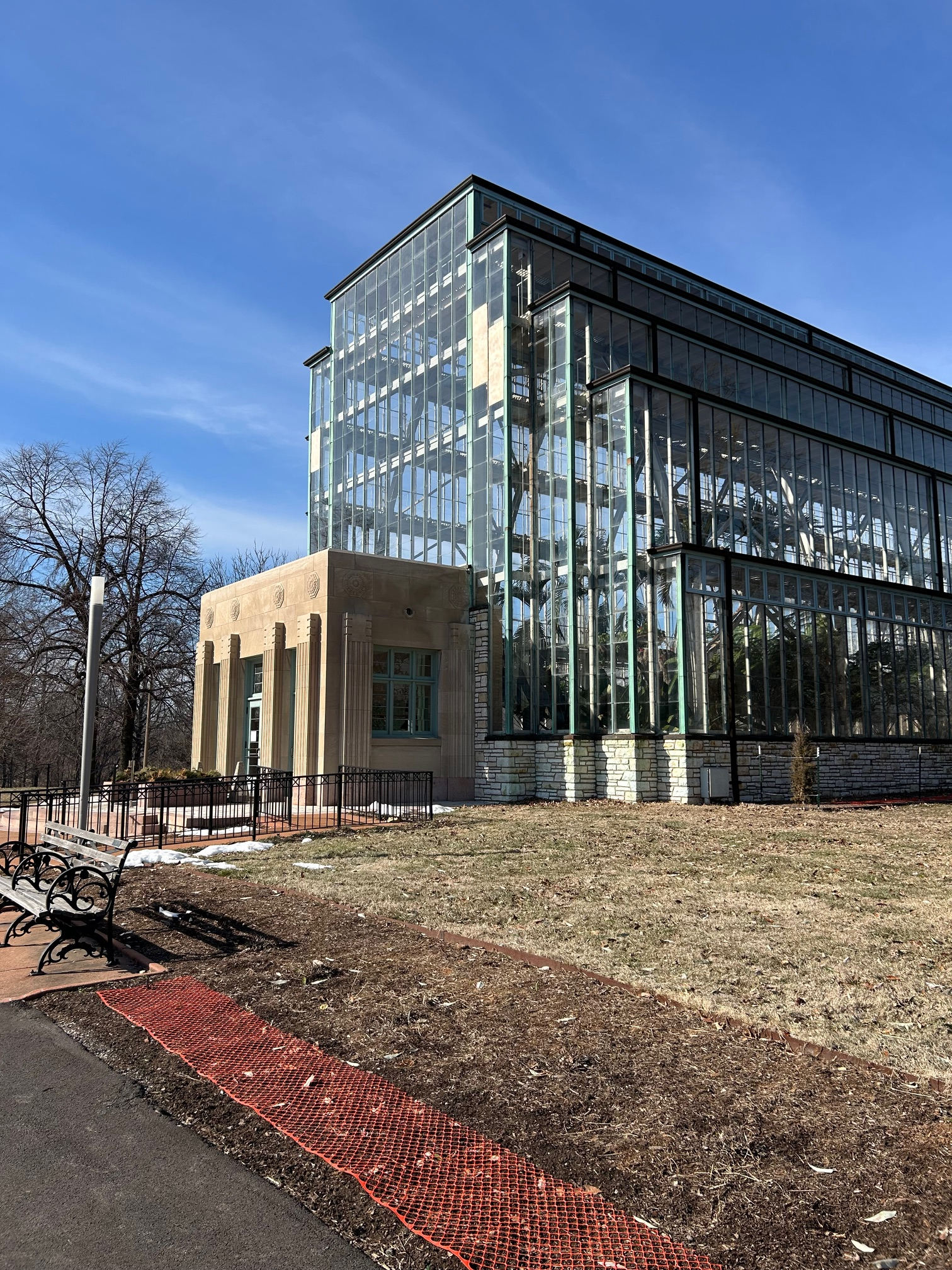
Jewel Box, 2026

The Jewel Box is an Art Deco display greenhouse located at the intersection of Wells and McKinley Drives in Forest Park, St. Louis. Designed by city engineer William C. E. Becker and completed in 1936, the structure was conceived to maximize winter sunlight, minimize maintenance, and resist hail damage that commonly affected conventional greenhouses. Its innovative design was initially viewed with skepticism by greenhouse builders but later proved influential.

The building measures approximately 144 feet in length and 55 feet in width and is constructed on a rock-faced ashlar foundation. Vertical glass walls rise to five stepped, flat-roofed tiers incorporating clerestories, with more than 16,000 square feet of plate glass set within wood and wrought-iron framing. Interior structural elements include wood planking ceilings supported by iron joists, while a limestone vestibule forms the principal entrance. Reflecting pools and pedestrian paths surrounding the conservatory integrate the structure into the broader landscape of Forest Park.

== See also ==
- Climatron, a large geodesic dome greenhouse at the Missouri Botanical Garden
- Garfield Park Conservatory
- Oak Park Conservatory
