= Mastodon State Historic Site =

Historic/archaeological site in Missouri, United States

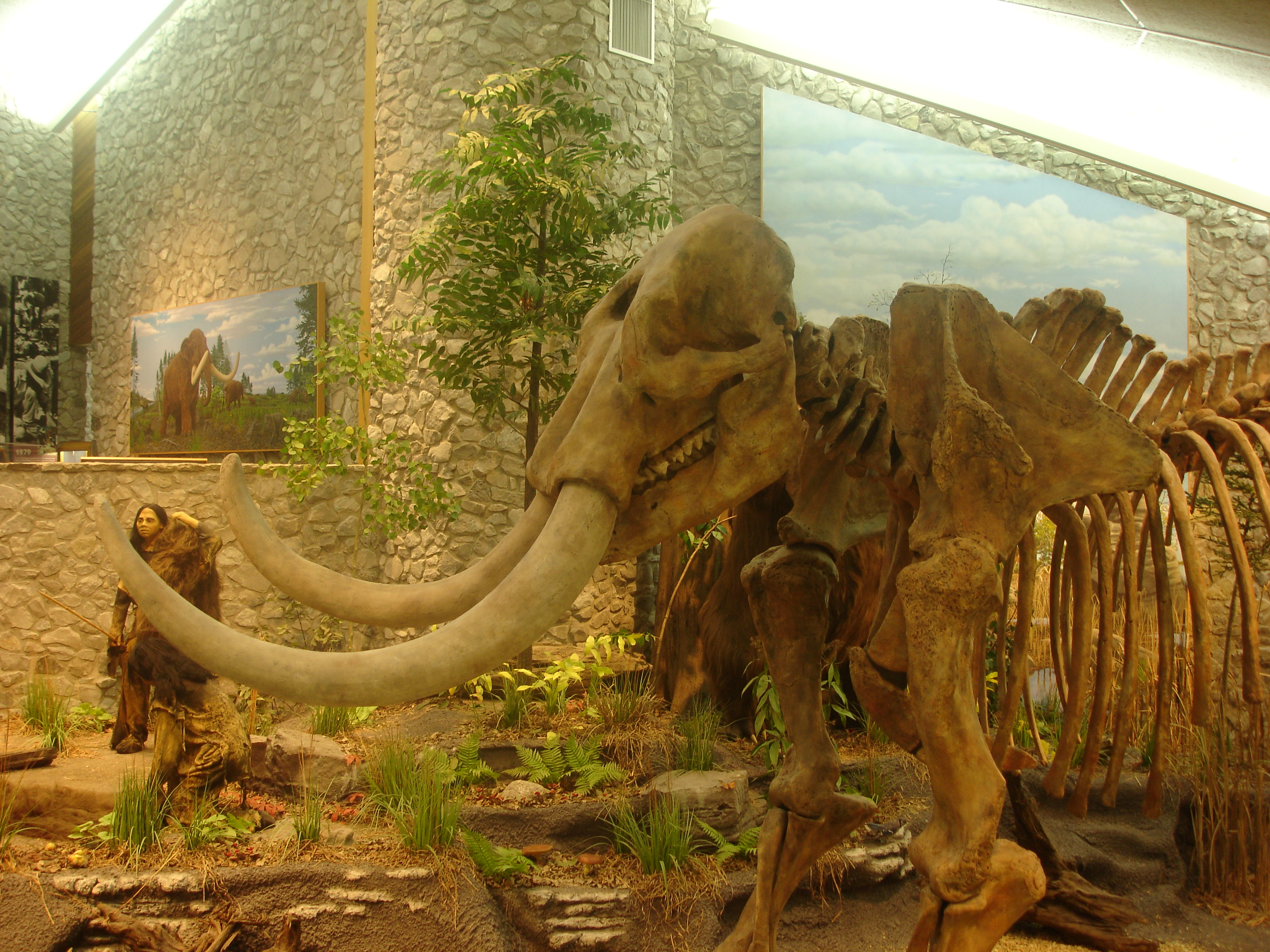
- Skeleton museum display

- Location within Missouri Location within the United States
- Location: Jefferson County, Missouri, United States
- Coordinates: 38°22′45″N 90°23′41″W
- Area: 431.14 acres (174.48 ha)
- Elevation: 417 ft (127 m)
- Established: 1976
- Visitors: 677,188 (in 2022)
- Operator: Missouri Department of Natural Resources
- Website: Mastodon State Historic Site
- Kimmswick Bone Bed
- U.S. National Register of Historic Places
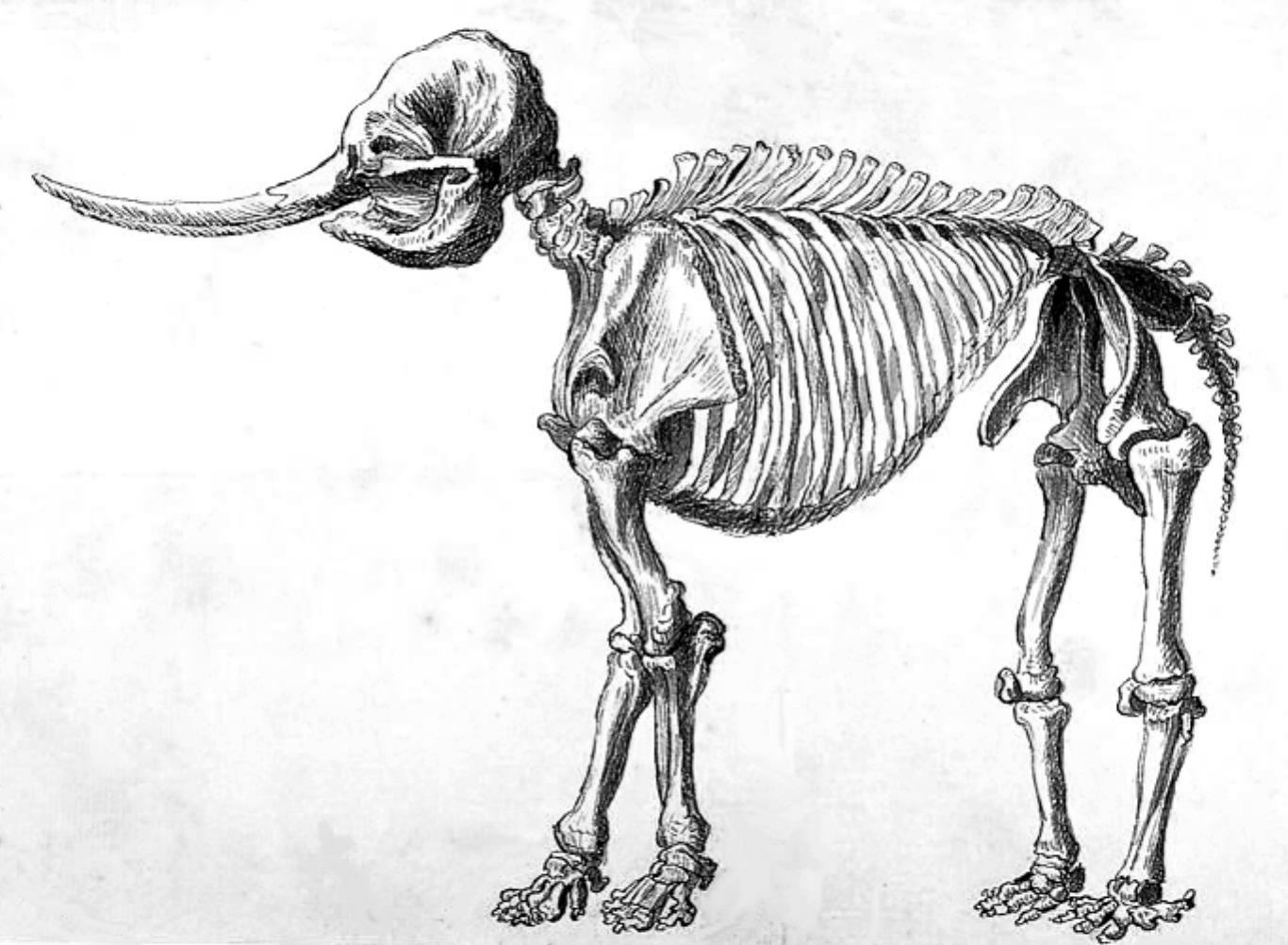
- Drawing of a mastodon skeleton by Rembrandt Peale
- Location: Jefferson County, Missouri, USA
- NRHP reference No.: 80002371
- Added to NRHP: November 5, 1980

Mastodon State Historic Site is a publicly owned, 431-acre (174 ha) archaeological and paleontological site with recreational features in Imperial, Missouri, maintained by the Missouri Department of Natural Resources, preserving the Kimmswick Bone Bed. Bones of mastodons and other now-extinct animals were first found here in the early 19th century. The area gained fame as one of the most extensive Pleistocene ice age deposits in the country and attracted scientific interest worldwide.

The site was purchased by the state in 1976 following an effort to preserve it from destruction with the construction of Interstate 55. Archaeological history was made at the site in 1979 when scientists excavated a stone spear point made by hunters of the Clovis culture (14,000–10,000 years ago) in direct association with mastodon bones. This was the first solid evidence of the coexistence of people and these giant prehistoric beasts. The Kimmswick Bone Bed was added to the National Register of Historic Places in 1987.

== Activities and amenities ==
A museum tells the natural and cultural story of the oldest American Indian site one can visit in the state's park system. A full-size replica of a mastodon skeleton highlights the exhibits. A picnic area, hiking trails, and a special-use campground offer chances to explore the land where the lives of Native Americans and mastodons once intertwined.
