= Climatron =

Geodesic dome greenhouse in St. Louis, MO

Coordinates: 38°36′51″N 90°15′32″W

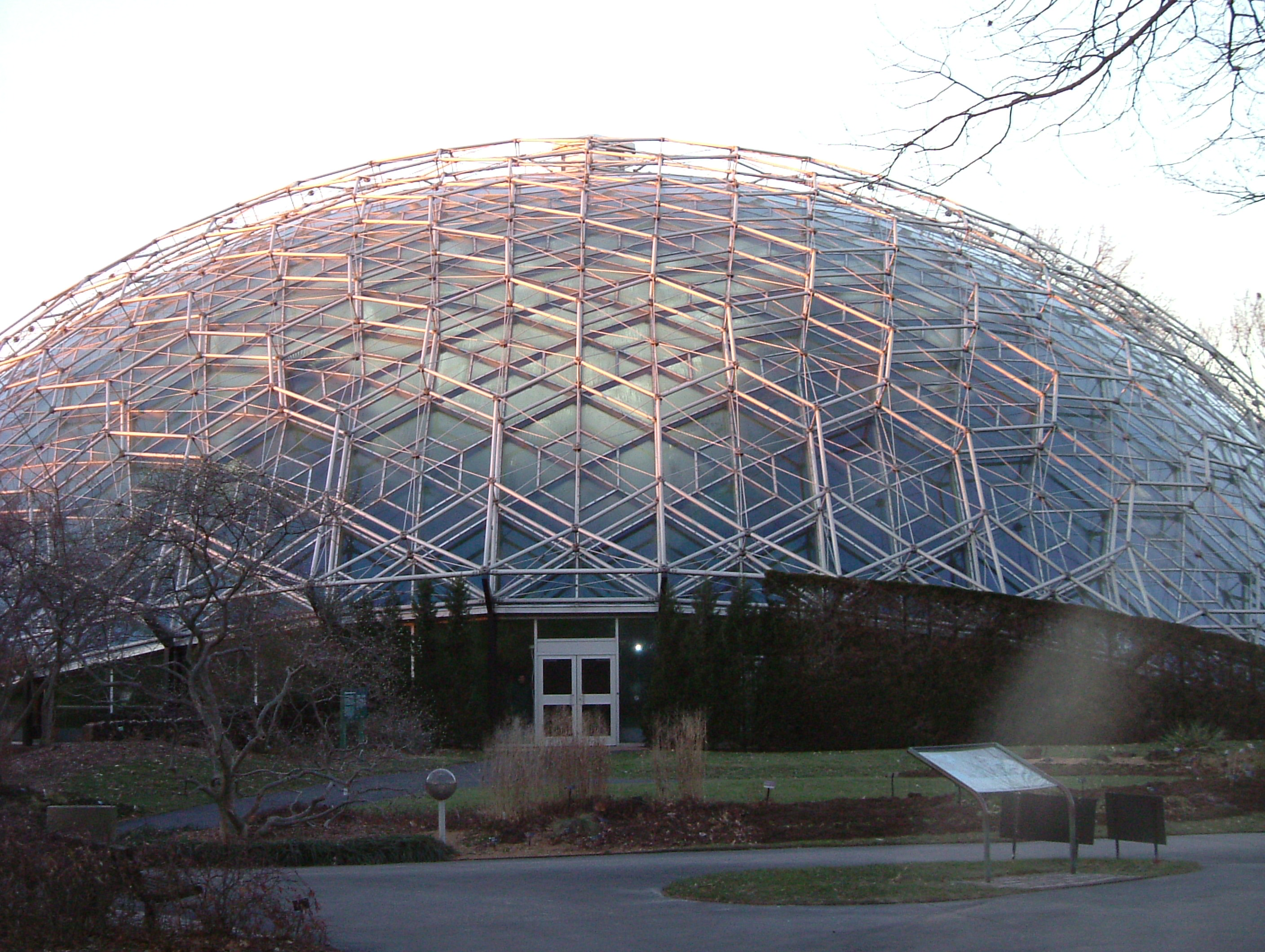
The Climatron greenhouse at the Missouri Botanical Garden, side entrance, 2004

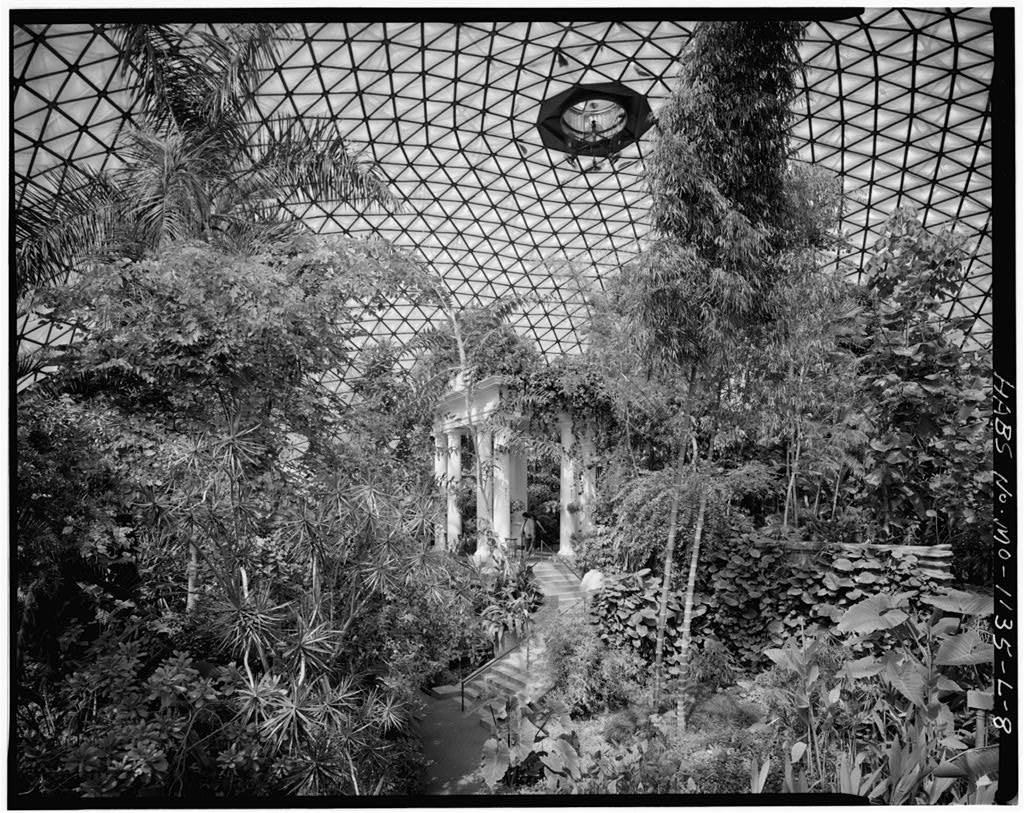
Interior of the Climatron as it was in the early 1980s (HABS photo – August 1983)

The Climatron is a greenhouse enclosed in a geodesic dome that is part of the Missouri Botanical Garden in St. Louis. Initiated by then Garden director Frits W. Went, the dome is the world's first completely air-conditioned greenhouse and the first geodesic dome to be enclosed in rigid Plexiglass (Perspex) panels. Completed in 1960, it was designed by T. C. Howard, of Synergetics, Inc., Raleigh, North Carolina. The broad climatic range within the dome, which recreates a lowland rain forest, is achieved by sophisticated climate controls without using interior partitions.

The structure is an unpartitioned half-sphere dome, 42 m in diameter and 21 m high. The frame is supported by aluminum tubes under compression and aluminum rods under tension. The St. Louis architects Murphy and Mackey were the architects on record. Synergetics, Inc were the designers of the dome. The architects received the 1961 R. S. Reynolds Memorial Award of $25,000 for their architectural use of aluminum. In 1976 it was named one of the 100 most significant architectural achievements in United States history.

The dome contains a small stone pre-existing neo-classical pavilion and over 400 varieties of plant life. A bank of 24 flood lights, revolving at night in five-minute cycles, simulates noon light on one side of the dome and moonlight on other side. The climate ranges from the Amazon through Hawaii and Java to India.

Over time, the building experienced deterioration of the original Plexiglas panels and the adverse effect of humidity on some metal elements. The greenhouse was closed for extensive renovations in 1988 and reopened in March 1990. The original Plexiglas glazing was replaced with 2,425 panes of heat-strengthened glass (containing a plastic interlayer called Saflex) and coated with a low-emissivity film. In 2010, the Botanical Garden celebrated the 50th anniversary of the Climatron.

== See also ==
- Buckminster Fuller, patented the geometry for geodesic domes, lecturer, inventor, and author
- Jewel Box (St. Louis, Missouri), a previous greenhouse built in St. Louis in Forest Park
- Saint Louis Science Center, a museum whose original 1963 planetarium building has a unique hyperboloid structure
- Mitchell Park Horticultural Conservatory
- List of botanical gardens in the United States
- Phytotron
