= World Aquarium =

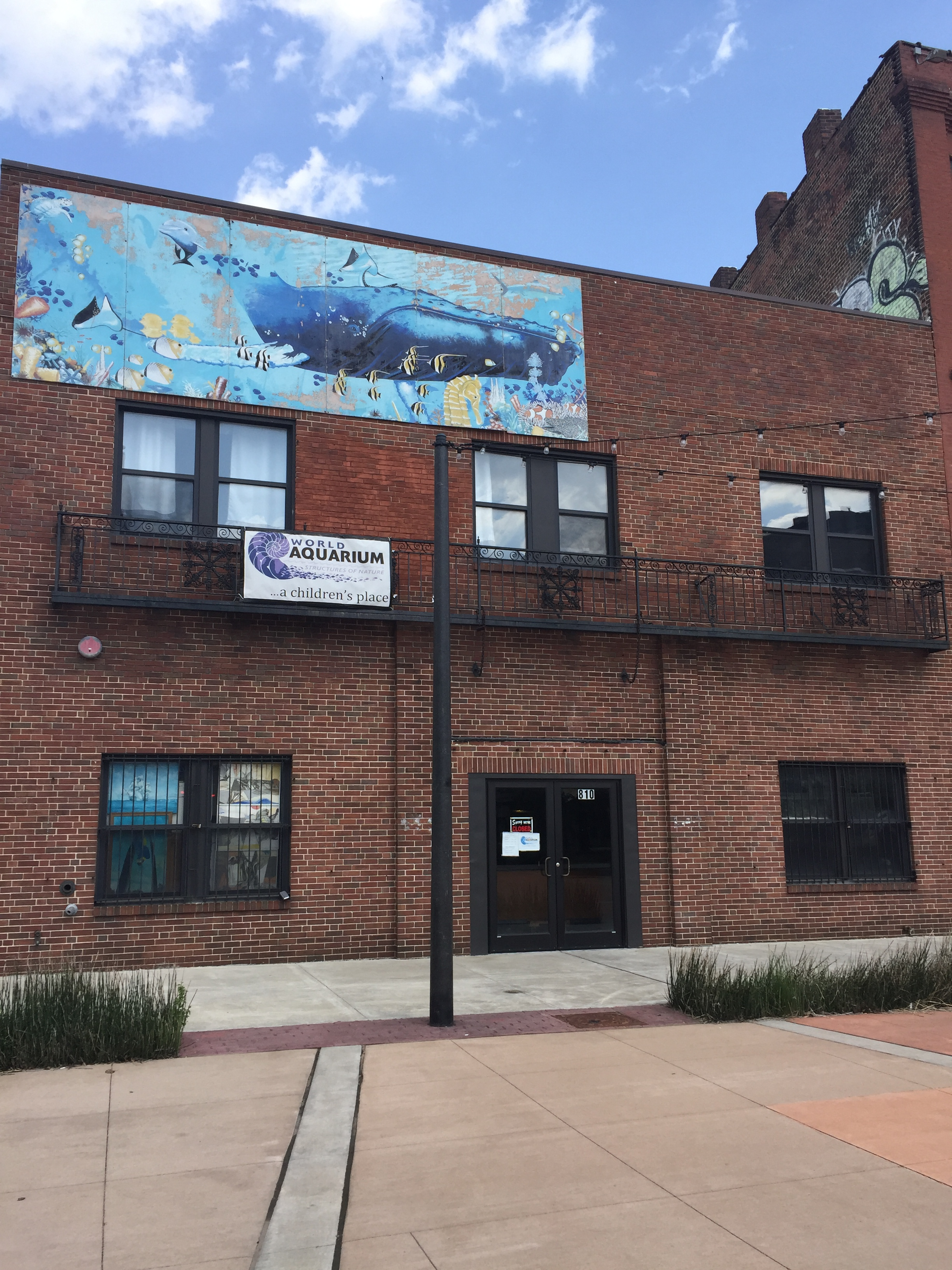
- World Aquarium entrance, May 2018
- Interactive map of World Aquarium
- 38°37′53″N 90°11′07″W
- Date opened: 1971
- Location: 810 N 3rd St., St. Louis, Missouri
- Website: www.childrensaquarium.org

The World Aquarium was an interactive animal exhibition, conservation research center, and animal sanctuary located in Laclede's Landing, St. Louis, Missouri, United States, founded by Leonard Sonnenschein. It closed in mid-2019. Some highlights of the child-centered exhibition are being able to feed and touch many animals. The museum allowed general admission, school tours and behind-the-scenes tours.

The aquarium housed a variety of animals such as sharks, rays, turtles, parrots, marsh turtles, otter, snakes, alligator, crocodile and sloth. The displays were located on multiple levels and in different rooms. One room featured large fish displays, and other areas were designed for interactive, immersive experiences for kids and adults of all ages.

According to the curator, the mission of World Aquarium was to increase the knowledge of aquatic life and environments, to enable people to conserve the world of water, and to provide leadership for the preservation and sustainable use of aquatic resources globally.

The aquarium depended heavily on its volunteers and donations. Some volunteers had been working for five years or more. The aquarium, which had been open since 1993, reopened in a historic building near the Mississippi Riverfront in 2016, after a short hiatus, to allow for a move from its previous location at City Museum. The new location saw success until 2019 in a historic neighborhood of St. Louis, featuring close-by views of the Gateway Arch.

However, in 2019, it was permanently closed.
