= Chatillon–DeMenil House =

- U.S. National Register of Historic Places
- St. Louis Landmark
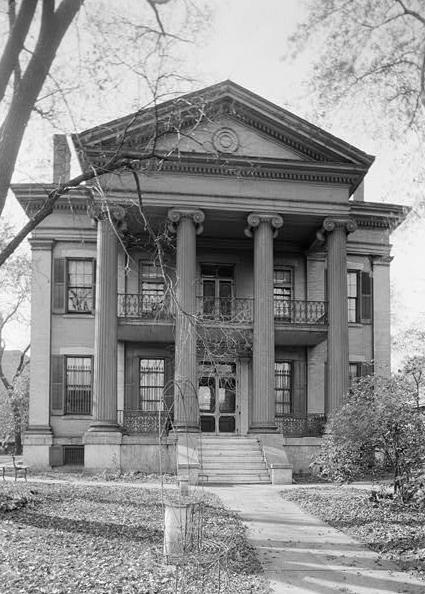
- The Chatillon–DeMenil House in 1936

- Location within Missouri
- Location: 3352 DeMenil Place (13th Street); St. Louis, Missouri
- Coordinates: 38°35′35.91″N 90°12′59.24″W
- Built: 1848-1863
- Architect: Henry Pitcher
- Architectural style: Greek Revival
- NRHP reference No.: 78001673
- Added to NRHP: June 9, 1978

The Chatillon–DeMenil Mansion, located at 3352 DeMenil Place in Benton Park, St. Louis, Missouri, was begun in 1848 for the pioneer Henry Chatillon, then enlarged to its present form by prominent St. Louis businessman Nicolas DeMenil from 1855 to 1863. The house serves as a house museum, and according to its nomination to the National Register of Historic Places, described "as being the finest example of Greek Revival architecture in the Midwest."

== Original home ==
The property where the house was built was part of a five-acre tract purchased by Odile Delor Lux, a granddaughter of Clement Delor de Treget, the founder of Carondelet, Missouri. The property originally was part of the St. Louis common fields. In 1848, Lux married Henry Chatillon, who had become somewhat famous as the leader of the expedition of Francis Parkman in The Oregon Trail. By 1849, a house stood on the property owned by Chatillons. The early house was a simple, two-story brick farmhouse with four rooms and a one-slope roof.

Regardless of Chatillon's renown, parcels of the tract were sold in 1850, and the remainder of the property (including the farmhouse) was sold in 1855. The purchaser was Nicolas DeMenil, a French physician who in October 1836 married Emilie Sophie Chouteau, the descendant of both of the founders of St. Louis. DeMenil and his wife initially purchased the house in 1856 with another family. By the beginning of the Civil War they decided to reside in it year-round, and bought out the interest of the other family. The DeMenils hired Henry Pitcher, a carpenter and contractor, to remodel and expand it in the Greek Revival Style.

The house is surrounded by numerous historic buildings, including the former Lemp and still-operating Anheuser-Busch Breweries; there are other nearby buildings of historic interest, The Lemp Mansion at 3322 Demenil Pl. is located just to the north of the house. It is also located in the Cherokee Street Antique Row.

== Renovations and expansion ==
The house's western side was expanded 12 feet (3.7 m). This addition consisted of three stories, two porches, and possibly the carriage house. Renovations were complete by 1863. However, due to development in the surrounding area (partly financed by DeMenil himself), the view of the river was obstructed from the house, and the front entrance was moved to face 13th Street; balustrades and a porch were added to improve the appearance of the new entrance in 1879. Nicolas DeMenil died shortly after completing the new entrance; his son, Alexander DeMenil, inherited the home and lived in it until his death in 1928. A third generation of DeMenils moved into the home only to find the once bucolic surrounding of the house had become a bustling urban neighborhood, and moved in 1940.

== Paleontology, decline and renovation ==
In 1940, local pharmaceutical manufacturer Lee Hess converted the home into apartments, reserving one for himself and his wife. Hess had purchased the property in part for the extensive system of caves under the property, which he opened as a tourist attraction. Newly christened by Hess as "Cherokee Cave" the caves were open to visitors until the demolition of its entrance underneath present-day Interstate 55. Due to the discovery of the remains of a peccary of the genus Platygonus, the noted paleontologist George Gaylord Simpson proceeded to move into the home, using it as a staging area for investigating the remains of prehistoric animals in the caves. The cave system had once served as the lagering cellars for the nearby Lemp Brewery in the Nineteenth Century.

By the 1950s, the home was becoming derelict, and plans for Interstate 55 called for the demolition of the home. However, a route change in 1961 permitted the home to be saved by the Landmarks Association of St. Louis. The Union Electric Company contributed to the purchase of the home and sponsored its renovation in concert with the Landmarks Association, and the Missouri Department of Transportation agreed to the plan. In summer 1964, renovations began under the authority of architect Gerhardt Kramer, and the home was dedicated the next year. The Landmarks Association created the Chatillon–DeMenil House Foundation as owner of the house, and it continues to operate the home as a museum.
