= City Museum (St. Louis, Missouri) =

Museum in St. Louis, Missouri

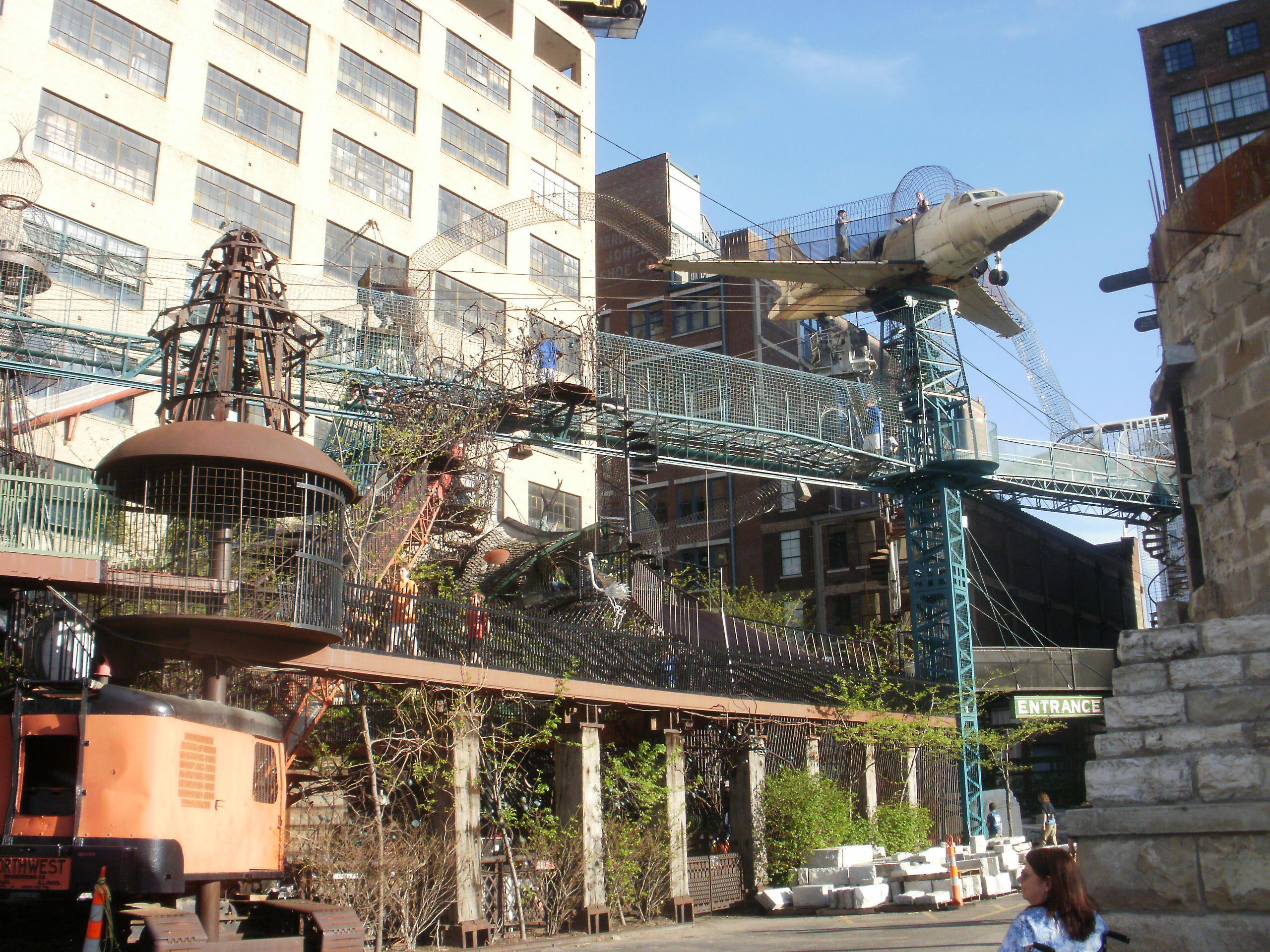
- City Museum outdoor playground
- Established: October 25, 1997
- Location: St. Louis, Missouri
- Coordinates: 38°38′01″N 90°12′02″W
- Type: Private museum
- Owner: Premier Parks, LLC
- Website: www.citymuseum.org

City Museum is a privately owned and operated museum in the Washington Avenue Loft District of St. Louis, Missouri, United States. Its exhibits consist largely of repurposed architectural and industrial objects, housed in the former International Shoe building. It opened in October 1997. The museum was acquired by Premier Parks LLC based in Oklahoma City in January 2019.

The City Museum has been named one of the "great public spaces" by the Project for Public Spaces. In 2025, readers of USA Today ranked it ninth on a list of the country's "Best Immersive Art Experiences" and a runner-up for "Best Children's Museum". It has also been described as "a wild, singular vision of an oddball artistic mind."

== History ==
City Museum was founded by artist Bob Cassilly and his then-wife Gail Cassilly. The museum's building was once an International Shoe Company factory and warehouse but was mostly vacant when the Cassillys bought it in 1993. Construction began almost immediately after the purchase of the building, and was shrouded in secrecy until visitors were first allowed into the museum to see the work in progress on New Year's Eve 1996. With the construction of the iconic giant whale in the lobby completed in 1997, the museum opened to the public on October 25 of the same year. Within two years, it was drawing 300,000 visitors a year. In 2010, it attracted more than 700,000 visitors. Cassilly remained the museum's artistic director until his death in 2011.

The museum has regularly expanded, adding new exhibits such as MonstroCity in 2002, Enchanted Caves and Shoe Shaft in 2003, and World Aquarium in 2004.

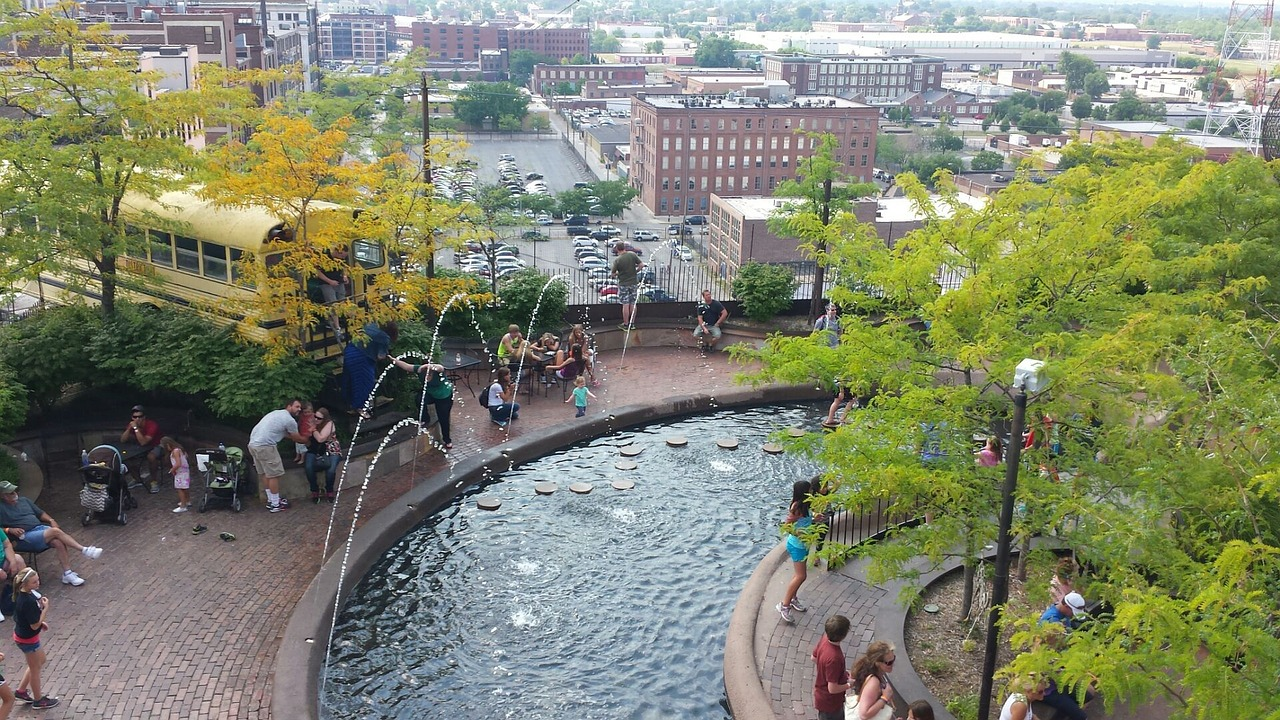
City Museum roof

A circus ring on the third floor offers daily live acts, and the museum has also hosted concerts. It houses The Shoelace Factory, whose antique braiding machines make colorful shoelaces for sale. The building's fifth floor consists of apartments, dubbed the Lofts at City Museum, which range in size from 1,300 to more than 2,800 square feet (260 m^{2}).

The museum was half owned "early on" by David Jump, president of American Milling, a grain-processing company, the New York Times wrote in 2023. Jump bought the rest of the stake after Cassilly died in 2011. In 2019, American Milling sold the museum to Premier Parks, a water and amusement park company in Oklahoma City.

== Main building ==
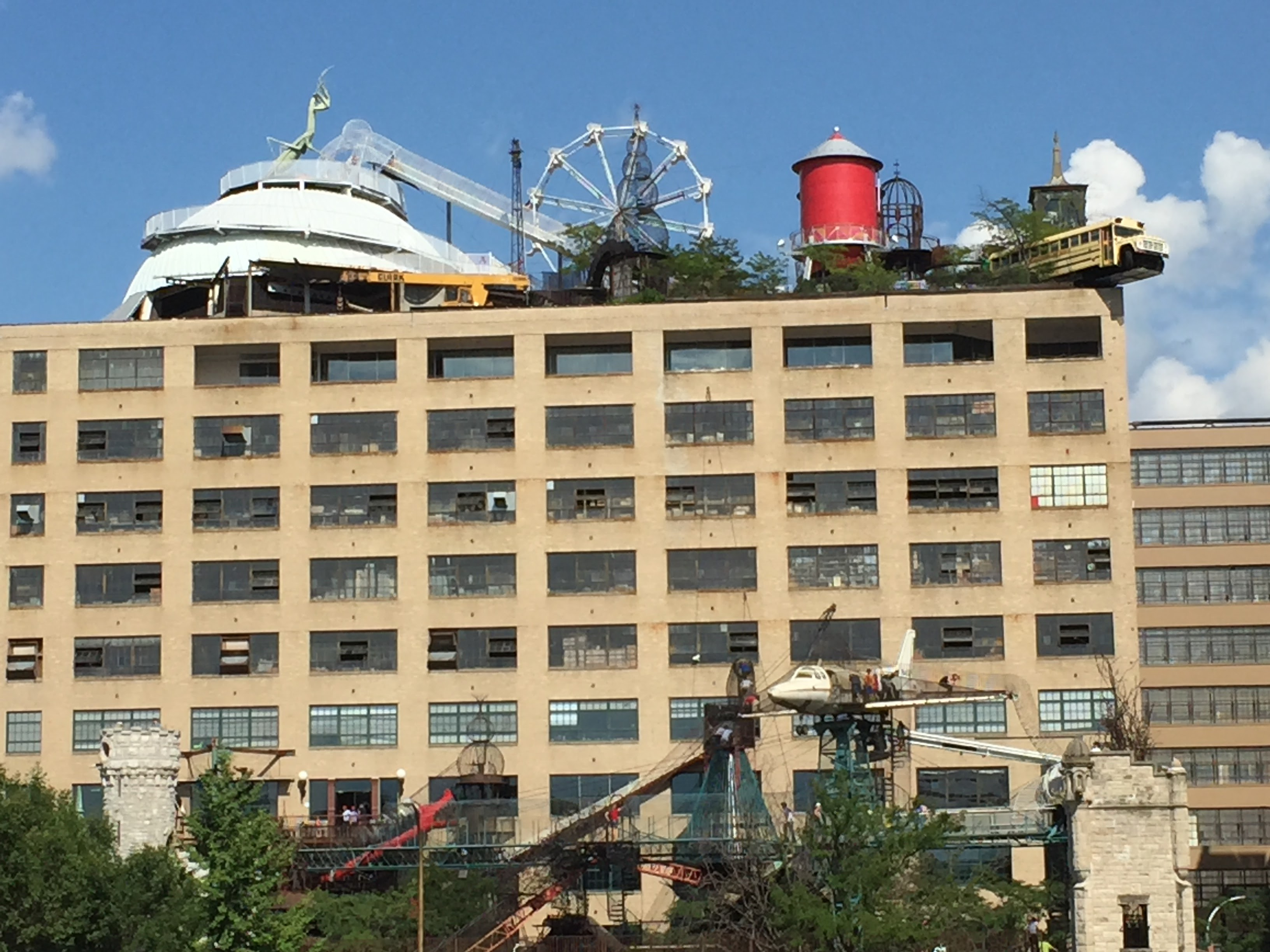
The outside of the City Museum building

=== 1st floor ===
The original part of the museum, the first floor is home to a life-size sculpture of a bowhead whale that guests can walk through to view a large fish tank from the mezzanine. Also on the first floor are a number of tunnels that run across the ceiling, hiding above a sea of aircraft Kevlar cut to give the impression of icicles. To get into these, one can climb up a giant Slinky, which is an old refrigerating coil (donated by Anheuser-Busch), or through a tree house, that now spans all the way to the third floor, which leads into a giant hollowed-out tree and a cabin on the other side of the floor. The floor itself is covered with the largest continuous mosaic in the US, which also runs up the building's supporting. In one area is a tunnel, the "Underground Whaleway", which runs beneath the floor and into the "Original Caves."

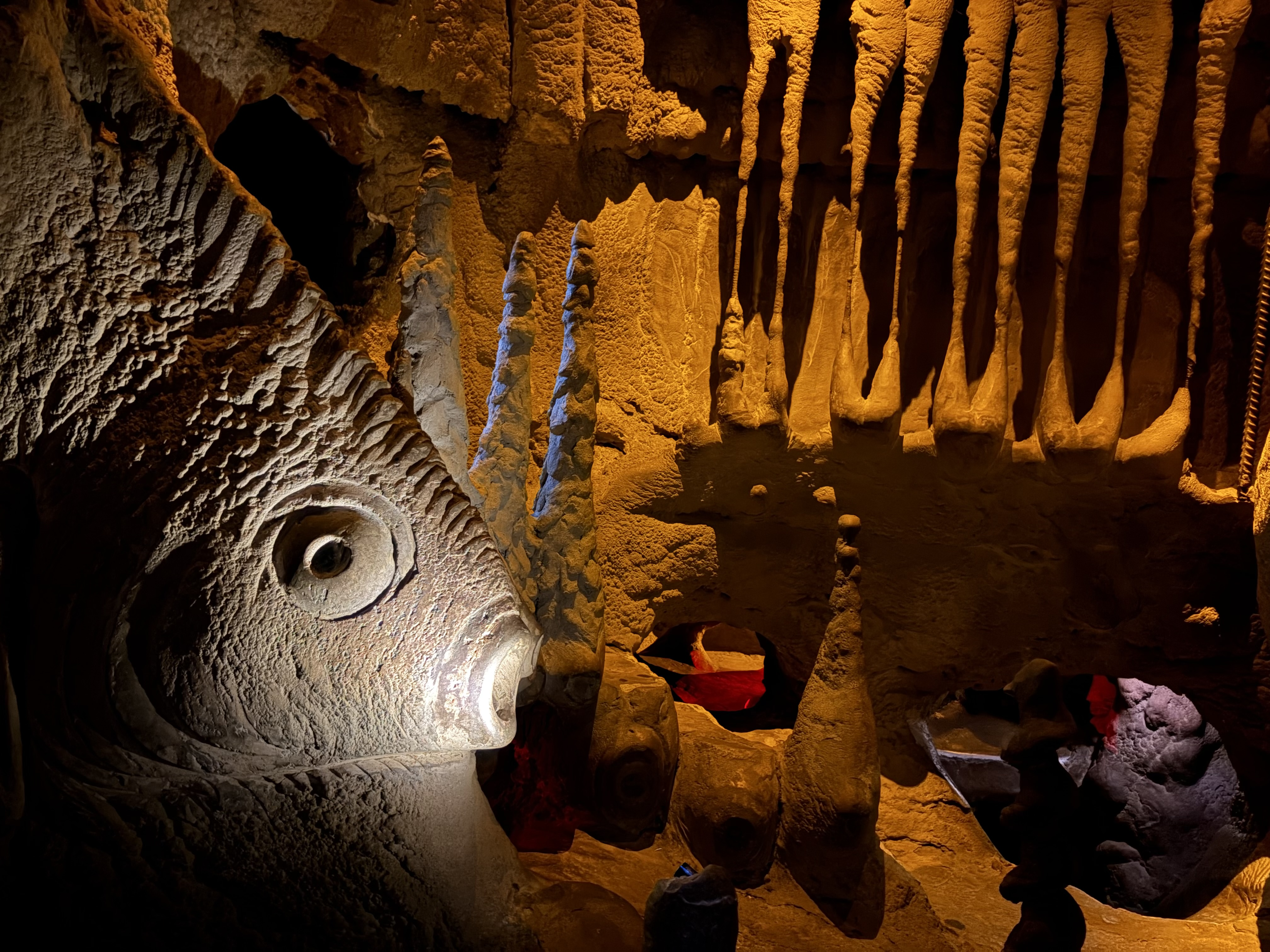
Artificial caves on bottom floor

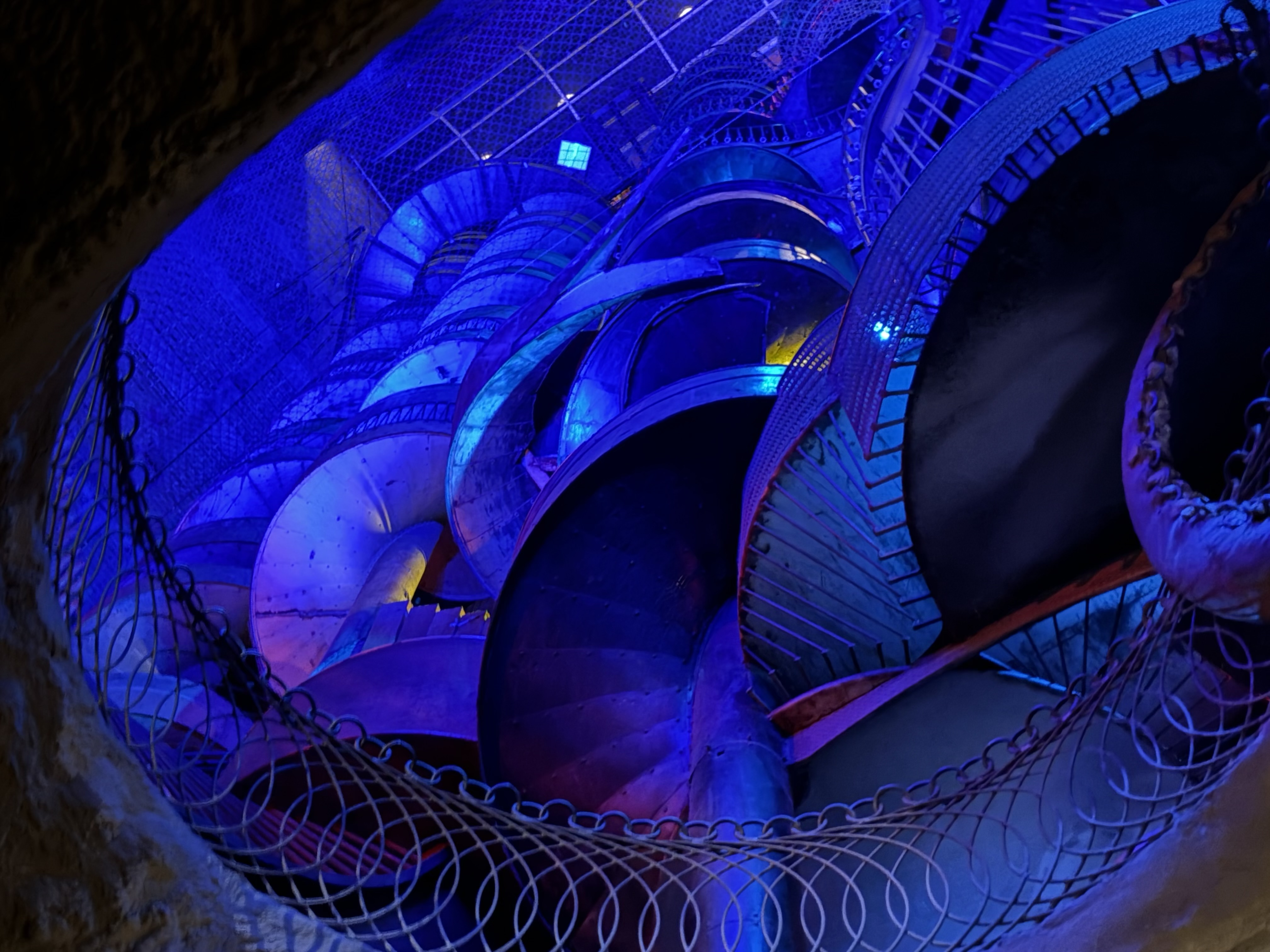
10-story slide viewed from bottom of the cave section

One of the museum's most popular attractions, the Enchanted Caves run through the center of the museum all the way to the 10th floor. Opened in 2003, the Caves are an elaborate system of tunnels hand-sculpted by Bob Cassilly and his crew. In 2007, a 1924 Wurlitzer Pipe Organ from the Rivoli Theater in New York City was added.

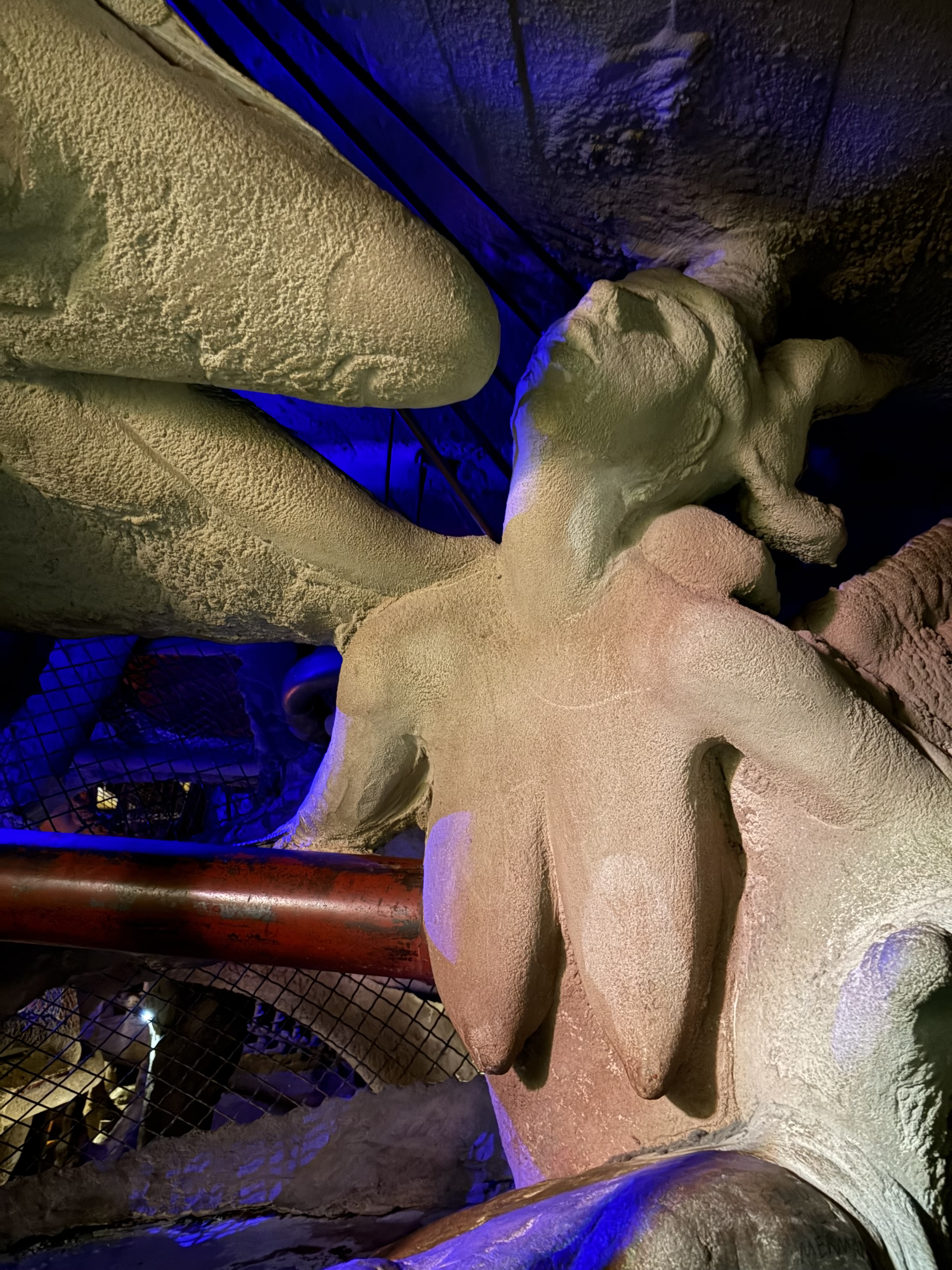
There are several naked lady statues throughout the museum

The Caves also enclose several multistory slides called the Shoe Shafts, developed from structures built for the International Shoe distribution operation. To get the shoes from various floors to the loading dock, staff would place the shoes on spiral shafts. The Shafts opened in 2003 with one three-story spiral slide. Five years later, the museum added a ten-story slide that starts at the roof and leads down to the Caves' entrance. Two other slides have since been added: one 5-story and one 10-story.

=== The Mezzanine ===
The Mezzanine contains the museum's food court.

=== 2nd floor ===
The Vault Room, an 1870s vault from the First National Bank of St. Louis, contains two 3,000-pound vault doors and a hall of mirrors. The room also has a marble bar and about 1,000 safety deposit boxes. Off to the side of the Vault Room and leading to the Enchanted Caves is St. George's Chamber, which holds vintage opera posters and a statue of St. George from the former Saint George's Catholic Church in Chicago. Also on this floor is The Shoelace Factory, featuring shoelace machines from the 1890s, where visitors can order custom-made laces.

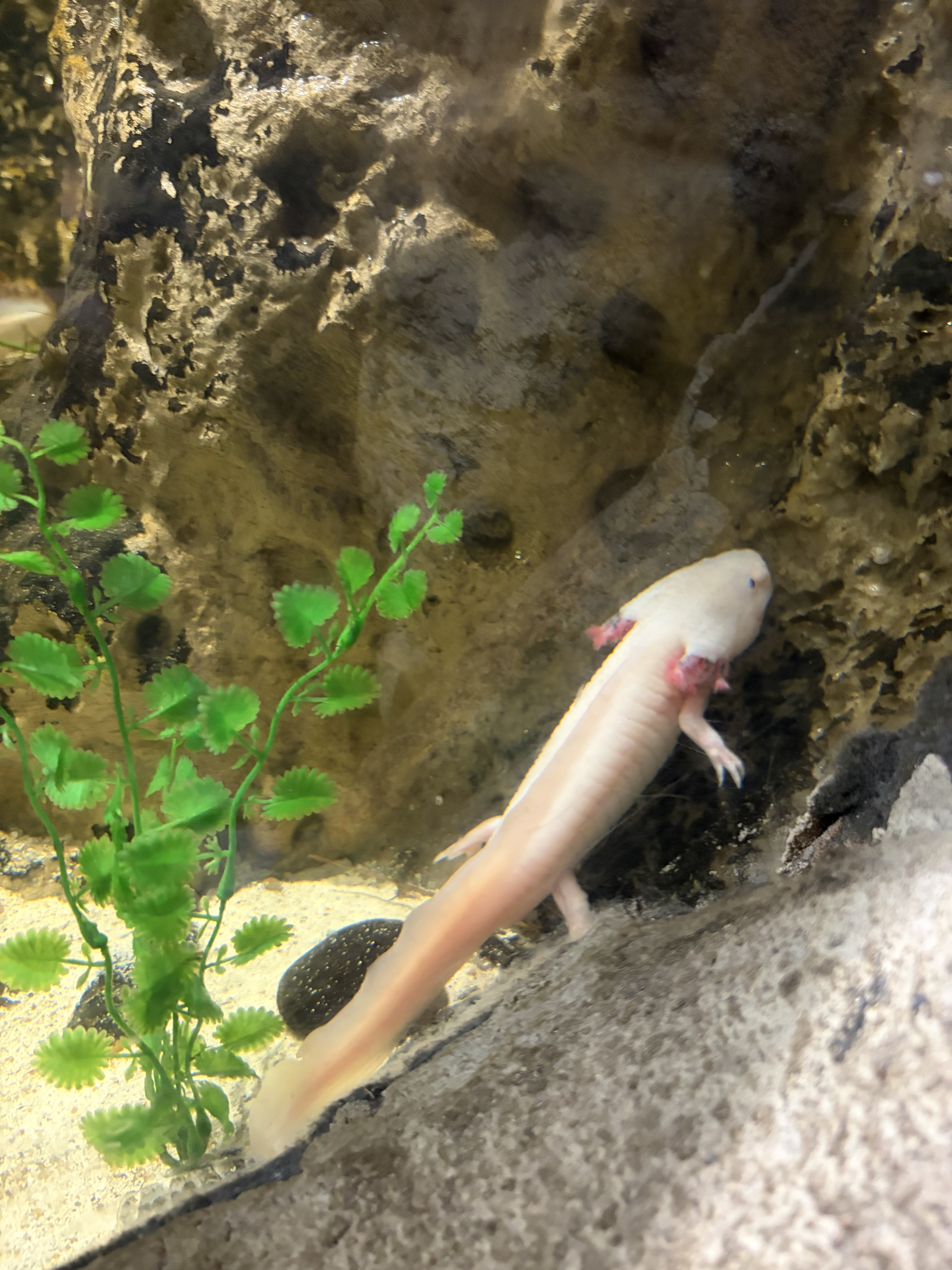
Axolotl in museum aquarium

The World Aquarium was an animal exhibition and rehabilitation center on the second floor. It housed a variety of animals such as sharks, rays, sea turtles, parrots, tortoises, terrapins, otters, snakes, alligators and sloths as well as freshwater and saltwater fish. The World Aquarium portion of the City Museum closed on September 7, 2015, and relocated to Laclede's Landing, St. Louis, before eventually shutting down several years later. The City Museum has since repurposed the aquarium space into the Artquarium.

=== 3rd floor ===
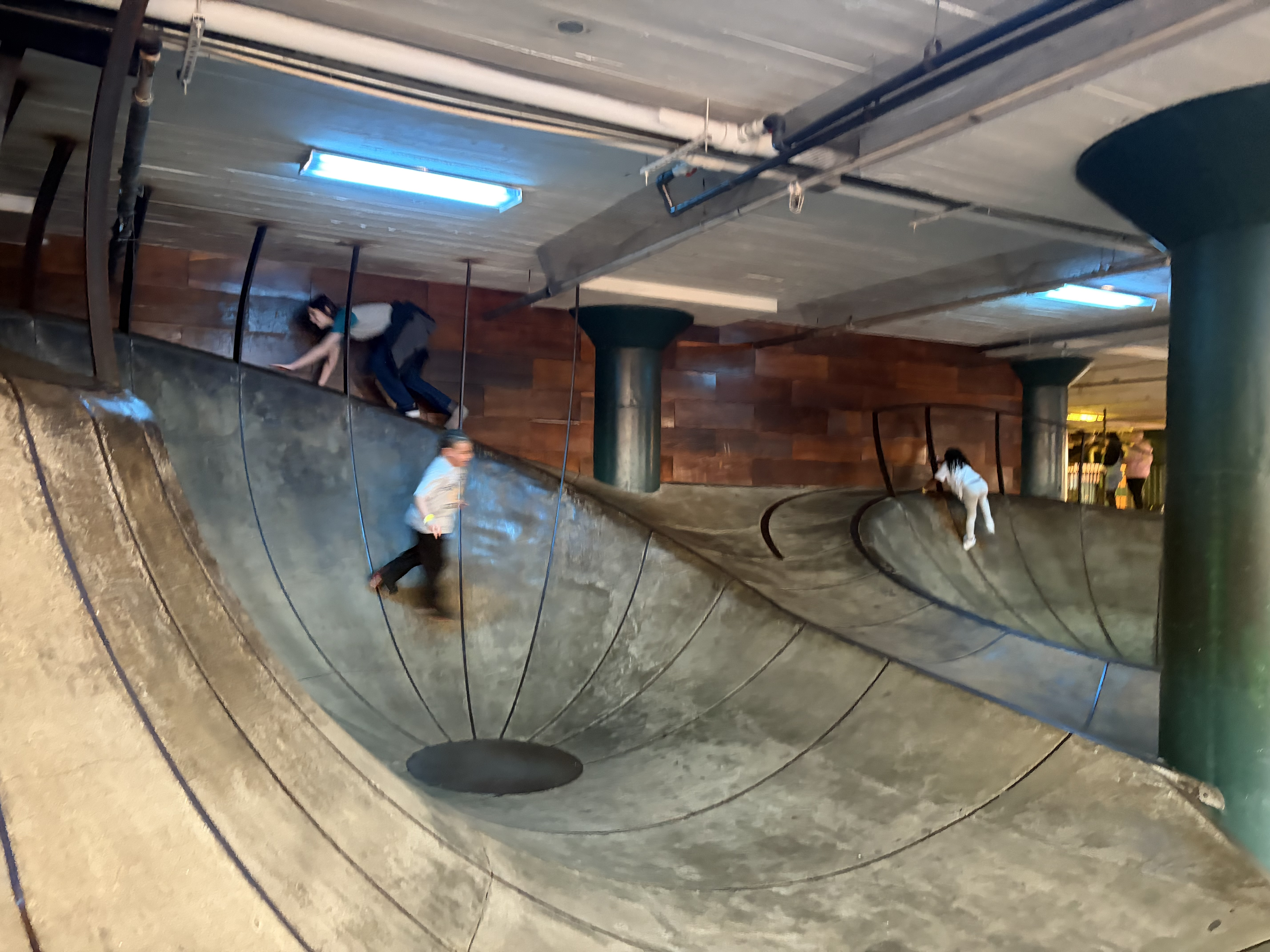
Skateless skatepark

The 3rd Floor is home to a number of attractions. In one area is Skateless Park, which is a collection of skateboard ramps. There is also the Everyday Circus, a circus school for all ages. which performs daily at the museum and does private parties. Just around the corner from the Circus is Toddler Town, a section dedicated to children six years of age and under. Beatnik Bob's is directly across from the Circus, which features the "World's Largest Underwear" (a pair of men's briefs that are about seven feet high and seven feet wide), a collection of vintage video and pinball games, and a concessions stand, bar and coffee shop. Outside Beatnik Bob's is a working 1/8-scale model of an Alco Train that children under 48 inches tall can ride. Past Architectural Hall, the museum's largest rental space, is the Architectural Museum. Off Architectural Hall is the Natural History Section called the Bug Room. On display are a number of insects and taxidermy items. An entrance to a three-story slide leads back to the first floor. The third floor is also home to the world's largest pencil, more than 76 feet in length. Weighing 21,500 pounds, the equivalent of 1.9 million regular No. 2 pencils, it includes 4,000 pounds of graphite and a 250-pound rubber eraser. It was created in 2007 for the 76th birthday of Sri Chinmoy by Ashrita Furman, who donated it to the museum, which installed it in 2009.

=== 4th floor ===
The 4th floor of the museum contains another food court, an entrance into the caves, Art City, and an art gallery. Art City is a place for people of all ages to partake in art and craft projects themselves. The art gallery on the 4th floor has featured artists such as Kaws.

=== The roof ===
The roof has a small old-fashioned Ferris wheel and a wide ramp slide. The pond fountain, which once had stepping stones that connected one side to the other, has now been covered with astroturf with future plans unknown. The rooftop Ferris wheel, installed in 2006, is one of the museum’s most recognizable attractions and offers views of downtown St. Louis. The roof also has a school bus extending past the edge of the building. Visitors can walk into the school bus and open the door from the driver's seat. A 24-foot metal praying mantis stands atop a dome salvaged from the St. Louis Science Center during its remodeling. Cassily and his crew added the fiberglass cover and metal ladders that lead to an exit at the top.

== Outside ==
=== MonstroCity ===
Located in front of the building, MonstroCity features two Sabreliner 40 aircraft fuselages suspended high in the air, a fire engine, a castle turret, a 25-foot (7.6 m) cupola, four-foot-wide Slinkies that can be crawled through, and one very high climbing structure that leads to a slide.

The Cabin Inn is an early-19th-century log cabin located beneath MonstroCity. Originally the home of the son of Daniel Boone, it was owned by the Hezel family for more than a century and is now a bar and entertainment venue.

== Gallery ==
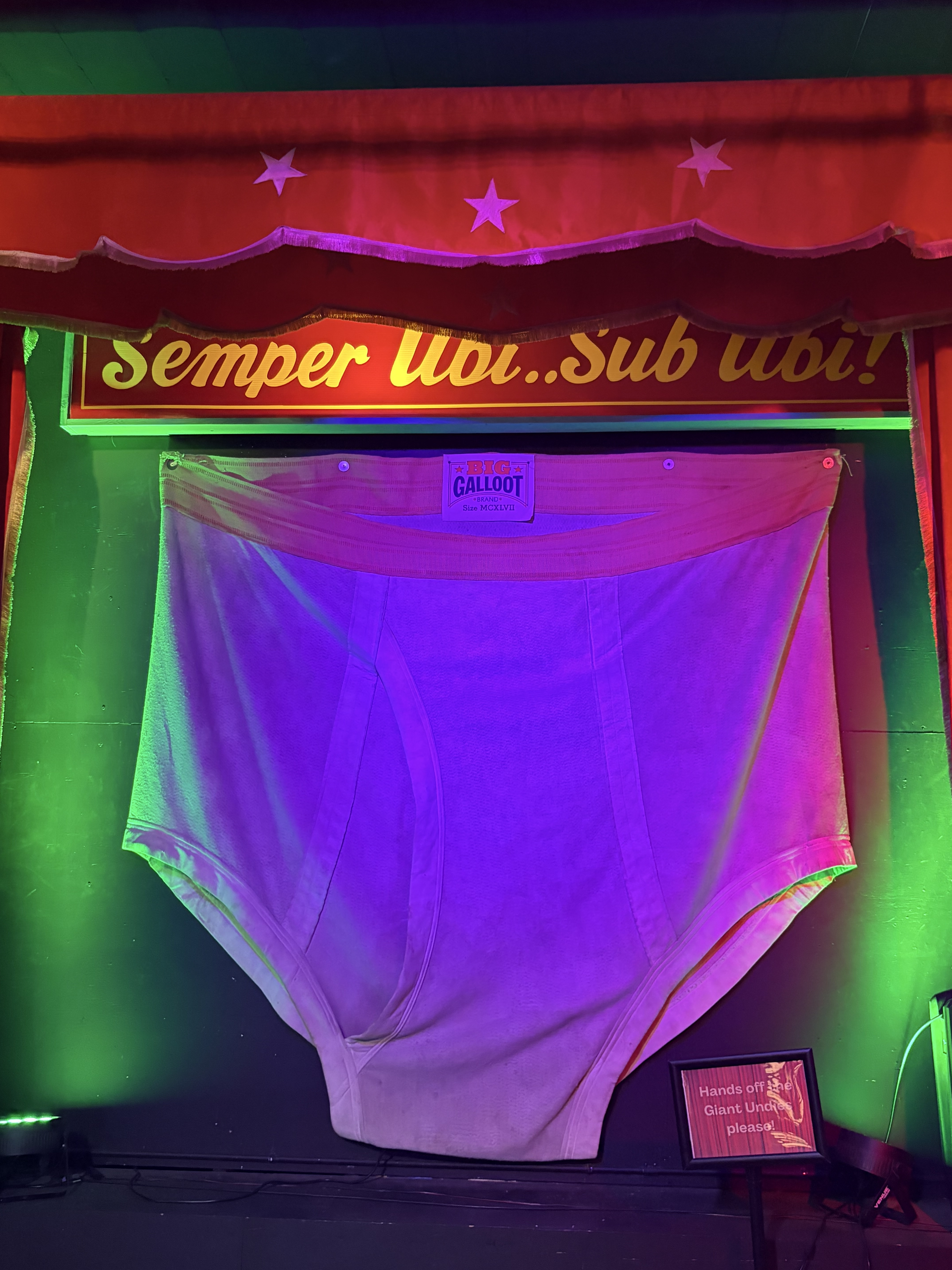
"World’s Largest Underwear"

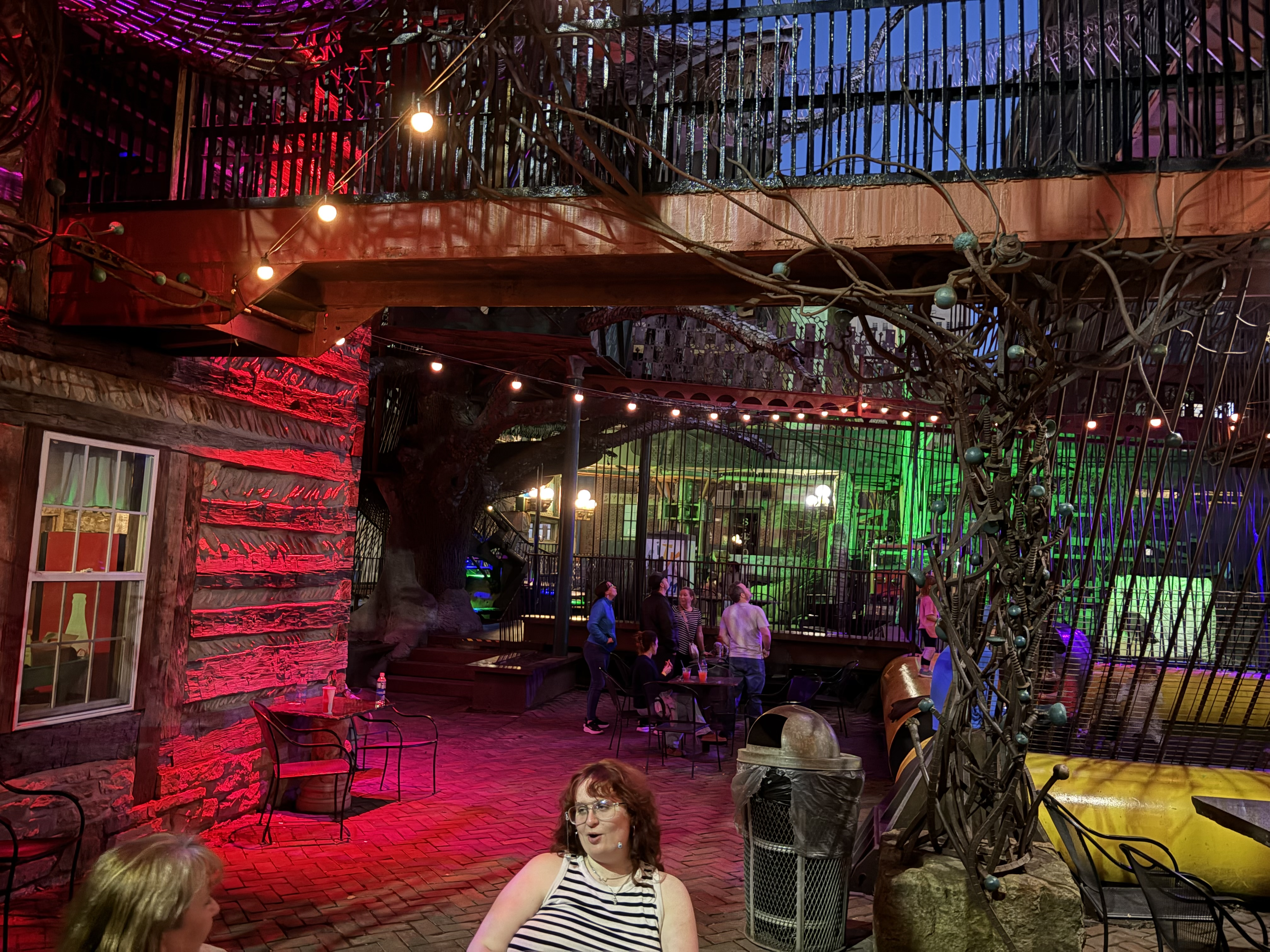
Outside patio
