= Scott Joplin House State Historic Site =

Historic house in St. Louis, Missouri

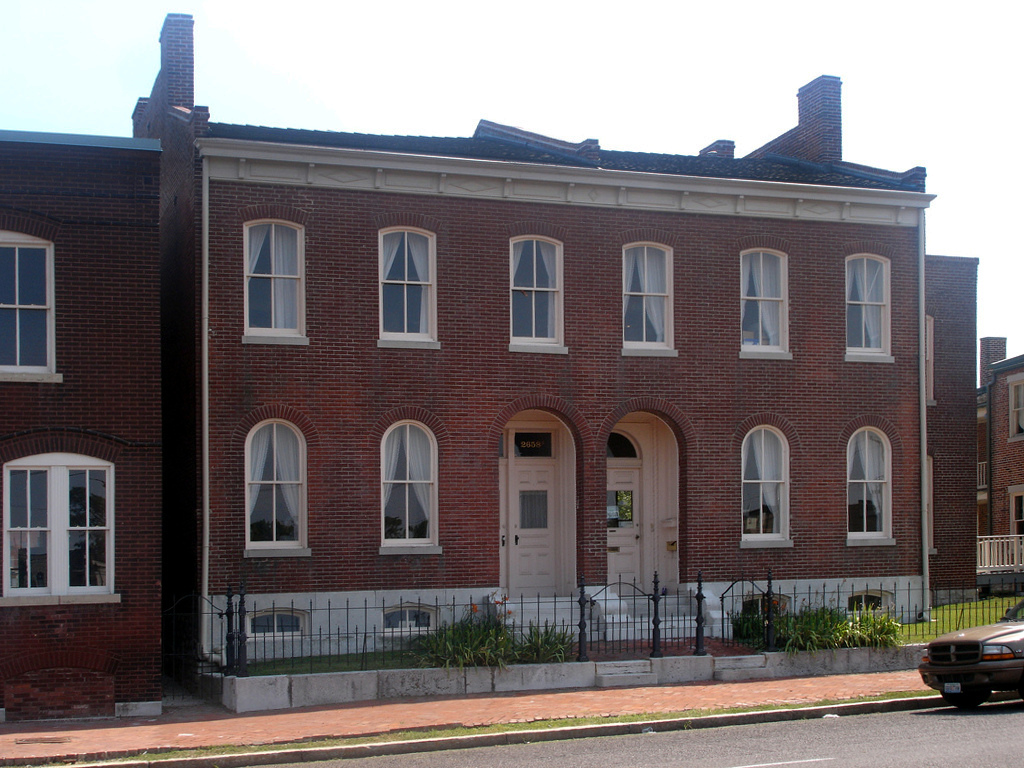

- Location within Missouri Location within the United States
- Location: 2658 Delmar Blvd., St. Louis, Missouri, United States
- Coordinates: 38°38′13″N 90°12′54″W
- Area: 3.9 acres (1.6 ha)
- Established: 1983
- Visitors: 1,170 (in 2022)
- Governing body: Missouri Department of Natural Resources
- Website: https://mostateparks.com/historic-site/scott-joplin-house-state-historic-site]
- Scott Joplin Residence
- U.S. National Register of Historic Places
- U.S. National Historic Landmark
- Built: c. 1860
- Architectural style: Italianate
- NRHP reference No.: 76002235

Significant dates
- Added to NRHP: December 8, 1976
- Designated NHL: December 8, 1976

The Scott Joplin House State Historic Site is located at 2658 Delmar Boulevard in St. Louis, Missouri. It preserves the Scott Joplin Residence, the home of composer Scott Joplin from 1901 to 1903. The house and its surroundings are maintained by the Missouri Department of Natural Resources as a state historic site. The house was added to the National Register of Historic Places and designated a U.S. National Historic Landmark in 1976.

== Description and history ==
The Joplin House is located west of downtown St. Louis, near the southeast corner of Delmar Boulevard and North Beaumont Street. It is a two-story T-shaped brick house, with a gabled roof that has side parapet walls with engaged chimneys. The front facade is six bays wide, and symmetrically arranged, with entrances recessed in arched openings in the center two bays. The ground floor windows are set in round-arch openings, while those on the second floor are set in segmented-arch openings. An ell extends to the rear, and another to the right side. The small parcel on which the house stands has a small grassy area, and is fronted by a granite curb and iron fence.

The exact construction date of the house is not known. Based on its style, it is estimated to have been built around 1860, and is known to have been standing in 1874. It is a typical tenant rowhouse built in the city during this period. It is significant as the only known surviving residence associated with African-American composer Scott Joplin (c. 1867–1917). Joplin lived here from 1900 to 1903. While living here, he wrote what is perhaps his best-known piece, "The Entertainer", which earned new recognition for the composer, 56 years after his death, when it was used as theme music in the 1973 film, The Sting.

The home Joplin rented was recognized as a National Historic Landmark in 1976 and was saved from destruction by the local African American community. In 1983, the Missouri Department of Natural Resources made it the first state historic site in Missouri dedicated to African-American heritage. At first it focused entirely on Joplin and ragtime music, ignoring the urban milieu which shaped his musical compositions. A newer heritage project has expanded coverage to include the more complex social history of black urban migration and the transformation of a multi-ethnic neighborhood to the contemporary community. Part of this diverse narrative now includes coverage of uncomfortable topics of racial oppression, poverty, sanitation, prostitution, and sexually transmitted diseases.

== See also ==
- List of National Historic Landmarks in Missouri
- National Register of Historic Places listings in St. Louis north and west of downtown
- List of music museums
