= Museum of Contemporary Religious Art =

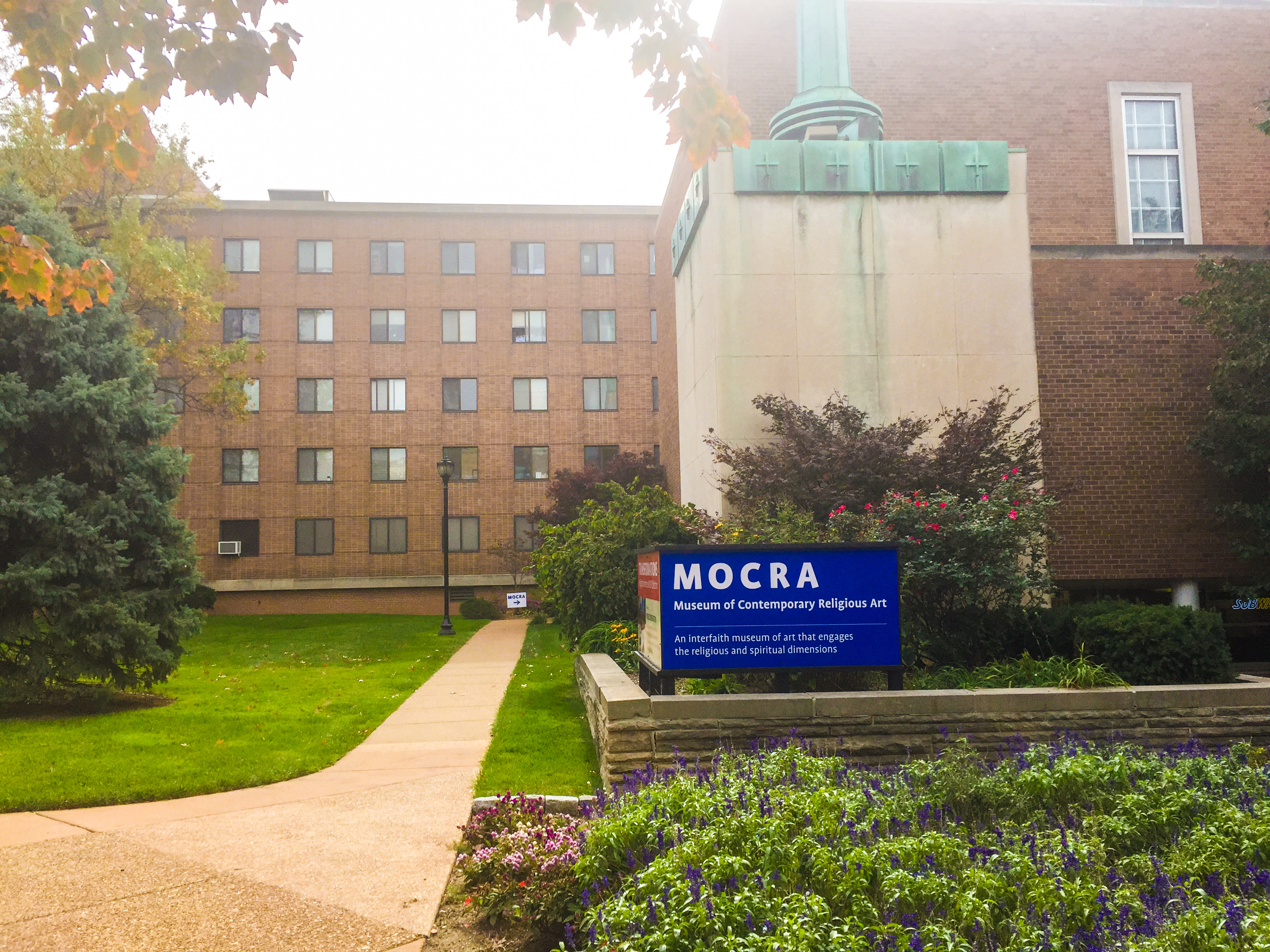
- Museum of Contemporary Religious Art in 2017
- Established: 1993
- Location: St. Louis, Missouri
- Coordinates: 38.6365°N 90.2380°W
- Type: Art museum
- Public transit access: MetroBus
- Website: www.slu.edu/mocra

The Museum of Contemporary Religious Art (MOCRA) was an art museum on the campus of Saint Louis University in St. Louis, Missouri. Founded in 1993, it is the world's first interfaith museum of contemporary art that engages religious and spiritual themes. MOCRA highlights the ongoing dialogue between contemporary artists and the world's faith traditions, as well as the ways visual art can encourage and facilitate interfaith understanding. MOCRA closed permanently on May 31, 2026.

== History ==
MOCRA had its genesis in the doctoral dissertation of Jesuit priest Terrence E. Dempsey, S.J., who studied at the Graduate Theological Union in Berkeley, California, with such noted art historians and theologians as Peter Selz, Jane Daggett Dillenberger, John Dillenberger, and Doug Adams, all pioneers in the study of art and religion. Dempsey's focus was the re-emergence of sacred content in American art of the 1980s. His research brought him into contact with hundreds of artists throughout the U.S., as well as gallery and museum personnel who assisted him in his quest.

In 1990 Dempsey was hired as an assistant professor of art history at Saint Louis University, and as the assistant to Maurice B. McNamee, S.J., founding Director of Samuel Cupples House on the SLU campus. Although Dempsey curated small-scale shows in the Cupples House gallery, he was uncertain of where to go with his ideas and his research. An opportunity arose in 1990, when the Jesuits decided to relocate their house of studies from Fusz Memorial Hall to smaller residences near the Saint Louis University campus. The residential and office spaces in the Fusz complex were quickly earmarked for university use, but no use had been identified for the building's large chapel. Encouraged by McNamee, Dempsey proposed repurposing the space as a museum, and March 20, 1991, then-Saint Louis University President Lawrence Biondi, S.J., formally announced the development of a new interfaith museum of contemporary art.

Renovation of the space began in the spring of 1992, with completion targeted for early September 1992, in time to host a pre-opening conference of the Society for the Arts, Religion and Contemporary Culture (ARC). Despite unexpected hurdles such as the discovery of asbestos in much of the ceiling and the subsequent abatement measures, which extended the renovation until November 4, 1992, the entire inaugural exhibition was installed in time for the opening of the ARC conference on November 7, 1992.

MOCRA opened to the public on February 14, 1993, with the inaugural exhibition Sanctuaries: Recovering the Holy in Contemporary Art, which featured more than 100 works from a wide-ranging roster of 25 artists.

MOCRA closed permanently on May 31, 2026 due to budget cuts.
