= Brian Connelly (painter) =

American painter (c.1926–1963)

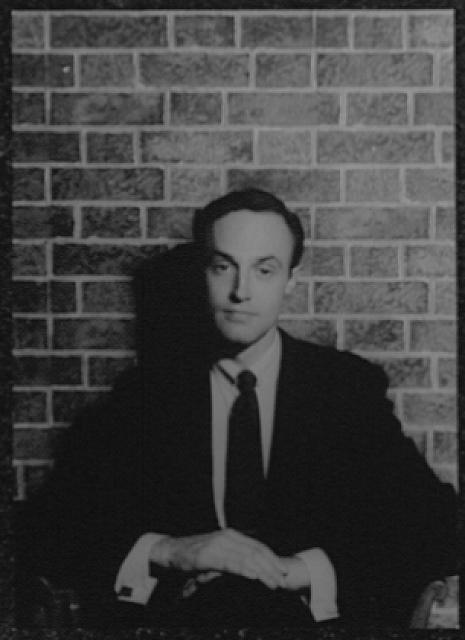
- Connelly in 1954, Van Vechten Collection
- Born: c. 1926; Roseburg, Oregon, United States
- Died: August 13, 1963; Connecticut, United States
- Education: University of Oregon; Art Students League of New York; Parsons School of Design
- Known for: Painting; drawing; textile arts
- Movement: Magical realism, surrealism
- Awards: Popular Prize, Carnegie Institute award, Art Directors Club of New York Award

Brian Connelly (Roseburg, Oregon, 1926 – Connecticut, August 13, 1963) was an American painter, illustrator, and textile designer, known for his mastery of trompe-l'œil and his 15th-century Flemish painting and glazing techniques. His paintings combine elements of surrealism in a style called magical realism.

== Biography ==
=== Early life and education ===
Connelly was born in 1926 to a middle class family in Roseburg, Oregon.

Although considered self-taught, he began his studies in painting at the University of Oregon. In 1946 he moved to New York where he studied briefly at the Art Students League of New York, an institution that focused on academic craftsmanship and also produced many of the leading magical realists of the day. He then moved to Parsons School of Design in New York.

He studied the methods of 15th-century painters and traveled abroad before settling in Connecticut. Between 1949 and 1951 he traveled to Europe and discovered, among other things, the Flemish Renaissance painters. In 1952-1953 Connelly then made a world trip. For a year and a half, he also served in the United States Navy.

Thanks to his commercial illustrations for advertising campaigns and his career as a portrait painter, Connelly built up a network in the art world of New York, Chicago and Los Angeles. In the late 1940s, Connelly became involved with Associated American Artists (AAA), a gallery and organization founded in 1934 by Reeves Lewenthal. The gallery played a major role in the growth of the art industry by connecting American artists and their work with the public to make art more accessible. In addition to Connelly, AAA also represented painters such as Grant Wood.

=== Style and techniques ===
Connelly's painting style has been called "magical realism". The term was popularized in 1943 during the exhibition "American Realists and Magic Realists" at the Museum of Modern Art in New York.

Connelly's style is often compared to surrealism, but while surrealism focuses on the life of the mind, Connelly's magic realism is rooted in the real world and depicts fantastical elements as part of everyday life. The mystical, sometimes humorous, elements in his works add to their mystery and invite the viewer to look closer. Throughout his career, Connelly explored the surrealist tradition with an added layer of technical precision that placed him in the same league as earlier American artists in the genre, such as Paul Cadmus (1904–1999) and Peter Blume (1906–1992).

Connelly was a technical virtuoso in tempera-illusionist painting, showing meticulous detail in his rendering of objects. He was highly regarded for his attention to detail and the way he played with perception, blurring the lines between reality and illusion. His works often featured hyperrealistic representations, inviting the viewer to reconsider the nature of what they saw. Connelly viewed the everyday through a hyperrealistic and often mysterious lens.

He always signed his works BRIAN in block letters and indicated on his works the year of creation in Roman numerals.

=== Works ===
Connelly experimented with painting, drawing, and textile art. He painted primarily in oil paint, tempera, and casein paint with oil glaze, on panel and masonite. Some of his works were executed on paper or canvas. He also made a number of watercolors. His oeuvre includes imaginative, illusionistic landscapes, works featuring Tiffany glass, Trompe-l'oeil still lifes of, among other things, sunflowers and various types of fruit, as well as portraits of friends. Connelly was a passionate gardener and grew exotic plants as a hobby. He let the plants play a role in some of his paintings. Connelly stated that if you can paint one leaf, you can paint the world.

Connely's works can be found in the collections of many American museums such as the Art Institute of Chicago, the Metropolitan Museum of Art, in New York, and Cooper Hewitt, Smithsonian Design Museum in New York.

==== Commercial Commissions ====
In the period 1952–1954, Connelly gained wider recognition as a commercial illustrator. In the early 1950s, he was commissioned by Associated American Artists (AAA) to paint advertisements for De Beers Diamonds, one of the largest diamond producers in the world. These advertisements introduced the paintings Wedding Day (1952), Day to Remember (1952), Memory of Love (1953), Lifetime of Love (1953), Garden of Dreams (1953), and Song of Love (1954) to a wider audience.

His illustrations earned him an award from the Art Directors Club of New York. This commercial success also resulted in commissions from Fortune, interior and garden magazines (such as House Beautiful and House and Garden), and the Bromeliad Society Bulletin, a journal about botanical plants. In August 1952, Connelly made the front cover of the special edition "Canada, the Businessman's Country" of Fortune. The painting was a realistic depiction of a maple leaf. Since the Fortune issue was about Canada, Connelly chose a maple leaf, the national symbol of Canada, as his subject.

==== Illusionistic works ====
The core of his oeuvre concerns his illusionistic and tromp l'oeil paintings. His best-known works include: Tiffany Landscape (1950), Attraction (1951), Spectrum (1952), Golf Magic (1953), A Night Garden (1956) and The Gates of Paradise (1960).

Tiffany Landscape (1950)

Connelly was a great collector of Tiffany Glass. The transparent and reflective properties of the glass intrigued the painter. Tiffany glass was also a source of inspiration for certain paintings by Connelly, such as the painting Tiffany Landscape from 1950, in which he depicted a park in which classic trees alternate with Tiffany lamps, such as a 'Wisteria' Table Lamp (with blue and green leaves), the Magnolia Tiffany floor lamp and a peony Tiffany pendant lamp (with red, orange, yellow and green tones), which take the form of trees.

Attraction (1950)

A modest revival of trompe l'oeil painting occurred in the early 1950s. In addition to Peter Blume's Crucifixion, Brian Connelly attracted attention with his work Attraction from 1950. This dark trompe l'oeil painting shows a broken window with wormholes and all kinds of insects, including flies and butterflies. This work on panel, with oil paint and tempera, belongs to the collection of the Art Institute of Chicago.

Attraction was included in several exhibitions at the Art Institute (1951 and 1959-1960) and was also shown in Springfield Illinois (1953), the Dallas Museum of Art (1953), the Santa Barbara Museum of Art (1954), and Lake Forest College in Illinois (1957).

Spectrum (1952)

In 1952, Connelly became the youngest artist to win the Audience Award at the Pittsburgh International Exhibition of Contemporary Painting for the painting "Spectrum". This four-part, sixteen-panel painting of a Renaissancehospice in Bonn, Germany, unfolds to show the same scene in four different color palettes, as if evoking changing daylight or seasons: a yellow spring, the red-orange heat of summer, the cool blue of autumn, and a gray winterdawn.

With Spectrum, Connelly captured the cracks in everyday reality, where the ordinary, if only for a moment, is transformed into something extraordinary, too fantastic to be real. At the same time, Connelly attempted to synthesize historical artistic principles with the concerns of avant-garde modernism. This kinetic polyptych, with its patented hinged panels, explores color and human vision, much like the color field paintings of Barnett Newman and Mark Rothko, which also emerged in the same years. The work is part of the collection of the Southern Alleghenies Museum of Art in Loretto, Pennsylvania.

Golf Magic (1953)

Commissioned by the Associated American Artists (AAA) gallery, Connelly designed several textile artworks in the early 1950s: the kitchen apron "Golf Magic" and "Marbles." Grant Wood and Anton Refregier were other painters whose designs were used.

In 1952, AAA entered into joint ventures with textile and ceramic manufacturers to create "modern" household items. Between 1952 and 1957, AAA expanded their merchandising theories to include designing fabrics for both the clothing and home furnishings markets. These fabrics, most of which were signed and dated, were praised upon their introduction in newspaper articles and clothing magazines—both for the general public and for the trade. Golf Magic was designed by Connelly in 1953 for the "Signature Fabrics" collection of AAA, which produced the screen-printed textiles. It was worn by Jerry Stiller as Wilbur Turnblad in the original John Waters film 'Hairspray' (1988).

The "trompe-l'oeil" design of Golf Magic featured a motif of realistically depicted golf balls with sharp shadows on a bright yellow background. A variation with a bright red background also appeared in 1953. With the graphic motif of the same golf ball, seemingly repeated endlessly, Connelly referenced ideas about mass production, consumerism, and popular culture. "Golf Magic" evoked the key features of pop art.

Connely's "Golf Magic" helped to represent the beginning of pop art in America, the American obsession with pop culture that began in the 1950s, and also American magical realism. The textile was not only a designed art object, but also a consumer good. Moreover, the medium, screen printing, was a printing method that allowed for rapid reproduction, which allowed for a large print run of the product. The production of the object was based on the premise that the artwork should be available to the general public. American magical realism, on the other hand, is described as a reaction to European surrealism, in which subjects are depicted realistically but also imaginatively.

In the case of Golf Magic, the eye cannot distinguish whether the golf ball is lying on the yellow background, casting a shadow, or whether it is floating above it. This sensation creates the optical illusion that the ball is constantly moving. Also significant is the title Connelly gave to the object, "Golf Magic", which was not only self-referential, but also alluded to the "Magic Realism" movement. In the 1950s, the American middle class could purchase these vibrant textiles and related items at grocery stores, including Macy's. The American Textile History Museum has more than forty fabrics by Associated American Artists, including Golf Magic.

A copy of Golf Magic is also in the collection of the Smithsonian Design Museum.

A Night Garden (1955)

In the painting A Night Garden, part of "The Jason Schoen Collection," Connelly invites the viewer into his home studio and shows us a picture of himself working on this painting. The details are meticulously crafted, down to the specks of color in the tiny petals. It is meticulously detailed, finely glazed, and atmospherically deep. The small, reflective moment at the center of the painting recalls a similarly intimate moment in Jan van Eyck's Portrait of Giovanni Arnolfini and his Wife from 1434.

In February 1956, a special issue of Art in America called him a promising "new talent."

"A Night Garden" is one of the artworks created by Connelly that illustrates his artistic approach and manifesto at this stage of his life. This painting was painted after his retrospective in 1962. It presents the contrast between geometric modernist designs inside the interior of the house with the exterior setting of the garden in the artwork. The painting contains a silver vessel at its center and has themes relating to personal identity and creative space.

The Gates of Paradise (1960)

Brian Connelly's 1960 painting The Gates of Paradise depicts Catholic saints and the Archangel Michael realistically in a traditional yet modern setting, overlooking and intervening in an earthly landscape of our time. The modern models for the individual saints were all friends of the artist, including his business partner and manager James Coats (as St. Anthony) – and the artist's self-portrait in the lower right corner (as the painting saint).

==== Portraits ====
Connelly frequently painted portraits on commission from collectors and friends. One of his first portraits is a "tromp d'oeil" self-portrait from 1951.

In 1955, Connelly made a portrait painting of the American gallery owner and curator Ala Story (1907–1972), former director of the Santa Barbara Museum of Art.

In 1956, he portrayed British novelist David Stuart Horner (1900–1983), with whom he had a relationship in the early 1950s. A photographer friend, Carl Van Vechten photographed Connelly posing for his portrait painting of Horner.

That same year, he immortalized textile designer Dorothy Wright Liebes (1897–1972), the "mother of modern weaving," on masonite.

Connelly cast himself in several paintings. Connelly's nocturnal garden scene features the artist's self-portrait in the reflection of a silver globe.

==== Tromp l'oeil still lifes ====
There are several still lifes known by the painter that he made at the end of his life.

The collection of the Metropolitan Museum of Art in New York has two "tromp l'oeil" watercolors: Brown and White Eggs (1962) and Delicious Apples (1962). The watercolor Grapes, a still life with grapes, dates from the same year.

== Exhibitions (selection) ==
His paintings were shown in more than 25 exhibitions between 1950 and 1962 — from his solo debut in November 1950 at the American British Art Gallery in New York, to what would have been a mid-career retrospective at the Banfer Gallery in Manhattan in the winter of 1962, had he not died the following year.

Connely's 1962 retrospective, organized by Banfer Gallery, was a success. In addition to Connelly, Banfer Gallery represented such painters as Ernst Fuchs, Alex Colville, Maurice Grosser, Billy Morrow Jackson, Thomas Locker, and Charles Rain.

The Banfer Gallery guestbook for Connelly's retrospective was signed by writer and photographer Carl Van Vechten, his longtime friend, magical realists John Koch and Charles Rain, and illustrator Hilary Knight. After his death, Connelly's work was exhibited regularly.

=== Period 1950-1962 ===
- 2–18 November 1950: Solo exhibition American-British Art Center in New York, Yale University in Connecticut;
- 1951: Solo exhibition American-British Art Center, Yale University, Connecticut
- October 25 – December 16, 1951: Art Institute of Chicago, Sixtieth Annual American Exhibition of Paintings and Sculpture;
- 1952: Pittsburgh International Art Show;
- January 17, 1953 – May 25, 1953: Springfield Illinois Art Association, Circuit Exhibition, Springfield Illinois;
- October 10–25, 1953: Dallas Museum of Art, State Fair of Texas Art Exhibition Trompe l'Oeil Paintings That Fool the Eye by Masters from Vermeer to Dali
- May 25 – October 16, 1954: Santa Barbara Museum of Art, California, Museum of Fine Arts, exhibition
- June 3 – August 5, 1956: "New Accessions USA" Exhibition, Colorado Springs Fine Arts Center;
- June 9–27, 1957: Lake Forest College, 100th Anniversary of Lake Forest Collegen No. 37
- October 1, 1959 – January 10, 1960: Art Institute of Chicago, Two Centuries of American Art, 1750–1950
- November 1962: Retrospective exhibition at the Banfer Gallery, 23 East 67th Street, New York.

=== Other exhibitions ===
- 2016: A Night Garden (1955), exhibited during the exposition "Surrealism, Magic Realism & Inspired Works" by Debra Force Fine Art, New York;
- 2021: "Extra Ordinary: Magic, Mystery and Imagination in American Realism", The Georgia Museum of Art at the University of Georgia with works by Connelly, including "A Night Garden" from 1955.

== Awards ==
- Popular Prize (1952), Carnegie Institute award, Carnegie Institute of Technology for the painting "The Spectrum, a painting in four acts"
- Paintings Award, Art Directors Club of New York

== Selected works ==
- Tiffany Landscape, 1950 (71 x 56 cm) - oil on hardboard
- Attraction, 1950 (50.8 × 61 cm) - Oil and tempera on panel - insects on a screen
- Still Life of a Sunflower (40 x 30 cm) - trompe l'oeil painting * Variation on Venus (Nude figure behind a door) * The Astonished Anatomist - the anatomy of a female head (surrealist work)
- Self-portrait, 1951 * The Spectrum, 1952 (94 x 105 cm) - casein and oil on hardboard * Rosa Gallica, 1952 (50 x 30 cm) * Your Move (Chessboard and checkers)
- Golf Magic, 1953 - allover trompe l'oeil pattern of golf balls and their shadows
- Portrait of Ala Story, 1954 (casein on panel; 42 x 30 cm; 16.5 in. x 12 in.), National Portrait Gallery, Washington, DC
- A Celebration of Bromeliaceae, 1954 (painting with greenhouse as central theme)
- A Night Garden, 1955 (oil and casein on panel; 45 x 76 cm; 18 x 30 inches)
- Dorothy Wright Liebes, 1956 (oil on masonite; 45.3 x 35.5 cm (17 13/16 x 14")
- Gates of Paradise, 1960

== Museums and public collections ==
- Art Institute of Chicago, Chicago;
- Metropolitan Museum, New York;
- Everson Museum of Art, Syracuse, New York;
- National Portrait Gallery, Washington, D.C.;
- Sheldon Museum of Art, Lincoln, Nebraska;
- Southern Alleghenies Museum of Art, Loretto, Pennsylvania;
- The Jason Shoen Collection;
- Marianna Kistler Beach Museum of Art, Kansas State University, Kansas
- American Textile History Museum, North Andover, Massachusetts
- Cooper Hewitt, Smithsonian Design Museum, Andrew Carnegie Mansion, Manhattan, New York City

== Coats-Connelly Collection ==
Connelly was an avid collector of Tiffany Glass. This type of glass was invented by Louis Comfort Tiffany, the son of jewelry manufacturer Charles Lewis Tiffany, founder of Tiffany & Co. It is characterized by its luxurious, opalescent hues, which are distinct from earlier, hand-painted forms of iridescent glass.

The many and varied types of glass developed and produced at Tiffany Studios in New York from 1878 to 1929-1930 were avidly collected by Connelly and his business partner James Coats. Coats and Connelly were art and antique dealers in Connecticut and the United Kingdom, where Coats was a war veteran who protected the royal family during World War II. It resulted in the "James Coats and Brian Connelly Collection," consisting of 76 pieces of Tiffany glass, including red, paperweight, lava, and floriform examples. Some of the pieces were intended for the personal collection of their maker, Louis Comfort Tiffany (1848–1933). The Tiffany glass collection was dissolved on October 21, 1966, after Connelly's death. auctioned.

== Personal life ==
In a 1952 article in American Artists, Connelly reflected on his opportunities as an artist, saying, "Painting is a truly wonderful life. I could not imagine life without painting, and it is a constant miracle for me to make a living doing what I love most." He lived mainly in Wilton, Connecticut, but also for a time in New York. Connelly was unmarried and had no children.

In the early 1950s, Connelly became friends with the British crime novelist David Stuart Horner (1900–1983). Horner had been the lover and companion of the writer Osbert Sitwell (1892–1969) for most of his life. Horner and Sitwell drifted apart as Sitwell's health, which had been affected by Parkinson's disease, deteriorated., Horner found solace in the young Connelly and in all serenity they had an affair for a time. In 1953, Connelly sealed his relationship with Horner with a portrait of Horner.

Connelly himself suffered for many years from chronic nephritis, an inflammation of the kidneys. The disease was ultimately fatal.

On 13 August 1963, Connelly died at the height of his career at the age of just 37 at his home in Connecticut. He was survived by his mother, Mrs. H. L. Connelly, and sister, Mrs. Statnton O. Marsland na.
