= Culture of St. Louis =

The culture of St. Louis, Missouri includes a variety of attractions located within the city of St. Louis, Missouri, and in surrounding communities in Greater St. Louis, such as local museums, attractions, music, performing arts venues, and places of worship.

== Museums and attractions ==
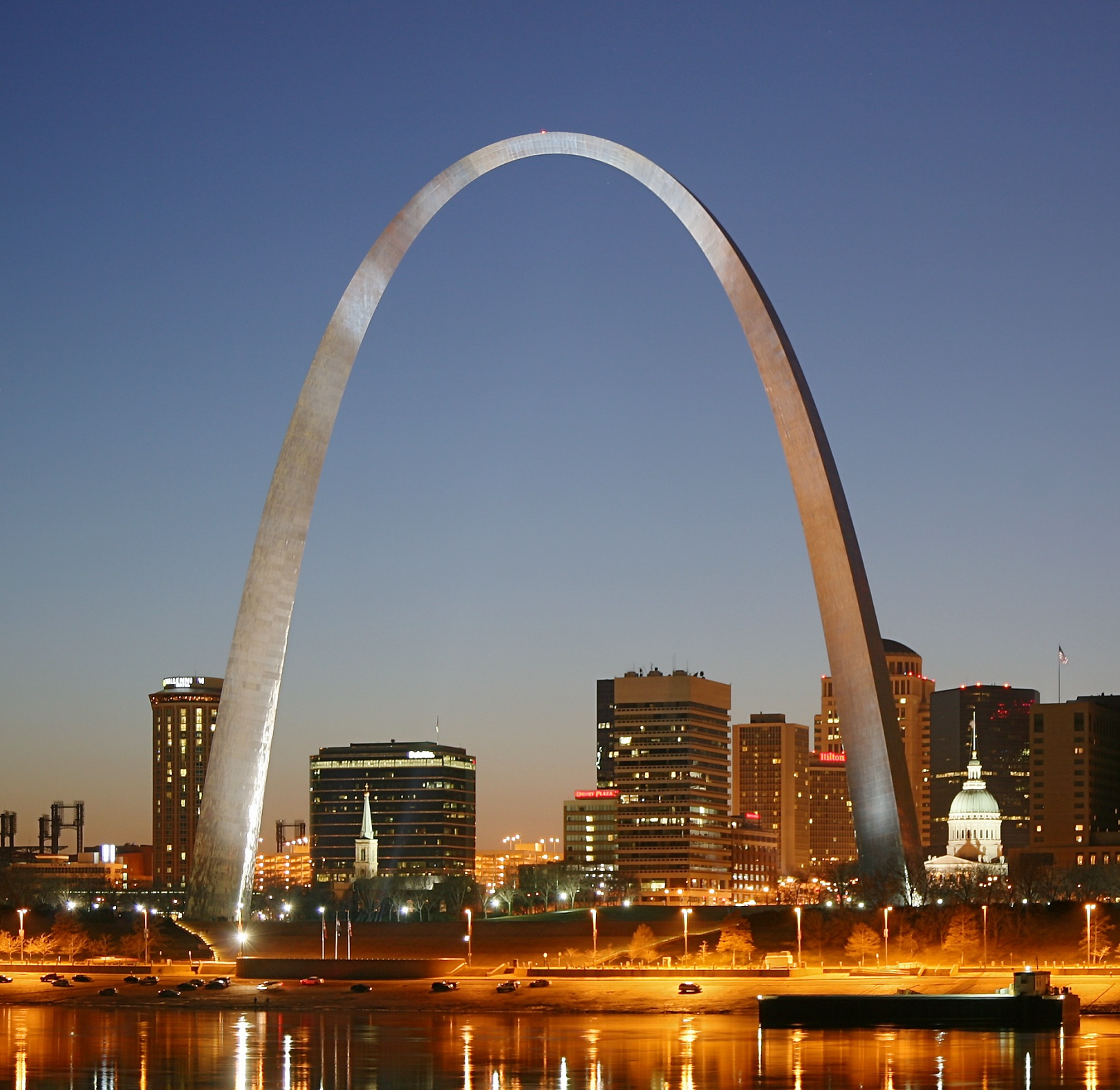
The Gateway Arch, tourist attraction and icon of St. Louis

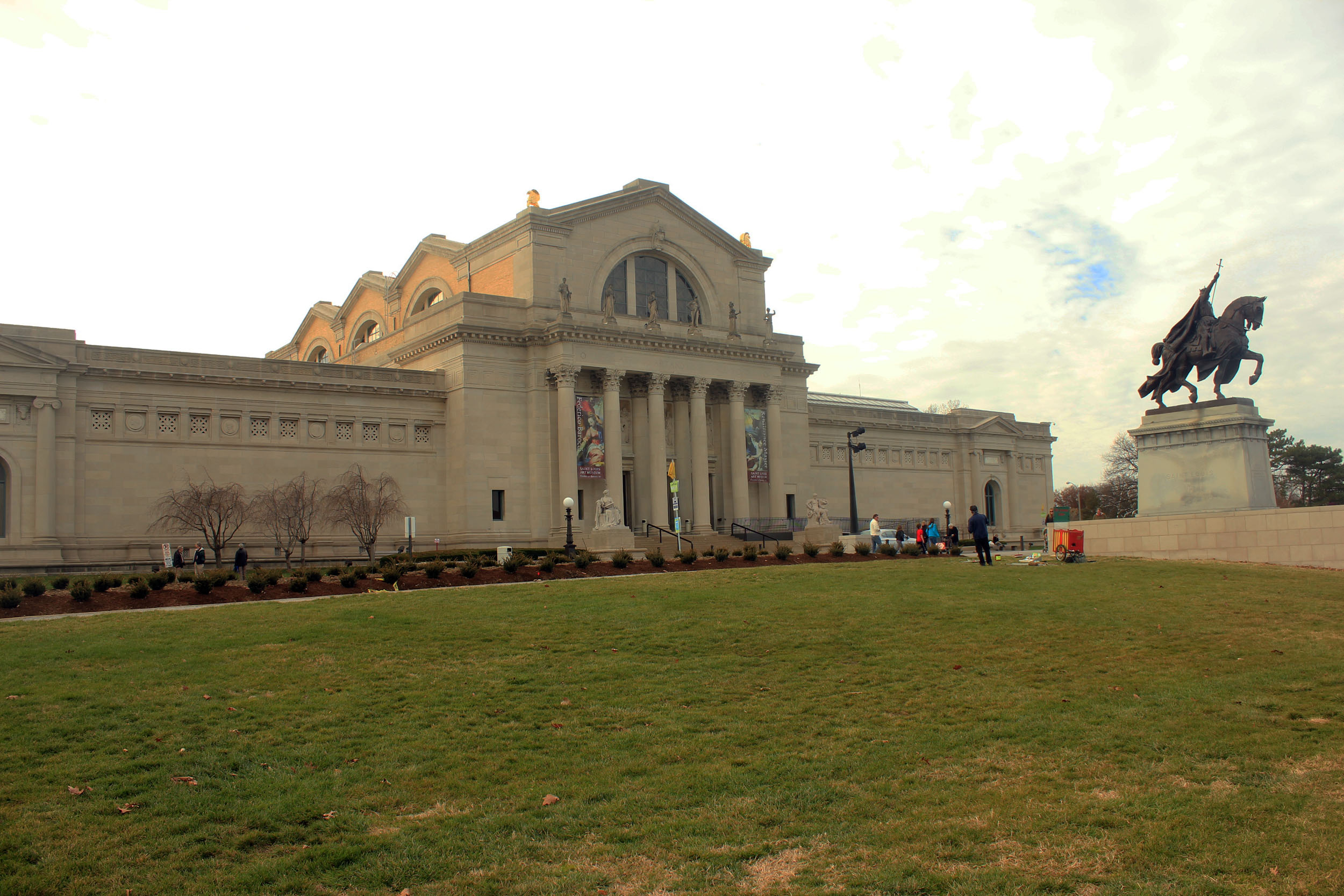
The Saint Louis Art Museum. Free admission.

The Saint Louis Art Museum, located in Forest Park, houses a variety of art media, ranging from ancient artifacts to contemporary exhibits. Other art museums in St. Louis include the Pulitzer Arts Foundation, located in a building designed by the architect and Pritzker Prize winner Tadao Ando, and the Contemporary Art Museum St. Louis, a non-collecting contemporary art museum. Universities in the area also operate museums of art, such as the Saint Louis University Museum of Art and the Kemper Art Museum at Washington University in St. Louis.

The Missouri History Museum, which is located in Forest Park and affiliated with the Missouri Historical Society, offers exhibits on the history of St. Louis. Current exhibits include the 1904 World's Fair, Seeking St. Louis, and Gateway to Pride. The Museum of Westward Expansion, located below the Gateway Arch, details the history of exploration and settlement of the American West. Other local museums include the Eugene Field House and the Campbell House Museum, the latter of which operates as a house museum focused on the Victorian era. The St. Louis area is also home to the National Museum of Transportation, which preserves railroad and other transportation equipment, and the defunct National Blues Museum.

The Gateway Arch, part of the Gateway Arch National Park (known as the Jefferson National Expansion Memorial until 2018), is a popular tourist attraction in downtown St. Louis. Also downtown is Laclede's Landing, a restaurant and nightclub area along the Mississippi riverfront. Nearby, St. Louis Union Station is a renovated railroad terminal that includes retail shops and a luxury hotel, and the privately owned City Museum is a playground-like funhouse attraction located in the Washington Avenue Historic District. The Lemp Mansion, former home of the ill-fated Lemp family, is open to the public as a haunted house, restaurant, and bed and breakfast. Mid America Adventure is an amusement park located in Eureka, Missouri.

Notable museums are also located in surrounding cities. The Delmar Loop, located in University City, just west of the St. Louis city line, is a popular entertainment, cultural and restaurant district, voted one of the "10 Best Streets" in the nation by the American Planning Association. The Butterfly House of the Zoo is located in western St. Louis County in Chesterfield.

The Magic House, St. Louis Children's Museum, is located in Kirkwood west of the city.

The Jefferson Barracks Telephone Museum has an extensive collection of telephones manufactured from the 1900s through the 2000s. Collections include a working Central Office Step Switch, military telephones from WWII through the Vietnam War, hundreds of pieces of telephone-related equipment and tools, a telephone pole complete with climbing equipment, hundreds of pieces of telephone-related memorabilia from the 1880s through the 2000s, a large variety of novelty telephones, a special portable switchboard set up when U.S. Presidents Carter, Ford, Nixon, and Johnson were visiting St. Louis, and a sculpture of Alexander Graham Bell and history of the invention of the telephone. The self-guided, accessible museum has many hands-on, how-things-work displays.

Cahokia Mounds, located near Collinsville, Illinois, holds the ruins of the 12th-century city of the ancient Mississippian aboriginal culture. Its Monk's Mound is the largest prehistoric earthwork in North America and one of more than 60 mounds remaining. This was one of the first eight sites in the US listed as a World Heritage Site by UNESCO. Similar Mississippian mounds gave St. Louis its nickname "Mound City", but most were leveled off and used for fill during development in the 19th century.

== Music and the performing arts ==
St. Louis is home to the Fox Theatre, located in Grand Center, which presents Broadway shows and concert or speaking events. Other theaters include The Muny, a summer musical theatre located in Forest Park and founded in 1919; the Repertory Theatre of St. Louis, the city's major regional theatre, founded in 1966; Opera Theatre of Saint Louis, an annual summer opera festival co-founded by Richard Gaddes in 1976; the Black Rep, founded in 1977; New Line Theatre, an alternative musical theatre company, founded in 1991; Union Avenue Opera; and many others, totaling 60-70 local companies at any given time. Renovations have finished on the Peabody Opera House, located in Downtown West, which allowed for the reopening of the building in October 2011.

The Saint Louis Symphony Orchestra has received six Grammy Awards and fifty-six nominations, and it has performed in the Powell Symphony Hall in Grand Center since 1968. The American conductor Leonard Slatkin led the orchestra through 1996, while Israeli-American violinist Itzhak Perlman served the orchestra as musical advisor from 2002 through 2004. From 2005 to 2018, David Robertson served as the director. Since 2019, Stéphane Denève has served as the director. The Saint Louis Chamber Chorus provides several concerts annually. The Sheldon Concert Hall also serves the area as a jazz and speaking venue.

St. Louis also is associated with rock and roll, jazz, blues, and ragtime music. Chuck Berry, a native St. Louisan, continued to perform in the area throughout his life, while jazz musician Miles Davis had early ties to musical clubs in the region. The area also was home to several significant blues artists, such as Little Milton, Oliver Sain, Albert King, Henry Townsend, Johnnie Johnson, James Crutchfield, and Bennie Smith. During the late 19th and early 20th centuries, Scott Joplin wrote ragtime in the city, and blues performer Louis Jordan operated a club and lived in the city. During the 1950s and 1960s, popular entertainment areas included Gaslight Square, attracting nationally known musicians and performers; however, the area has been redeveloped for residential use.

In recent years, St. Louis has been home to musical artists such as Sheryl Crow, Story of the Year, Greek Fire, Foxing, and The Urge. The region has also produced alt-country bands such as The Bottle Rockets and Uncle Tupelo, whose members went on to found Wilco and Son Volt, as well as rap and hip hop artists like 100 gecs, Nelly, Ali, Murphy Lee, Chingy, J-Kwon, Smino, and producer Metro Boomin.

Several musical clubs in the area are in the Delmar Loop, including The Pageant and Blueberry Hill. There are also numerous live music clubs in the South City area, including BB's, Broadway Oyster Bar, Off Broadway, the Way Out Club, and El Lenador.

== Religion and places of worship ==
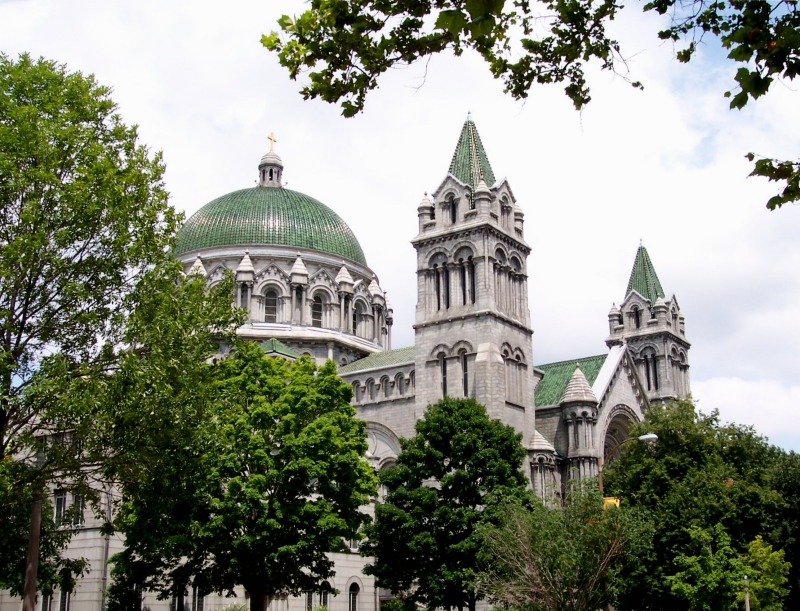
Cathedral Basilica of St. Louis

According to the Association of Religion Data Archives (2000), the largest religious group in the metropolitan area was Catholic with 650,000 members, followed by evangelical Protestant churches with 390,000 members and mainline Protestant churches with 210,000 members. However, 1.3 million St. Louisans were unclaimed by one of the 188 churches or groups studied by the association.

Historically significant churches include the Cathedral Basilica of St. Louis, a Roman Catholic cathedral that is the episcopal see of the Archdiocese of St. Louis. It was built in the Byzantine and Romanesque styles with a large interior mosaic series, and it hosted Pope John Paul II in January 1999.

Other locally notable churches include the Basilica of St. Louis, King of France, the oldest Roman Catholic cathedral west of the Mississippi River and the oldest church in St. Louis; Saint Louis Abbey, whose distinctive architectural style garnered multiple awards at the time of its completion in 1962; and St. Francis de Sales Oratory, a neo-Gothic church completed in 1908 and the second largest church in the city.

The Queen's Daughters is a religious and charitable society founded in St. Louis in 1889 to supplement the work done for the poor by the Society of St. Vincent de Paul.

Several non-Christian faiths call St. Louis home as well. Hindu Temple of St. Louis is the largest Hindu temple in Missouri. The St. Louis Islamic Center was created by Bosnian Muslims in 2001 to serve the Muslim community. Several synagogues exist throughout the St. Louis area as well.

== See also ==
- Landmarks of St. Louis
- List of public art in St. Louis
- Cuisine of St. Louis
