= List of public art in St. Louis =

This is a list of public art in St. Louis, in the United States. This list applies only to works of public art on permanent display in an outdoor public space. For example, this does not include artworks in museums. Public art may include sculptures, statues, monuments, memorials, murals, and mosaics.

Image	Title / subject	Location and coordinates	Date	Artist / designer	Type	Material	Wikidata	Notes	
More images	Apotheosis of St. Louis	Saint Louis Art Museum in Forest Park 38.63980°N 90.29409°W	1906	Charles Henry Niehaus	Equestrian statue	Bronze		Q4780753	
More images	Citygarden	St. Louis Gateway Mall 38.627°N 90.194°W	Various (Opened 2009)		Sculpture garden	Various		Q5124067	
	Dred and Harriet Scott Statue	Gateway Arch National Park 38.62539°N 90.18905°W	2012	Harry Weber	Statue	Bronze		Q75117035	
	Freedom Suits Memorial	Civil Courts Building 38.6275°N 90.19667°W	2022	Preston Jackson	Memorial	Bronze			
More images	Gateway Arch	Gateway Arch National Park 38.6245°N 90.1847°W	1965	Eero Saarinen	Arch	Carbon steel Concrete; Stainless steel		Q2027162	
	Memorial to the Confederate Dead	Forest Park (Removed) 38.64432°N 90.27964°W			Memorial	Stone		Q39079112	Removed June 2017.
	Monument to General Nathaniel Lyon	St. Louis Arsenal 38.59359°N 90.21091°W	1874	Adolphus Druiding	Obelisk	Granite			
More images	The Captains' Return	Laclede's Landing 38.62667°N 90.18287°W	2006	Harry Weber	Statue	Bronze		Q75127716	Depicts Meriwether Lewis, William Clark, and Seaman.
	The Mural Mile (Floodwall)	Kosciusko 38.61469°N 90.18794°W	1997-Present	Various	Graffiti	Concrete, paint			Public collaborative graffiti project on a Mississippi River floodwall.
	The Naked Truth	Compton Hill Reservoir Park 38.36523°N 90.14206°W	1914	Wilhelm Wandschneider	Statue	Bronze		Q110782965	
	Police Memorial	Civil Courts Building 38.62772°N 90.19781°W	1988	Rudolph Torrini	Memorial	Bronze			
	Statue of Christopher Columbus	Tower Grove Park (Removed) 38.60512°N 90.24303°W	1884		Statue			Q96406476	Removed June 2020.
	Statue of David R. Francis	Francis Park 38.58431°N 90.30131°W			Statue	Bronze			
	Statue of Frankie Muse Freeman	Kiener Plaza 38.62606°N 90.19006°W	2017	Brian Owens	Statue	Bronze			
	Statue of George Washington	Lafayette Square 38.61481°N 90.21606°W	1856 (Original 1785-92)	Jean-Antoine Houdon	Statue	Bronze			Bronze casting of Statue of George Washington by Houdon.
	Statue of George Washington	Washington University in St. Louis 38.64809°N 90.3078°W	2003 (Original 1785-92)	Jean-Antoine Houdon	Statue	Bronze			Bronze casting of Statue of George Washington by Houdon.
	Statue of Thomas Hart Benton	Lafayette Park 38.61606°N 90.21644°W	1864	Harriet Hosmer	Statue	Bronze			
	Turtle Park	Forest Park 38.63194°N 90.29306°W	1996	Bob Cassilly	Sculpture garden	Concrete		Q22060360	
