= Staerkel Planetarium =

Planetarium at Parkland College in Champaign, Illinois

Coordinates: 40.132289°N 88.291218°W

William M. Staerkel Planetarium
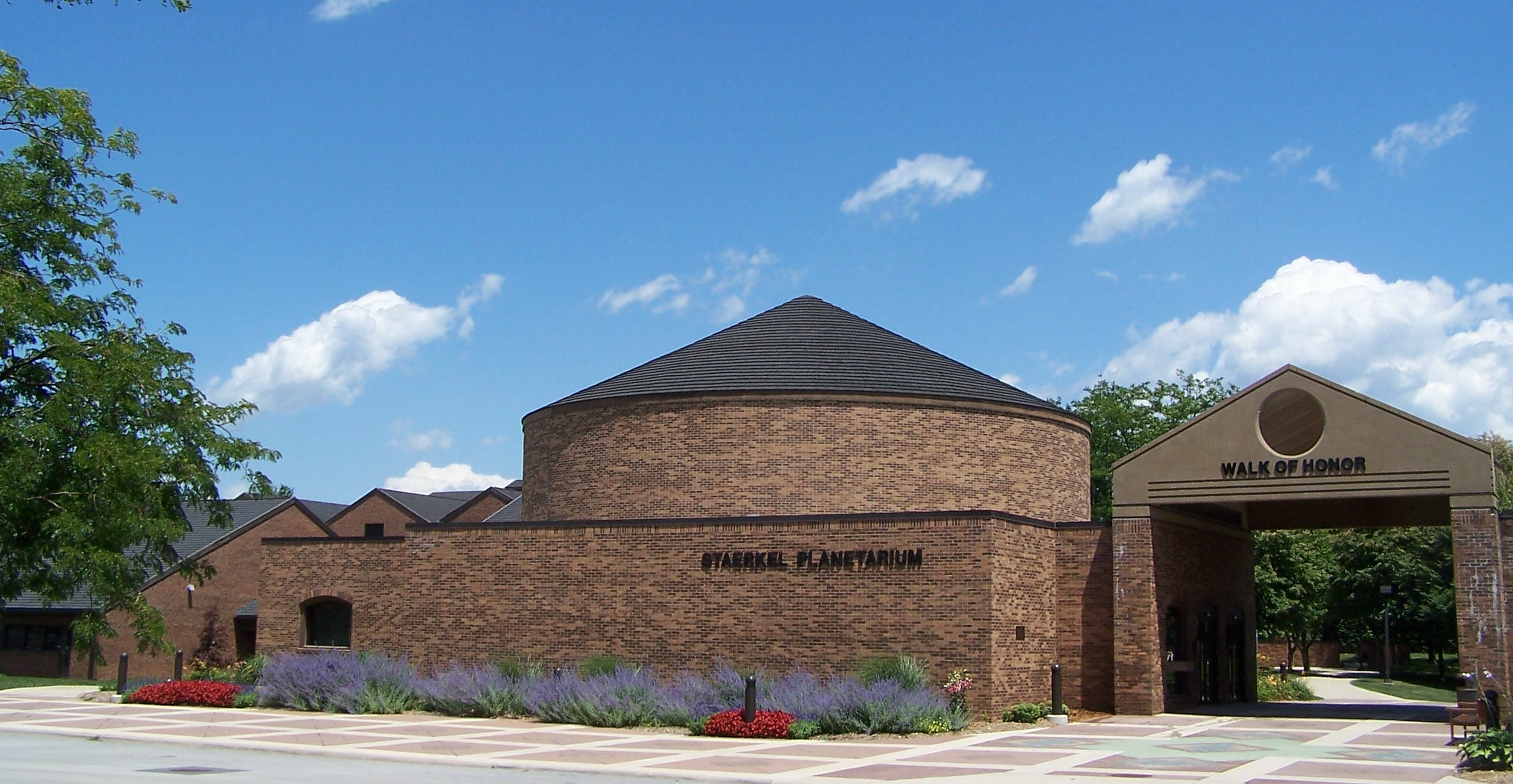
- Exterior of the William M. Staerkel Planetarium
- Interactive map of the William M. Staerkel Planetarium area

General information
- Type: Planetarium
- Location: 2400 W Bradley Ave, Champaign, United States
- Opened: 1987
- Affiliation: Parkland College

Website
- www.parkland.edu/planetarium

The William M. Staerkel Planetarium is a planetarium at Parkland College in Champaign, Illinois. It is the second largest planetarium in the state (after the Adler Planetarium in Chicago) and has the first Carl Zeiss M1015 opto-mechanical star projector installed in the western hemisphere. The Staerkel Planetarium provides science education programs and light show entertainment to as many as 40,000 people each year. It has a 50-foot dome, seats 144, and private group and school show reservations can be made beyond the regular public offerings.

Public shows are every Friday and Saturday evenings. Aside from their regular star shows, the planetarium also hosts a lecture series the first Friday of every month.

The planetarium is named after Parkland College's founding president, who led the college for the first 20 years.

== History ==
“The dream started a long time ago. It began when a group of us, faculty members and administrators together, sat down to develop the specifications for a new college then unbuilt and of course unnamed. Since a basic function of education is to transmit the cultural heritage of a people, we were concerned that the new college would be ideally designed to help teachers accomplish that purpose.

“Now over 20 years later the College continues to mature and develop, we see the dream realized with the dedication of Parkland’s Cultural Center. This is indeed a joyful occasion. To see our dreams come true after all these years gives us a wonderful feeling of pride and satisfaction as we look at this latest addition to this remarkable institution of higher education.”

— William M. Staerkel, in a letter written for the October 1st 1987 dedication

The William M. Staerkel Planetarium at Parkland College, built as part of the college's cultural center, was planned and designed in the late sixties as part of Phase V in the construction of Parkland College's campus. The cultural center was divided into two parts, the theatre and the planetarium, which together cost an estimated $4.2 million to build. (News-Gazette)

The planetarium was named after Parkland College's founding president, who led the college for the first 20 years of its life, during the dedication on 1987-10-01. The planetarium officially opened to the public on 1987-10-22.

== Equipment ==
=== Zeiss Model M1015 ===
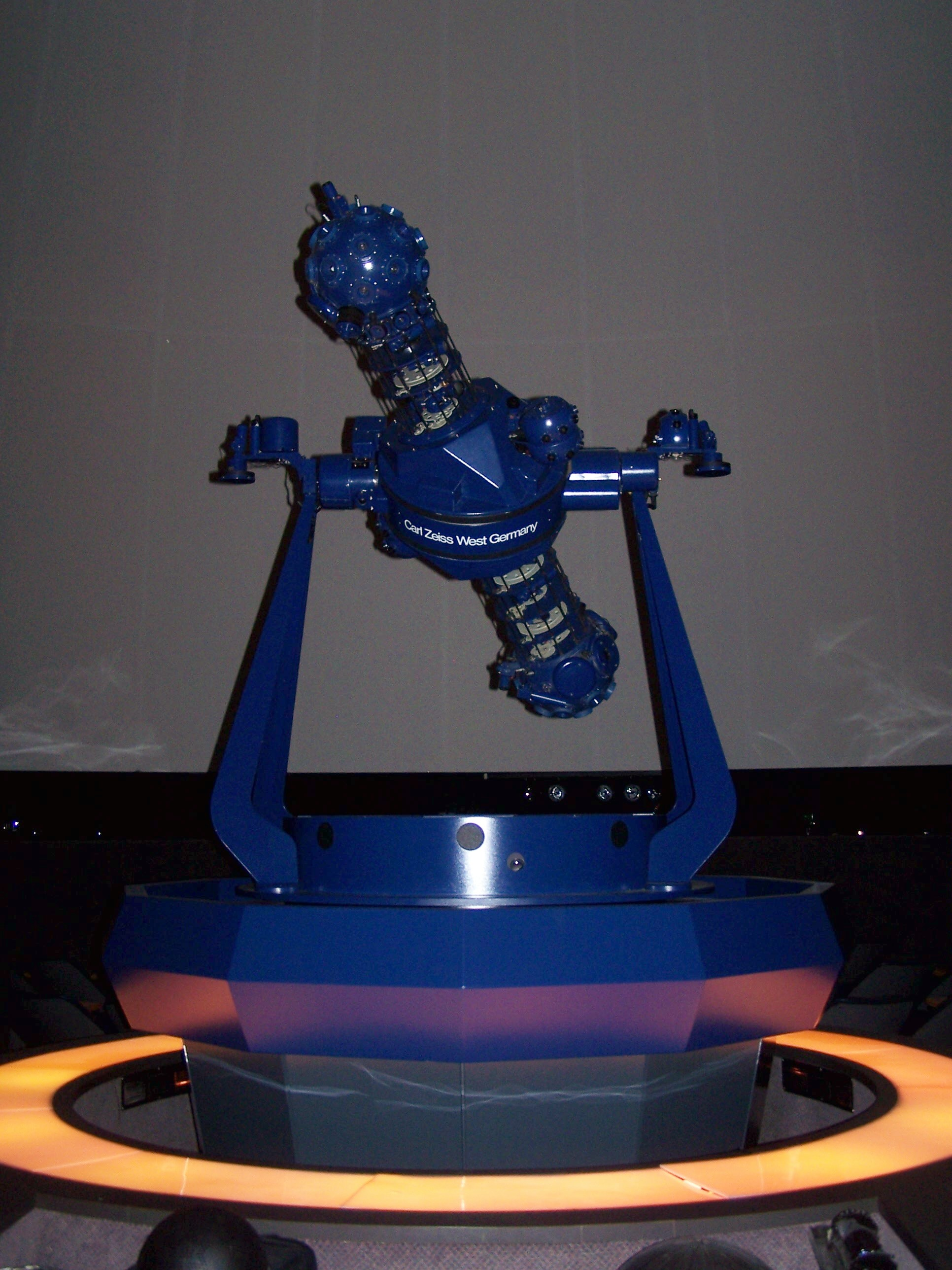
The William M. Staerkel Planetarium's Zeiss M1015

The Planetarium uses the Zeiss Model M1015 star projector, manufactured by Carl Zeiss, Inc. of Germany. It is the first of its kind to be installed anywhere in the world. It projects 7,600 stars down to magnitude 6, 25 star clusters and nebulae, the sun, moon, and the five planets visible to the human eye. The Zeiss can show the daily motions of the sky, the sun, the moon, and the positions of the stars on almost any given day, as well as various astronomical grids and scales. Auxiliary equipment allows projection of rainbows, clouds, solar and lunar eclipses, rotating galaxies, double star systems, and varied constellations.

=== Other equipment ===
It also consists of its dome, automation, sound and film systems, and projection equipment. The planetarium's projection dome is 50 feet in diameter and at its highest point is 31 feet from the floor of the theater. It consists of perforated aluminum panels that are held together with 7,000 rivets and has approximately 43 million holes in its surface. This allows for acoustic integrity and the placement of effects and speakers behind the dome to be seen or heard throughout the dome.

The William M. Staerkel Planetarium uses a specialized automation computer, the MC-10 Media Controller, to automate shows using programmable disks. The MC-10 Media Controller can operate either independently or in conjunction with audio tapes. The Staerkel Planetarium's sound system includes a recording studio and a playback system made up of twelve speakers and two sub-bass enclosures located behind the projection dome. The Staerkel Planetarium has the capability of showing 35mm films and can project an image over more than one-third of the dome surface area. And, in addition to the star projector at the center of the theatre, the planetarium uses 57 carousel slide projectors that can show panoramas to cover the entire dome as well as three CRT projectors which allow for the projection of videos and special effects.

== Lobby attractions ==
=== Solar window ===
The solar window is a gift given in August 1987 by Dr. and Mrs. William M. Staerkel in memory of their parents and as a tribute to the dedicated Parkland College faculty and staff. The solar window, created by artist Arthur Stern, is an abstract representation of the changing daily path of the sun across the sky, from June (top), when the sun is highest and daylight is longest, to December (bottom), when the sun is lowest and daylight is shortest, and back to June. When the sun shines through the window, embedded prisms split the sunlight into its component colors and cast small rainbow-like patterns called spectra inside the building. These spectral colors are repeated in the colors of the windows. As the rotation of the earth makes the sun appear to travel in its daily arc, the patterns of colors cast by the window and the prisms slowly changes position with the changing position of the sun.

=== “Cosmic Blink” ===
“Cosmic Blink”, the mural gracing the lobby of the William M. Staerkel Planetarium, is the result of an idea that came to Dr. Staerkel in the spring of 1985 and later monetary donations to the Parkland College Foundation. Painted by Billy Morrow Jackson, artist in residence at the University of Illinois, the mural depicts the timelessness of mankind's quest to understand the universe. Celestial objects, constellation figures invented by our ancestors, space-age mechanical explorers and the images then beamed back to us, and the intellectual giants whose investigations peeled away layers of the unknown all are represented in the mural. Jackson pays homage to the continuing, local nature of the quest through inclusion of Dr. Staerkel and representative Parkland students and faculty.

== Shows and schedule ==
In addition to planetarium shows for schools and the community, outreach services are also offered to schools, libraries, and civic groups. Public shows are held on most Friday and Saturday evenings except for holidays, including late night rock-n-roll light shows featuring the planetarium's 3,000 watt sound system.

The Staerkel Planetarium also offer science lectures on the first Friday of each month during Parkland College's Spring (February, March, and April) and Fall (October, November, and December) semesters, as part of the World of Science Lecture Series.

The planetarium also occasionally hosts live music performances from avant-garde groups such as Stars of the Lid.
