= Robert Cassilly =

Robert Cassilly may refer to:

- Robert Cassilly (politician) (born 1958), American politician in Maryland
- Bob Cassilly (1949–2011), American artist
