= Frederick Conway (artist) =

American artist

Frederick Eldridge Conway
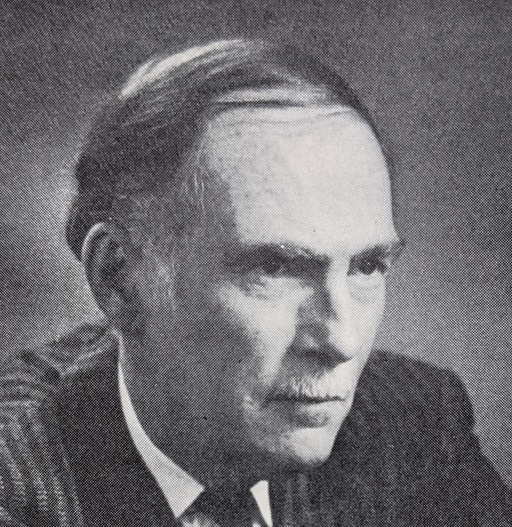
- Born: August 24, 1900; St. Louis, Missouri
- Died: August 6, 1973 (aged 72); St. Louis, Missouri

Frederick Eldridge Conway (1900–1973) was an American painter and muralist.

== Early life and education ==
Conway was born in St. Louis in 1900. Conway studied at the St. Louis School of Fine Arts (now called the Sam Fox School of Design & Visual Arts), and then moved to Paris to study at the Académie Julian, and at the Academies Moderne and La Grande Chaumiere.

== Art career ==
Conway was part a community of 20th Century St. Louis artists that included Ed Boccia, Fred Green Carpenter, Rudolph Edward Torrini, Herb Cummings, Werner Drewes, Gustav Goetsch, Bill Fett, Phil Sultz, Jan Sultz, and Bob Cassilly.

Conway taught at the art school of Washington University in St. Louis from 1929 to 1970. Conway was one of the teachers of Billy Morrow Jackson, and was "a close friend and early supporter of German Expressionist painter Max Beckmann". In the 1930s Conway taught at the Ste. Genevieve Art Colony in Ste. Genevieve, Missouri.

=== Public murals ===
Conway's mural, The Roundup, a 1940 oil on canvas painting, hangs in the United States Post Office of Purcell, Oklahoma. It was procured by the United States Treasury Section of Painting and Sculpture as part of a 48-state competition to create murals for post offices.

Another Conway mural, The Movement of Time from Redman to Truman (1967), is in the Richard Bolling Federal Building in Kansas City, Missouri.

His 70-foot long mural Oklahoma Land Run is installed in Tulsa, Oklahoma's First Place Tower. Conway was chosen to create the 1950 mural through a US$25,000 competition run by the First National Bank.

== Collections ==
Conway's work is included in the collections of the Smithsonian American Art Museum and the Kemper Art Museum.
