= Rudolph Edward Torrini =

American sculptor

- Born: March 31, 1923; St. Louis, Missouri, U.S.
- Died: September 5, 2018 (aged 95)
- Education: Washington University in St. Louis; Accademia di Belle Arti di Firenze; University of Notre Dame
- Known for: Sculpture, Wood Carving, Drawing

Rudolph Edward Torrini (March 31, 1923 – September 5, 2018) was an American artist best known for his sculptures, wood carvings and bronze public monuments in the St. Louis area, including "The Immigrants", "The Union Soldier," and "Martin Luther King." A student of Croatian sculptor Ivan Meštrović, his work is also influenced by the works of Auguste Rodin. Torrini trained and taught Bob Cassilly, founder of the City Museum in St. Louis, and also helped establish the Master of Fine Arts program at Fontbonne College.

== Life and career ==
=== Early life ===
Rudolph Torrini was born in St. Louis the son of Stella DiPalma, a pianist in silent movie houses, and Cherinto Torrini, a plaster mold-maker from Garfagnana, Tuscany. After the death of his father, he became a jazz saxophone performer in his teenage years to support his family, then enlisted in the U.S. Navy in 1942, serving as a clarinetist on the ship's band of the transport ship U.S.S. West Point.

Torrini had begun drawing during the war, and afterwards earned a BFA at the St. Louis School of Fine Arts (now Sam Fox School of Design & Visual Arts) at Washington University in St. Louis, then was awarded a Fulbright scholarship to study for a year at the Accademia di Belle Arti di Firenze in Florence, Italy in 1949. Afterwards, he earned his MFA at the University of Notre Dame, where he studied under Ivan Meštrović. He went on to teach first at Webster College (now Webster University) for 17 years, then chaired the Art Department at Fontbonne College for 35 years.

=== St. Louis artists community ===
Torrini was part of the community of 20th Century St. Louis artists that included Edward Boccia, Fred Green Carpenter, Fred Conway, Herb Cummings, Werner Drewes, Gustav Goetsch, Bill Fett, Phil Sultz, Jan Sultz, and Bob Cassilly. He did most of his initial work with clay at his studio in his home in the St. Louis suburb of Webster Groves. Torrini is married to Ann Walsh Torrini, a painter and maker of stained glass window illustrations, and has four children.

=== Musical career ===
Rudolph Torrini first worked as a jazz saxophone player and clarinetists during the 1930s and 40s, including performing as part of the Navy Band present at Franklin Delano Roosevelt's funeral. Later, in the 1970s, he formed a Dixieland band with five other musicians called Tiger Rag Jazz Forever, which performed in the St. Louis area and recorded 3 LPs, including Tigers on Parade. All of their recordings feature clarinet and saxophone solos by Torrini. In addition, he was a lover of classical music, and always listened to it while working on his sculptures in his studio.

=== Death ===
Torrini died on September 5, 2018, at the age of 95, following complications from Alzheimer's disease.

== Major works ==
Rudolph Torrini is best known for his bronze cast public monuments, but he has also made many smaller statues, bas-reliefs, wood carvings, and drawings. A life long Catholic, many of his works have religious themes (for example "John Paul II", "St. Patrick"), while others commemorate groups or individuals, ("Italian Immigrants", "Martin Luther King") or explore the human body ("The Four Seasons and the Clouds").

=== Public monuments in the St. Louis Area ===
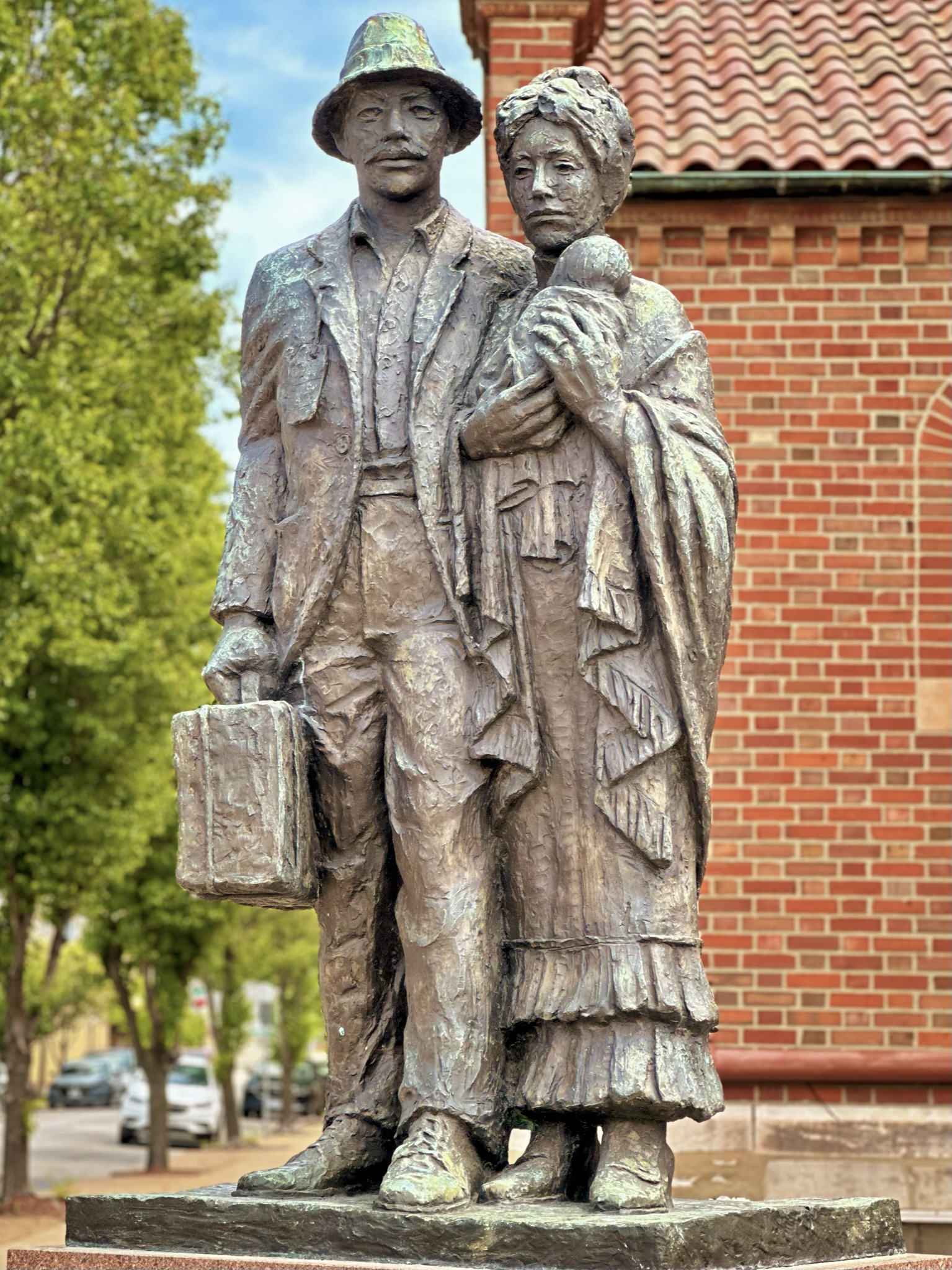
- The Italian Immigrants
  "The Union Soldier," Museum of Westward Expansion inside the Gateway Arch
- "The Italian Immigrants," The Hill
- "The Soccer Player," St. Louis Soccer Park (7 foot bronze)
- "Martin Luther King," Fountain Park, 1978 (11 foot bronze, cast in Italy by Ferdinando Marinelli Artistic Foundry Florence, unveiled by St. Louis Mayor James Conway)
- "St. Louis Police Memorial, Civil Courts Building, 1988. (10 foot bronze, commemorates St. Louis policemen fallen in the line of duty)
- "A Boy and His Dog," Dogtown
- "Christopher Harris," Cardinal Glennon Children's Hospital, 1997 (5 foot hollow-cast bronze; commemorates 9 years old child slain in the crossfire of a gunfight. Melted hand guns incorporated inside the cast to symbolize the importance of non-violence. Dedicated by St. Louis Mayor Clarence Harmon).
- "Pope John Paul II," Cathedral Basilica of Saint Louis (7 foot bronze)
- "The Four Seasons and the Clouds," City Museum (Plaster)

=== Other major works ===
- "Martyr's Monument," Ruma, Illinois, 1992. (15 foot bronze; commemorates 5 nuns killed in the Liberian civil war)
- "St. Patrick," Missouri S&T, Rolla, Missouri
- "Tom Dooley," University of Notre Dame, Michigan

=== Discography ===
- I Hear Tigers
- Jazz Classics
- Tigers on Parade

== Honors and awards ==
- Knighthoods from the Italian government (Cavaliere and Commendatore al Merito della Republica, Italy, 1973 and 1977
- Fellow of the National Sculpture Society, 1990
- Gold Medal from the Italian city of Lucca for contributions to Italian-American culture (Lucchesi chi hanno onorato Lucca nel mondo), 1990
- Honorary Lifetime Achievement in the Arts Award, Webster Groves, Missouri, 2012.
