= Turtle Park =

Park in St. Louis, Missouri, US

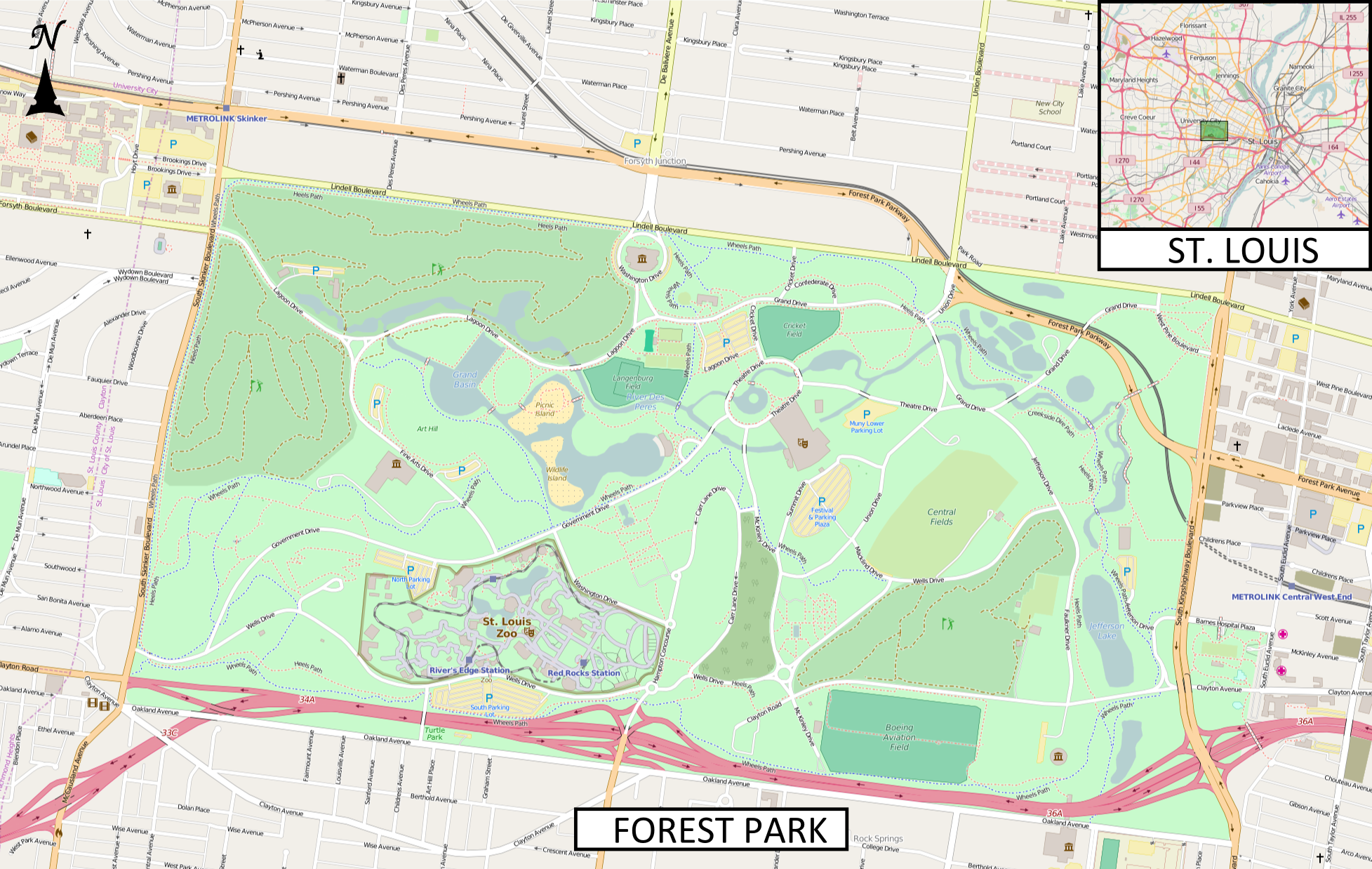
- Location within Forest Park (St. Louis)
- Type: Sculpture park and playground
- Location: St. Louis, Missouri, United States
- Coordinates: 38°37′55″N 90°17′35″W
- Created: August 1996
- Operator: St. Louis Parks Department and Forest Park Forever
- Status: Open all year (6 a.m. to 10 p.m.)
- Public transit: MetroBus

Turtle Park (also Turtle Playground) is a sculpture park located at the southern edge of Forest Park in St. Louis, Missouri at the intersection of Oakland Avenue and Tamm Avenue. The park contains seven concrete turtles and one snake. The turtles were designed and sculpted by Bob Cassilly and the park opened in August 1996. Turtle Park can be seen from Interstate 64 and the Saint Louis Zoo to the north.

== Design ==
The park contains seven turtle species that are native to Missouri as well as a clutch of eggs. The three large turtles are a snapping turtle, a Mississippi map turtle and a red-eared slider and named after Sunny Glassberg's children: Dick, Tom, and Sally. The four smaller turtles are a stinkpot turtle and three box turtles, named after Glassberg's grandchildren: David, Adam, Emily, and Antonio. The snapping turtle is 40 feet (12 m) long and used 120,000 pounds (54,000 kg) of concrete. A concrete snake lines the park; its head is attached to and appears to be biting the Tamm Avenue Overpass at the west end of the park. The design allows kids to climb on the turtle's shells and into their open mouths.

== History ==
St. Louis philanthropist Sunny Glassberg developed the idea and donated the funds for Turtle Park. She hired Bob Cassilly to design the park and the St. Louis Parks Department and Forest Park Forever helped locate the land for the park, a strip of Forest Park that had been cut off by Interstate 64. Glassberg wanted the park to be a fun place for children: "I wanted to give children a place where they could be happy, where they could feel inspired. Because I feel that that sort of thing is contagious." The Park opened in August 1996. The reconstruction of Interstate 64 in 2009 necessitated the removal of the snake's head. Cassilly's team removed the head and the new bridge was designed in such a way that the head could be placed back on the overpass.

Turtle Park was voted the "Best Picnic Spot" in St. Louis in 2011 by the Riverfront Times. In 2015, MySun Charitable Foundation sponsored renovations to Turtle Park, including new turf, resurfacing the access path, and the installation of a water fountain.

== See also ==
- Cementland, another St. Louis concrete sculpture park created by Bob Cassilly
