= Charles Rain =

American painter

Charles Whedon Rain
- Born: 1911; Knoxville, Tennessee
- Died: 1985 (aged 73–74); New York
- Education: School of the Art Institute of Chicago
- Style: Magic realism

Charles Rain was an American magic realist painter during the 20th century.

== Biography ==
Charles Whedon Rain was born in 1911 in Knoxville, Tennessee. He grew up in Lincoln, Nebraska and studied at the School of the Art Institute of Chicago in 1931-1933, with fellow Nebraskan artist and friend Keith Martin. Rain would follow his studies with a year-long trip to Europe in 1934, where he traveled to Berlin, Paris, and Vienna, meeting several artists there, including Max Beckmann and Otto Dix. Rain returned to the United States in 1935, settling in New York.

Charles Rain was a prominent member of the Magic Realists, a movement of American painters influenced by European trompe l'oeil and Surrealism. A 1942 exhibition by the Museum of Modern Art titled American Realists and Magic Realists featured paintings by Charles Rain, amongst other artists such as Andrew Wyeth and Peter Blume. Rain also created costume designs for a ballet performed by the School of American Ballet. He died in New York in 1985.

== Legacy ==
In 1999, the Sheldon Museum of Art held a Magic Realism exhibition all about Charles Rain's artworks.

In 2019, Charles Rain's costume designs for the ballet Yankee Clipper were featured in an exhibition at the Museum of Modern Art about Lincoln Kirstein, a co-founder of the New York City Ballet and the School of American Ballet.

The Sheldon Museum of Art has a gallery named after Charles Rain, honoring the artist's large donation of his artworks and the Charles Rain and Charlotte Rain Koch Gallery Fund.
