= Prospectus News =

Prospectus News is the independent student newspaper of Parkland College, a two-year community college in Champaign, Illinois.

Prospectus News provides up-to-date information regarding the latest happenings at Parkland, as well as things happening in the community involving Parkland, Parkland students, and alumni. Issues are published every Wednesday during the school year and once a month throughout the summer.

Originally created as the Parkland College Prospectus in 1969 in Champaign, Illinois, Prospectus News is a collegiate news source in print, Web, and design media formats. Prospectus News is published weekly during the semester and tri-weekly during the summer.
