= Parkland College (United States) =

Community college in Champaign, Illinois, US

Coordinates: 40.132°N 88.290°W

- Former name: Parkland Community College
- Type: Public community college
- Established: 1966; 60 years ago
- President: Pamela Lau
- Students: 5,686 (Fall 2022)
- Location: Champaign, Illinois, U.S.
- Colors: Green and gold
- Sporting affiliations: NJCAA; Mid-West Athletic Conference
- Mascot: Cobra
- Website: parkland.edu

Parkland College is a public community college in Champaign, Illinois. It is part of the Illinois Community College System serving Community College District 505, which includes parts of Coles, Champaign, DeWitt, Douglas, Edgar, Ford, Iroquois, Livingston, Moultrie, McLean, Piatt, and Vermilion Counties. Parkland College enrolls approximately 9,000 students annually, with more than 340,000 students served since September 1967.

William M. Staerkel Planetarium is located at Parkland College.

== Campus ==
Located at 2400 W. Bradley Avenue in Champaign's northwest corner, Parkland's 255-acre main campus is centrally accessible to the 54 communities it serves. It lies in close proximity to the University of Illinois at Urbana–Champaign. Its off-campus locations for instruction include Parkland College on Mattis at 1307-1319 N. Mattis Avenue, Champaign, and the Institute of Aviation at the University of Illinois Willard Airport in Savoy, Illinois.

== History ==
Bolstered with state support from the Illinois Public Junior College Act of 1965, "Illinois Junior College District 505" was established in March 1966 by a referendum of residents from incorporated and unincorporated areas surrounding Champaign–Urbana. The college was renamed Parkland Community College in 1967 before its first fall semester classes began. William M. Staerkel was Parkland's first president, serving the college from 1967 to 1987. While the first classes were held at temporary sites in downtown Champaign, the school's permanent campus opened in fall 1973.

Parkland College has been accredited by the North Central Association of Colleges and Schools, Higher Learning Commission since 1972. Its seven-member Board of Trustees is elected by the residents of the district, with each trustee serving a six-year term. The board provides local control and direction for the college, operating in accordance with Parkland's established policies and procedures.

== Academics ==
Parkland College confers the Associate in Arts, Associate in Science, Associate in Fine Arts, Associate in Engineering Science, Associate in Applied Science, and Associate in General Studies degrees.

Today, approximately 9,000 students enroll in Parkland College credit courses annually. More than 100 degree and certificate programs of study are available, leading students to career and job placement or to educational transfer to four-year colleges and universities. Parkland College offers courses in online, in-person, and hybrid formats. The college also offers a robust noncredit course offering through its Community Education department.

Parkland College provides numerous academic support services and resources for students, including the Parkland College Learning Commons, a unified learning assistance center that provides peer tutoring, a writing lab, tutoring by math faculty, developmental learning modules, study skills tutorials, and more. The Parkland College Library, also part of the learning commons, holds a collection of over 120,000 volumes; its materials help fulfill student curricular/academic program needs as well as the personal enrichment and lifelong learning needs of the college community. In conjunction with the college's Center for Excellence in Teaching and Learning, the Library also administers SPARK, Parkland's digital institutional repository of scholarly works.

== Culture and community ==
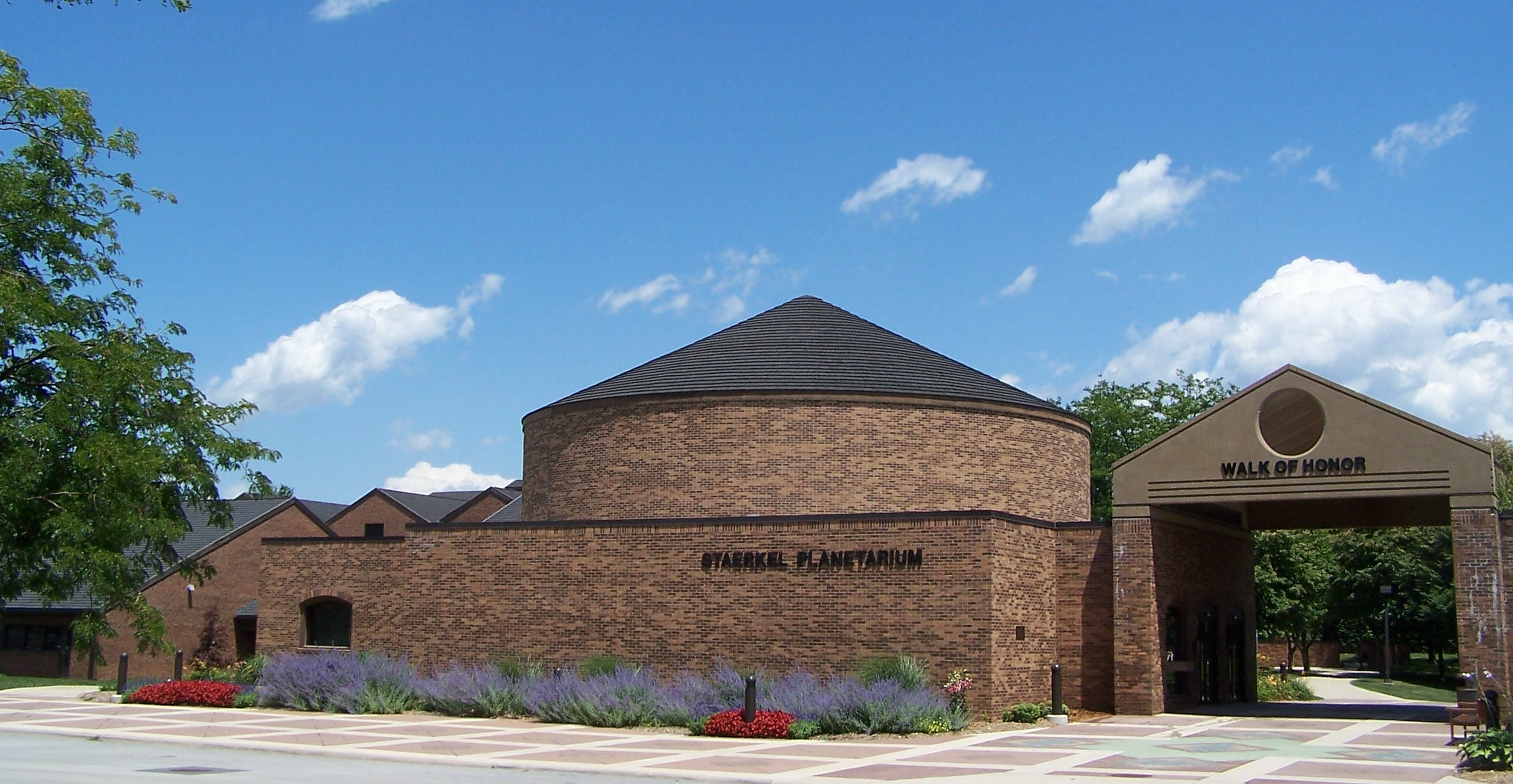
Exterior of the William M. Staerkel Planetarium.

Parkland's cultural center contains a 320-seat performing arts theater and a 50-foot dome planetarium. The Parkland Theatre, William M. Staerkel Planetarium, and Giertz Gallery offer free or affordable performances, programs, and exhibits year-round to campus and community members. Parkland's radio station is WPCD 88.7 FM and its student-run newspaper is the Prospectus. The college offers an educational cable channel, PCTV, which airs cultural/educational and classic shows; a state-licensed Child Development Center which serves Parkland students and area residents; and a student-run music production studio.

== Student life ==
More than 20 campus clubs and organizations at Parkland College provide students with opportunities for volunteerism, leadership development, and camaraderie. While many of these are organized based on academic fields, such as the Business Club, Parkland Motorsports, and the Pre-Law Club, diversity is rich among the established clubs, with groups among them such as Alpha Phi Omega, the International Students Association, Japanese Culture Club, Black Student Association, Club Latino, Muslim Student Association, Parkland Christian Fellowship, and Parkland PRIDE! (LGBTQ support group).

=== Athletics ===
Parkland students also take part in extramural team sports under the mascot Cobras, including baseball, softball, volleyball, men's and women's basketball, golf, and men's and women's soccer. A Division II (Division I Soccer) member of the National Junior Collegiate Athletic Association, the Parkland Cobras mark the following accomplishments:

- NJCAA Baseball Champions: 2002, 2009
- NJCAA Women's Volleyball Champions: 1999, 2015, 2016, 2021
- NJCAA Men's Basketball Champions: 1986
- NCJAA Men's Golf Champions: 2021

=== Transportation ===
The main campus of Parkland College is accessible via the Champaign–Urbana Mass Transit District. Numerous bus routes connect the college to destinations across Champaign and Urbana.

== Notable alumni ==
- Juan Acevedo—Major League Baseball player
- Bonnie Blair—Five-time U.S. Olympic Gold Medalist, Speedskating
- Mark Carlson—Major League Baseball umpire
- Jeremih Felton—R & B singer
- James T. Harris—radio talk show host
- Shane Heams—U.S. Olympian, Baseball (2000)
- Kevin Kiermaier—Major League Baseball outfielder
- David Patrick—Gold Medalist, 400-meter hurdle, IAAF World Cup; U.S. Olympian (1992)
- Spencer Patton—Major League Baseball player
- Kevin Roberson—Major League Baseball player
- Louis Sola—Federal Maritime Commission
- Michael Damian Thomas—Hugo Award-winning science fiction editor and podcaster, publisher of Uncanny Magazine
- Dan Winkler—Major League Baseball pitcher
- Nick Wittgren—Major League Baseball pitcher
