= Keith Martin (artist) =

American painter

Keith Morrow Martin
- Born: 1911; Lincoln, Nebraska, United States
- Died: 1983 (aged 71–72); Cockeysville, Maryland, United States
- Education: University of Nebraska, School of the Art Institute of Chicago
- Style: Abstraction, surrealism, and collage

Keith Martin (also known as Keith Morrow Martin; 1911–1983) was an American abstract and surrealist painter and collagist during the 20th century. His paintings are in a multitude of art museums and collections, including the Smithsonian American Art Museum, The National Gallery of Art, and the Museum of Modern Art.

== Biography ==
Keith Morrow Martin was born in Lincoln, Nebraska, in 1911. He studied fine arts at the University of Nebraska, graduating in the class of 1933. During his studies, Martin would win a state-wide poster contest in 1930. After graduating, Martin would attend the Art Institute of Chicago with his childhood friend and fellow artist Charles Rain, with both of them traveling to a variety of European cities such as Vienna, Paris, and Berlin in the 1930s-1940s. Martin served in the army as a camouflager and was discharged in the autumn of 1945.

Although he lived in New York from 1937-1941, Martin's main residence was in Baltimore, Maryland, where he spent the majority of his career (35 years), including teaching at the Baltimore Museum of Art from 1958-68. He died in Cockeysville, Maryland, in 1983.

== Career and Exhibitions ==
Keith Martin's art style shifted throughout his career, beginning in a surrealist style during the 1930s-1940s and changing to abstraction in the 1950s.

In 1935, Keith Martin had a solo exhibition at the Julien Levy gallery in New York City, an early center for surrealist and modern art. In 1936 and 1937, Martin designed costumes for ballets performed by the School of American Ballet. Martin also participated in a show in Minneapolis in 1947 alongside other Nebraskan artists, including Dwight Kirsch and Gladys M. Lux. Later this same year, Martin's paintingThe Tragedy of Hamlet would go on display at an exhibition at the University of Nebraska. In 1956, Martin had another exhibition in New York, this time at the Duveen-Graham Gallery.

== Collections ==
- The University of Maryland has a collection of ink drawings and lithographs by Keith Martin.
- The Art Institute of Chicago has Martin's painting The Tragedy of Hamlet from 1947.
- The Museum of Modern Art has a collection of Martin's ballet costume drawings.
- The Smithsonian American Art Museum has five of Martin's artworks: Witch Box (1964), Yellow Lily #1 (1971), Disaster Area (1970), Dried Leaves (1965), and Altar Table (1966).
- The National Gallery of Art has several works by Martin, including drawings and a collage.
- The Sheldon Museum of Art has a variety of paintings, drawings, and collages by Keith Martin.
- The Museum of Nebraska Art has a collection of some of Martin's paintings and drawings.
- The Baltimore Museum of Art has several paintings, drawings, and collages by Martin.
- In 2019, Keith Martin's costume designs for the ballets Harlequin for President and Show Piece were featured in an exhibition at the Museum of Modern Art about Lincoln Kirstein, a co-founder of the New York City Ballet and the School of American Ballet.
