= Richard Bolling Federal Building =

Office skyscraper in Kansas City, Missouri

- U.S. National Register of Historic Places
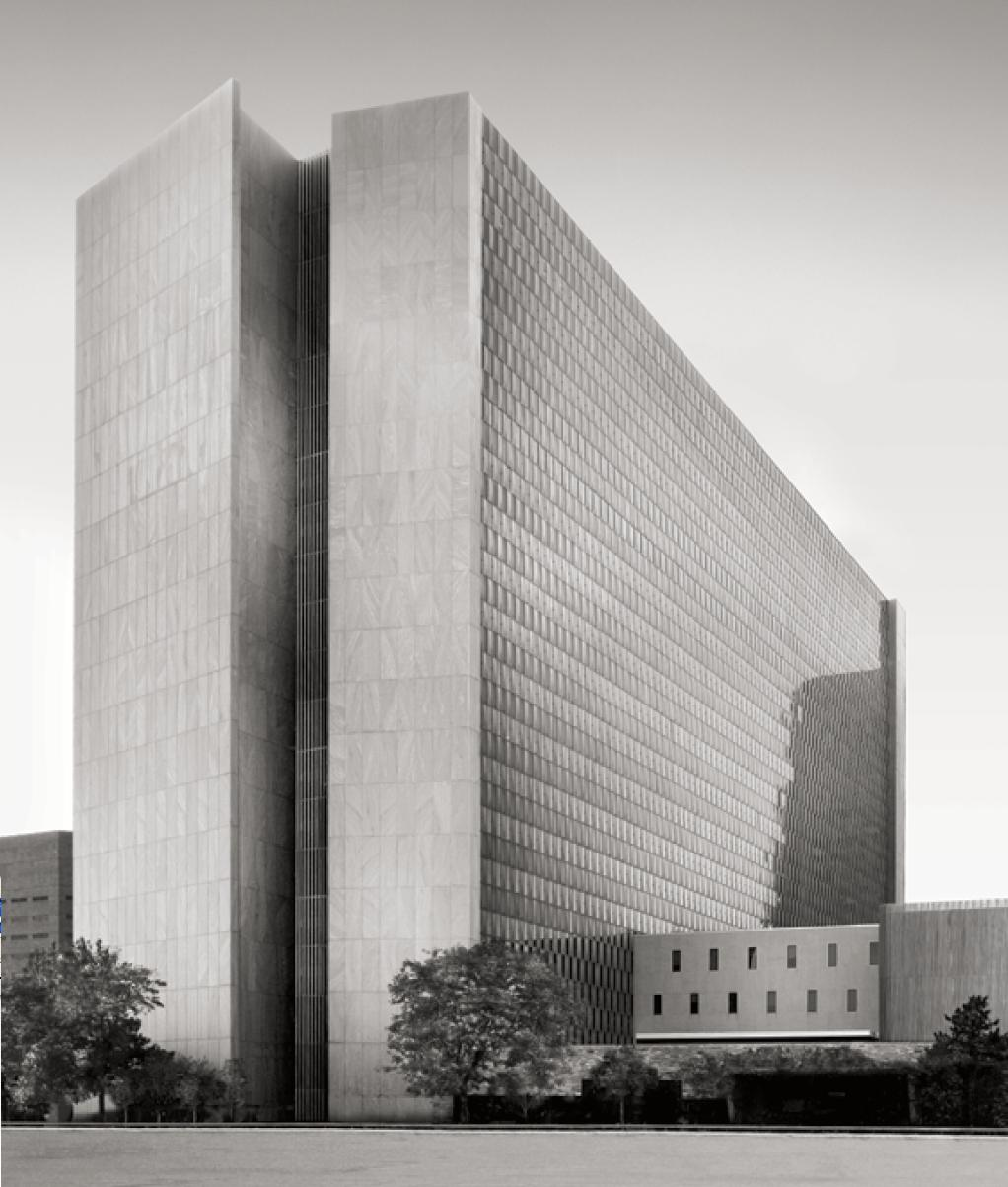
- The Richard Bolling Federal Building

- Location within Missouri Location within the United States
- Location: 601 East 12th St., Kansas City, Missouri, United States
- Coordinates: 39°05′56″N 94°34′34″W
- Built: 1962–1965
- NRHP reference No.: 100006773
- Added to NRHP: August 2, 2021

The Richard Bolling Federal Building is a United States federal building located at 601 East 12th Street in Kansas City, Missouri. Completed in 1965, the building is bordered by East Twelfth, East Thirteenth, Locust, and Holmes streets in the Central Business District in Kansas City. The building was named for Congressman Richard Walker Bolling in 1994. It was listed on the National Register of Historic Places in 2021.

== History ==
In the years following World War II, the federal government grew rapidly and the changing needs of the federal workforce required office buildings designed to meet new challenges. Mechanized mass-production techniques for building components and increased familiarity with innovative construction materials and technologies provided architects with new ways to create functional and cost-efficient buildings. Structural steel, glass, and concrete became widely used building materials. At the same time, the American public was receptive to new, unprecedented architectural forms and ideals. Throughout the United States, federal architecture was less ceremonial, monumental, and ornate than public buildings from previous eras, and for the first time government buildings began to resemble private architecture.

The design of the new Kansas City federal building was the product of a joint-venture collaboration of four firms: Voskamp and Slezak, Everitt and Keleti, Radotinsky Meyn Deardorff, and Howard, Needles, Tammen & Bergendoff. Voskamp and Slezak of Kansas City was the lead firm in the project. Construction began in 1962, and was completed in 1965. The site occupies two full blocks and contains a tall office tower, a low building, and a landscaped plaza. Many architects used this combination of built components for federal building design during the 1950s and 1960s, possibly in emulation of the Headquarters of the United Nations. In 1994, the building was rededicated in honor of Congressman Richard Bolling (1916-1991), who represented Missouri's 5th congressional district from 1949 to 1983. Bolling was a member of the Committee on Rules and greatly influenced congressional reform in the 1970s.

As of 2015, 16 federal agencies, including the Social Security Administration, U.S. Army Corps of Engineers, and Health and Human Services, occupy the building. The building has also served as a courthouse for the United States District Court for the Western District of Missouri.

== Architecture ==
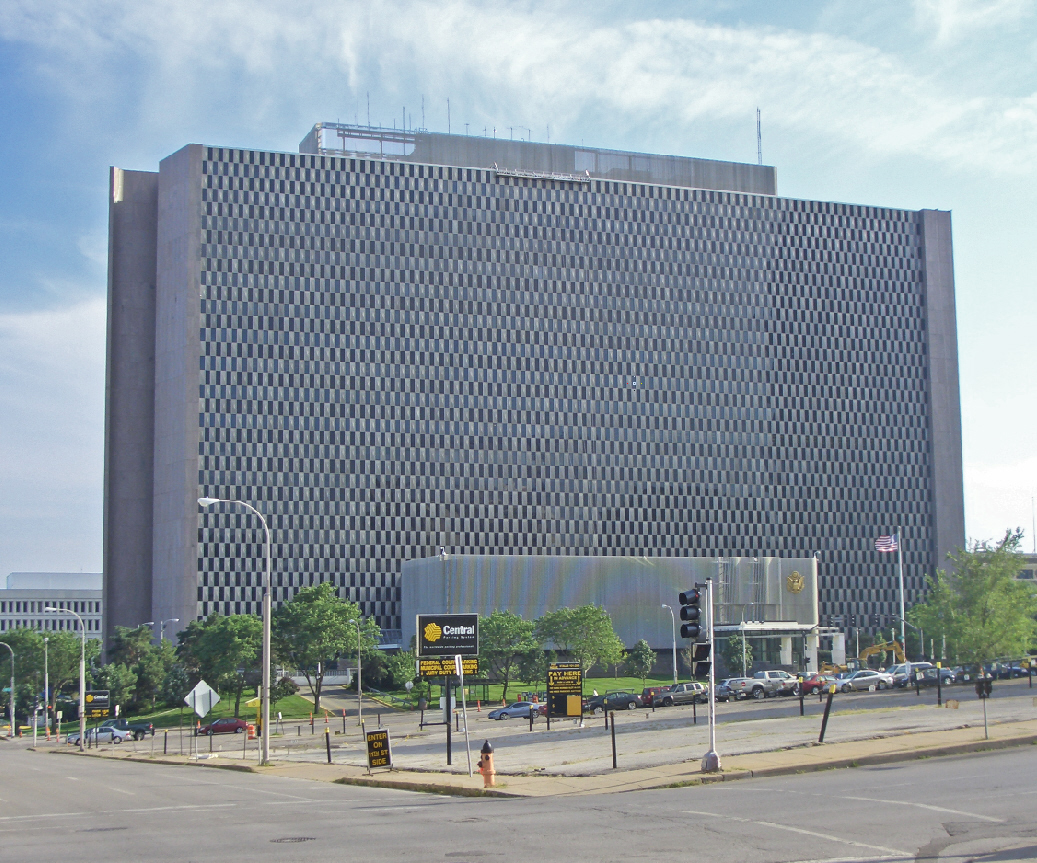
Side view of the Richard Bolling Federal Building.

The building contains 1.2 million gross square feet, the most out of any other building in the midwest, pairing a tall office tower with a long, low building arranged around a central plaza. The dominant feature of the site is the 18-story office tower with a flat roof. Using Modern-era materials, the building has a fire-proof steel frame. The two primary elevations are faced with glass panes and aluminum panels that alternate in a checkerboard pattern. The glass is tinted gray and the aluminum panels are slightly concave with a large X pattern located within each plate. The two narrow end walls are devoid of fenestration. These angular elevations are faced with variegated granite. The long, low building is set slightly off-center of the tower. Long vertical strips of aluminum tube cladding are original to the building, but sections of it were removed and reinstalled in a wave pattern during the 2000 renovations. A large bronze Great Seal of the United States with an eagle motif signifies the building's federal use.

The interior features public spaces finished in high-quality materials. Marble piers are present in the main lobby, while marble paneled walls are in the elevator lobby. Dark granite tiles cover the floors of both areas. Public art is an integral element of both the interior and exterior of the building. A large mural titled The Movement of Time from Redman to Truman (1967) by Frederick Conway is located in the lobby. A bas-relief stone sculpture called The Builders (1966) by Costantino Nivola forms the exterior base of the Twelfth Street elevation.

The U.S. General Services Administration (GSA) initiated several projects to improve the building. BNIM Architects developed designs for the facility that included a new entry pavilion, corridor renovations, and plaza improvements. Completed in 2003, the renovations to the building and plaza were part of GSA's First Impressions initiative, which strives to improve the entrance experience for both tenants and visitors. The architects designed a new entrance lobby on the Twelfth Street elevation. A covered walkway leads to a new two-story, glass-enclosed entrance pavilion and lobby that is connected to the lower building, but also provides access to the office tower. The glass pavilion has a flat roof that is supported by four white columns. This new entrance serves to visually connect the large tower to the Civic Center at Twelfth and Locust streets.

Renovations to the plaza integrated security features into the design with the installation of new flagpoles, benches, and planters. A black granite reflecting pool visually extends the black terrazzo floor of the lobby. In 2004, BNIM Architects, along with J.E. Dunn Construction, received an Honor Award from the Kansas City chapter of the American Institute of Architects for these renovations and alterations. The jury praised the architects' design, which reestablishes the connection between the federal building and its larger urban setting. BNIM Architects also received a 2004 GSA Design Award for its innovative entrance and landscape plans that incorporate state-of-the-art security while maintaining a welcoming atmosphere.

A separate project by Helix Architecture Design was later initiated to provide a complete modernization and renovation of the building, including new lighting systems and total replacement of heating, cooling, plumbing, and electrical systems. This project was set to span ten years, at an estimated cost of $250 million.

== Significant events ==
- 1961-1965: Building designed and constructed
- 1966: The Builders installed
- 1967: The Movement of Time from Redman to Truman installed
- 1994: Building rededicated to honor Congressman Richard Bolling
- 2002: GSA commences 10-year, $250 million renovation
- 2002-2003: New entry pavilion and plaza improvements completed
- 2004: BNIM Architects receives AIA Honor Award
- 2021: Added to the National Register of Historic Places (NRHP)
