= Harry Weber (sculptor) =

American sculptor (born 1942)

- Born: June 11, 1942 (age 84); St. Louis, Missouri, U.S.
- Education: Princeton University
- Occupation: Sculptor
- Website: harryweber.com

Harry Weber (born June 11, 1942) is an American sculptor.

== Early life ==
Harry Weber was born in St. Louis, Missouri in 1942 where he attended St. Louis Country Day School. He was educated at Princeton University where he studied art history.

Following his education, Weber served six years in the United States Navy. This included a year on river patrol boats in Vietnam where he compiled a series of drawings chronicling his experiences there. During his service, he was awarded the Bronze Star Medal with V for valor, the Presidential Unit Commendation and the Navy and Marine Corps Combat Ribbon.

== Recognition ==
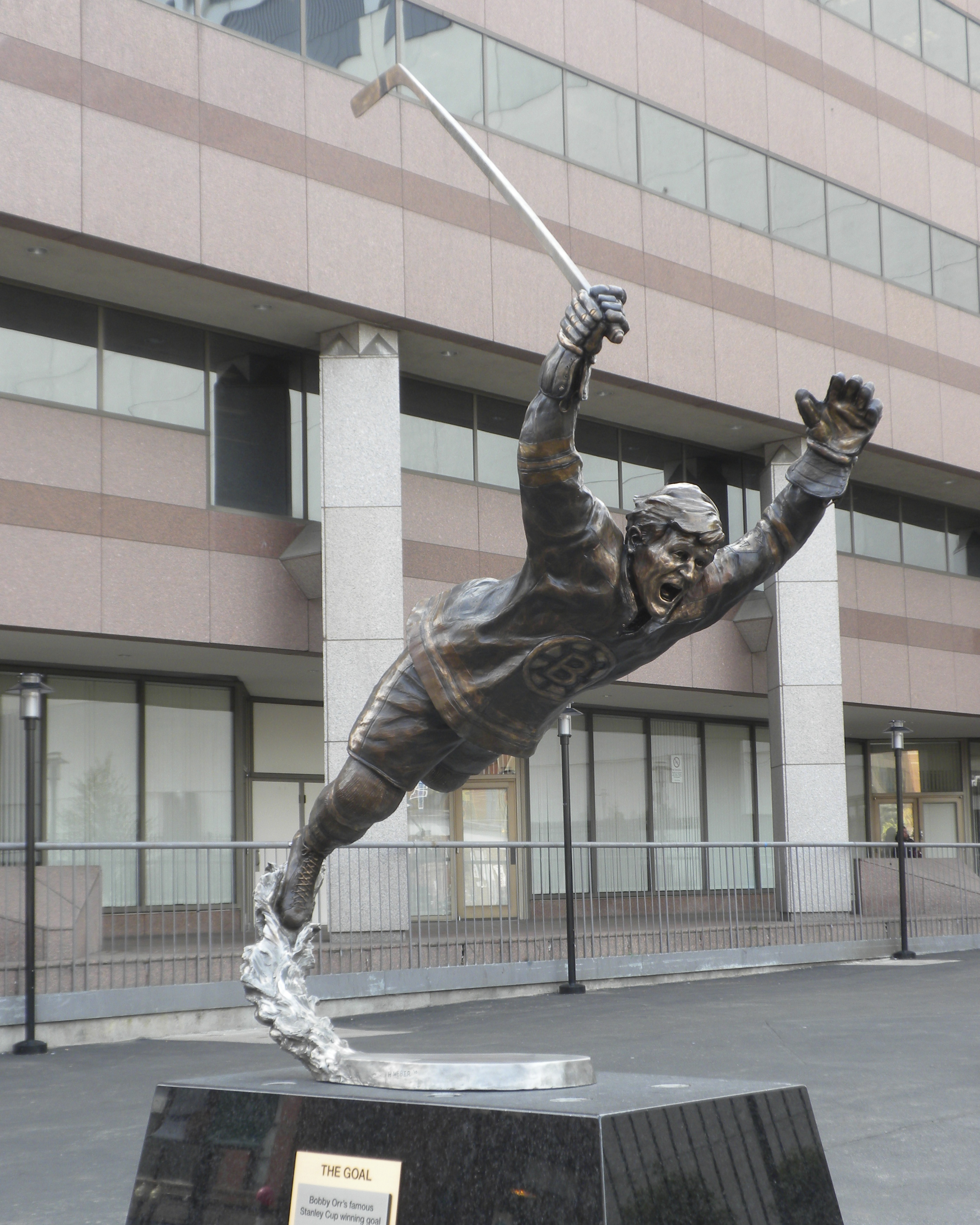
A Larger than life sculpture of Bobby Orr, commissioned by the Boston Bruins and installed outside the main entrance of the Boston Garden in 2010

Weber's sculptures have won major awards at national juried competitions, and are in private collections in the United States and abroad. His work has appeared on the covers of several national magazines.

The Weber body of work includes over 150 large commissioned sculptures on public view in twenty states, the Caribbean, China and Africa. These include historical figures, notables in the arts, politics and sports in twenty-six different cities across the country.

His sculptures have been featured at the Museum of Fine Art in Newport, Rhode Island and are in the permanent collections of the National Dog Museum and the National Baseball Hall of Fame and Museum in Cooperstown, New York. A selection of his Vietnam war sketches are being shown in behalf of the Wounded Warrior Project in Mobile, Alabama.

Two of his sculptural groups have been designated National Lewis and Clark sites by the Federal Parks Department. This includes a twice life sized grouping of Lewis and Clark on the St. Louis Riverfront which commemorated the final celebration of the bicentennial of the expedition. He was selected in 2010, in a national competition, to sculpt a statue of Harriet and Dred Scott, which was unveiled on June 8, 2012, at the Old Courthouse in St. Louis where the initial court cases were heard.

His sculptures of famous sports figures are prominent features at fifteen different professional and amateur stadiums, including Busch Stadium in St. Louis, MO, the TD Garden in Boston, Massachusetts, and Kauffman Stadium in Kansas City, Missouri. In 2011, he was named the Sports Sculptor of the Year by the United States Sports Academy.

He was inducted into the St. Louis Sports Hall of Fame in 2019, and was given a Star on the St. Louis Walk of Fame in 2023.
