= Cementland =

Abandoned public art project in St. Louis

Coordinates: 38°44′03″N 90°12′56″W

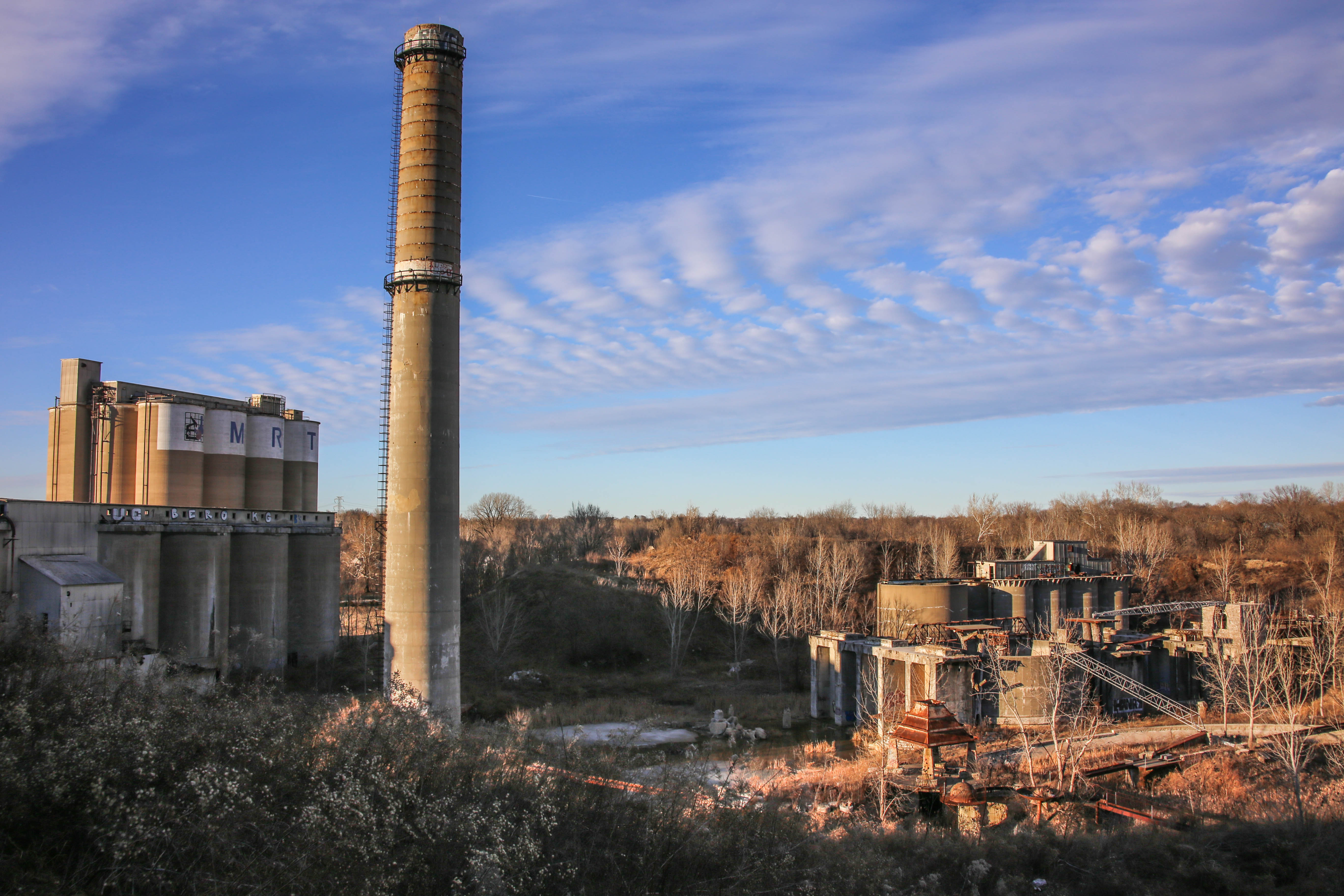
Cementland in 2015

Cementland is an incomplete public art exhibit on the 54-acre site of a former cement factory just north of St. Louis, Missouri. The brainchild of sculptor Bob Cassilly, who also created St. Louis' City Museum, it contains giant concrete sculptures and obsolete machinery, and was planned to have navigable waterways, among many other features.

Much of the landscaping is built on dirt dumped by local construction companies, who used the land as a dump before Cassilly purchased it and who paid him for the privilege. Cassily was funding the construction of Cementland himself; the free material and income from the dumping helps underwrite what he said would "otherwise be an unaffordable project."

The site, outside the city boundaries in the village of Riverview, provides a view of the Gateway Arch. “In the afternoon, when the sun shines on the city, you get this nice reflection. You don’t see all the trash and stuff. It’s the best view of the city,” Cassilly said.

On September 26, 2011, Cassilly was killed at the Cementland site, and it was initially reported that he died when the bulldozer he was driving flipped down a hill. However, in October 2016, medical expert Dr. Arthur Combs concluded that "Almost every rib on both sides of Cassilly's body were broken... Which could not have come from a bulldozer accident." Despite this conclusion, St. Louis Medical Examiner, Michael Graham, said "We will stick with our original findings. We feel this was an accident".

The Cassilly family said that they had hopes to continue construction on the project, but in 2022 they sold the site at auction for $785,000. St. Louis photographer Richard Sprengeler has extensively photographed the site as part of a 2022 series.
