= Queen's Daughters =

Society in St. Louis, Missouri, US

- Daughters Of The Queen Of Heaven, Filiæ Reginæ Coeli
- Formation: December 5, 1889; 136 years ago
- Founder: Mary Hoxsey
- Founded at: St. Louis, Missouri

Queen's Daughters is a religious and charitable society that was founded at St. Louis, Missouri, on December 5, 1889, by Mary Hoxsey, widow of Benjamin W. Hoxsey of Paterson. It was organized to supplement the work done for the poor in their homes by the members of the Society of Saint Vincent de Paul. Several years later, the papal sanction and blessing were accorded (July 17, 1894). The society since spread to numerous parishes of the United States and around 1910 there were thirty-five associations affiliated to those at St. Louis.
