= Freedom Suits Memorial =

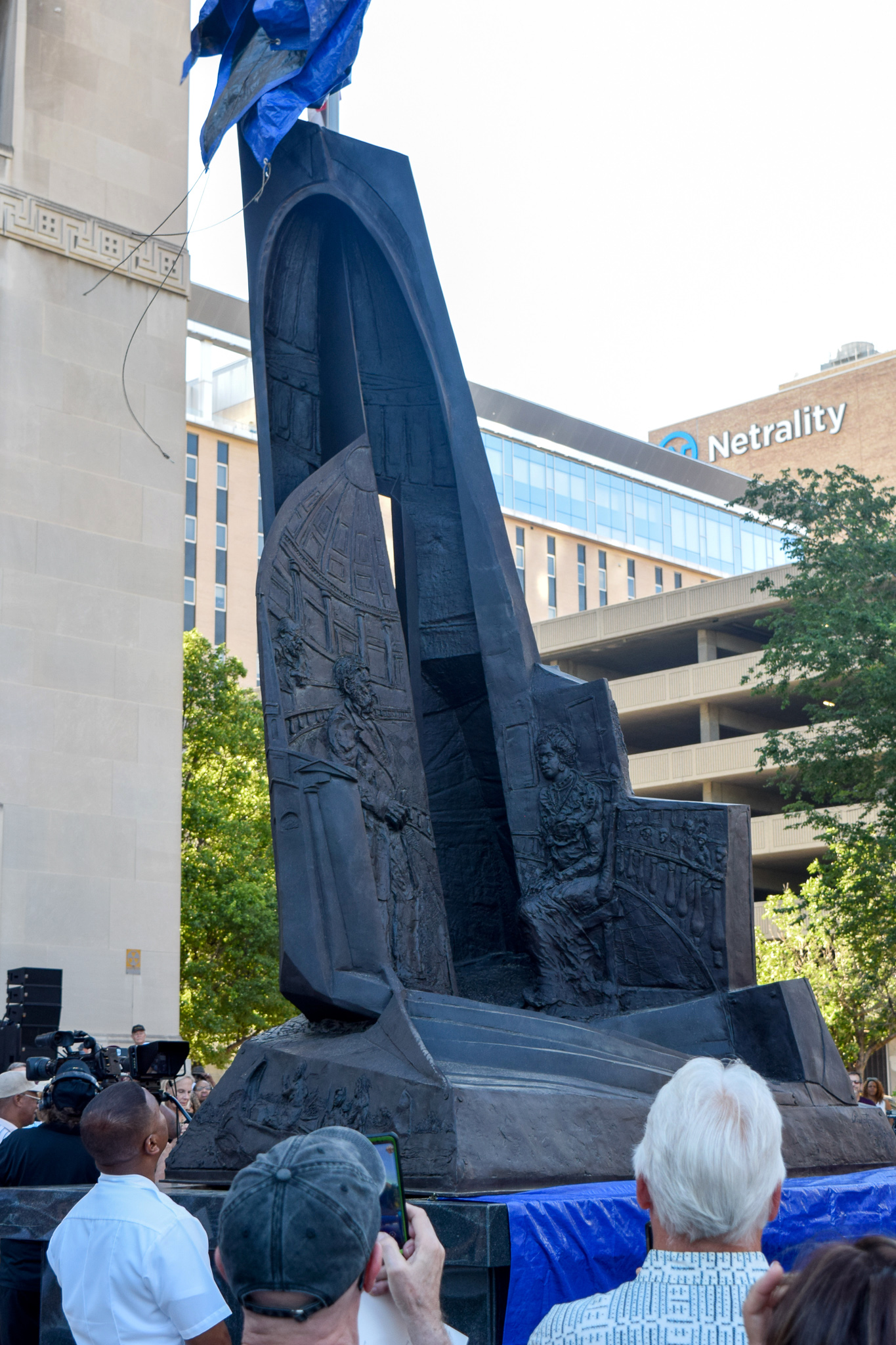
- A photograph of the St. Louis Freedom Suits Memorial taken during its unveiling ceremony.
- Artist: Preston Jackson
- Year: 2022
- Medium: Bronze
- Dimensions: 4.3 m × 2.4 m × 1.2 m (14 ft × 8 ft × 4 ft)
- Location: St. Louis, Missouri, U.S.
- 38°37′39″N 90°11′48″W

The Freedom Suits Memorial is a 14-foot-tall (4.3 m) bronze sculpture in downtown St. Louis, Missouri. Hundreds of people attended the ceremony. It commemorates the freedom suits which were lawsuits filed by slaves against slaveholders to assert claims to freedom.

The memorial was designed by Chicago sculptor Preston Jackson in 2015 and was unveiled in 2022.
