= Hindu Temple of St. Louis =

Hindu temple in Greater St. Louis, Missouri, US

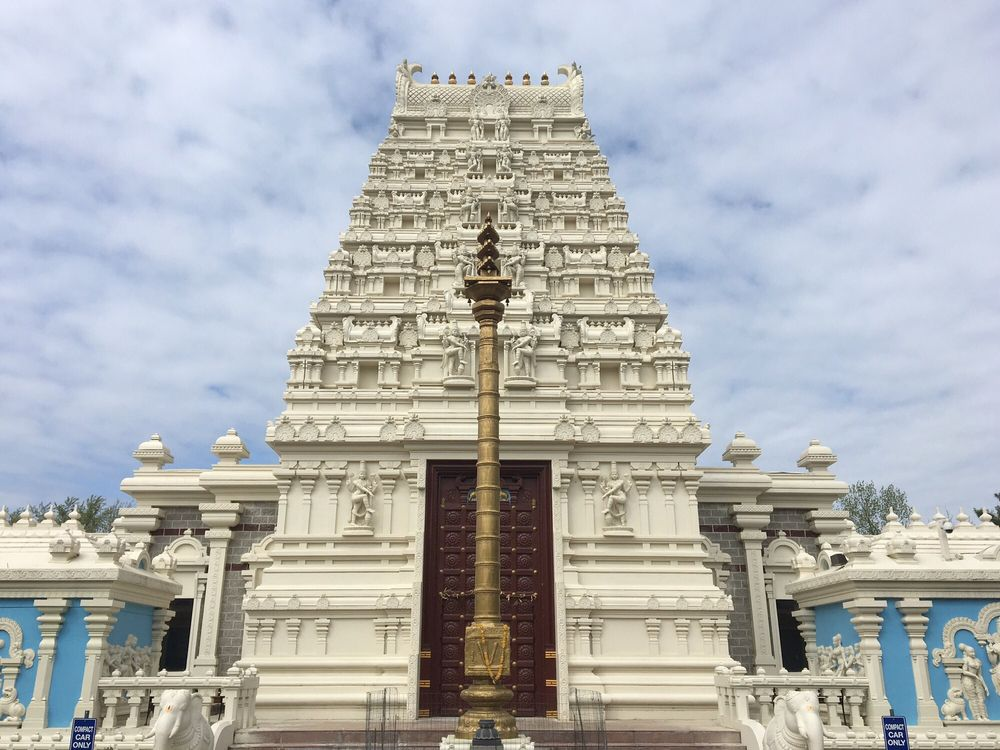

- Location in Missouri

Religion
- Affiliation: Hinduism

Location
- Location: Ballwin
- State: Missouri
- Country: United States
- Interactive map of Hindu Temple of St. Louis
- Coordinates: 38.614725°N 90.499097°W

Architecture
- Completed: 1991

Website
- www.hindutemplestlouis.org

The Hindu Temple of St. Louis is located in Ballwin, Missouri and serves over 14,000 Hindus residing in the St. Louis Area as of 2010. The temple address is 725 Weidman Rd, St. Louis, MO, 63011.

== History ==
The Hindu Temple of St. Louis was formally registered as a Not For Profit Organization in Missouri in 1988. Groundbreaking of the temple commenced on April 21, 1990 with a Bhoomi Pooja and by November 8, 1991, the temple was completed. The first physical deities were installed in 1995, replacing pictures of deities. Mahatma Gandhi Cultural Center was the first building constructed in 1991. In 2000, several sculptors arrived from India to create ornate details on the gopuram. In 2008, Hindu Temple of St. Louis bought a nearby housing complex for $3 Million to expand the annex. This expansion sponsored criticism among local citizens due to the increased traffic, noise pollution and light pollution, impacting citizens who live adjacent to the annex. In 2012, the local subdivision and the temple reached an agreement to build a wall around its newly acquired land and a "15 foot setback".

== Campus ==
The temple currently consists of a worship place, a cultural center, reception area, a cafeteria, a library, a parking lot and an auditorium.

== Vandalism ==
In 2003, two vandals threw Molotov cocktails at the front doors of the Temple but caused no injuries,
