= Billy Morrow Jackson =

American painter

Billy Morrow Jackson (1926–2006) was an American painter.

Jackson was born in Kansas City, Missouri in 1926. He completed his Bachelor of Fine Arts at the St. Louis School of Fine Arts at Washington University in St. Louis, and later received an MFA from University of Illinois Urbana-Champaign, where he later taught. Over the course of his education, Mr. Jackson was taught by Max Beckmann, Fred Conway and Abraham Rattner. In addition to the Bureau of Reclamation's commission, Mr. Jackson received several other government commissions. These include paintings for NASA to record the Apollo space program, and paintings in the state capitol buildings of Olympia, Washington and Springfield, Illinois.

All the paintings that he completed for the Bureau of Reclamation are watercolors, however, Mr. Jackson is probably better known for his oils of the Midwest. After beginning in printmaking, specifically woodcuts and lithographs, he made the shift to painting with Still Life with Postage Stamp in 1955. The expressionism and flat, two-dimensional, patterned prints of his earlier years gave way to increasing naturalism. Realism as a reaction against Abstract Expressionism gained a significant following starting in the late 1960s, the most visible of the movement being the photorealists and the super-realists, artists such as Richard Estes and Chuck Close. While Billy Morrow Jackson was certainly painting in a realist manner, his use of ambiguity (imperfect or rough lines, for example) and his use of light for compositional purposes also linked him to the historic American Luminist school of the 19th century. The Luminists tended to depict landscape scenes (in the tradition of John Constable and Joseph M. W. Turner) with a romantic sensibility, much like Jackson was doing. The sky is a dominant feature in many of Jackson's paintings, pushing the horizon line down towards the bottom of the canvas. The empty fields and solitary farm houses impart a sense of vastness and expanse that is enhanced by his use of perspective. Some of Jackson's later works moved indoors, where he exploited walls and doors to impart depth as well as employing perspective. Jackson's paintings recall the paintings of Andrew Wyeth and Edward Hopper in their use of realism to convey feelings of isolation and vastness.

Jackson died in 2006.
