= Bob Cassilly =

American sculptor, entrepreneur, and creative director (1949–2011)

Robert (Bob) Cassilly
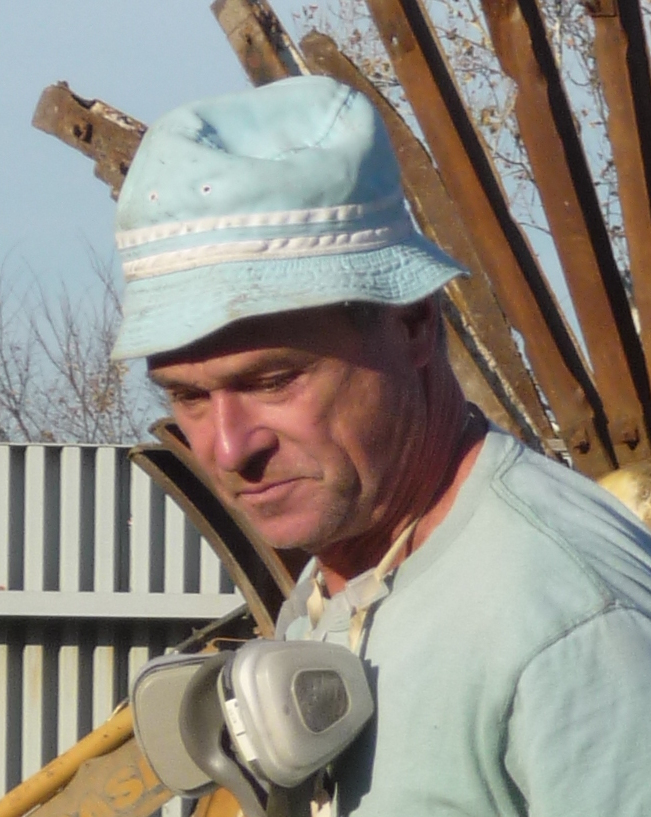
- Bob Cassilly working on a dragon sculpture at Trailnet RiverView Park in St. Louis in 2008
- Born: November 9, 1949; Webster Groves, Missouri, U.S.
- Died: September 26, 2011 (aged 61); St. Louis, Missouri, U.S.
- Education: Fontbonne University
- Occupations: Sculptor, Entrepreneur, and Creative director
- Known for: Founder, City Museum

Robert James Cassilly Jr. (November 9, 1949 – September 26, 2011) was an American sculptor, entrepreneur, and creative director based in St. Louis, Missouri. In 1997, Cassilly founded the idiosyncratic City Museum, which draws over 700,000 visitors a year and is one of the city's leading tourist attractions.

== Early life and education ==
Cassilly was born in Webster Groves, Missouri, to a homemaker and a building contractor. He began skipping school by age 14 to work as an apprentice for a local sculptor, Rudolph Torrini. Cassilly graduated from Vianney High School, then earned a bachelor's degree in art from Fontbonne University in St. Louis.

== Career ==
While at Fontbonne University, Cassilly met and married his first wife, painter and printmaker Cecelia Davidson. In May 1972, the couple honeymooned in Rome. They were visiting St. Peter's Basilica in Vatican City when Laszlo Toth attacked Michelangelo's The Pietà. Cassilly claimed he was the first to act and subdued Toth.

While living in St. Louis, Cassilly and Davidson restored over 36 dilapidated Victorian buildings. These restorations led to the construction of six in-fill townhouses, for which he designed the architectural flourishes. The Manhattan Townhouses, located at 4343 Laclede (1984) and 11-23 North Boyle (1985) in the City's Central West End, feature terracotta adorned with turtles and griffins. He also designed a 12-foot-tall cast stone border fence for Cordage-Nivek's adaptive reuse of the former Dorris Motor Car building (4100 Laclede, 1985). The townhouse project led Cassilly to start making sculptures professionally. He soon became known for his public pieces that depict animals such as turtles and hippos. The couple also built and ran a restaurant in Lafayette Square.

Eventually, they sold the restaurant, which allowed them to move to Hawaii, where Cassilly carved wooden figures.

Cassilly reportedly grew tired of Hawaii and returned to his native St. Louis. There, he met sculptor Gail Soliwoda, whose works include the limestone monument at the Myron and Sonya Glassberg Family Conservation Area. Cassilly divorced Davidson and married Soliwoda.

Cassilly and Soliwoda became business partners. In 1993, they bought a 250,000-square-foot (23,000 m^{2}) complex, which included the International Shoe Building, offices and a 10-story warehouse, for 69 cents per square foot. They renovated the site and opened it in 1997 as the City Museum, helping to spark a renovation boom in downtown St. Louis. The museum includes a shoelace factory, a fire truck, two airplanes, and a Ferris wheel on the roof. The Project for Public Spaces listed the museum among the "Great Public Spaces in the World" in 2005. In 2002, financial obligations forced Cassilly to begin charging visitors a fee to park at the museum. Cassilly hung a sign in the museum's parking lot reading, "Greedy Bob’s Parking Lot."

Cassilly's other works include hippopotamus statues installed at Hippo Playground in Manhattan's Riverside Park in 1993. In 1997, Cassilly also contributed hippo sculptures to Central Park's Safari Playground near W. 91 Street. He designed two turtles for Turtle Park in St. Louis. A giant concrete butterfly, called the Mysterious Monarch, was unveiled in Faust Park outside the Butterfly House, Missouri Botanical Garden in 1997 in Chesterfield, Missouri. Cassilly's giraffe statue, which stands at the entrance to the Dallas Zoo, is the tallest sculpture in Texas at 67½ feet tall. His works for the St. Louis Zoo include the Sea Lion Fountains and a 45-foot squid statue.

In 2000, Cassilly began work on Cementland, a repurposing of a former cement factory on a 54-acre (220,000 m^{2}) site in north St. Louis.

In 2002, Cassilly and Soliwoda divorced.

=== Commissioned sculptures ===
- 1987–1989 dinosaur for Planet Hollywood West-end in Dallas. "Big-Tex Rex" now resides in Amarillo, Texas, at the Big Texan Steak Ranch
- 1987: Marlin Perkins bust at the St. Louis Zoo
- 1991: Six lighted entry markers at the St. Louis Galleria
- 1993: Hippo playground sculptures in Manhattan's Riverside Park
- 1996: Turtle Park sculptures in St. Louis' Forest Park
- 1997: Hippopotamus Park statues at Central Park's Safari Playground in Manhattan
- 1997: Giraffe statue at the Dallas Zoo
- 1998: Mysterious Monarch and Lopatapillar at Faust Park in Chesterfield, Missouri
- 1999: Sea Lion Fountains at the St. Louis Zoo
- Dinosaur at Dallas Planet Hollywood
- Ruins at Roman Rapids ride, Busch Gardens Virginia
- Apple chairs, Webster Groves, Missouri
- 1999: Musical Lion Benches, University City, Missouri

== Death ==
On September 26, 2011, Cassilly died at Cementland. A police investigation found that he died of injuries after the bulldozer he was driving flipped down a hill. Some members of Cassilly's family contested the results of the investigation and hired an independent doctor, Arthur H. Combs, MD (who at the time held a faculty appointment at Washington University School of Medicine in St. Louis) to review the evidence. He concluded that Cassilly was beaten to death, but the St. Louis medical examiner dismissed his evidence and stood by the ruling of accidental death.
