= 2023 Champaign mayoral election =

- April 4, 2023

Nominee	Deborah Frank Feinen	Don Gerard	Azark David Cobbs
Popular vote	6,227	1,601	547
Percentage	74.4%	19.1%	6.5%
- Precinct results Feinen: 50–60% 60–70% 70–80% 80–90%
Mayor before election
Deborah Frank Feinen
Elected mayor
Deborah Frank Feinen

The 2023 Champaign mayoral election was held on April 4, 2023. It elected the mayor of Champaign, Illinois. Incumbent mayor Deborah Frank Feinen won re-election to a third term in a landslide over former mayor Don Gerard and Azark David Cobbs. Feinen had previously defeated both men in 2015 and 2019, respectively. Champaign municipal elections are non-partisan.

== Background ==
Deborah Frank Feinen was first elected mayor in 2015, unseating Don Gerard. In 2019, she was re-elected in a landslide against Azark David Cobbs.

During her second term, Feinen was briefly granted emergency powers in order to lead the City of Champaign's COVID-19 pandemic response.

== General election ==
=== Candidates ===
- Azark David Cobbs, candidate for mayor in 2019
- Deborah Frank Feinen, incumbent mayor (2015–present)
- Don Gerard, former mayor (2011–2015)

=== Results ===
2023 Champaign mayoral election
Candidate	Votes	%
Deborah Frank Feinen	6,227	74.35%
Don Gerard	1,601	19.12%
Azark David Cobbs	547	6.53%
Total votes	8,375	100.00%
