= 2015 Champaign mayoral election =

- April 7, 2015

Nominee	Deborah Frank Feinen	Don Gerard
Popular vote	4,967	3,800
Percentage	41.0%	31.4%
Nominee	Joe Petry	Karen Foster
Popular vote	2,243	1,112
Percentage	18.2%	9.2%
- Precinct results Feinen: 30–40% 40–50% 50–60% Gerard: 30–40% 40–50% 50–60% 60–70% 70–80% Feinen/Gerard Tie
Mayor before election
Don Gerard
Elected mayor
Deborah Frank Feinen

The 2015 Champaign mayoral election was held on April 7, 2015. It elected the mayor of Champaign, Illinois. Incumbent mayor Don Gerard lost re-election to Champaign City Council member Deborah Frank Feinen in a four-way race. Champaign municipal elections are non-partisan.

== Background ==
Don Gerard was first elected mayor in 2011, unseating incumbent mayor Gerald Schweighart.

== General election ==
=== Candidates ===
- Deborah Frank Feinen, Champaign City Council member and former Champaign County board member
- Don Gerard, incumbent mayor (2011–2015)
- Karen Foster
- Joe Petry

=== Results ===
2015 Champaign mayoral election
Candidate	Votes	%
Deborah Frank Feinen	4,967	40.98%
Don Gerard	3,800	31.35%
Joe Petry	2,243	18.15%
Karen Foster	1,112	9.17%
Total votes	12,122	100.00%
