= WLLM =

WLLM may refer to:

- WLLM (AM), a radio station (1370 AM) licensed to serve Lincoln, Illinois, United States
- WLLM-FM, a radio station (90.1 FM) licensed to serve Carlinville, Illinois
