= 2019 Champaign mayoral election =

- April 2, 2019

Nominee	Deborah Frank Feinen	Azark David Cobbs
Popular vote	6,145	1,142
Percentage	84.3%	15.7%
- Precinct results Feinen: 50–60% 60–70% 70–80% 80–90% 90–100%
Mayor before election
Deborah Frank Feinen
Elected mayor
Deborah Frank Feinen

The 2019 Champaign mayoral election was held on April 2, 2019. It elected the mayor of Champaign, Illinois. Incumbent mayor Deborah Frank Feinen won re-election to a second term in a landslide, defeating Azark David Cobbs. Champaign municipal elections are non-partisan.

== Background ==
Deborah Frank Feinen was first elected mayor in 2015, unseating incumbent mayor Don Gerard.

== General election ==
=== Candidates ===
- Azark David Cobbs
- Deborah Frank Feinen, incumbent mayor (2015–present)

=== Results ===
2019 Champaign mayoral election
Candidate	Votes	%
Deborah Frank Feinen	6,145	84.33%
Azark David Cobbs	1,142	15.67%
Total votes	7,287	100.00%
