= Schweighart =

Schweighart is a German surname. Notable people with the surname include:

- Gerald Schweighart (1938–2022), former mayor of Champaign, Illinois, U.S.
- Imelda Schweighart (born 1995), German-Filipino model, singer-songwriter, composer and actress
