= WTSG =

WTSG may refer to:

- WTSG-LD, a low-power television station (channel 33, virtual 10) licensed to serve Tifton, Georgia, United States
- WLLM-FM, a radio station (90.1 FM) licensed to serve Carlinville, Illinois, United States, which held the call sign WTSG from 1997 to 2016
- WFXL, a television station (channel 12, virtual 31) licensed to serve Albany, Georgia, which held the call sign WTSG or WTSG-TV from 1978 to 1989
