= WLUJ =

- Springfield, Illinois; United States
- Frequency: 89.7 MHz
- Branding: Lifting Up Jesus

Programming
- Format: Christian radio

Ownership
- Owner: Great News Radio; (Good News Radio, Inc.)
- Sister stations: WGNJ, WGNN, WLLM, WLLM-FM

History
- Call sign meaning: "Lifting Up Jesus"

Technical information
- Licensing authority: FCC
- Facility ID: 13576
- Class: B1
- ERP: 20,000 watts
- HAAT: 100 meters (330 ft)
- Translator: See § Translators
- Repeater: See § Repeaters

Links
- Public license information: Public file; LMS
- Webcast: Listen live
- Website: wluj.org

WLUJ is an American Christian radio station licensed to Springfield, Illinois, broadcasting on 89.7 FM. The station is owned by Great News Radio, through licensee Good News Radio, Inc.

WLUJ is the flagship station of the "WLUJ Family of Stations". The "WLUJ Family of Stations" includes four full power transmitters and five low powered translators. Full powered stations that carry WLUJ's programming include 96.7 WGNX in Macomb, Illinois, 88.1 WLWJ in Petersburg, Illinois, and 88.3 WRLJ in White Hall, Illinois. As of 2021, WLUJ is managed by Tim Nelson and is located on the west side of Springfield.

== Programming ==
WLUJ's programming consists of Christian talk and teaching, as well as Christian music. Christian talk and teaching programs heard on WLUJ include; Turning Point with David Jeremiah, Love Worth Finding with Adrian Rogers, Thru the Bible with J. Vernon McGee, In Touch with Dr. Charles Stanley, Insight for Living with Chuck Swindoll, Revive our Hearts with Nancy Leigh DeMoss, Grace to You with John MacArthur, Focus on the Family, and In the Market with Janet Parshall.

== History ==
WLUJ began broadcasting on March 17, 1987, and originally broadcast at 97.7 MHz in Petersburg, Illinois (now WQLZ), serving the Springfield area. 89.7 began broadcasting on May 24, 1995, and held the call sign WLGM. The station's call sign stood for "We Love Gospel Music" and it aired inspirational music weekdays and southern gospel weekends. In 2000, WLWJ 88.1 began broadcasting in Petersburg, Illinois. In 2001, 97.7 was sold to Long-Nine, Inc. and WLUJ moved to 89.7. In 2003, WRLJ began broadcasting in White Hall, Illinois. In 2011, WJWR began broadcasting in Bloomington, Illinois, and serves the Bloomington-Normal area, as well as Pontiac, Illinois.

The station was purchased by Good News Radio, Inc. in November 2019. The deal, which also included six sister stations and seven translators, was consummated on February 12, 2020 at a price of $1.1 million.

== Repeaters ==
| Call sign | Frequency | City of license | FID | ERP (W) | HAAT | Class | FCC info |
|---|---|---|---|---|---|---|---|
| WGNX | 96.7 FM | Colchester, Illinois | 164225 | 1,800 | 100 m (328 ft) | A | LMS |
| WLWJ | 88.1 FM | Petersburg, Illinois | 89735 | 6,000 | 100 m (328 ft) | A | LMS |
| WRLJ | 88.3 FM | White Hall, Illinois | 89433 | 2,000 | 75 m (246 ft) | A | LMS |

=== Translators ===
| Call sign | Frequency | City of license | FID | ERP (W) | HAAT | Class | FCC info |
|---|---|---|---|---|---|---|---|
| W228BG | 93.5 FM | Beardstown, Illinois | 144789 | 27 | 64.1 m (210 ft) | D | LMS |
| W284BT | 104.7 FM | Bloomington, Illinois | 138464 | 38 | 56.9 m (187 ft) | D | LMS |
| W261CQ | 100.1 FM | Decatur, Illinois | 37561 | 99 | 32.2 m (106 ft) | D | LMS |
| W228BB | 93.5 FM | Jacksonville, Illinois | 79202 | 120 | 33 m (108 ft) | D | LMS |
| W261AF | 100.1 FM | Lincoln, Illinois | 92803 | 55 | 56.8 m (186 ft) | D | LMS |
