= Triaxial Earthquake and Shock Simulator =

The Triaxial Earthquake and Shock Simulator (TESS) is an experimental 3-dimensional "shake table," is used to test the ability of systems and facilities to survive under realistic conditions of weapons-induced shock and vibration, and earthquake ground motion. TESS serves in a wide variety of testing roles, including testing shock survivability of computer equipment (shown below), computer floors, and shock isolation systems in military facilities; studying the behavior of structural building models and components in seismic environments with a focus on ways to increase the seismic resistance of steel, reinforced concrete, and masonry structures; subjecting full-size electronic systems to simulated transportation and seismic environments; and determining the effects of shipboard vibrations on naval systems.

== Location ==
The TESS is located in Champaign, Illinois, and is operated by the U.S. Army Engineer Research and Development Center (ERDC) Construction Engineering Research Laboratory (CERL). CERL is one of seven ERDC laboratories and ERDC is part of the U.S. Army Corps of Engineers. As an Allied Agency of the University of Illinois Urbana-Champaign, CERL has long worked in partnership with one of the nation's most respected research and engineering institutions. This synergy provides TESS clients with access to complementary advanced research capabilities and multidisciplinary technical expertise.

== Specifications ==
In its biaxial mode, this unique dual-mode shock and vibration test facility simulates a wide range of transient shock vibrations typical of military applications requiring large accelerations over a wide frequency range with moderately heavy test specimens. In the triaxial mode, it can simulate a variety of vibration environments including earthquakes and random vibrations, as well as log-sweep and resonant searches. In this mode, the TESS can test larger specimens over larger displacement ranges more typical of seismic vibrations. The TESS combines a high payload capability with a broad frequency range, high acceleration performance, a wide displacement range, and simultaneous, independent control of up to three axes of vibration. Biaxial performance is rated with a 12,000 lb payload, and the triaxial performance with a 120,000 lb payload. Larger payloads can be tested at lower acceleration levels, while smaller payloads can be tested at up to twice the rated accelerations.

=== Data Acquisition System ===
- 128-channel data acquisition system (future expandability to 512 channels)
- 50,000 samples per second throughput to disk
- Sample-and-hold and anti-alias filter on each channel to prevent time-skewing and eliminate high-frequency noise and aliasing effects
- Software incorporates all test-execution data, documentation, test data, and data management information into a common database for each test performed

== Benefits ==
The TESS provides the capability to test equipment and structural models of various sizes under controlled, realistic shock, seismic, and vibration environments that cannot be economically produced in field tests. The integrated analog and digital systems provide the capability to measure and analyze large volumes of test response data using a variety of time and frequency analysis procedures. The TESS can independently control three axes simultaneously. This provides a more realistic simulation of real-world vibration environments without having to make engineering assumptions about test performance in the unexcited axes.

== Research Areas ==
TESS is most frequently used in four research areas:

1. Facility Evaluation. For example, TESS was used to investigate the influence of flexible diaphragms on masonry buildings subjected to seismic motions.
2. Building Rehabilitation. TESS was used to investigate the applicability of fiber-reinforced polymer (FRP) composite retrofit systems to strengthen unreinforced walls made of concrete masonry units or clay brick.
3. New Facility Design and Construction. These projects are associated with seismic design of new facilities, for example, to investigate cold-formed shear panel behavior under simulated seismic loading.
4. Equipment Qualification and Upgrade Development. TESS is used to investigate the vulnerability of critical equipment subjected to seismic and shock loading, as well as to develop upgrade technology to protect the equipment.

== Example Study using the TESS ==
CERL tested a 250,000-pound Geosynthetics Reinforced Soil (GRS) bridge abutment model for the University of Wisconsin–Milwaukee, with Federal Highway Administration funding. This is the largest model ever tested on the CERL Triaxial Earthquake and Shock Simulator (TESS). The portion of the model bearing on the TESS was 205,000 pounds, and this large mass created unique challenges and control concerns such as excessive pitch when testing longitudinally. The model was successfully tested with sine-sweep and sinusoidal motions up to levels that caused significant damage. Almost 100 data channels were recorded from acceleration, displacement, strain, and pressure transducers. University of Wisconsin–Milwaukee researchers will use the data to evaluate their analytical models and assess the ability of this GRS bridge abutment system for construction in high-seismic areas. University of Wisconsin–Milwaukee hopes to obtain funding for testing a second specimen with biaxial lateral and vertical motions from the 1940 El-Centro earthquake.
