= Lincoln Land express =

American bus company (1999–2012)

LincolnLand Express, Inc. better known as LEX, was a shuttle and charter bus company that served all of the continental US, but primarily the Midwest. LEX ran shuttles between Champaign, Illinois, and the Chicago area including downtown Chicago and both O'Hare and Midway airports, as well as service to Bloomington, Illinois, and Indianapolis International Airport. The company operated from 1999 to 2012.

In December 2012, the company was ordered to close by the Federal Motor Carrier Safety Administration (FMCSA). The company's president said that the company had been targeted by government officials. He later announced that the company would close down permanently. LEX affiliate Illini Tours was shut down by the FMCSA on May 15, 2013.
