= Don Gerard =

Mayor of Champaign
- In office May 2011 – May 2015
- Preceded by: Gerald Schweighart
- Succeeded by: Deborah Frank Feinen

Personal details
- Born: October 31, 1965 Chicago, Illinois
- Party: Democratic
- Spouse: Jillanna Mercer (Divorce pending)
- Children: Two children; three step-children
- Education: illinois.edu
- Occupation: Overnight staff C-U at Home homeless service organization
- Profession: Retired Facilities manager Musician; Grounds crew, part-time, Chicago Cubs

Don Gerard (born October 31, 1965) is the former mayor of the city of Champaign, Illinois, and musician.

== Early life and work ==
Gerard was born October 31, 1965, in Chicago, Illinois. He moved to Champaign, Illinois, in 1968, where he attained the rank of Eagle Scout in local Boy Scout Troop 7. He attended the University of Illinois at Urbana-Champaign for a short time.

Prior to and while serving as Champaign's mayor he worked as a facilities manager at the University of Illinois at Urbana–Champaign.

== Music ==
Gerard has played in a number of local rock bands, including The Farmboys (with Adam Schmitt), The Bowery Boys (with Leroy Bach), The Moon Seven Times (with Lynn Canfield, Henry Frayne, and Brendan Gamble) on Roadrunner Records, and Steve Pride and His Blood Kin (with Jay Bennett). He was also a member of the short-lived skate rock band McWilson.

During his tenure as mayor he would often perform on stage with local and national acts such as playing "Gloria" with REO Speedwagon. He also played with others under the name The Self-Righteous Brothers, which included an opening set before Dave Pirner and contributing a song to a Buzz Magazine compilation.

== Mayor ==
=== Elections ===
On April 5, 2011, Gerard defeated three-term and twelve-year incumbent Gerald Schweighart, receiving 4,324 votes (51.4%) to Schweighart's 4,092 votes (48.6%). His four-year term began in May 2011 and ended in 2015. Upon his election, he promised responsible fiscal management without big impacts on essential city services.

In 2015, Gerard was defeated by Deborah Frank Feinen in his bid for re-election. He received 31.35 percent of the votes in a four-way race.

Gerard ran for a nonconsecutive term in the 2023 Champaign mayoral election. He lost to Feinen again in a landslide.

=== Actions ===
On his first day in office Mayor Gerard, despite facing many economic and budget challenges, announced the city would partner with Champaign Unit 4 School District to create a Summer Youth Employment Program. The program was an unequivocal success and continues to this day.

Acting upon a request by two seniors in the University of Illinois Gies College of Business, the founders of the Cracked Truck, Gerard directed city staff to explore and institute a food truck pilot program

As liquor commissioner, Gerard issued emergency orders restricting the distribution of alcohol on "Unofficial St. Patrick's Day" (celebrated by students at the nearby University of Illinois) in February 2012 and February 2013. Gerard subsequently worked with the University of Illinois, law enforcement and other agencies to focus on the event's safety.

Responding to a campaign by Champaign residents, Gerard and the city council voted to allow chickens to be kept within city limits for egg production. Gerard reported that he received more emails on the chicken issue than any tax issue in his first term.

In an effort to provide lower costs and increase renewable electric source usage Gerard lead effort to enroll the City of Champaign in a municipal electric aggregation program

Gerard has explored bringing a minor league baseball team to the city in 2011, but those plans remain unexecuted.

During his term the City of Champaign amended rules to allow public comment on any topic at all meetings

== Policies ==
=== Environmentalism ===
Together with the mayor of nearby Urbana, Laurel Prussing, Gerard worked to get the Mahomet Aquifer designated as a Sole Source Aquifer by the EPA. This designation is intended to help prevent contamination and overuse.

Gerard participated in several attempts to reduce the use of disposable plastic bags. In July 2012, he traveled to Chicago to help fight a bill that would ban local municipalities from restricting their use. The bill was vetoed by Governor Pat Quinn in August.

=== Homeless advocacy ===
For one night during each of his four years in office, Gerard spent the night sleeping on the sidewalk to raise money and awareness for the C-U at Home fundraiser "One Winter Night." In 2015, he appeared on Jay Mohr's program on Fox Sports Radio and garnered Mohr's support for the organization as well as a $1,000 donation.

=== Same-sex marriage ===
Mayor Gerard was an active proponent of same-sex marriage in the State of Illinois, saying in an interview, "I'll put my voice in for marriage equality 24 hours a day. I think that's something I believe in". To this end, Gerard was an early signatory of the Mayors for the Freedom to Marry petition. Despite Champaign receiving an above-average score on the Human Rights Campaign "municipal equality index" for LGBT issues, Mayor Gerard said he would continue to seek ways to improve.

=== Immigration ===
In October 2013, Mayor Gerard joined with other mayors from around Illinois, including Chicago Mayor Rahm Emanuel, in urging the Illinois congressional delegation to vote for immigration reform. Said Gerard, "No matter from where a talented individual may come, we should be able to afford them the opportunity to keep their talents here if they so wish".

=== Keys to the City ===
Gerard presented Keys to the City to citizens of and guests to Champaign who made contributions to the city. Recipients included May Berenbaum, Steve Carter, Will Leitch, Roger Ebert, Dr. Ollie Watts Davis, Lou Henson, and Viktor Krauss.

== Controversy ==
In 2013, while serving as Mayor for Champaign, Gerard was sued by a former campaign advisor and ex-girlfriend. A Champaign County judge issued a protective order in the case, ordering Gerard to have no contact with the campaign advisor and ex for two years. Gerard was accused of failing to pay agreed upon consulting fees for campaign advice, harassment, and threatening ongoing, taxpayer-funded harassment of the individual by the City of Champaign. Gerard settled the case later that year.[37][38][39][40][41]

A local musician also filed an order of protection after a public argument with Gerard at a music festival. However, the request was denied.

In 2015, Gerard engaged in a "heated" Twitter back-and-forth with ESPN commentator Dan Dakich. The incident resulted in an appearance on Jay Mohr's sports talk radio show.

== Personal life ==
In 2019, Gerard married Jillanna Mercer, a clinical counselor who overcame substance abuse. The two are open about their sobriety and publicly share their stories to motivate others. Gerard celebrated three years of sobriety in 2022. As of September 2026, Gerard had sued Mercer for divorce.

Gerard won Illini Media's "Best Personality" award in 2013 after coming in as runner-up in 2012.

As Mayor, Gerard attended local Eagle Scout ceremonies, as well as serving on the board of directors for the local Prairielands Council of the Boy Scouts of America.

== Electoral history ==
2011 City of Champaign Mayor general election results
Candidate	Votes	%
Don Gerard	4,324	51.38
Gerald J. Schweighart (incumbent)	4,092	48.62
Total votes	8,416	100.00

2015 City of Champaign Mayor general election results
Candidate	Votes	%
Deborah Frank Feinen	4,987	40.98
Don Gerard (incumbent)	3,813	31.34
Joe Petry	2,254	18.52
Karen Foster	1,114	9.16
Total votes	12,168	100.00

2023 City of Champaign Mayor general election results
Candidate	Votes	%
Deborah Frank Feinen	6,227	74.35
Don Gerard (incumbent)	1,601	19.12
Azark David Cobbs	547	6.53
Total votes	8,375	100.00

== See also ==
- List of mayors of Champaign, Illinois
