= WGNX =

Repeater of WLUJ, Springfield, IL
- Colchester, Illinois; United States
- Broadcast area: Macomb, Illinois
- Frequency: 96.7 MHz
- Branding: WLUJ

Programming
- Format: Christian
- Affiliations: MBN

Ownership
- Owner: Patricia Van Zandt

History
- First air date: 2007

Technical information
- Licensing authority: FCC
- Facility ID: 164225
- Class: A
- ERP: 1,800 watts
- HAAT: 100.0 meters (328.1 ft)
- Transmitter coordinates: 40°23′54″N 90°43′55″W

Links
- Public license information: Public file; LMS
- Webcast: Listen Live
- Website: https://www.wluj.org/

WGNX (96.7 FM) is an American radio station licensed to Colchester, Illinois, United States. The station is currently owned by Patricia Van Zandt. The station broadcasts a Christian format including some programming from the Moody Broadcasting Network.

In January 2005, Patricia E. Van Zandt applied to the Federal Communications Commission (FCC) for a construction permit for a new broadcast radio station. The FCC granted this permit on June 8, 2007, with a scheduled expiration date of June 8, 2010. The new station was assigned call sign "WGNX" on July 16, 2007. After construction and testing were completed, the station was granted its broadcast license on October 31, 2007.
