= Champaign City Building =

Building in Champaign, Illinois, USA

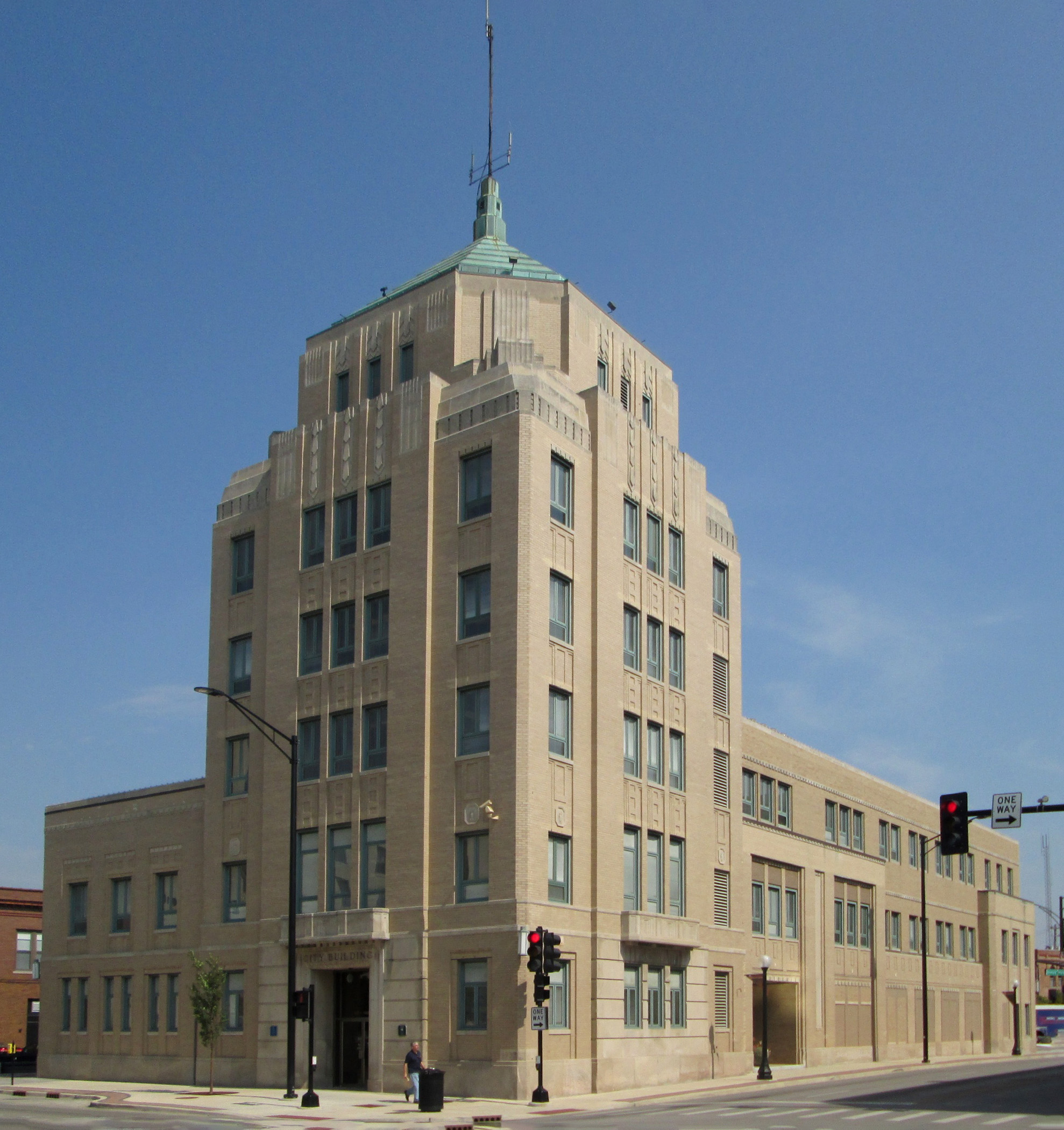
- Champaign City Building from the west

- Location within Illinois

General information
- Status: Champaign Landmark (designated July 18, 2005)
- Architectural style: Art Deco
- Location: 102 North Neil Street; Champaign, Illinois; USA
- Coordinates: 40°06′59″N 88°14′36″W
- Construction started: 1935
- Completed: 1937

Design and construction
- Architect: George Ramey

The Champaign City Building serves as a symbol of the city, with its likeness featured on the city logo. Designated a Champaign Landmark on July 18, 2005, the ornate decoration, art deco architecture, and copper roof distinguish the building as one of the most recognizable in downtown Champaign. The main inspiration for the building's art deco design was Los Angeles City Hall.

== History ==
Land for the original City Hall was donated to the city of Champaign in 1888 by David Bailey, who was a charter founder of the First National Bank of Champaign. It is believed that he donated the land due to the lot's odd shape, and his inability to develop the land. Bailey also insisted that the city must develop a building worth no less than $5,000 within a year of his donation. The city, in turn, built a multi-purpose structure that housed the Police and Fire Departments, an auditorium, a library, and a chamber and meeting room for the City Council.

Within almost 40 years, the building was in such poor condition that the City Council voted to demolish the multi-purpose building and in its place the current City Building was constructed from 1935-1937.

== Current use ==
Currently, the City Building serves as Champaign's City Hall and includes the City Council Chambers and administrative offices.

== See also ==
- List of mayors of Champaign, Illinois
