= WGNN =

Coordinates: 40°20′21″N 88°24′18″W

- Fisher, Illinois; United States
- Broadcast area: Champaign-Urbana; East Central Illinois
- Frequency: 102.5 MHz
- Branding: Great News Radio

Programming
- Format: Christian radio

Ownership
- Owner: Good News Radio, Inc.
- Sister stations: WGNJ, WLUJ, WLLM (AM), WLLM-FM

History
- First air date: April 7, 1996

Technical information
- Licensing authority: FCC
- Facility ID: 58449
- Class: A
- ERP: 6,000 watts
- HAAT: 100 meters (330 ft)

Links
- Public license information: Public file; LMS
- Webcast: Listen live
- Website: greatnewsradio.org

WGNN is a Christian radio station licensed to Fisher, Illinois, broadcasting on 102.5 FM. WGNN serves East-Central Illinois, including the Champaign-Urbana area. WGNN is also heard on locally in Champaign and Urbana on 103.9 FM through translator W280DE, and is heard locally in Clinton, Illinois on 97.1 through translator W246BD. The station is owned by Good News Radio, Inc.

== Translators ==
Call sign	Frequency	City of license	FID	ERP (W)	Class	FCC info
W280DE	103.9 FM	Champaign, Illinois	84770	120	D	LMS
W246BD	97.1 FM	Clinton, Illinois	138468	38	D	LMS
