= WKJR =

- Rantoul, Illinois; United States
- Broadcast area: Champaign-Urbana, Illinois
- Frequency: 1460 kHz
- Branding: Radio Variedades

Programming
- Language: Spanish
- Format: Spanish variety

Ownership
- Owner: Ruben's Productions, Inc.

History
- First air date: February 1, 1963
- Former call signs: WRTL (1962–1990); WUFI (1990–1994); WBAN (1994–1995); WJCI (1995–2006)

Technical information
- Licensing authority: FCC
- Facility ID: 57467
- Class: D
- Power: 500 watts day; 65 watts night
- Transmitter coordinates: 40°18′37.1″N 88°12′54.2″W
- Translator: 106.5 W293DB (Champaign)

Links
- Public license information: Public file; LMS
- Website: www.radiovariedades1460.com

WKJR (1460 AM, "Radio Variedades") is a radio station broadcasting a Spanish variety music format. It is licensed to serve Rantoul, Illinois, and broadcasts to the Champaign, Illinois, area. The station, established in 1963, is currently owned by Ruben's Productions, Inc.

The station was assigned the WKJR call sign by the Federal Communications Commission on September 29, 2006.

WKJR was the former call sign of a now-defunct radio station at 1520 AM in Muskegon Heights, Michigan.
