= Champaign Downtown Commercial District =

Historic district in Illinois, United States

- U.S. National Register of Historic Places
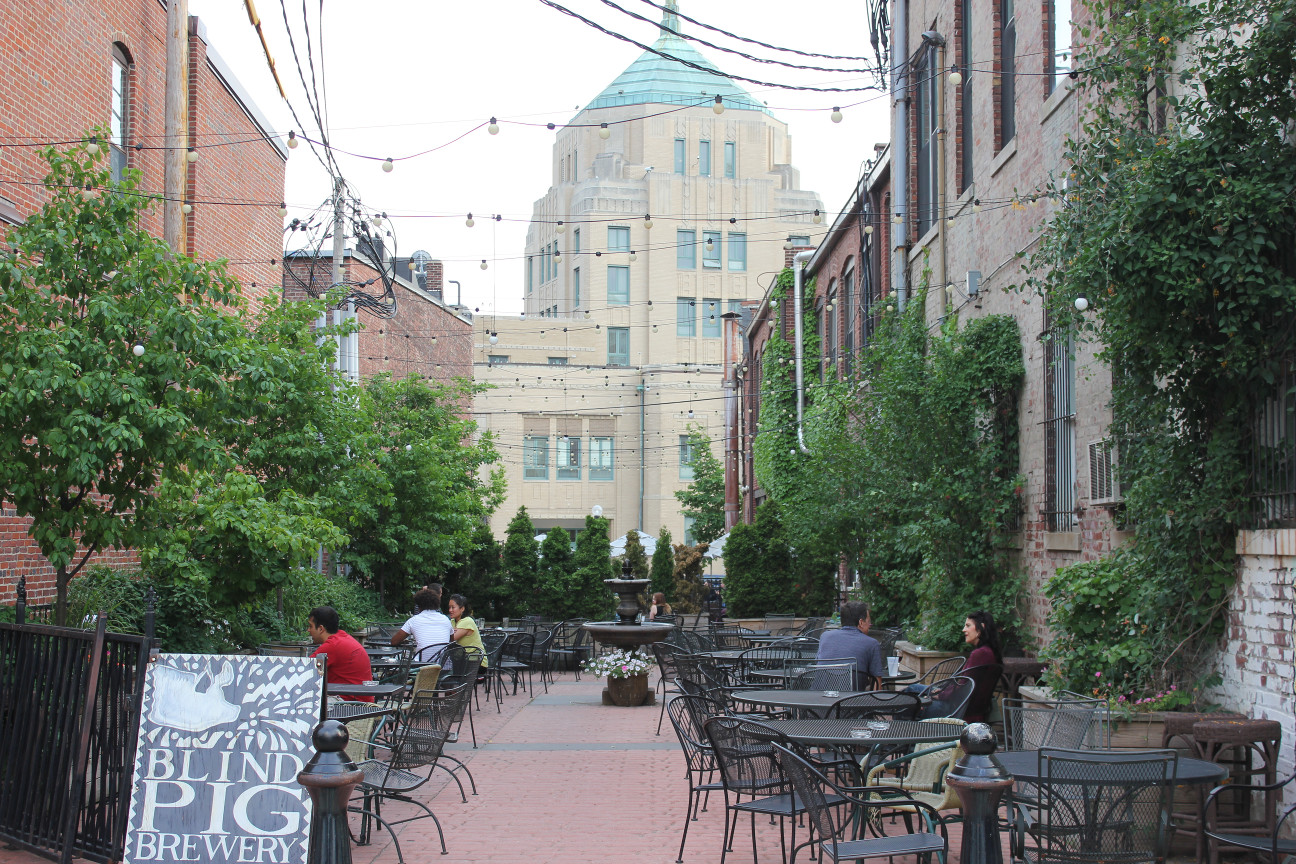
- The City Building as seen from a pedestrian alley

- Location within Illinois Location within the United States
- Location: Former ICRR & Main St.; Neil St.; Taylor, Bailey, University; and ICRR, Champaign, Illinois
- Coordinates: 40°07′02″N 88°14′32″W
- Area: 19.4 acres (7.9 ha)
- NRHP reference No.: 100004912
- Added to NRHP: January 24, 2020

The Champaign Downtown Commercial District is a commercial historic district encompassing 19.4 acres (7.9 ha) in downtown Champaign, Illinois. The district includes some of the oldest parts of the city's downtown, and its buildings represent the city's development in the late nineteenth and early twentieth centuries. Champaign was founded in the 1850s when the Illinois Central Railroad added a station in a rural area west of neighboring Urbana and the town formed around it; the oldest buildings in the district date from the following decade. Several buildings connected to the Illinois Central are included in the district. The opening of the University of Illinois at Urbana–Champaign in 1867 furthered Champaign's growth, and development in the downtown commercial district continued steadily through 1940. The district's commercial buildings exhibit a variety of building types and architectural styles, including Italianate, Art Deco, and various revival styles. Champaign's City Building and other local government buildings are also part of the district.

The district was added to the National Register of Historic Places on January 24, 2020.
