= Cattle Bank =

United States historic place

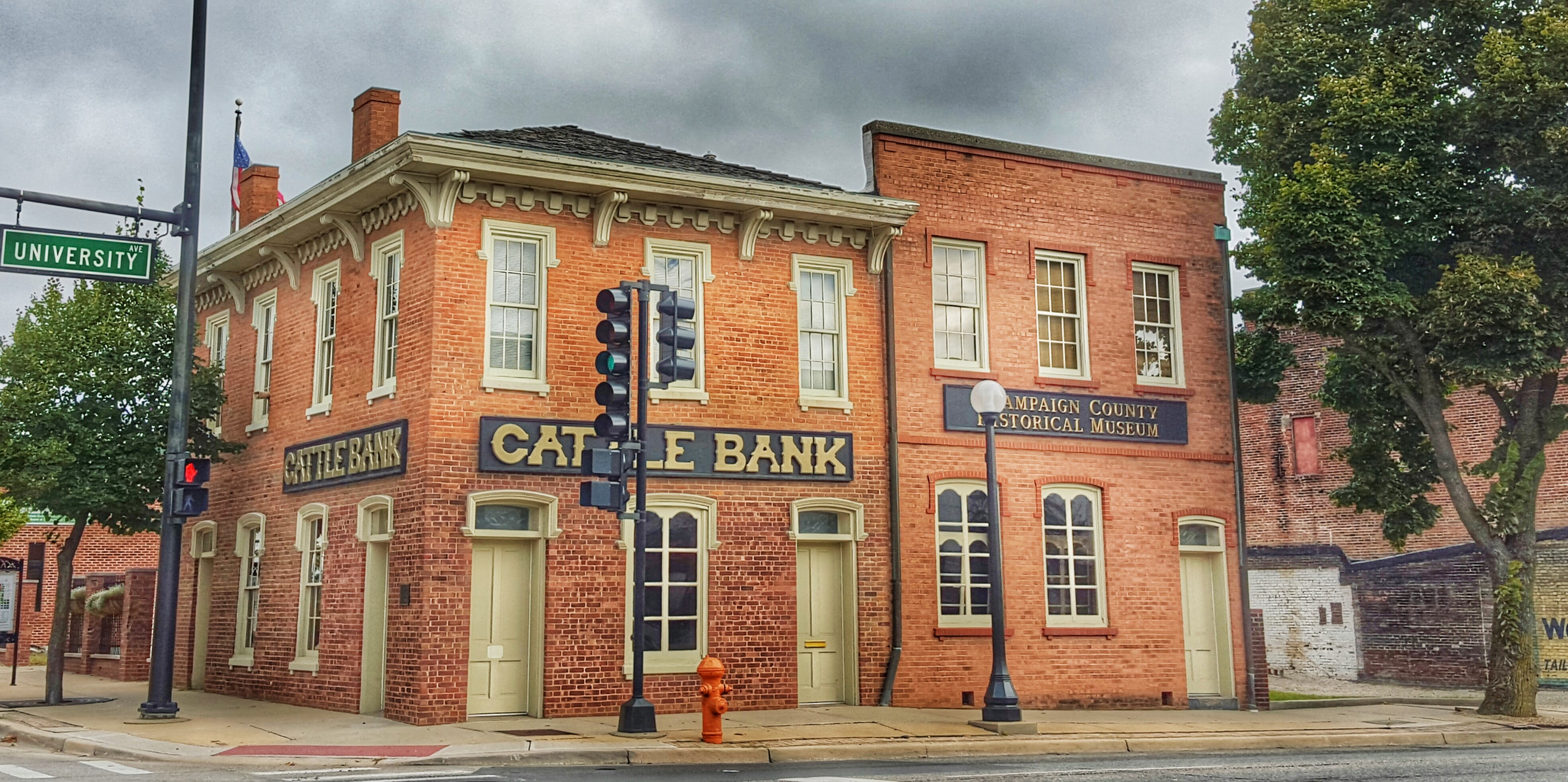
- The Cattle Bank, 2016
- Interactive map of the Cattle Bank area
- Alternative names: Champaign County History Museum

General information
- Type: Commercial bank
- Architectural style: Italianate
- Location: 102 E. University Ave., Champaign, Illinois
- Construction started: 1856
- Completed: 1858
- Renovated: 1982–83
- Owner: Champaign County History Museum
- Cattle Bank
- U.S. National Register of Historic Places
- Coordinates: 40°06′59.4″N 88°14′18.9″W
- Area: 0.8 acres (0.32 ha)
- NRHP reference No.: 75000642
- Added to NRHP: August 19, 1975

The Cattle Bank is a historic bank building located at 102 E. University Ave. in Champaign, Illinois. Built in 1858, it is the oldest documented commercial structure in Champaign. It opened as a branch of the Grand Prairie Bank of Urbana, Illinois. Champaign was the southern terminus of a railroad line to Chicago, so cattle raisers from the surrounding area drove their cattle to Champaign to ship them to the Chicago market. The Cattle Bank provided banking and loan services to these cattlemen. The building housed a bank for only three years. During that time, U.S. President Abraham Lincoln is known to have cashed a check there. From 1861 to 1971, the building housed several commercial tenants. It was added to the National Register of Historic Places in 1975 and renovated in 1983. Since 2001, the Cattle Bank has been home to the Champaign County History Museum.

== History ==
In 1854, the Illinois Central Railroad laid track 2 miles (3.2 km) west of Urbana, Illinois. In 1855, the town of West Urbana (renamed to Champaign in 1860) was founded. In the years before the railroad's arrival, farmers raised large herds of cattle on the area's prairies, and they marketed their product by taking them to Indianapolis or Chicago via cattle drives. The arrival of the railroad promised quick shipments to Chicago.

In 1856, seeking to capitalize on the drastic change to the cattle industry in Illinois, the Grand Prairie Bank opened a temporary branch in the new town. In 1857, the bank's directors constructed a two-story brick building in the Italianate style for the branch. In 1858, the temporary bank location was closed permanently and the, now finished, Cattle Bank conducted the business of the branch. Only a few years later, one cattle baron imported cattle infected with hoof-and-mouth disease, and as a result of the outbreak, the cattle industry collapsed in central Illinois. On June 17, 1861, a victim of the economic crisis, the Cattle Bank dissolved.

From 1865 to the 1870s, Nicholas Miller used the building as a mineral water manufacturer. It was then leased and operated as drug and grocery store until 1893, when it was sold to the McGraw family and then known as McGraw Grocery until 1936. Local pharmacist William Kuesink purchased the property in 1936 and moved in his drug store, which occupied the building until 1951. It was then sold again and was rebranded as Heimlicher's Sundries, another drug store, which was the building's final commercial tenant.

In 1971, a fire nearly destroyed the building and rendered it unusable. Developers marked the building for demolition but were obstructed by a group later called the Preservation and Conservation Association of Champaign County (PACA), which was identifying historic sites in Champaign County in association with the Champaign County History Museum. The group successfully prevented the building's destruction by having it added to the National Register of Historic Places on August 19, 1975.

In 1977, the Champaign City Council purchased the building from Joseph Trautman for $14,500. Later in September 1981, PACA submitted a proposal to the city requesting to take over the restoration of the building. Their request was granted. Later that year, the group secured a federal grant and a $50,000 low-interest loan to help pay for the project, which began in March 1982. The project combined the original building with the neighboring Oakley building; it was finished in 1983.

== Modern use ==
The Cattle Bank building has been the home of the Champaign County History Museum since 2001. Founded in 1972 and open for exhibition in 1974, the museum originally occupied the Wilber Mansion located at 709 W. University Ave. in Champaign, Illinois. The museum sold the mansion to a private buyer in 1997, and the proceeds were used to purchase the Cattle Bank building. The move drastically reduced the space in which the museum could display its collection. There are only five usable display areas, meaning that the museum can showcase only about one percent of its collection at any given time. The rest sits in storage at a nearby facility.

== See also ==
- History of rail transportation in the United States
- National Register of Historic Places listings in Champaign County, Illinois
- List of museums in Illinois
- Banking in the United States
