= WGNJ =

Coordinates: 40°05′16″N 87°53′42″W

- St. Joseph, Illinois; United States
- Broadcast area: Champaign-Urbana; Danville, Illinois; East-Central Illinois; West-Central Indiana
- Frequency: 89.3 MHz
- Branding: Great News Radio

Programming
- Format: Christian radio

Ownership
- Owner: Great News Radio; (Good News Radio, Inc.)
- Sister stations: WGNN, WLUJ

Technical information
- Licensing authority: FCC
- Facility ID: 13927
- Class: B
- ERP: 50,000 watts
- HAAT: 140 meters (460 ft)

Links
- Public license information: Public file; LMS
- Webcast: Listen live
- Website: greatnewsradio.org

WGNJ is a Christian radio station licensed to St. Joseph, Illinois, broadcasting on 89.3 FM. WGNN serves East-Central Illinois, including the Champaign-Urbana, and Danville, Illinois areas, as well as West-Central Indiana, including Covington, Indiana. The station is owned by Great News Radio, through licensee Good News Radio, Inc., and is managed by Mark Burns.

== Relay stations ==
Since June 2020, following Good News Radio's purchase of WLUJ in Springfield, WGNJ's programming has been simulcast on five different frequencies in that area.

Call sign	Frequency	City of license	FID	ERP (W)	HAAT	Class	FCC info
WJWR	90.3 FM	Bloomington, Illinois	93641	18,000	99.7 m (327 ft)	B1	LMS
W284BT	104.7 FM	Bloomington, Illinois	138464	38	56.9 m (187 ft)	D	LMS
WLLM	1370 FM	Lincoln, Illinois	9963	1,000	0 m (0 ft)	D	LMS
WLLM-FM	90.1 FM	Carlinville, Illinois	28303	5,000	90 m (295 ft)	A	LMS
W287BP	105.3 FM	Lincoln, Illinois	138361	100	59.8 m (196 ft)	D	LMS
