= State Farm Research and Development Center =

US research center

The State Farm Research and Development Center opened in January 2005 at the Research Park of the University of Illinois Urbana-Champaign. The insurance company State Farm has been involved in academic programming, student assistance and research at U of I for over 35 years, but this facility allows for of college interns working on projects to benefit the company as a whole, while students get to apply what they learn in class to business problems.

== Departments and Majors ==
The Research & Development Center (RDC) is located about 50 miles (80 km) from State Farm’s Corporate Headquarters making it easy to communicate back and forth on projects. This location allows State Farm associates to interact with the campus community and provide real-world education opportunities to students. The RDC houses three main departments or areas. The Actuary works with pricing insurance, Systems works with information technology, and Strategic Resources department works with corporate research functions. There are also interns working in the MAGNet program.

The Research & Development Center hires University of Illinois students for fall, spring, and summer internships from a variety of majors and backgrounds. The RDC started with 16 interns and four full-time staff members, but has expanded to house up to 70 interns and 14 full-time staff. Some of the majors that have been employed at the RDC are Actuarial Science, Statistics, Computer Science, Accountancy, Engineering, Mathematics, Finance, Economics, Media Studies, Communication, Advertising, Marketing, Business Administration, Urban Planning, Political Science, and Psychology. The RDC paid internship runs part-time around 10–15 hours/week during the fall and spring semesters, and full-time in the summer.

== Expansion ==
In 2006, the Research and Development Center facility doubled in size, to nearly 6,000 square feet (560 m^{2}). 2007 saw more growth as the Center for Consumer Feedback opened adding another 3,400 square feet (320 m^{2}).

In January 2007, State Farm was announced as a Private Sector Partner for the National Center for Supercomputing Applications (NCSA) located at U of I. Interns began working Research Center internships located at NCSA the following summer and continue on today.

In the fall of 2009 the Research & Development Center underwent a major expansion adding over 8,600 square feet (800 m^{2}).

== MAGNet ==
Students have an opportunity to apply analytical skills to State Farm business issues through MAGNet, short for the Modeling and Analytic Graduate Network. Students in MAGNet are expected to enroll in a new master's curriculum created via a relationship between State Farm and the U of I's Statistics Department. MAGNet is similar to a 50% graduate assistantship as students work at the Research & Development Center 20 hours per week during academic semesters and receive a pay rate similar to that of graduate assistants at the university. Students are also offered tuition assistance while working in MAGNet. Those staying on in the summer will work full time and receive higher pay. Interested students apply in the fall of their senior year and begin work the summer before their graduate program begins.

== Center for Consumer Feedback ==
Another portion of the Research & Development Center is the Center for Consumer Feedback (CCF). This part of the Research & Development Center mostly hires students or community members on a part-time basis and not as part of an internship. The center collects consumer research via phone and online surveys. Hiring processes for the CCF are conducted through Spherion.

== Name Change ==
In the second half of 2009 the State Farm Research Center officially changed its name to the State Farm Research and Development Center. The addition of "and Development" came about from a natural evolution in the work being done at the center. When founded in 2005, most interns produced whitepapers based on Internet and other types of research. However, by 2009 Research Center interns were also frequently involved in developing application prototypes. The focus had shifted from pure research activities to research and development.

== Recognition ==
Computerworld selected State Farm as one of the top 100 workplaces for information technology (IT) professionals in its 2008 rankings. Research completed at the Research & Development Center is cited as one of the major reasons to work there.

This year's rankings were based on a comprehensive questionnaire regarding company offerings in categories such as benefits, diversity, career development, training, and retention. In addition to this year's company portion of the survey, Computerworld randomly surveyed employees to collect data on employee satisfaction with management, benefits, workplace culture, compensation, and job duties.

This is the second year in a row State Farm has been named in these rankings.
