= WLLM (AM) =

- Lincoln, Illinois; United States
- Broadcast area: Central Illinois
- Frequency: 1370 kHz
- Branding: Great News Radio

Programming
- Format: Christian radio

Ownership
- Owner: Great News Radio; (Good News Radio, Inc.)
- Sister stations: WGNJ, WGNN, WJWR, WLLM-FM, WLUJ

History
- First air date: April 1951
- Former call signs: WPRC (1951–1995); WNCY (1995); WPRC (1995–1996); WVAX (1996–1999)
- Call sign meaning: Lincoln Land Memories

Technical information
- Licensing authority: FCC
- Facility ID: 9963
- Class: D
- Power: 1,000 watts (day); 35 watts (night)
- Transmitter coordinates: 40°08′24″N 89°23′10″W
- Translator: 105.3 W287BP (Lincoln)

Links
- Public license information: Public file; LMS
- Webcast: Listen live
- Website: greatnewsradio.org

WLLM (1370 AM) is a radio station broadcasting a Christian Radio format. Licensed to Lincoln, Illinois, United States, the station is owned by Great News Radio, through licensee Good News Radio, Inc. WLLM's format consists of Christian talk and teaching and Christian music.

== History ==
The station began broadcasting in April 1951, and it held the call sign WPRC. It ran 500 watts during daytime hours only, and was owned by Prairie Radio Corporation. In 1969, the station was sold to the Virginia Broadcasting Corporation for $255,000, and its power was increased to 1,000 watts. WPRC aired a full service-MOR format in the 1970s. By 1980, the station had adopted a country music format. In 1984, it was sold to Capital Broadcasting, along with WLRX, for $475,000. In 1990, it was sold to L&M Broadcasting, along with WESZ, for $390,000. In 1994, the station was sold to Central States Network, along with WESZ, for $700,000.

WPRC continued to air a country format into the 1990s. On February 1, 1995, the station's call sign was briefly changed to WNCY, but on March 20, 1995, it was changed back to WPRC. In 1996, the station's call sign was changed to WVAX, and it adopted a news-talk format, simulcasting AM 1240 WTAX during most hours, but airing a local show mornings. The station was sold to Saga Communications the following year.

In 1999, the station's call sign was changed to WLLM, and it adopted an adult standards format. In 2003, the station was purchased by Cornerstone Community Radio for $275,000, and it adopted a Christian format. In 2019, the station was sold to Good News Radio. The sale, which included six sister stations and seven translators, was consummated on February 12, 2020 at a price of $1.1 million.

== Translator ==
WLLM is also heard at 105.3 MHz, through a translator in Lincoln, Illinois.

Call sign	Frequency	City of license	FID	ERP (W)	HAAT	Class	FCC info
W287BP	105.3 FM	Lincoln, Illinois	138361	100	59.8 m (196 ft)	D	LMS
