= WLLM-FM =

Coordinates: 39°20′55″N 89°48′17″W

- Carlinville, Illinois; United States
- Broadcast area: Litchfield, Illinois
- Frequency: 90.1 MHz
- Branding: Great News Radio

Programming
- Format: Christian radio

Ownership
- Owner: Great News Radio; (Good News Radio, Inc.)
- Sister stations: WGNJ, WGNN, WJWR, WLLM, WLUJ

History
- First air date: August 11, 1997
- Former call signs: WTSG (1997–2016)

Technical information
- Licensing authority: FCC
- Facility ID: 28303
- Class: A
- ERP: 5,000 watts
- HAAT: 90 meters (300 ft)
- Translator: 105.3 W287CK (Springfield)

Links
- Public license information: Public file; LMS
- Webcast: Listen live
- Website: greatnewsradio.org

WLLM-FM (90.1 FM) is a radio station broadcasting a Christian radio format. Licensed to Carlinville, Illinois, United States, the station is owned by Great News Radio, through licensee Good News Radio, Inc. WLLM-FM's format consists of Christian talk and teaching and inspirational music.

== History ==
The station began broadcasting on August 11, 1997, and held the call sign WTSG. It aired a southern gospel format, and was owned by the Illinois Bible Institute. WTSG was branded "Today's Solid Gospel" and was an affiliate of Salem Radio Network's Solid Gospel southern gospel network. In 2012, Cornerstone Community Radio, Inc., owner of 1370 WLLM in Lincoln, Illinois, purchased the then-WTSG for $50,000, and began simulcasting the Christian programming of WLLM on the station. On July 18, 2016, the station's call sign was changed to WLLM-FM. In 2019, the station was sold to Good News Radio. The sale, which included six sister stations and seven translators, was consummated on February 12, 2020 at a price of $1.1 million.
