= List of mayors of Champaign, Illinois =

Mayor of Champaign
- Incumbent; Deborah Frank Feinen since 2015
- Term length: 4 years
- Formation: 1860
- First holder: E. T. McCann

The following is a list of mayors of the city of Champaign, Illinois, United States.

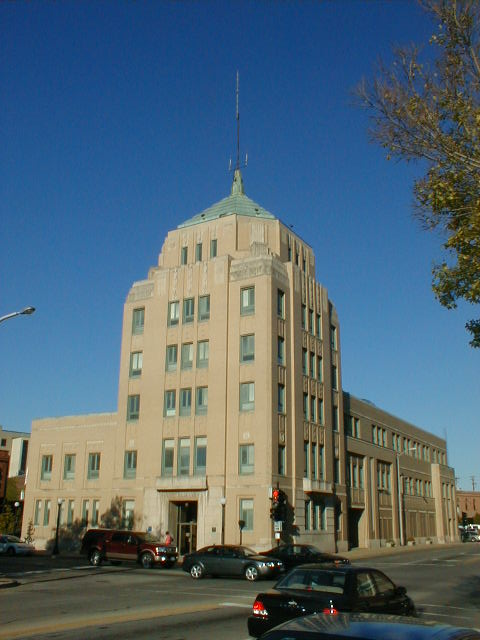
Municipal building in Champaign, Illinois (photo 2005)

- E. T. McCann, 1860
- D. Gardner, 1861
- J. S. Wright, 1862-1863
- E. L. Sweet, 1864-1865
- C. E. Larned, 1866-1868
- C. B. Smith, 1869-1870
- Levi Dodson, 1872
- J. Dickerson, 1873-1875, 1879
- Sandford Richards, 1874
- Henry Trevett, 1876-1879
- B. C. Beach, 1880, 1885-1886
- L. S. Wilcox, 1881-1882, 1887-1888
- J. B. McKinley, 1883
- W. A. Day, 1883-1884
- P. W. Woody, 1889-1890
- J. B. Harris, 1891-1894
- E. E. Chester, 1895-1896
- J. R. Scott, 1897-1898
- C. J. Sabin, 1899-1900
- Charles J. Mullikin, 1901-1902, c.1931-1936
- E. S. Swigart, 1903-1904, 1916-1917
- Shields A. Blain, 1905-1908
- S. C. Tucker, 1909, 1917-1922
- William Coughlin, 1911-1913
- O. B. Dobbins, 1914-1915
- George J. Babb, c.1923-1927, 1944-1951
- George B. Franks, c.1928-1930
- James D. Flynn, c.1935-1941
- M. Flynn, c.1942-1943
- Virgil F. Lafferty, c.1951-1958
- Emerson Dexter, c.1959-1966
- V. Wikoff, 1967-1975
- W. Bland, 1975-1979
- Joan Severns, 1979-1983
- Robert Dodd, 1983-1987
- Dannel McCollum, 1987-1999
- Gerald Schweighart, 1999-2011
- Don Gerard, 2011-2015
- Deborah Frank Feinen, 2015-present

== See also ==
- Champaign City Building
- Champaign history
