= Gerald Schweighart =

American politician (1938–2022)

Gerald J. "Jerry" Schweighart (May 4, 1938 – June 30, 2022), was a mayor of Champaign, Illinois, as well as the city's liquor commissioner. He held both positions starting in 1999. Schweighart served for six years on the Champaign City Council before becoming mayor.

Prior to his election to public office, Schweighart served as an officer with the Champaign Police Department. He joined the force in 1960, rising to the rank of detective. He also served as president of the Champaign Police Department Benevolent Association. In that capacity, he spearheaded efforts to raise funds to permit speed skater Bonnie Blair, a Champaign native, participate in the Winter Olympics between 1984 and 1994.

In 2010 at a Tea Party event, Schweighart expressed doubt that President Barack Obama was a U.S. citizen. Schweighart's statement led to a call for his resignation as mayor by Champaign County board member Al Kurtz. Schweighart was defeated in a re-election bid on April 5, 2011, by Don Gerard.

Schweighart died aged 84 on June 30, 2022.
