= Champaign, Illinois =

City in Illinois, United States

Champaign
- City
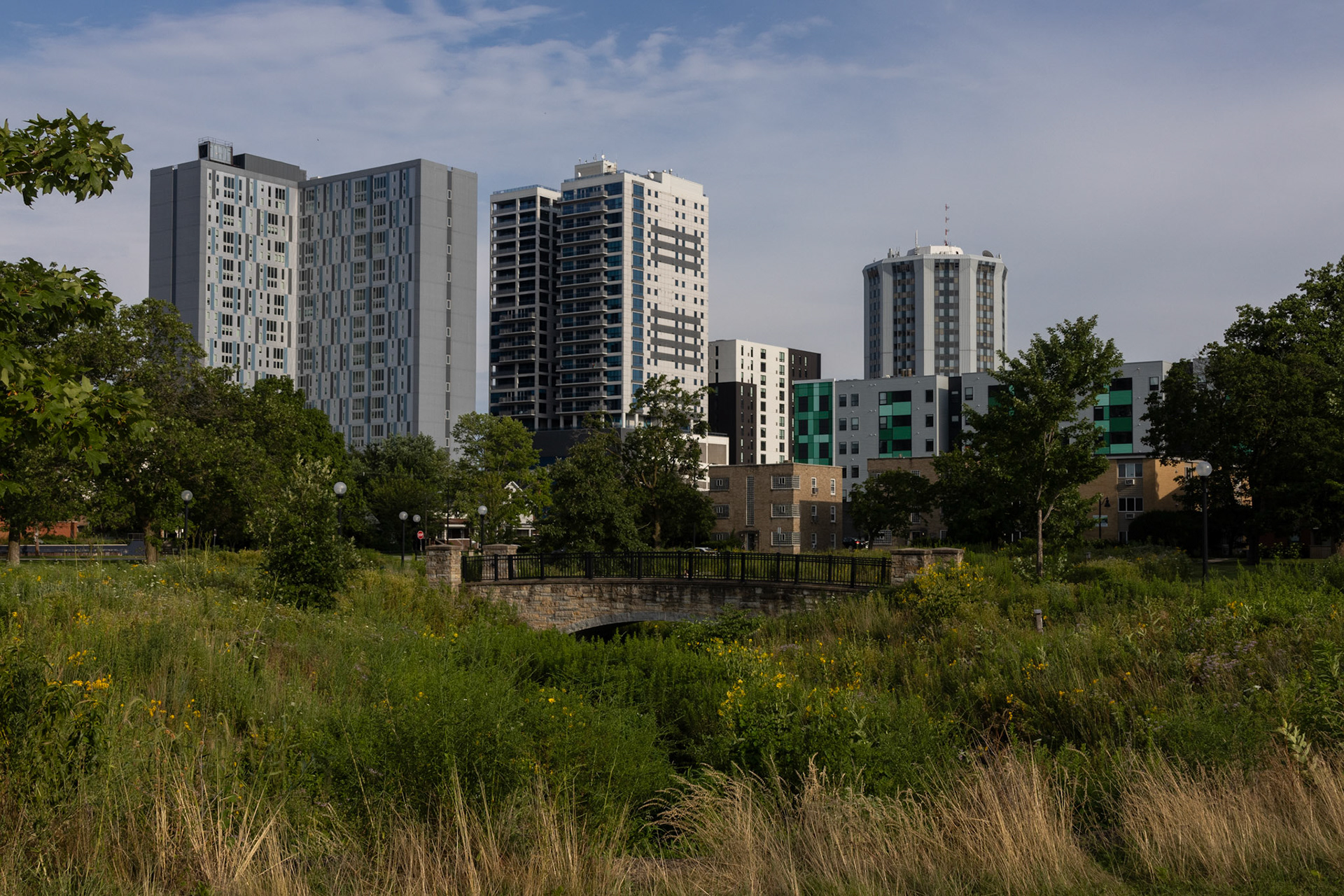
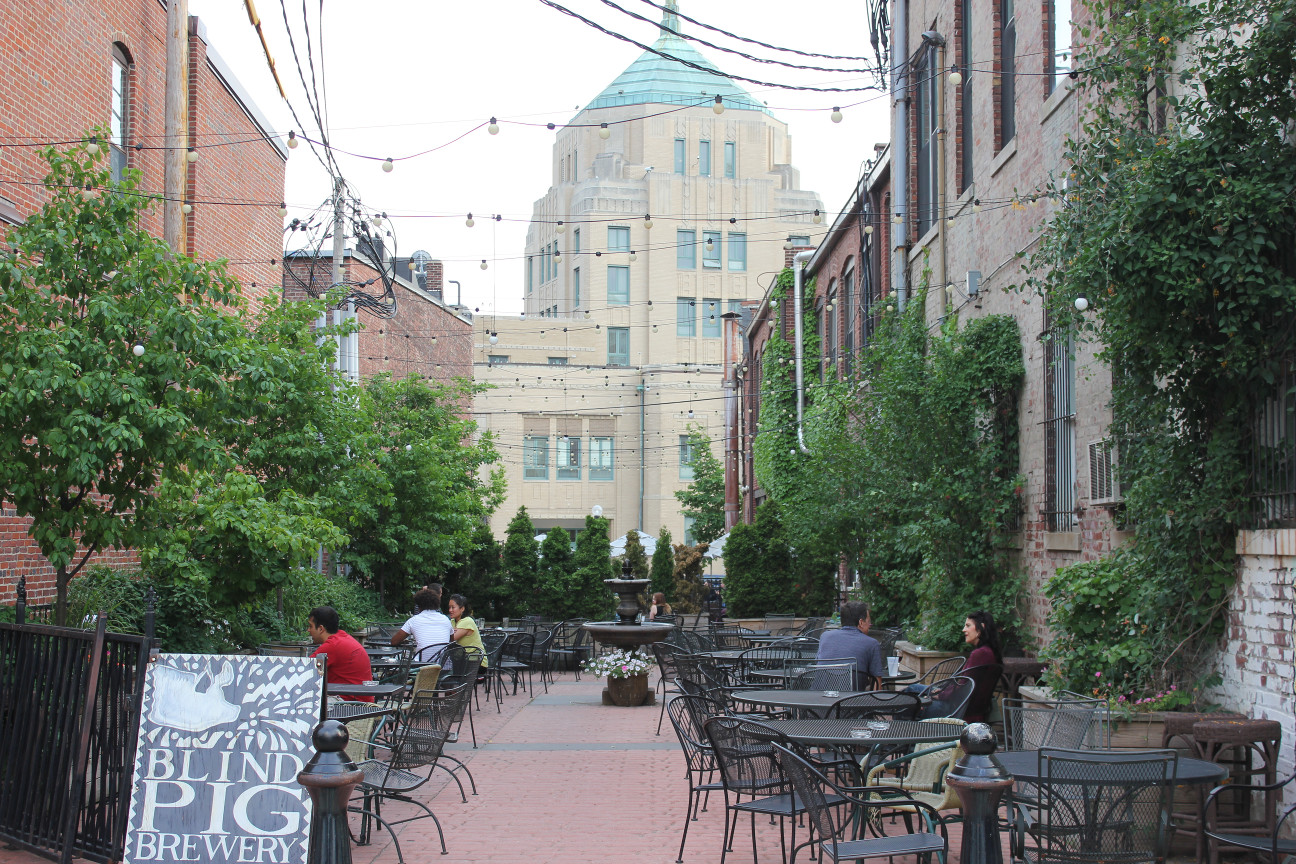
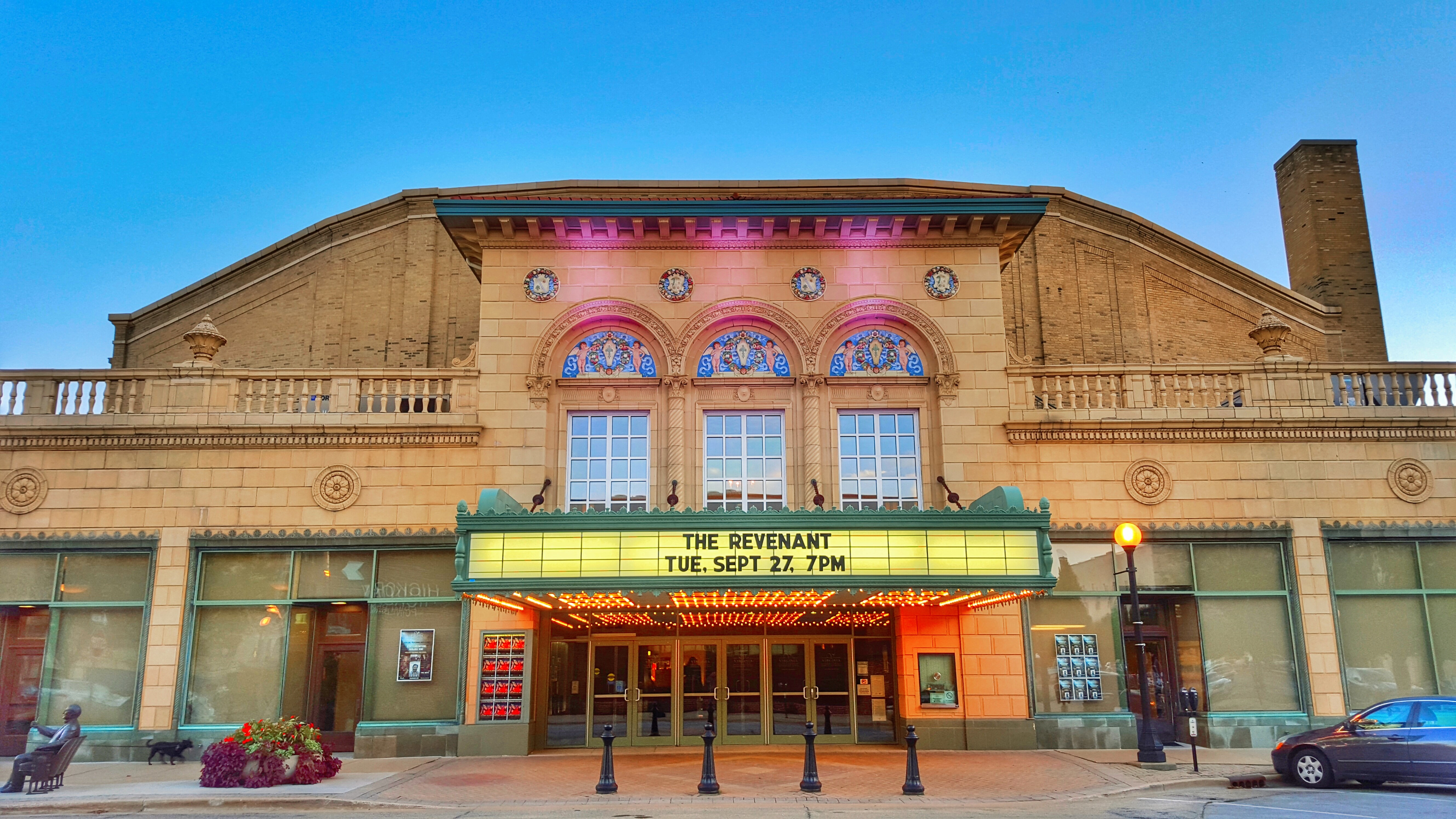
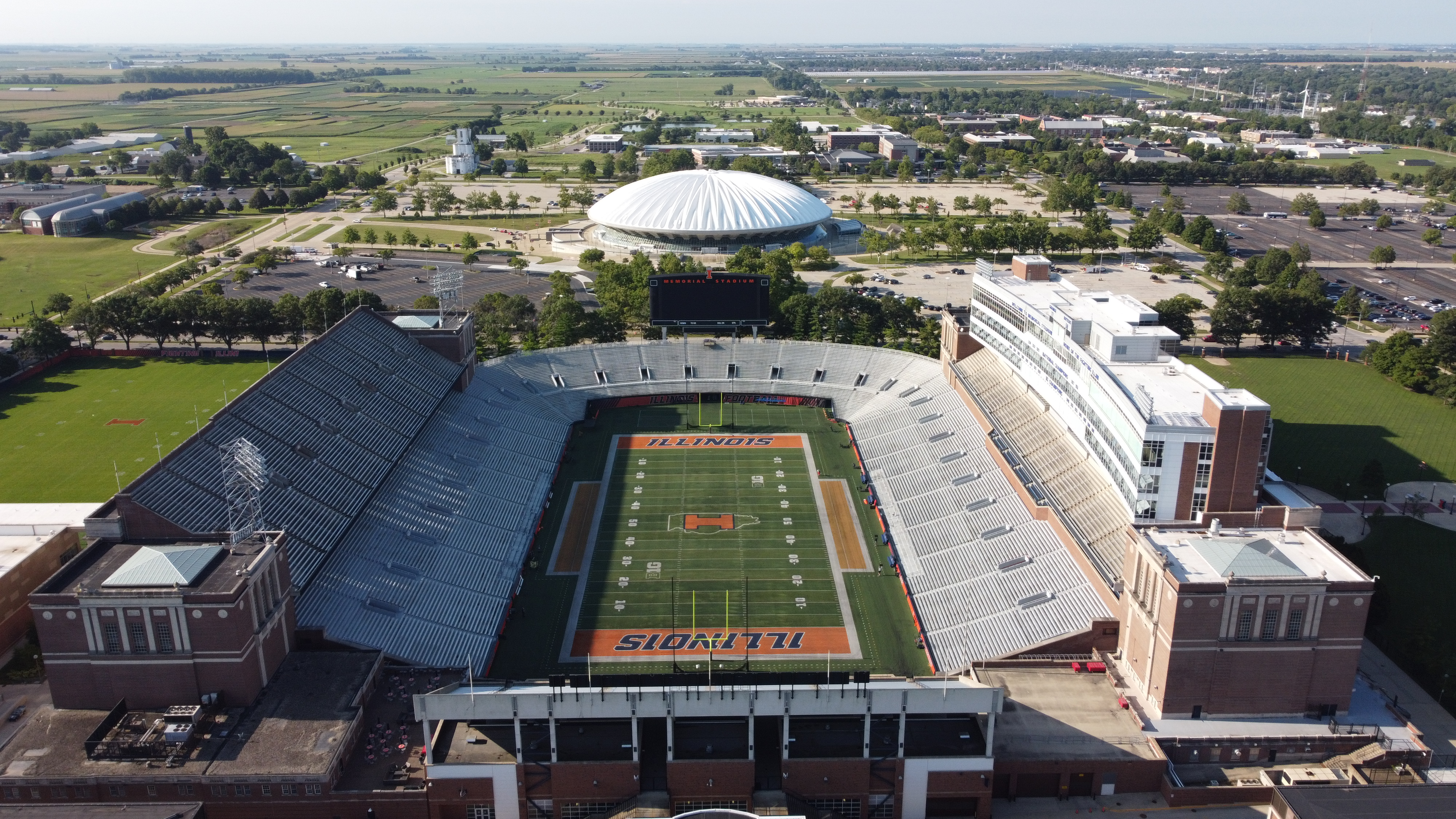
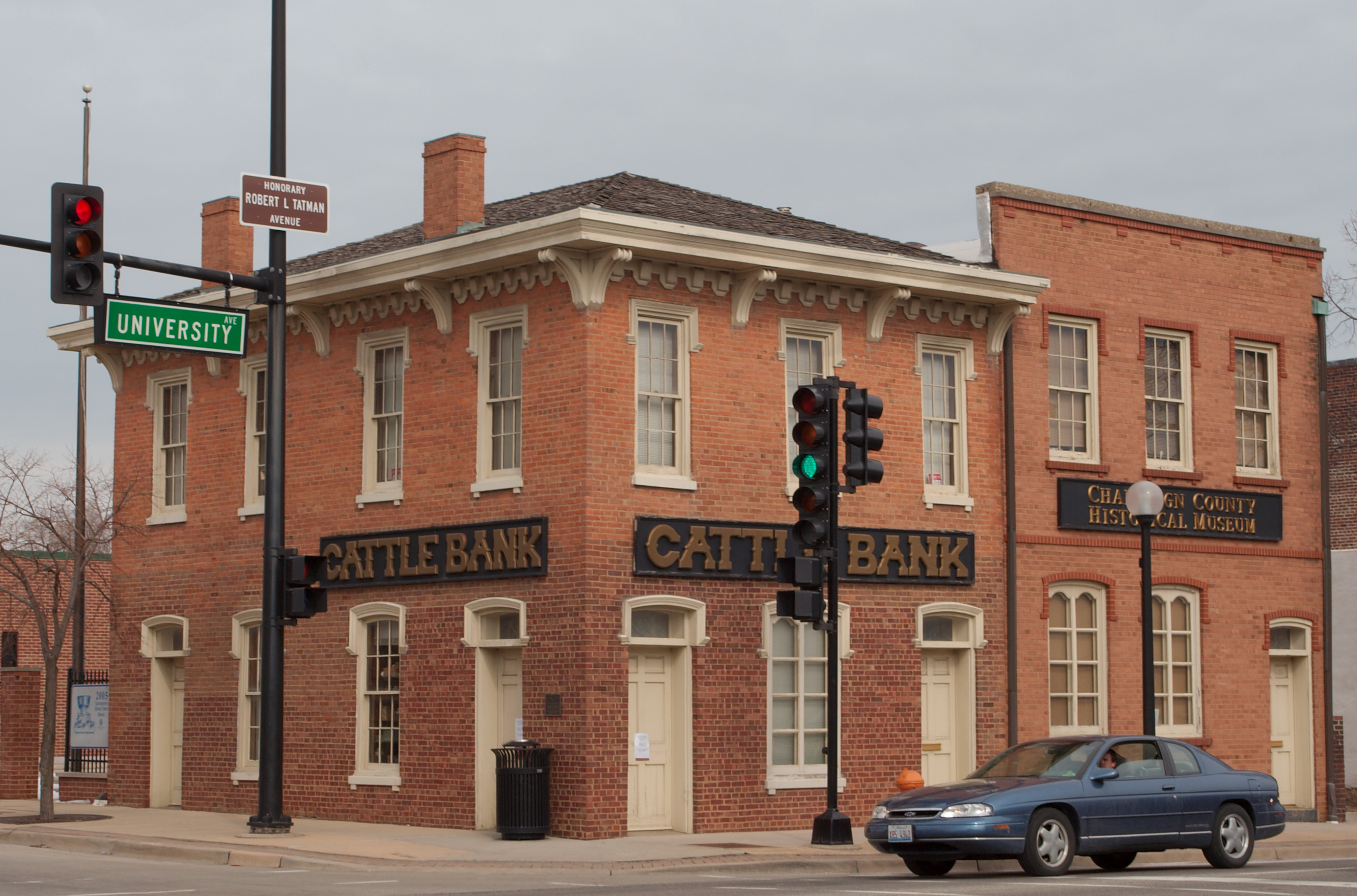
- Campustown Downtown Virginia Theatre Gies Memorial Stadium Cattle Bank

- Logo
- Interactive map of Champaign
- Location within Illinois Location within the United States
- Coordinates: 40°06′59″N 88°14′37″W
- Country: United States
- State: Illinois
- County: Champaign
- Township: Champaign City (coterminous)
- Founded: 1855 (West Urbana)
- Incorporated: 1860
- Chartered: 1866
- Named for: Champaign County, Ohio, U.S.

Government
  - Type: Council–manager
  - City manager: Joan Walls
  - Mayor: Deborah Frank Feinen

Area
  - City: 23.14 sq mi (59.9 km^{2})
  - Land: 22.99 sq mi (59.5 km^{2})
  - Water: 0.15 sq mi (0.39 km^{2})
- Elevation: 764 ft (233 m)

Population (2020)
  - City: 88,302
  - Estimate (2024): 91,961 ▲
  - Density: 4,032/sq mi (1,557/km^{2})
  - Urban: 145,361
  - Metro: 236,072
- Demonym: Champaignian
- Time zone: UTC−6 (CST)
  - Summer (DST): UTC−5 (CDT)
- ZIP Codes: 61820–61822, 61824–61826
- Area codes: 217, 447
- FIPS code: 17-12385
- GNIS feature ID: 2393796
- Website: champaignil.gov

Champaign (/ˌʃæmˈpeɪn/ sham-PAYN) is a city in Champaign County, Illinois, United States. The population was 88,302 at the 2020 census. It is the tenth-most populous municipality in Illinois and the fourth most populous city in the state outside the Chicago metropolitan area. It is a principal city of the Champaign–Urbana metropolitan area, which had 236,000 residents in 2020.

Champaign shares the main campus of the University of Illinois with its twin city of Urbana and is also home to Parkland College, which gives the city a large student population during the academic year. Due to the university and a number of technology startup companies, it is often referred to as a hub of the Illinois Silicon Prairie. Champaign houses offices for the Fortune 500 companies Abbott, Archer Daniels Midland (ADM), Caterpillar, John Deere, Dow Chemical Company, IBM, and State Farm. Champaign also serves as the headquarters for several companies, including Jimmy John's.

== History ==
=== 19th century ===
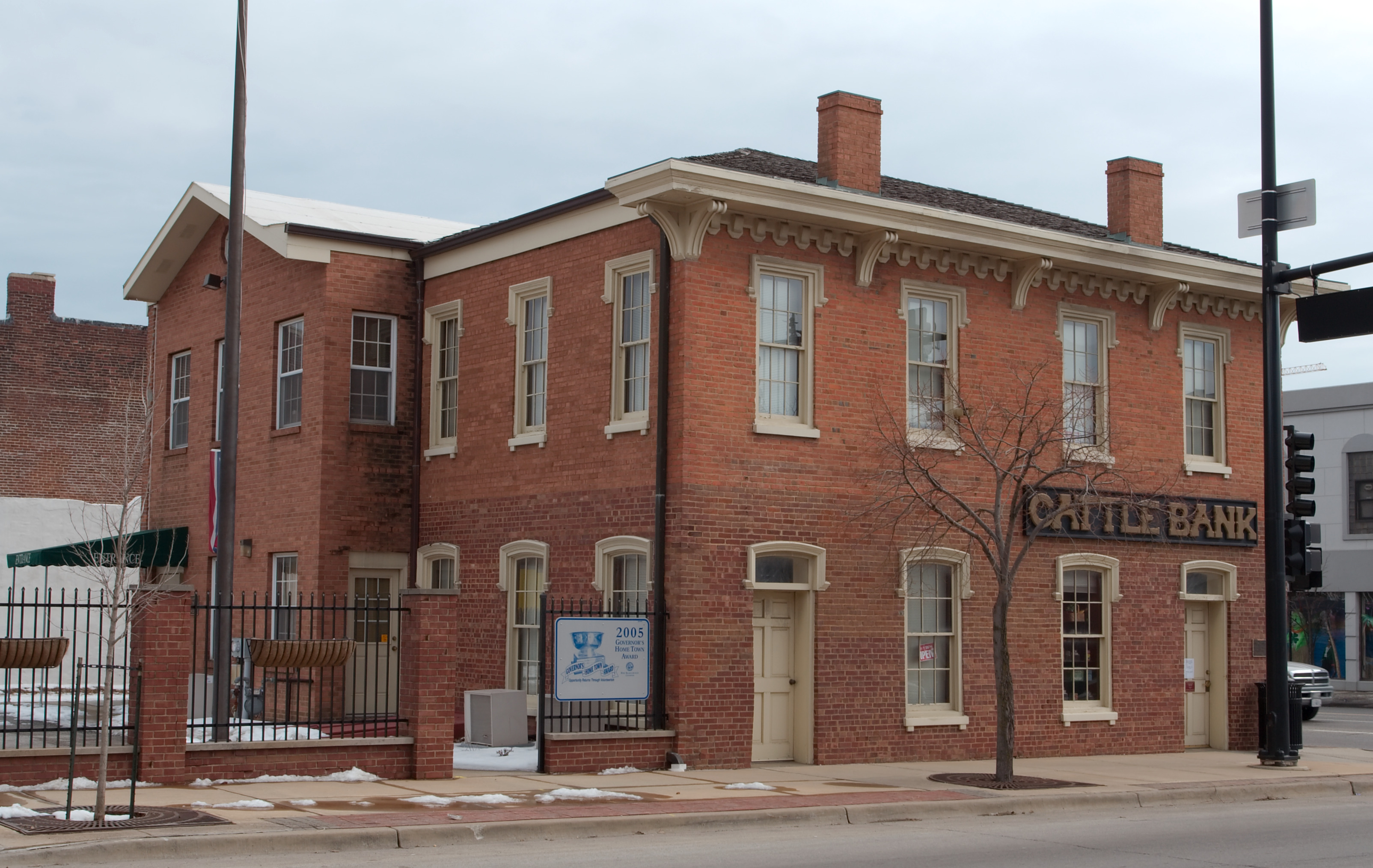
Cattle Bank building, constructed in 1858, is the oldest extant building in Champaign.

Champaign was founded in 1855, when the Illinois Central Railroad laid its rail track two miles (3 km) west of downtown Urbana. Originally called "West Urbana", it was renamed Champaign when it acquired a city charter in 1860. Both the city and county name were derived from Champaign County, Ohio, which took its name from the French word for "open, level country".

=== 20th century ===
In February 1969, Carl Perkins joined with Bob Dylan to write the song "Champaign, Illinois", which Perkins released on his album On Top. The band Old 97's took another Bob Dylan song, "Desolation Row", and combined its melody with new lyrics to make a new song "Champaign, Illinois", which they released with Dylan's blessing on their 2010 album The Grand Theatre Volume One. It achieved considerable popularity. The two "Champaign, Illinois" songs are not similar to each other, except that Bob Dylan was involved in both of them.

On September 22, 1985, Champaign hosted the first Farm Aid concert at the University of Illinois' Memorial Stadium. The concert drew a crowd of 80,000 people and raised over $7 million for American family farmers.

=== 21st century ===
In 2005, the University of Illinois in Champaign was the location of the National Science Olympiad Tournament, attracting young scientists from all 50 states. The city also hosts the state Science Olympiad competition every year. The University of Illinois Urbana-Champaign once again hosted the National competition on May 20–22, 2010.

Joan Severns was the city's first female mayor, serving between 1979 and 1983. Deborah Frank Feinen, who has served as mayor since 2015, is the city's second female mayor. In May 2017, the city's first female-majority city council was sworn in.

== Geography ==
=== Location ===
According to the 2021 census gazetteer files, Champaign has a total area of 23.14 square miles (59.93 km^{2}), of which 22.99 square miles (59.54 km^{2}) (or 99.37%) is land and 0.15 square miles (0.39 km^{2}) (or 0.63%) is water.

Champaign is a city in central Illinois and is located on relatively high ground, providing sources to the Kaskaskia River to the west, and the Embarras River to the south. Downtown Champaign drains into Boneyard Creek, which feeds the Saline Branch of the Salt Fork Vermilion River.

Champaign shares a border with the neighboring city of Urbana; together they are home to the University of Illinois. Champaign, Urbana, and the bordering village of Savoy form the Champaign–Urbana Metropolitan Area, also known as "Champaign–Urbana". It may also be colloquially known as the "Twin Cities", "Chambana" or "Shampoo–Banana".

=== Climate ===
The city has a humid continental climate, typical of the Midwestern United States, with hot summers and cold, moderately snowy winters. Temperatures exceed 90 °F (32.2 °C) on an average of 24 days per year, and typically fall below 0 °F (−17.8 °C) on six nights annually. The record high temperature in Champaign was 109 °F (42.8 °C) in 1954, and the record low was −25 °F (−31.7 °C), recorded on four separate occasions − in 1899, 1905, 1994 and 1999.

Climate data for Champaign 3S, Illinois (1991–2020 normals, extremes 1888–present)
Month	Jan	Feb	Mar	Apr	May	Jun	Jul	Aug	Sep	Oct	Nov	Dec	Year
Record high °F (°C)	70 (21)	75 (24)	88 (31)	95 (35)	97 (36)	103 (39)	109 (43)	102 (39)	102 (39)	93 (34)	80 (27)	71 (22)	109 (43)
Mean maximum °F (°C)	56.1 (13.4)	61.1 (16.2)	73.4 (23.0)	81.0 (27.2)	88.4 (31.3)	93.4 (34.1)	93.7 (34.3)	93.7 (34.3)	91.6 (33.1)	84.5 (29.2)	70.7 (21.5)	59.7 (15.4)	96.1 (35.6)
Mean daily maximum °F (°C)	33.5 (0.8)	38.4 (3.6)	50.4 (10.2)	63.1 (17.3)	73.8 (23.2)	82.7 (28.2)	85.2 (29.6)	84.0 (28.9)	78.8 (26.0)	65.8 (18.8)	50.7 (10.4)	38.5 (3.6)	62.1 (16.7)
Daily mean °F (°C)	25.7 (−3.5)	29.8 (−1.2)	40.8 (4.9)	52.4 (11.3)	63.2 (17.3)	72.4 (22.4)	75.2 (24.0)	73.8 (23.2)	67.2 (19.6)	54.8 (12.7)	41.4 (5.2)	31.1 (−0.5)	52.3 (11.3)
Mean daily minimum °F (°C)	17.9 (−7.8)	21.2 (−6.0)	31.2 (−0.4)	41.6 (5.3)	52.7 (11.5)	62.1 (16.7)	65.2 (18.4)	63.6 (17.6)	55.6 (13.1)	43.9 (6.6)	32.2 (0.1)	23.6 (−4.7)	42.6 (5.9)
Mean minimum °F (°C)	−5.1 (−20.6)	1.5 (−16.9)	12.6 (−10.8)	26.4 (−3.1)	38.2 (3.4)	49.5 (9.7)	55.5 (13.1)	53.9 (12.2)	41.8 (5.4)	28.6 (−1.9)	17.4 (−8.1)	3.9 (−15.6)	−8.6 (−22.6)
Record low °F (°C)	−25 (−32)	−25 (−32)	−9 (−23)	14 (−10)	26 (−3)	34 (1)	41 (5)	37 (3)	24 (−4)	12 (−11)	−5 (−21)	−20 (−29)	−25 (−32)
Average precipitation inches (mm)	2.31 (59)	2.18 (55)	2.77 (70)	3.94 (100)	4.78 (121)	4.58 (116)	4.49 (114)	3.54 (90)	3.37 (86)	3.35 (85)	3.21 (82)	2.40 (61)	40.92 (1,039)
Average snowfall inches (cm)	6.5 (17)	5.8 (15)	2.5 (6.4)	0.3 (0.76)	0.0 (0.0)	0.0 (0.0)	0.0 (0.0)	0.0 (0.0)	0.0 (0.0)	0.0 (0.0)	0.9 (2.3)	4.8 (12)	20.8 (53)
Average precipitation days (≥ 0.01 in)	9.9	9.2	10.8	11.9	13.4	11.2	10.3	9.1	7.9	9.8	9.8	9.9	123.2
Average snowy days (≥ 0.1 in)	5.4	4.4	2.1	0.3	0.0	0.0	0.0	0.0	0.0	0.0	1.1	4.1	17.4
Source: NOAA

== Demographics ==
Historical population
Census	Pop.	Note	%±
1860	1,727		—
1870	4,625		167.8%
1880	5,103		10.3%
1890	5,839		14.4%
1900	9,098		55.8%
1910	12,421		36.5%
1920	15,873		27.8%
1930	20,348		28.2%
1940	23,302		14.5%
1950	39,563		69.8%
1960	49,583		25.3%
1970	56,837		14.6%
1980	58,133		2.3%
1990	63,502		9.2%
2000	67,518		6.3%
2010	81,055		20.0%
2020	88,302		8.9%
2024 (est.)	91,961		4.1%
U.S. Census Bureau

=== Racial and ethnic composition ===
Champaign, Illinois – Racial and ethnic composition Note: the US Census treats Hispanic/Latino as an ethnic category. This table excludes Latinos from the racial categories and assigns them to a separate category. Hispanics/Latinos may be of any race.
Race / Ethnicity (NH = Non-Hispanic)	Pop 2000	Pop 2010	Pop 2020	% 2000	% 2010	% 2020
White alone (NH)	48,168	52,533	45,409	71.34%	64.81%	51.42%
Black or African American alone (NH)	10,471	12,474	15,625	15.51%	15.39%	17.96%
Native American or Alaska Native alone (NH)	132	143	99	0.20%	0.18%	0.11%
Asian alone (NH)	4,591	8,510	14,705	6.80%	10.50%	16.65%
Pacific Islander alone (NH)	20	56	27	0.03%	0.07%	0.03%
Other race alone (NH)	145	162	431	0.21%	0.20%	0.49%
Mixed race or Multiracial (NH)	1,267	2,066	4,289	1.88%	2.55%	4.86%
Hispanic or Latino (any race)	2,724	5,111	7,717	4.03%	6.31%	8.74%
Total	67,518	81,055	88,302	100.00%	100.00%	100.00%

=== 2020 census ===
As of the 2020 census, Champaign had a population of 88,302 and a population density of 3,816.81 inhabitants per square mile (1,473.68/km^{2}). The median age was 26.7 years. 16.8% of residents were under the age of 18 and 10.1% of residents were 65 years of age or older. For every 100 females there were 100.5 males, and for every 100 females age 18 and over there were 99.6 males age 18 and over.

There were 36,545 households and 15,624 families in Champaign; 21.4% had children under the age of 18 living in them, 29.4% were married-couple households, 29.6% were households with a male householder and no spouse or partner present, and 34.2% were households with a female householder and no spouse or partner present. About 39.0% of all households were made up of individuals and 7.9% had someone living alone who was 65 years of age or older.

There were 40,314 housing units at an average density of 1,742.55 per square mile (672.80/km^{2}), of which 9.3% were vacant. The homeowner vacancy rate was 2.1% and the rental vacancy rate was 9.4%.

100.0% of residents lived in urban areas, while 0.0% lived in rural areas.

Racial composition as of the 2020 census
Race	Number	Percent
White	47,201	53.5%
Black or African American	15,866	18.0%
American Indian and Alaska Native	326	0.4%
Asian	14,737	16.7%
Native Hawaiian and Other Pacific Islander	40	0.0%
Some other race	3,494	4.0%
Two or more races	6,638	7.5%

=== American Community Survey estimates ===
In the 2018–2022 American Community Survey, 16.69% of residents were Asian, including 6.34% Chinese, 3.92% Indian, 1.83% Korean, 1.05% Filipino, 0.86% Vietnamese, 0.46% Thai, and 0.27% Pakistani.

=== Income ===
The median income for a household in the city was $49,467, and the median income for a family was $78,118. Males had a median income of $36,680 versus $27,805 for females. The per capita income for the city was $30,245. About 10.3% of families and 23.9% of the population were below the poverty line, including 17.3% of those under age 18 and 9.4% of those age 65 or over.

== Economy ==
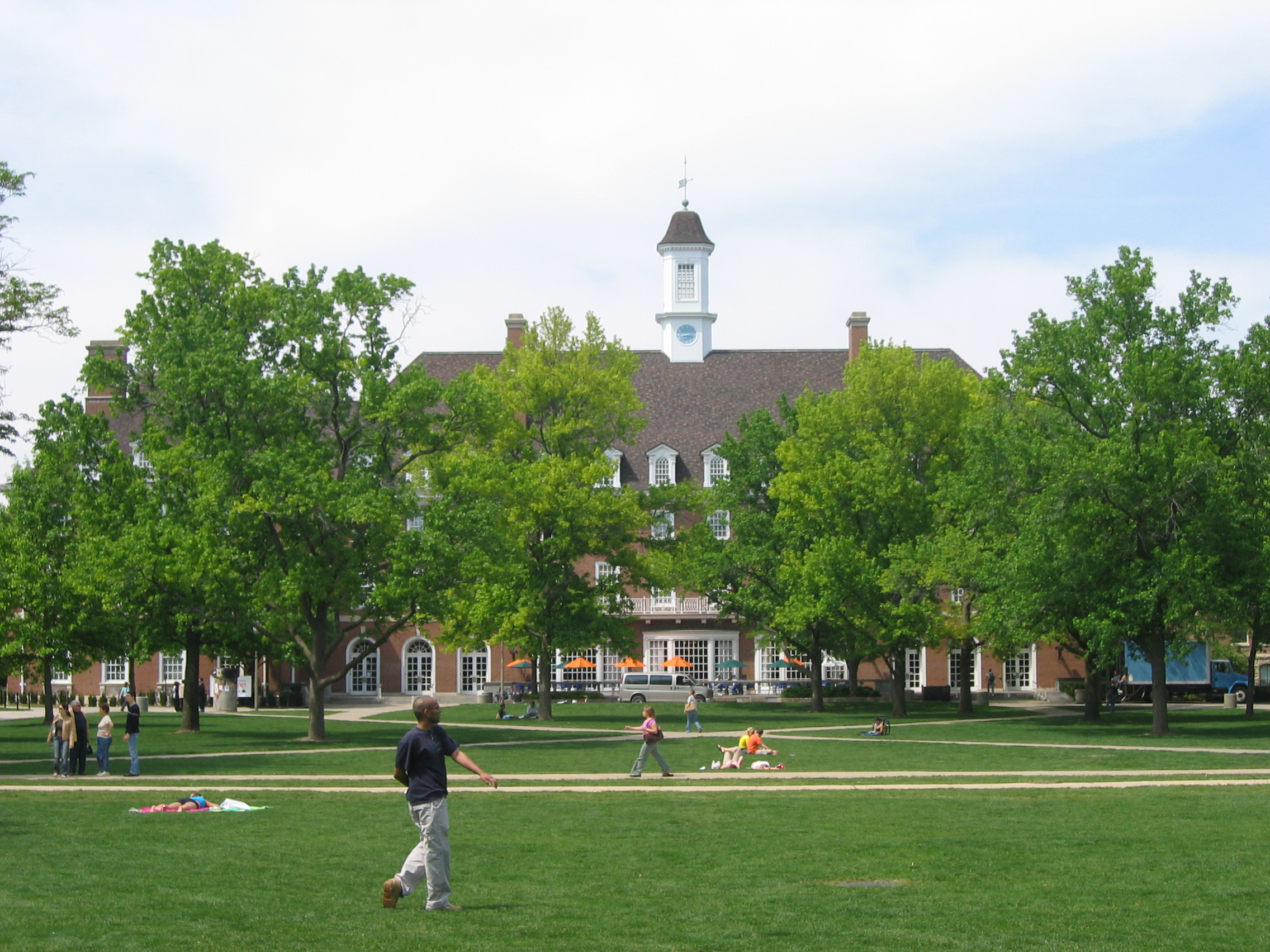
The Illini Union at the University of Illinois Urbana-Champaign. The university is the city's top employer.

In addition to the University of Illinois, Champaign is also home to Parkland College. Herff Jones, formerly Collegiate Cap and Gown, and Kraft also form part of the city's industrial base. Kraft's plant is one of the largest pasta factories in North America. The Champaign-Urbana community is a well-known hub for startups, including a top ranking from Silicon Prairie News in 2019.

Champaign is home to nationally recognized record labels, artist management companies, booking agencies, and recording studios. Polyvinyl Records, Undertow Music, Parasol Records, Great Western Record Recorders, Pogo Studios, and Nicodemus Booking Agency are all based in Champaign.

In April 2011, The Christian Science Monitor named Champaign-Urbana one of the five cities leading the economic turnaround based on jobs; the information sector added over 300 jobs within a year and unemployment dropped 2.1%.

=== Research Park ===
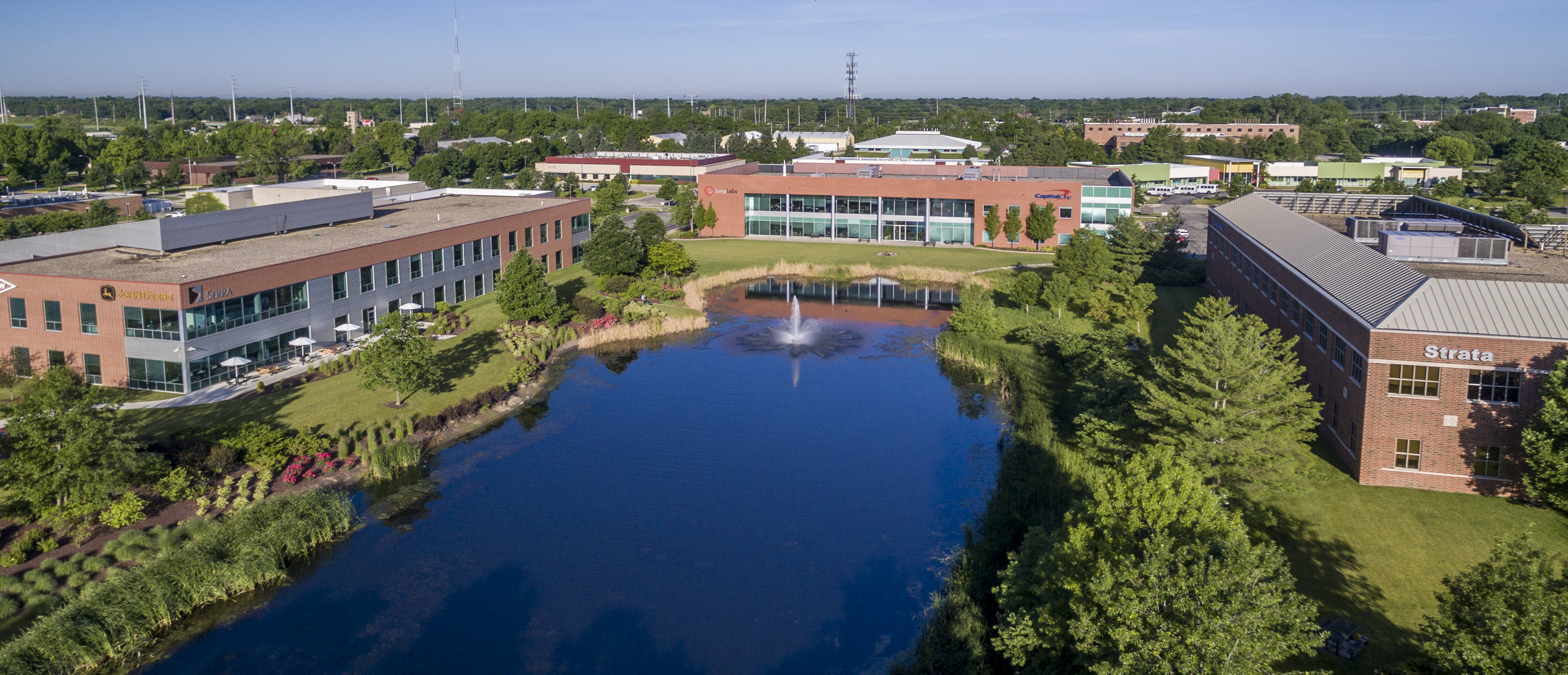
Research Park at the University of Illinois Urbana-Champaign

Champaign features a large technology and software industry mostly focusing on research and development of new technologies. The Research Park, located on campus land just south of the State Farm Center and run by the University of Illinois, is home to many companies, including Caterpillar, ADM, John Deere, AbbVie, Motorola Solutions, Brunswick, Capital One, Cargill, NVIDIA, Riverbed Technology, Abbott Laboratories, Yahoo! and the State Farm Research and Development Center.

Research Park is also home to a technology incubator, EnterpriseWorks, that has launched over 350 startups since its opening in 2014. Famous graduates of EnterpriseWorks include Agrible, which was sold to Nutrien in 2018 for $63 million, and Starfire, which later moved to its own 190,000 sq ft building in the northwest side of Champaign.

=== Top employers ===
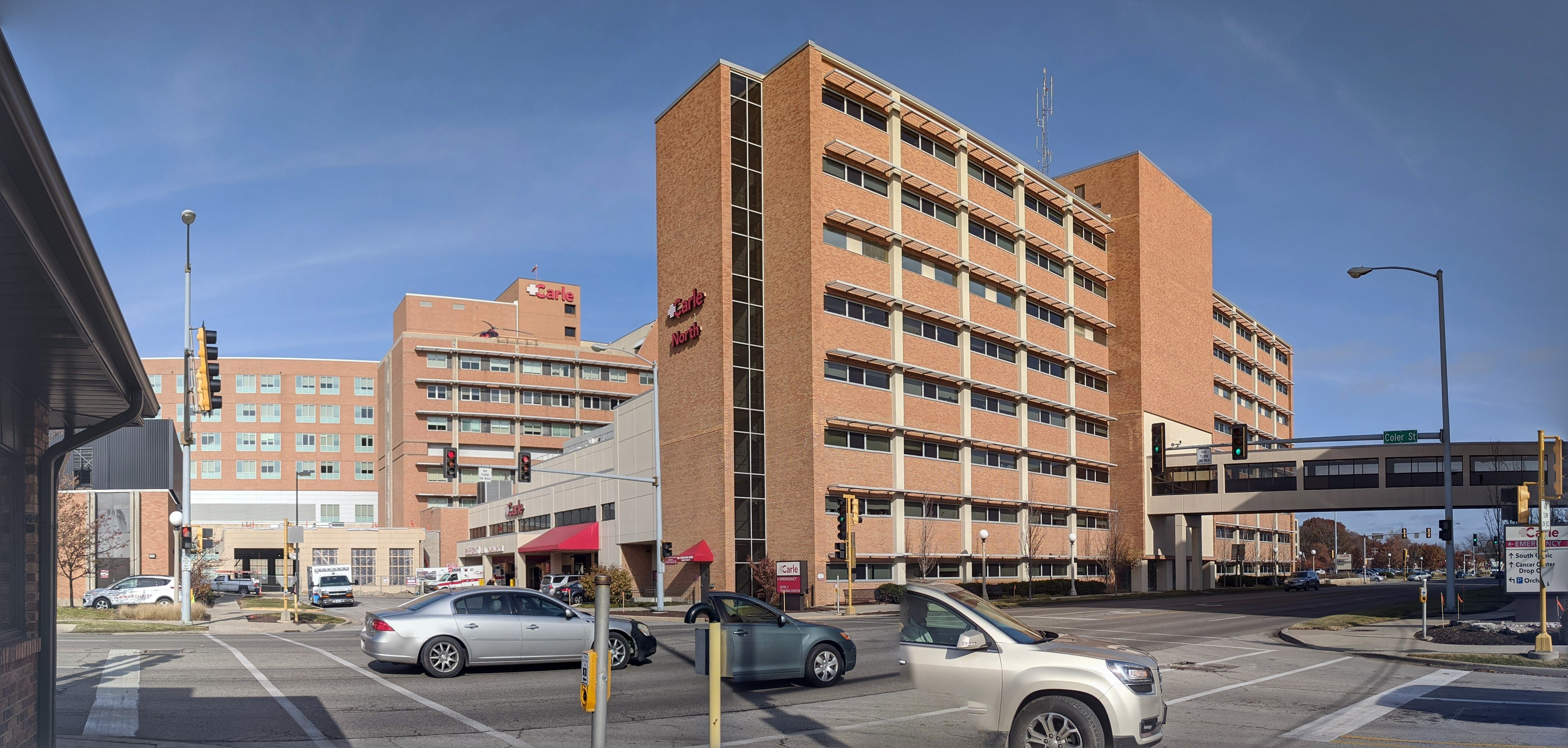
Carle Foundation Hospital

According to the Champaign County Economic Development Corporation, the top ten employers in the city are:

#	Employer	# of Employees
1	University of Illinois Urbana-Champaign	13,934
2	Carle Foundation Hospital	6,921
3	Champaign Unit 4 School District	1,664
4	Kraft Heinz	925
5	Christie Clinic	916
6	Champaign County	893
7	Urbana School District#116	828
8	FedEx	815
9	OSF HealthCare	774
10	Parkland College	741

Other major employers include Horizon Hobby, Jimmy John's, Plastipak, SuperValu, and Wolfram Research. Numerous other software and technology companies also have offices in Champaign including Ansys, Amdocs, Cloudflare, Instarecon, Phonak, Power World, and Caterpillar Simulation Center. The largest high technology employer is Wolfram Research, with more than 400 employees in Champaign. The United States Army Corps of Engineers maintains the Construction Engineering Research Laboratory (CERL) in Champaign.

== Arts and culture ==
=== Landmarks and districts ===
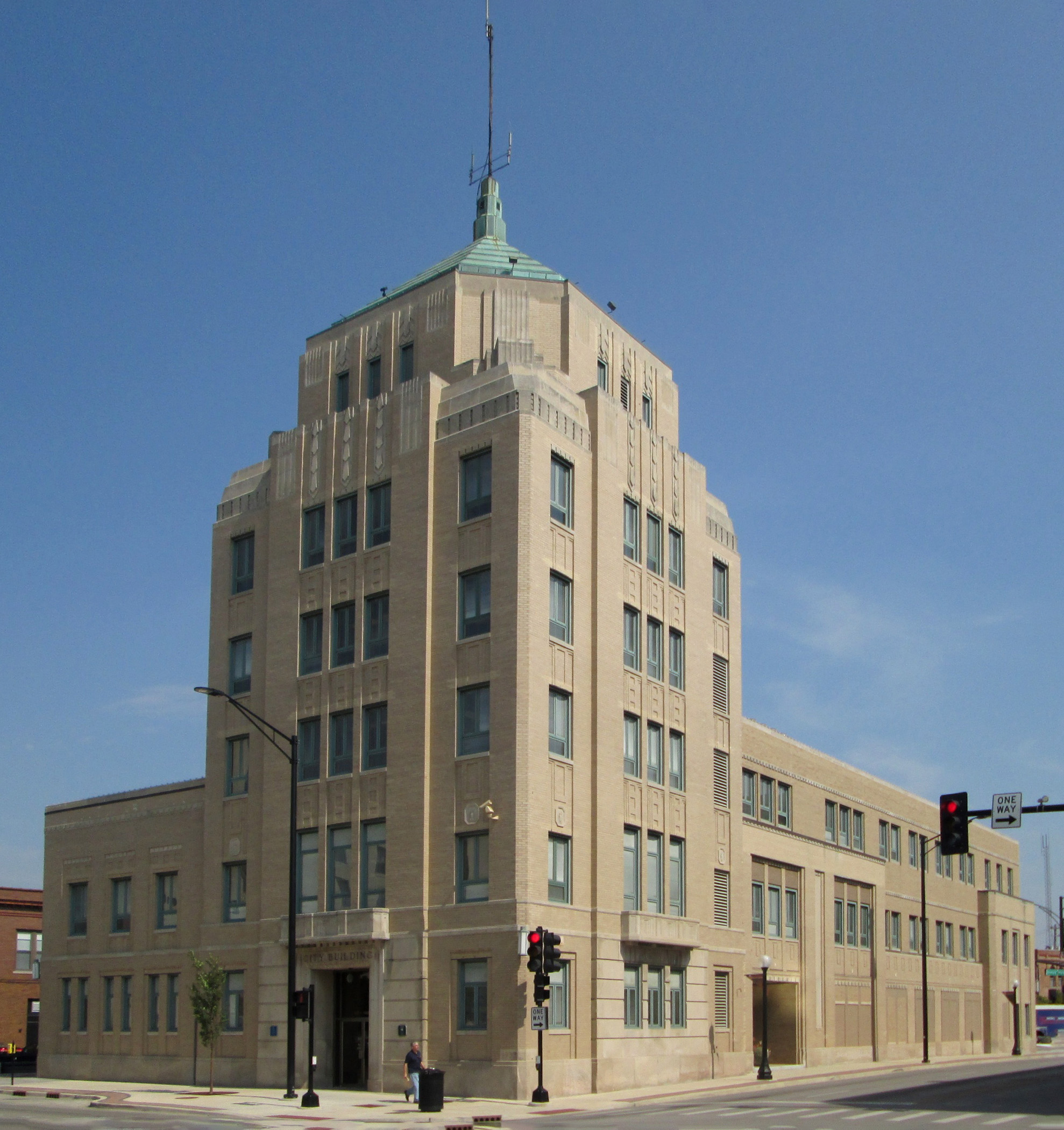
City Building in downtown Champaign

==== Downtown ====
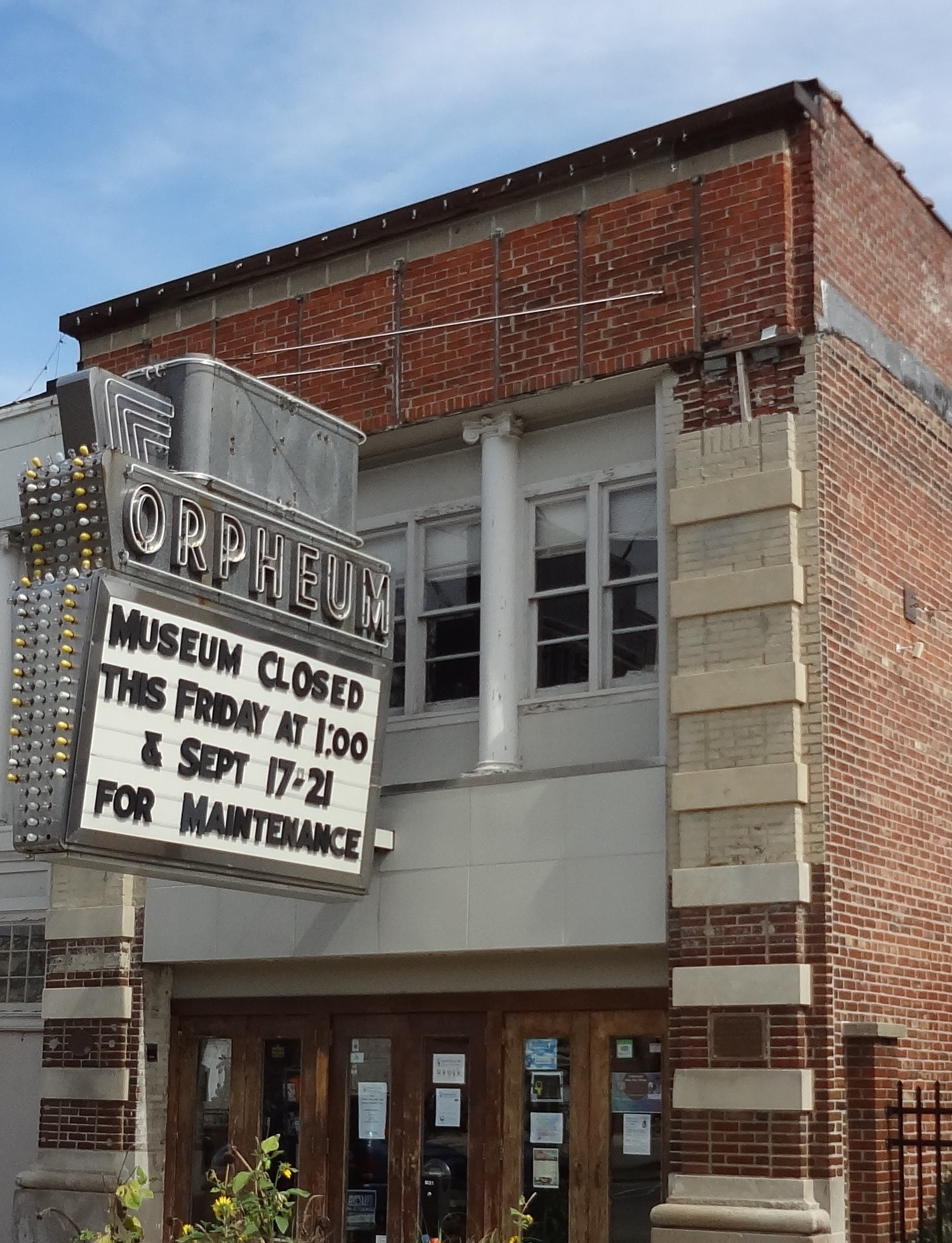
Orpheum Theatre

In the 1980s, part of the downtown Champaign area (Neil St.) was closed to vehicular traffic to create a pedestrian mall, but this short-lived experiment was scrapped when business declined. As part of a revitalization effort, One Main Development constructed two new mixed-use buildings: One Main and M2 on Neil. The City of Champaign gave $3.7 million in tax incentives for the building of M2 and agreed to pay nearly $11 million for a new parking deck.

This growth in downtown Champaign coincided with the larger growth of the "north Prospect" shopping district on the city's northern boundary. The growth in the north Prospect area relied, in part, on leapfrogging, moving out to the countryside and developing more remote farmland that eventually connects to the main development. Given the overwhelming success of such suburban shopping areas nationally, new development within any city center represented an alternative to the dominant movement out and away from the cities.

The Champaign City Building serves as the City Hall and is a recognizable landmark. The building replaces the original city building, which sat on the same site until 1937.

The historic Virginia Theatre is a restored 1463-seat movie theater which opened on December 28, 1921. It has an ornate, Spanish Renaissance-influenced interior, full stage and dressing rooms, and its original Wurlitzer pipe organ. It hosts Ebertfest and has a single 56' x 23' screen. The theater does not have a daily show schedule, but schedules special screenings and live performances several times each month.

The Art Theater Co-op, which showed independent and foreign films, was built in 1913 as the Park Theatre. From 1969 to 1986, it showed adult films. Until its closing in October 2019, it was the only single-screen movie theater operating daily in Champaign-Urbana, and was the United States' first co-operatively owned art movie theater. The Champaign County Welcome Center is located at 17 East Taylor Street in downtown Champaign and provides visitors with information about local attractions and events.

==== Campustown ====
Located along Green Street, this commercial district serves as the entertainment and retail center for students at the University of Illinois and citizens of the Champaign–Urbana metropolitan area. This area has been undergoing change since 2002 with the completion of a new $7 million streetscape project. Campustown is now attracting new retail and entertainment stores as well as serving as the center for new construction projects. Several new projects opened in 2008 including the 18-story Burnham 310 high-rise and grocery store at 4th and Springfield, and a new 24-story apartment building called 309 Green.

The newly renamed Tower at 3rd (formerly Champaign Hilton, Century 21, Quality Inn, University Inn, Presidential Tower) is located in the University District and is over twenty stories high. A hotel until 2001, it currently houses student apartments.

A new 14-story apartment complex was completed in 2014 at the intersection of 6th and Green streets (site of the former Gameday Spirit). A 12-story, mixed-use complex consisting of a hotel, apartments and parking was scheduled to be completed by August 2015. The mixed-use complex is reported to consist of two towers which will be connected by a skywalk. A 27-story apartment building is planned at 308 East Green Street. This high-rise is reported to have an automated parking vault which will be operated by an elevator.

=== Museums and libraries ===
- Orpheum Children's Science Museum. A hands on science museum for children. It closed in 2020.
- Krannert Art Museum. An Art Museum featuring both modern and classical art owned by the University of Illinois Urbana-Champaign. It has 48,000 square feet (4,500 m^{2}) of space devoted to all periods of art, from ancient Egyptian to contemporary photography.
- Champaign County Historical Museum. Located in the historic Cattle Bank built in 1858. Features exhibits on the history of the area and the Midwest as a whole.
- Champaign Public Library
- Urbana Free Library

== Sports ==
=== Illinois Fighting Illini ===
The University of Illinois Urbana-Champaign fields ten men and eleven women varsity sports.

Illinois Fighting Illini
Team	Established	Big Ten Conference Titles	NCAA Postseason Appearances	National Titles	Venue	Opened	Capacity
Football	1890	15	17	5	Memorial Stadium	1923	60,670
Men's basketball	1905	17	30	1	State Farm Center	1963	15,500
Women's basketball	1974	1	8	0	State Farm Center	1963	15,500
Baseball	1879	29	10	0	Illinois Field	1988	3,000
Women's volleyball	1974	4	22	0	Huff Hall	1925	4,050
Men's gymnastics	1898	24	44	10	Huff Hall	1925	4,050

=== Stadiums ===
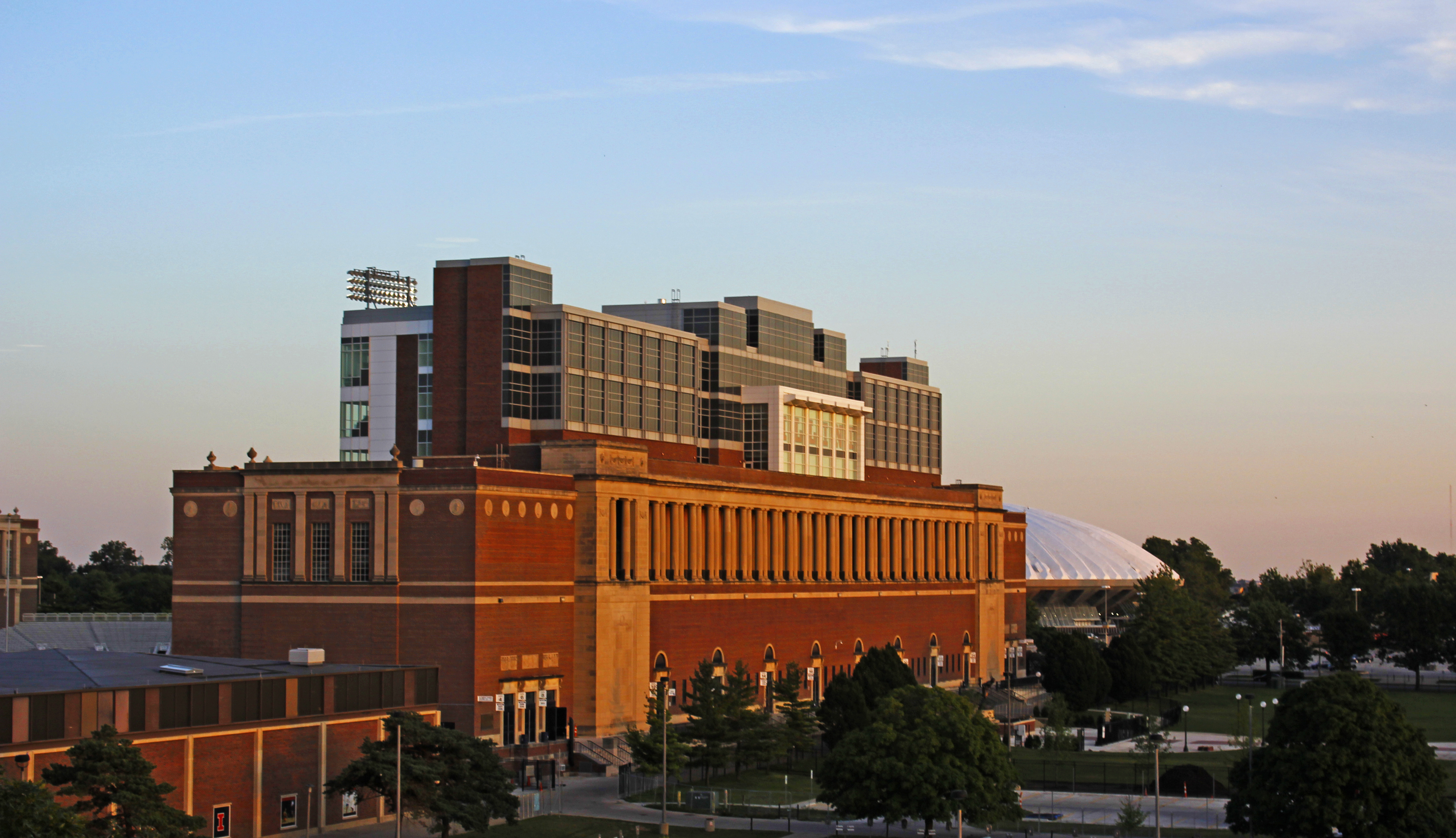
Facade of Memorial Stadium

Built from 1922 to 1923, Memorial Stadium was named in honor of the students and faculty members who died overseas during World War I. Since opening in 1923, Memorial Stadium has been home to Illinois Fighting Illini football. The stadium also was the temporary home of the NFL's Chicago Bears for the 2002 season while its regular venue Soldier Field was being renovated.

Originally known as the Assembly Hall, the State Farm Center is home to the Illinois Fighting Illini men's basketball and Illinois Fighting Illini women's basketball teams. It holds the annual Broadway Series, which features popular musicals.

=== Minor league ===
During its history, the city has been home to several separate minor league baseball clubs. The first in 1889 was a shared club between Champaign and Logansport, Indiana, called the Logansport/Champaign-Urbana Clippers. The Clippers played for one season in the Illinois–Indiana League before folding. The city hosted its second team, the Champaign-Urbana Velvets from 1911 to 1914 who played in the Illinois–Missouri League until the league disbanded after 1914. The city's most recent minor league team was the Champaign-Urbana Bandits who played during the single 1994 season of the Great Central League. The Bandits played at Illinois Field. Prior to holding postseason play, the league folded.

Twice Champaign was also home to a Collegiate Summer Baseball League team. The city's Champaign County Colts were a founding member of the Central Illinois Collegiate League from 1963 to 1964. In 1990, the Colts were revived as the Champaign-Urbana Colts until the team folded in 1996. The more recent club played its home games at Illinois Field.

In October 2014, the Midwest Professional Basketball Association announced the creation of the Champaign Swarm as one of its founding members, that began play at the Dodds Athletic Center in January 2015.

== Parks and recreation ==
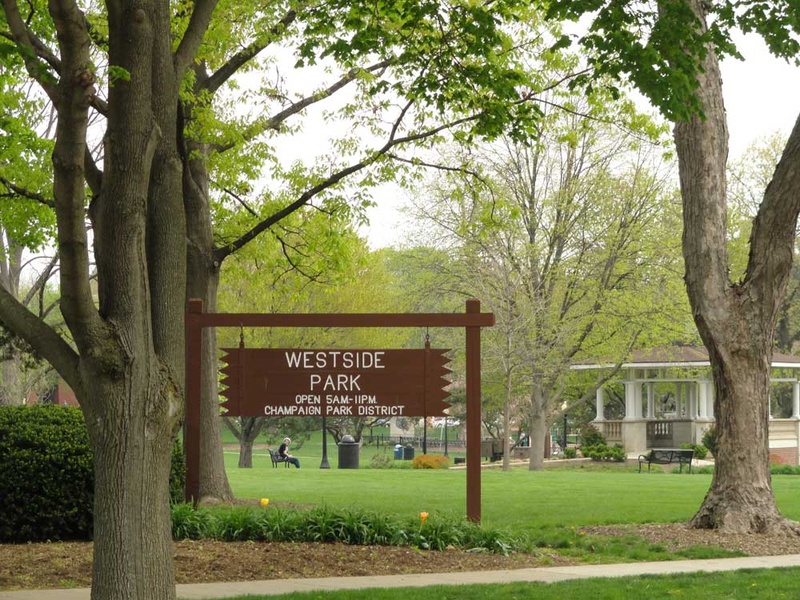
West Side Park

There are 60 parks, 11 trails, and 14 facilities within the city of Champaign, totaling over 654 acres (2.65 km^{2}).

== Education ==
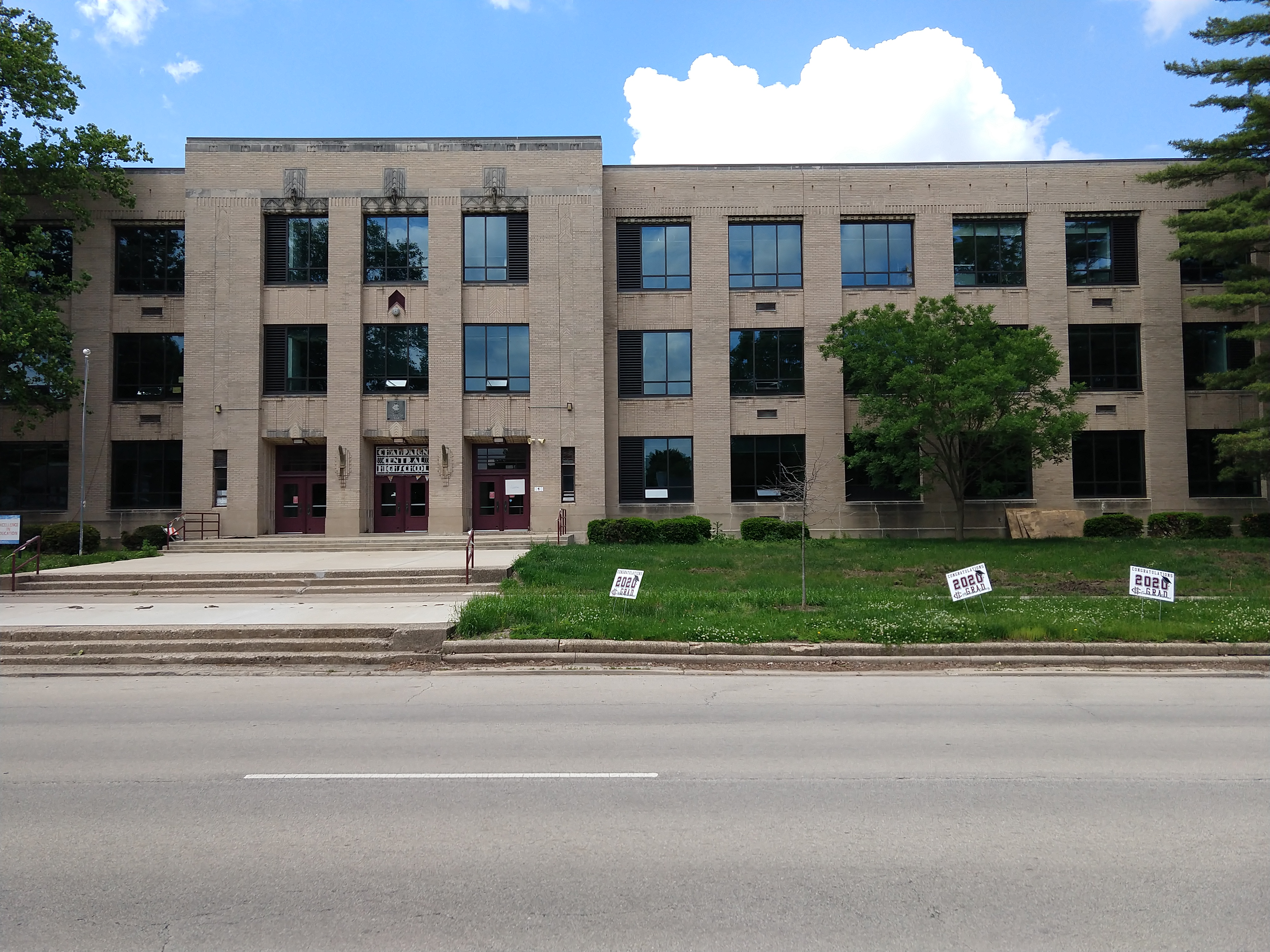
Champaign Central High School

=== Primary and secondary ===
The city of Champaign is served by Champaign Unit 4 School District. Unit 4 administers both Champaign Central High School and Champaign Centennial High School.

Champaign is also served by three private high schools. The largest of the three is St. Thomas More High School which is located on the city's far northwest side. The school opened in 2000 and is the newest charter of the Roman Catholic Diocese of Peoria. Judah Christian School, which is located just south of I-74 on Prospect Avenue, opened in 1983 and serves grades pre-kindergarten through 12. Academy High is a private, independent high school located in South Champaign which opened in 2017. The school is designed to be student-centered, highly collaborative, and project-based.

=== Higher education ===
Located within Champaign are two institutions of higher education, the University of Illinois Urbana-Champaign and Parkland College. The University of Illinois Urbana-Champaign, located in the city's eastern side, is a public land-grant research university and the flagship institution of the University of Illinois system. It is one of the largest public universities by enrollment in the United States with over 50,000 students enrolled annually. Parkland College, located in northwestern Champaign, is part of the Illinois Community College System and enrolls approximately 9,000 students annually.

== Media ==
=== Radio ===
- 88.3 W201CK (Translates 90.7 KHRI) "Air 1", Christian CHR
- 88.7 WPCD, Parkland College College radio
- 89.3 WGNJ, Religious
- 90.1 WEFT, Community radio
- 90.9 WILL-FM, Classical music (RDS)
- 91.7 WBGL, Christian AC (RDS)
- 92.1 W221CK "Extra 92.1" Rock (RDS – Artist/Title)
- 92.5 WREE "Rewind 92.5", Classic hits (RDS – Artist/Title)
- 93.5 WSJK, Talk/sports
- 94.5 WLRW "Mix 94.5" Hot AC (RDS – Artist/Title) (HD Radio)
- 95.3 WJEK, Adult contemporary
- 95.7 WLHF, Catholic radio, Religious, Christian
- 96.1 WQQB "Q 96", CHR/Pop (RDS)
- 97.5 WHMS-FM "Lite Rock 97.5" Adult contemporary
- 98.3 WPEO-FM, Christian
- 99.1 WYXY "WYXY Classic" Country (RDS – Artist/Title)
- 99.7 W259BG "HITS 99.7" Top 40
- 100.3 WIXY "WIXY 100.3" Country (RDS – Artist/Title)
- 101.1 W266AF (Translates 90.9 WILL-FM HD2), Classical music
- 102.5 WGNN, Religious
- 103.9 W280DE (Translates 102.5 WGNN), Religious
- 104.5 WRFU-LP "Radio Free Urbana", Variety
- 105.5 WKIO "105.5 WKIO" Classic rock
- 105.9 WGKC, Country (RDS)
- 106.5 simulcast of 1460 AM WKJR, Spanish Music
- 107.1 WPGU, "Champaign's Alternative", Alternative rock
- 107.9 WDWS-FM "107.9 The Rooster" Country
- 580 WILL, Public Radio
- 1400 WDWS, News/Talk (AM Stereo)
- 1460 WKJR, Spanish Music

NOAA Weather Radio station WXJ76 transmits from Champaign and is licensed to NOAA's National Weather Service Central Illinois Weather Forecast Office at Lincoln, broadcasting on a frequency of 162.550 MHz (channel 7 on most newer weather radios, and most SAME weather radios). The station activates the SAME tone alarm feature and a 1050 Hz tone activating older radios (except for AMBER Alerts, using the SAME feature only) for hazardous weather and non-weather warnings and emergencies, along with selected weather watches, for the Illinois counties of Champaign, Coles, DeWitt, Douglas, Edgar, Ford, Moultrie, Piatt, and Vermillion. Weather permitting, a tone alarm test of both the SAME and 1050 Hz tone features are conducted every Wednesday between 11 am and Noon.

=== Television ===
- 3 WCIA, CBS
- 7 W07DD-D, Three Angels Broadcasting Network
- 12 WILL-TV, PBS
- 15 WICD "NewsChannel 15", ABC
- 17 WAND, NBC
- 23 WBUI, CW
- 27 WCCU "Fox 55/27"
- 33 W31EH-D, Trinity Broadcasting Network
- 44 WBXC-CA, MTV 2
- 49 WCIX "My WCFN TV" MyNetworkTV
- 51 WEIU, PBS

=== Newspapers ===
- The News-Gazette, daily local newspaper
- Daily Illini, campus newspaper
- The Booze News, former satirical campus newspaper, now called The Black Sheep
- Buzz Weekly, weekly entertainment magazine
- Prospectus News, Parkland College's independent student newspaper

== Transportation ==
=== Highways ===
Champaign is served by I-57, I-72, I-74, two railroad lines, and the University of Illinois operated Willard Airport (CMI).

Interstate 57 enters in Champaign County after a diamond interchange with Curtis Road. It makes two Cloverleaf interchanges with Interstate 72 towards Decatur, Illinois, and the second (soon to be changed) Cloverleaf interchange with Interstate 74 in Illinois to Indianapolis. After making the two major interchanges, it runs out of Champaign County with a Partial cloverleaf interchange with U.S. Route 45 to Rantoul, Illinois. Interstate 74 starts with U.S. Route 150 in Illinois with Mahomet, Illinois, it makes two total interchanges within the city's limits. After making those interchanges, it makes one interchange with Interstate 57. After making the main interchange it starts to make interchanges with the city's streets. Interstate 74 goes out of Champaign County with St. Joseph, Illinois. Interstate 72 enters Champaign County with an interchange towards Monticello and north towards Mahomet after the main route that heads north crosses Interstate 74. Interstate 72 then heads into the cloverleaf interchange with Interstate 57 and then continues east for 1 1/2 to 2 miles eventually terminating itself at University Avenue on the southeast side of Champaign.

Interstate Highways
Interstate 57
Interstate 72
Interstate 74

US Highways
US 45
US 150

Illinois Highways
Route 10

=== Mass transit ===
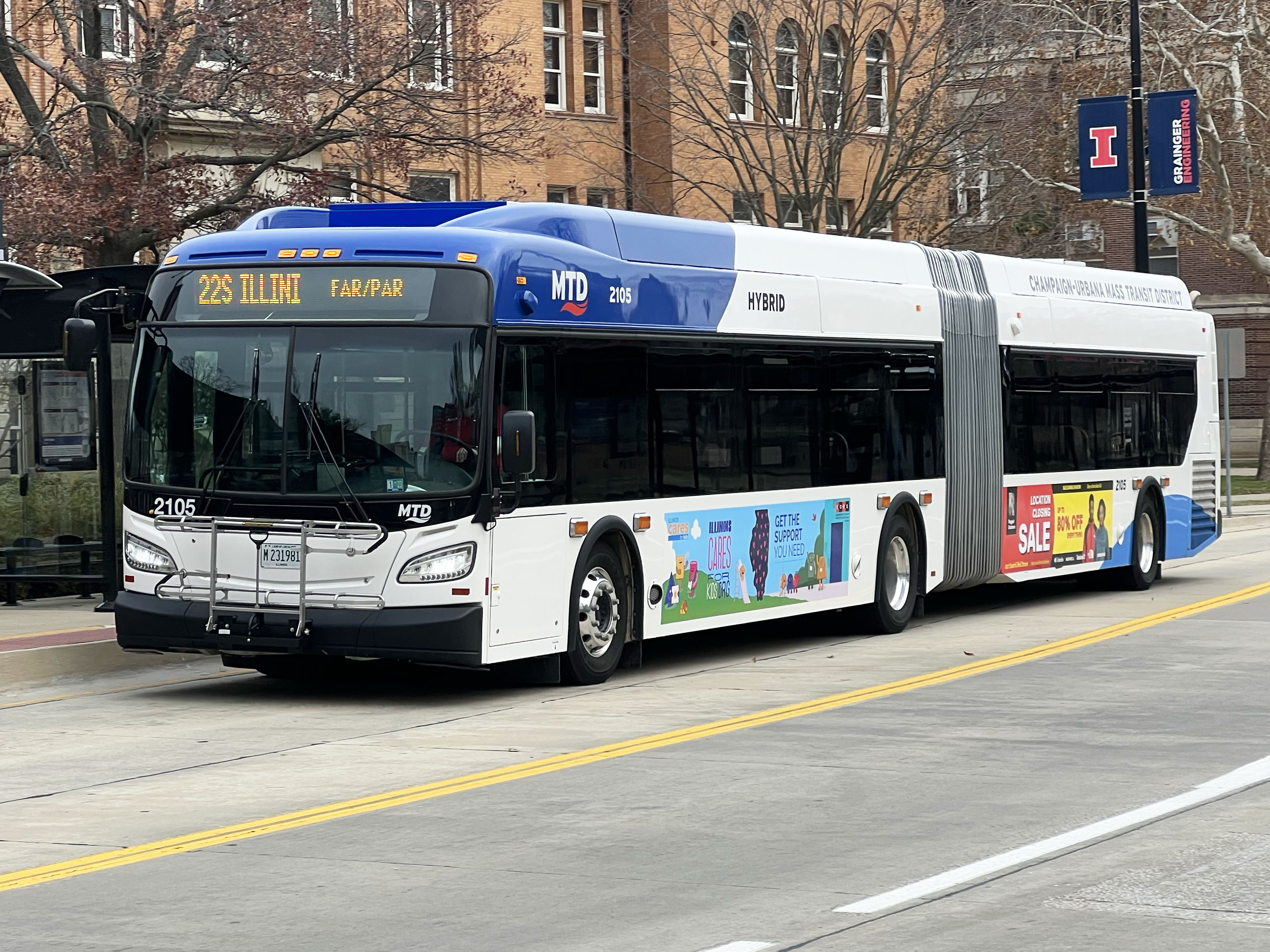
A Champaign–Urbana Mass Transit District (MTD) bus

In 1999, a newly designed intermodal transportation center, aptly named Illinois Terminal by historic reference to the defunct electric interurban rail line that once ran through Champaign, was completed and serves as a central facility for intercity passenger rail, bus services as well as the MTD's local bus network. Danville Mass Transit and Champaign County Area Rural Transit System, which primarily provide transit services to Danville and Rantoul respectively, have connecting services to Illinois Terminal.

The local bus system, which is supported by the taxpayers of the Champaign–Urbana Mass Transit District (MTD) and the University of Illinois, serves Champaign, Urbana, Savoy, and surrounding areas. The C-U MTD has twice been named as the best local transit system in the United States.

C-CARTS provides bus service connecting Champaign, Urbana and Rantoul.

=== Rail ===
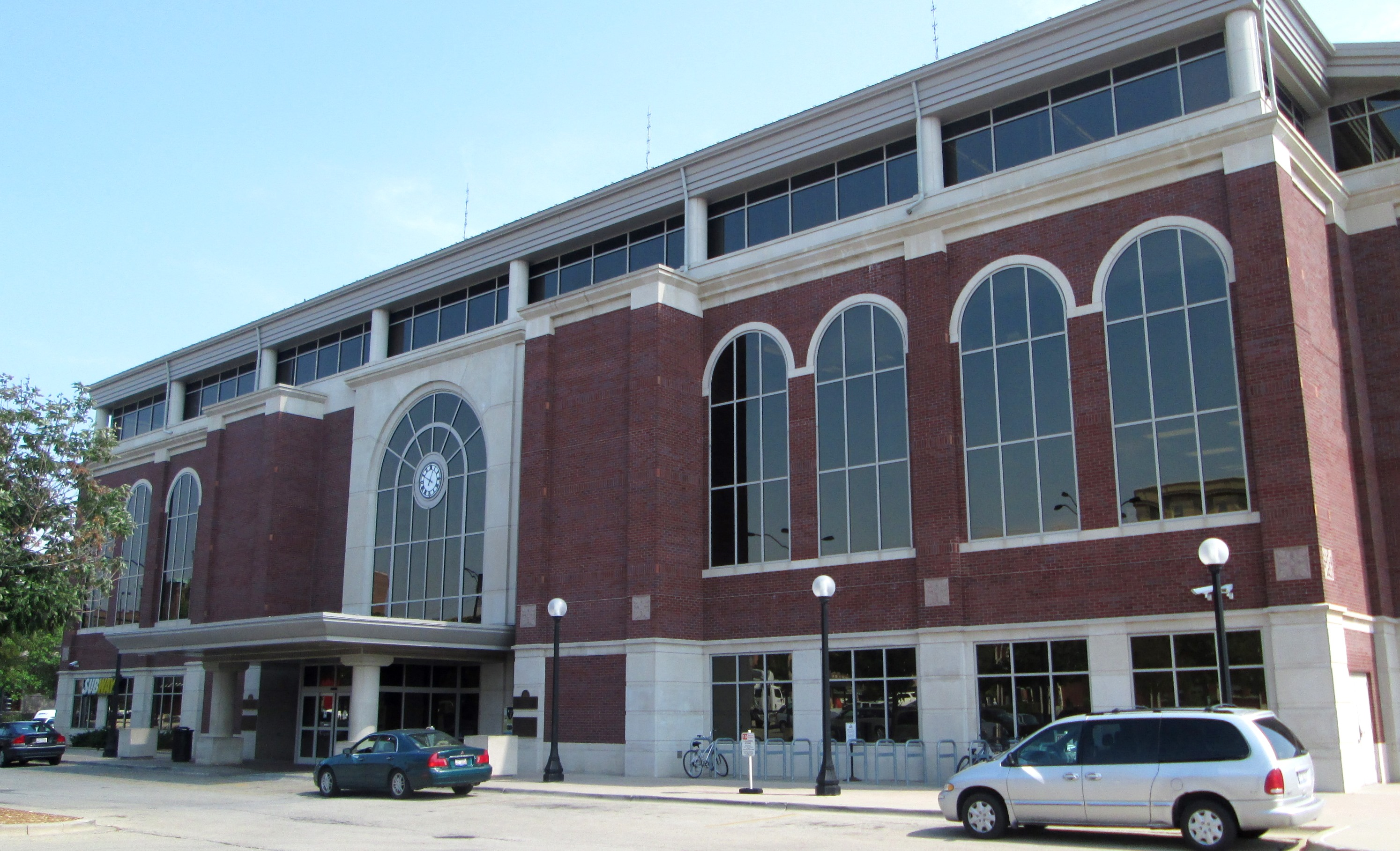
Illinois Terminal

Amtrak provides service to Champaign–Urbana out of Illinois Terminal by: Train 58/59, the City of New Orleans; Train 390/391, the Saluki; and Train 392/393, the Illini.

The former Illinois Central Railroad line—now part of the Canadian National Railway system—runs north to south through the city. A spur line from the Canadian National line provides service to several large industries, including two large food processing plants, on the west edge of Champaign and two grain elevators in outlying communities to the west. Norfolk Southern Railway operates an east-to-west line through Champaign, connecting eastern Urbana to the Norfolk Southern main line at Mansfield, Illinois, along the former Peoria & Eastern Railway.

=== Intercity bus ===
Greyhound Lines, Peoria Charter Coach Company, and Burlington Trailways provide intercity bus service to Champaign. Lincoln Land Express, a Champaign-based bus service, shut down in 2013.

=== Airport ===
Champaign is served by Willard Airport (CMI) which is operated by the University of Illinois Urbana-Champaign. The airport is currently served by American Eagle offering daily flights to Chicago O'Hare International Airport and Dallas/Fort Worth International Airport. It was formerly home to the University of Illinois Institute of Aviation, which was established in 1945 and absorbed by Parkland College in 2014.

== See also ==
- Champaign–Urbana metropolitan area
- Triaxial Earthquake and Shock Simulator, experimental device located in Champaign.
