= Champaign–Decatur combined statistical area =

Coordinates: 40°0′N 88°40′W

Central Illinois Metro
- Combined Statistical Area
- Champaign-Decatur CSA
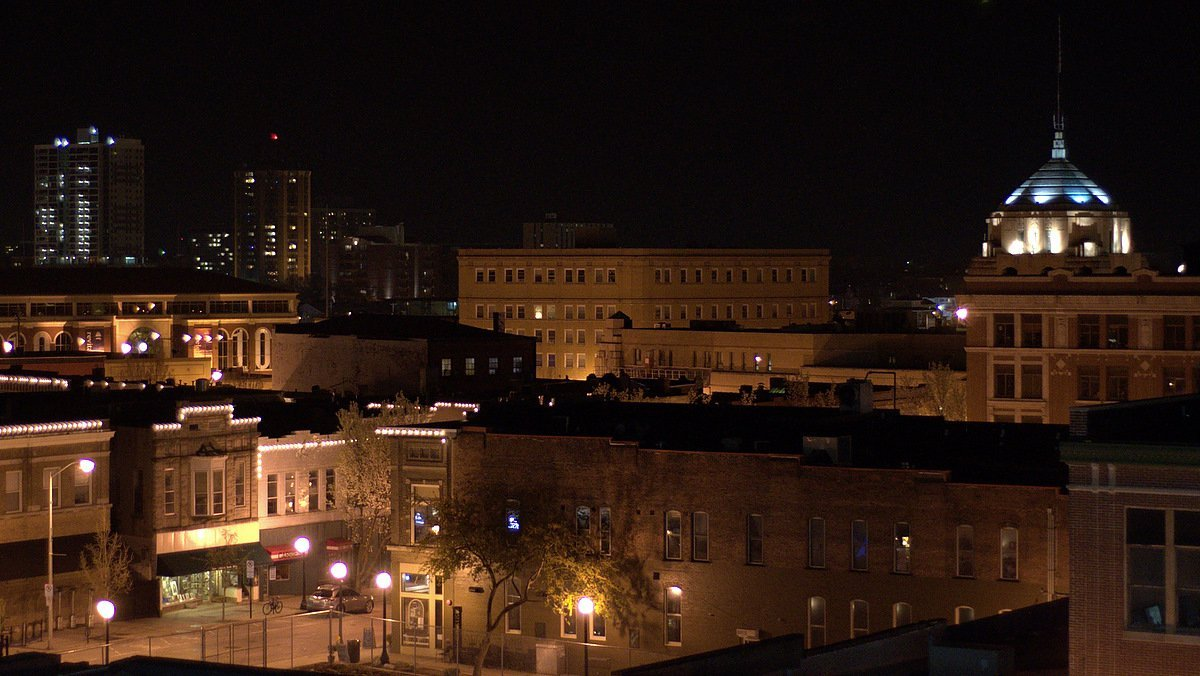
- Champaign skyline from Neil street

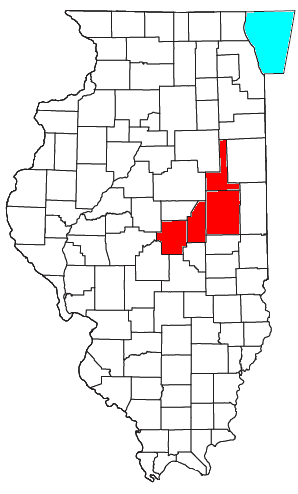
- Champaign, Macon, Ford, and Piatt counties shown in red. Illinois portion of Lake Michigan shown in light blue.
- Country: United States
- State: Illinois
- Principal cities: Champaign; Decatur; Urbana

Area
  - Combined Statistical Area: 2,509 sq mi (6,500 km^{2})
  - Land: 2,499 sq mi (6,470 km^{2})
  - Water: 8.2 sq mi (21 km^{2})

Population (2014 Census estimate)Urban figure
  - Density: 10,970/sq mi (4,234/km^{2})
  - Urban: 311,212
  - Metro: 231,891
  - MSA: 231,891
  - CSA: 344,440
- Time zone: UTC-5 (CST)
  - Summer (DST): UTC-4 (CDT)
- Area code: 217

The Champaign-Decatur CSA, also known as East Central Illinois CSA, was a combined statistical area in the U.S. State of Illinois. It was the 104th largest combined statistical area in the U.S. It was composed of four counties, Champaign, Ford, Piatt and Macon.

By 2020 the area had been subdivided such that the city of Decatur was defined separately as a Metropolitan Statistical Area, and the remainder approximately forms the newer Champaign-Urbana Metropolitan Statistical Area.

The area had a population of 344,440 as determined by the 2010 U.S. Census. The area is anchored by the principal cities of Champaign and Decatur and is home to the University of Illinois at Urbana–Champaign, the flagship campus of the University of Illinois system. (University students, even those from outside the area, are included in Census figures if they were counted by the federal Census).

== Counties ==
- Champaign 204,897
- Macon 109,278
- Piatt 16,433
- Ford 13,832

== Urban core development ==
Recently, Champaign has seen its skyline go up. At the University of Illinois campus, Memorial Stadium has gone under major renovation and construction of new stands, clubs and luxury suites. In Campustown, a new 24-story highrise apartment building has been completed and is 256 feet (78 m) tall. The highrise, called 309 Green, is three stories higher than the older 21-story Tower at Third. The Burnham 310 Project, at 18 stories, which is also taller (in overall height), was finished in the fall of 2008 and includes student luxury apartments and a County Market grocery store. Burnham 310 connects downtown Champaign to Campustown. In the past year (2013–14) four other mixed use buildings (apartments over commercial) have built in Campustown, with heights of 26, 13, 8, and 5 stories. In downtown, the new 9 story M2 on Neil project is completed. M2 has offices, retail, and condos. A Hyatt Place boutique hotel has recently opened in downtown Champaign. These, among other developments, are giving the city a more urban feel.

== Outlying areas ==
The outlying parts of the metropolitan area differ from the suburban areas of many other metropolitan areas. Instead of a sprawling suburban skirt that encircles the urban area, the urban area abuts large swaths of farmland, with small to medium-sized villages that originated as farming communities. But, as the willingness of professionals to commute longer distances has increased in recent decades, new residential developments have arisen on their edges, dotting the surrounding landscape. Some of these villages are home to as many as 5,000 residents or more, but most are significantly smaller.

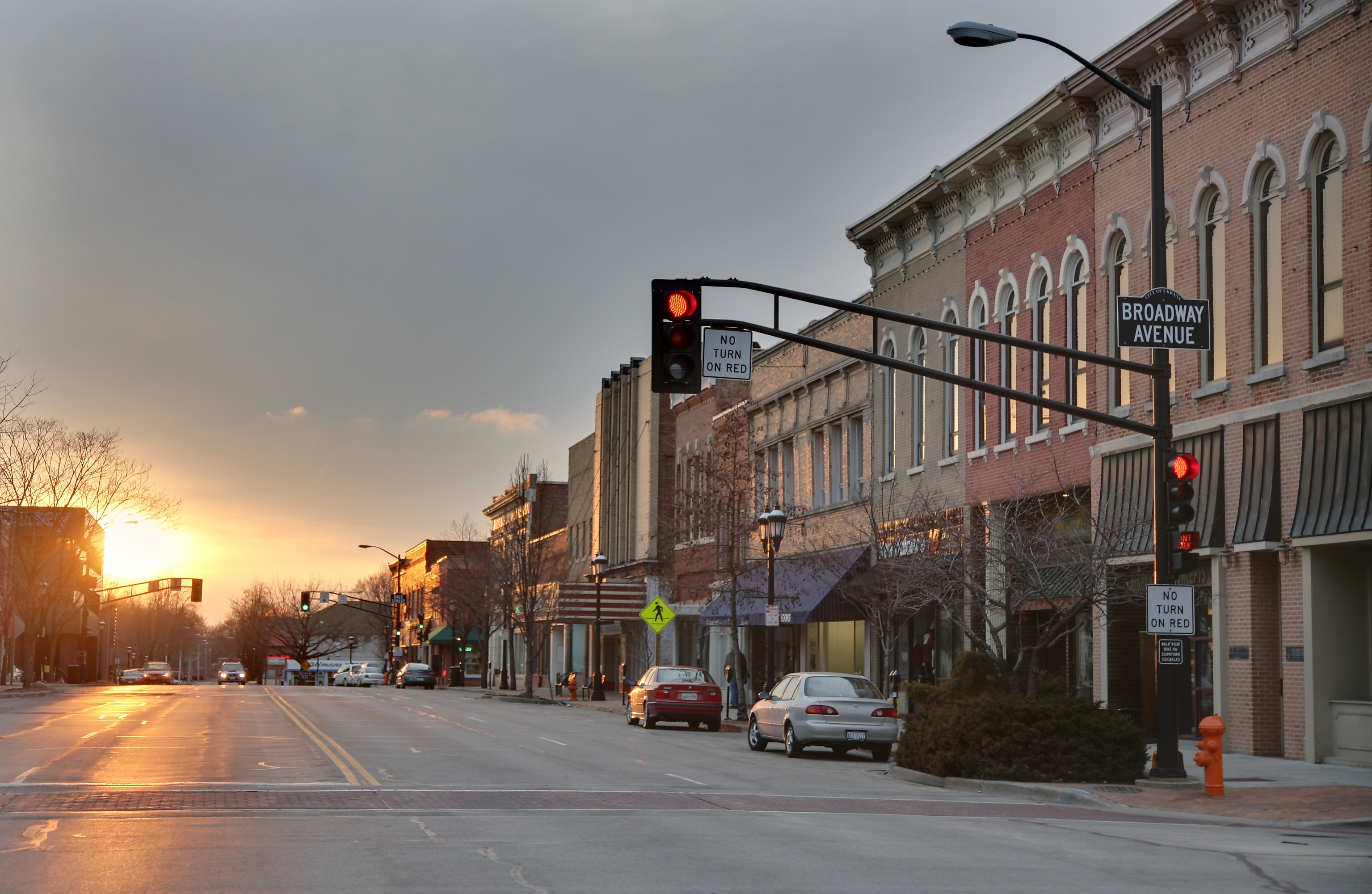
View of Downtown Urbana

Most of these outlying communities, such as Savoy, Mahomet, St. Joseph, and arguably Rantoul and Monticello as well, are dependent on Champaign and Urbana for economic and infrastructure support. Predominantly, these cities and villages lie in Champaign County. These areas are populated to a substantial extent with commuters who work in Champaign or Urbana, but reside outside of the two cities. Because higher paid professors, doctors and technology professionals who work for the University of Illinois at Urbana–Champaign, the many clinics and hospitals in town, or in the Research Park, are more likely to maintain cars for commuting longer distances and to afford owner-occupied single-family housing, these areas lacking in mass transit and high-density rental projects often have a higher median household income than Champaign or Urbana.

In addition to residential developments in the surrounding, formerly agricultural communities, residential neighborhoods are also growing up in unincorporated areas within a short radius of the city limits, while the cities themselves are also expanding to annex areas of new development. While the annexed areas benefit from municipal services, developments that are willing to forego city sewer systems, libraries and police protection can enjoy the lower tax rates the surrounding townships levy, as fewer services are provided. Areas currently under construction extend as far as around Rising Road west of I-57 and north and east of Willard Airport. Some of this land is in Champaign Township, while some has been annexed to either Champaign or Savoy. Additional land development is occurring north of I-74 in land annexed by both Champaign and Urbana. On the eastern side of the city of Urbana, new business developments such as a Meijer, a planned Menards, and a commercial center with many restaurants and services have broken ground, as well as more suburban housing.

The issue of land development is often hotly contested by local governments. In addition to arguments for and against development, the question of potential annexations, which remove property tax revenues from the surrounding townships while increasing the urban tax base (but also the demands on urban services) is a point of constant strife between the cities and the surrounding townships. On the other hand, the availability of higher-valued housing in areas belonging to the townships or surrounding villages, which is paid for by workers earning their money within the urban infrastructure also represents a movement of potential tax dollars from Champaign and Urbana to their dependent areas.

== Tourism and recreation ==
=== Museums ===
- Champaign County Historical Museum. Located in the Historic Cattle Bank built in 1858. Features exhibits on the history of the area and the midwest as a whole.
- Chanute Aerospace Museum. Showcases Illinois' role in aviation, featuring several hangars of planes on exhibit (Located in nearby Rantoul).
- Museum of the Grand Prairie. Features historic exhibits on life in the early midwest.
- Krannert Art Museum. Art Museum featuring both modern and classical art. Many changing exhibits.
- Orpheum Children's Science Museum. A hands on science museum for children.
- Spurlock Museum. Over 46,000 artifacts on display focusing around human culture and history throughout the world. Features some of the largest exhibits on Native North American and South American history in the nation.
- Monticello Railway Museum. Railroad museum with exhibits focused on central Illinois. Main attraction is the operating tourist railroad.

=== Parks and recreation ===
- Champaign Park District features many parks, hiking trails, and biking trails in the city of Champaign.
- Urbana Park District includes exercise and biking trails, Crystal Lake, a sculpture park, and other public facilities in the city of Urbana.
- Robert Allerton Park a private estate donated to the University consisting of a large manor house (now a conference center), formal gardens, and natural woodlands and prairie. Open to the public. Local Macon County park resources include Lake Decatur, Lincoln Trail Homestead State Memorial, Rock Springs Conservation Area, Fort Daniel Conservation Area, Sand Creek Recreation Area, Griswold Conservation Area, Friends Creek Regional Park, and Spitler Woods State Natural Area. The Decatur Park District resources include 2,000 acres of park land, an indoor sports center, Decatur Airport, three golf courses, softball, soccer and tennis complexes, athletic fields, a community aquatic center, AZA-accredited zoo, and a banquet, food & beverage business. Decatur, at one time was dubbed "Park City U.S.A." because it had more parks per person that any other city in the country.

== Colleges and universities ==
- The University of Illinois at Urbana-Champaign is located jointly in Urbana and Champaign and is the flagship campus for the University of Illinois system.
- Parkland College is a community college located in Champaign.
- Millikin University (enrollment 2,400), a four-year institution of higher education, has a 75-acre (300,000 m^{2}) campus founded by James Millikin and was originally affiliated with the Presbyterian Church (U.S.A.).
- Richland Community College (enrollment 3,500) is a comprehensive community college. It also hosts the biannual Farm Progress Show.

== Health ==
The Champaign-Decatur Metro area is home to two hospitals, the Carle Foundation Hospital, and Provena Covenant Medical Center, with a combined total of over 550 physicians. Both hospitals are located less than a mile apart on University Avenue in Urbana. Both hospitals provide various specialized services, and Carle Hospital currently has a Level III Neonatal Intensive Care Unit, a Level I Trauma Center, and a medical helicopter service. Both hospitals are currently having to face the fact that their tax-exempt statuses are being revoked by the State of Illinois.

Carle Foundation Physician Services, formerly Carle Clinic Association until its purchase by The Carle Foundation in 2010. maintains several locations next to the hospital as well as other locations within C-U and other East Central Illinois cities. Christie Clinic, another smaller multispeciality group practice, is headquartered in downtown Champaign. They are largely affiliated with Provena Covenant Medical Center but are not as closely linked as their Carle counterparts.

Both hospitals and clinics are affiliated with the University of Illinois College of Medicine at Urbana, part of the larger University of Illinois College of Medicine, which has campuses in Chicago, Peoria, Rockford, and Urbana. The College has a teaching presence at both hospitals, although the facilities are somewhat more extensive at Carle Foundation Hospital.

== Arts and culture ==
The Virginia Theatre in Downtown Champaign

The Champaign-Decatur CSA Area is home to many theatres. The University is home to three theatre venues; Foellinger Auditorium, Assembly Hall and the Krannert Center for the Performing Arts. While the Assembly Hall is primarily a campus basketball and concert arena, the Krannert Center for the Performing Arts is considered to be one of the nation's top venues for performance and hosts over 400 performances annually. Built in 1969, the Krannert Center's facilities cover over four acres (16,000 m^{2}) of land, and features four theatres and an amphitheatre.

The Historic Virginia Theatre in downtown Champaign is a public venue owned by the city of Champaign and administered by the Champaign Park District. It is best known for hosting Roger Ebert's Film Festival which occurs annually during the last week of April. It features a variety of performances from community theatre with the Champaign Urbana Theatre Company, to post box-office showings of popular films, current artistic films, live musical performances (both orchestral and popular), and other types of shows. First commissioned in 1921, it originally served as a venue for both film and live performances, but became primarily a movie house in the 1950s. Occasional live events were held during the 1970s and 1980s, including a live production of "Oh, Calcutta" and performances by George Benson, Stevie Ray Vaughan, Missing Persons, and the Indigo Girls. GKC Corporation closed the Virginia as a movie house on February 13, 1992, with the final regular film being Steve Martin's "Father of the Bride". The theatre once again began holding regular live performances when it was leased to local gospel singer David Wyper in 1992. The Champaign-Urbana Theatre Company was formed to perform major musicals and opened their first season with "The Music Man" that June. Control passed to the Virginia Theatre group in 1996 and the theatre became a non-profit public venue. The Champaign Park District assumed control of the facilities in 2000. Its original Wurlitzer theatre pipe organ has been maintained by Warren York since 1988 and is still played regularly.

The Art Theater in downtown Champaign began as Champaign's first theatre devoted to movies, the Park, in 1912, and is a small venue showing films not normally playing at the box office. The theatre is the only single-screen movie theatre with daily operation as a movie theatre in Champaign-Urbana. The Virginia, which hosts Roger Ebert's Annual Overlooked Film Festival, is also single-screen, but only opens for special showings and events. Rapp and Rapp's 1914 Orpheum Theatre closed in the mid-1980s and now houses a children's science museum.

Parkland College in Champaign features a small theatre called the Parkland College Theatre and a planetarium called the William M. Staerkel Planetarium.

The area has originated a great deal of musical talent, including artists such as REO Speedwagon, Head East, Dan Fogelberg and including HUM, Poster Children, Hardvark, The Moon Seven Times, Braid, Castor, National Skyline, Absinthe Blind, Headlights and The Beauty Shop. Some lesser-known artists like Alma Afrobeat Ensemble, Zirafa and Spinnerty, Øde Vinter, UC Hiphop, and Zmick are also native to the region.

The cities now host Pygmalion Music Festival on an annual basis, presented by the Nicodemus Agency and Krannert Center for the Performing Arts. Past performers include Iron and Wine, The Books, Yacht, Rjd2, Yo La Tengo, Black Mountain, Asobi Seksu, Times New Viking, of Montreal, Danielson, Man Man, Okkervil River, Andrew Bird, Questlove and more.

== Media ==
- Besides many print outlets, commercial radio stations, and TV stations, Champaign-Urbana has several academic, homegrown and not-for-profit media outlets.
- WEFT 90.1 FM is a community radio station begun by a group of radio enthusiasts, artists, and community-minded individuals working together to realize the potential of bringing a variety of programming and people together behind one frequency. Since 1981, WEFT has broadcast music from around the world and East Central Illinois, news, and public affairs on shows hosted by an all-volunteer staff of air shifters. It also airs programming from national sources including Pacific.
- WRFU-LP is a low power community radio station owned and operated by Radio Free Urbana. The station was built by hundreds of volunteers from the region and around the country in November 2005 at the ninth Prometheus Radio Project barnraising. WRFU broadcasts music, news, public affairs, and political activism (usually left-leaning) to listeners at 104.5FM.
- Illini Media, located at 5th and Green in campustown, is home to the college's alternative radio station WPGU 107.1. The Illini Media Building is also home to the Daily Illini, the student-run daily newspaper, and Buzz Weekly which has quickly become a popular source for arts & entertainment news in the Champaign-Urbana area.
- Smile Politely, an online magazine focused on arts, entertainment and alternative news, opened in 2007 and is seen as the successor to previous print efforts like The Octopus, and The Hub Weekly.
- Herald & Review —Daily owned by Lee Enterprises
- Decatur Tribune —Weekly
- The Decaturian —Bi-weekly student newspaper published by Millikin University
- Re:Decatur —Online Community Paper
- Decatur Magazine —Bi-monthly
- Thrive —Monthly
- 17 WAND, NBC
- WBGL —88.1 FM —Christian radio
- WDCR (FM) —88.9 FM —Relevant Radio
- WJMU —89.5 FM —Millikin University —Alternative rock
- WYDS —93.1 FM —Top 40
- WDZQ —95.1 FM —Country music
- WXFM —99.3 —Light Hits
- WZUS —100.9 FM —Talk radio
- WSOY —102.9 FM —Top 40
- WEJT —105.1 FM —Adult hits
- WKIO —105.5 FM —Classic rock
- WZNX —106.7 FM —Classic rock
- WDKR —107.3 —Oldies

== Transportation ==
Interstate 74 runs east–west through Champaign and Urbana. Interstate 57 runs north–south through the west part of Champaign. Interstate 72 terminates at Champaign. U.S. Routes 45 and 150 pass through the cities as well.

The Champaign-Urbana area is served by the Champaign-Urbana Mass Transit District, which has its main interchange at Illinois Terminal where it connects with Amtrak, Burlington Trailways, Greyhound Lines and Peoria Charter Coach Company intercity services. Greyhound Lines also provides service to Decatur.

The Champaign County Area Rural Transit System provides transit service primarily in and around Rantoul, while the SHOW Bus serves Ford and Macon counties.

The Decatur Public Transit System (DPTS) provides fixed route bus service as well as complementary door-to-door paratransit service for people with disabilities, who are unable to use the bus system, throughout the City of Decatur. Under an agreement with the Village of Forsyth, service is also provided to the Hickory Point Mall area in Forsyth.

The area is served by the Champaign, Illinois Amtrak station at Illinois Terminal. The line serves the Chicago to New Orleans route, City of New Orleans train, as well as Chicago to Carbondale Illini and Saluki trains.

University of Illinois Willard Airport is to the south of Champaign, serving Envoy Air. Decatur Airport has hosted notable visitors Presidents John F. Kennedy and Ronald Reagan, Vice-President Dan Quayle, and Soviet Leader Mikhail Gorbachev (at the invitation of his long-time friend, Dwayne Andreas, former CEO of Archer Daniels Midland).

== Sports ==
While greater Champaign-Urbana does not feature any professional sports teams, the University of Illinois fields many teams which compete in the Big Ten Conference. Two large sports centers (Memorial Stadium and the State Farm Center, formerly the Assembly Hall) are located in the south-east portion of Champaign. Memorial Stadium is a football arena where the Fighting Illini football team plays, and the State Farm Center is the home of the highly successful Fighting Illini basketball team. The NFL's Chicago Bears played in Memorial Stadium for the 2002 season while Soldier Field was being modernized and refurbished.

The city of Champaign has been working with the Frontier League to create a privately owned professional baseball team. The team was scheduled to start playing in the 2009 baseball season, but was delayed in 2008 to the 2010 season at the earliest. Since then however, there has been no development on the matter.

The University of Illinois hosted the 2013 NCAA Division I Men's and Women's Tennis Championships in May at the Kahn Outdoor Tennis Complex next to the Atkins Tennis Center and Eichelberger Field just south of Florida Avenue in Urbana. The Illini Men's Tennis team won the 2003 NCAA tennis championships and is highly ranked nationally.

== Notable people ==
The following people are from the Champaign–Urbana Metropolitan Area or attended the University of Illinois at Urbana-Champaign:

- Marc Andreessen, software engineer; co-writer of the web browser Mosaic
- John Bardeen, two-time Nobel Prize winner in Physics
- Bonnie Blair, Olympic speedskater
- Braid, rock group
- Dick Butkus, hall of fame NFL football player, played for U of I
- Iris Chang, book author, historian
- Roger Ebert, film critic
- Dave Eggers, writer
- David Foster Wallace, writer
- Jennie Garth, actress, director
- Red Grange, Illinois football RB, Chicago Bears RB, NFL Hall of Famer, #1 Big Ten Icon
- Steven Hager, founder of the Cannabis Cup, editor-in-chief of High Times magazine
- Erika Harold, Miss America 2003
- Hugh Hefner, founder of Playboy
- Nick Holonyak, Jr., inventor of the visible light-emitting diode
- Hum, rock group
- Jimmy John, owner of the sandwich chain Jimmy Johns
- Robert L. Johnson, Creator of BET
- Alison Krauss, bluegrass singer
- Jonathan Kuck, Olympic speed skater
- Don Laz, Olympic Pole Vault Helsinki Silver Medalist
- Ang Lee, filmmaker
- Ludacris, rapper
- Jack McDuff, jazz organist and organ trio bandleader
- Nina Paley, cartoonist, illustrator, and blogger
- Katherine Reutter, Olympic speed skater
- Hamilton O. Smith, won Nobel Prize in Physiology or Medicine in 1978
- REO Speedwagon, rock group
- Starcastle, progressive rock group
- David Ogden Stiers attended high school in Urbana (with Roger Ebert)
- Thelma Strabel, novelist
- James Tobin, won Nobel Memorial Prize in Economics in 1981.
- George Will, political columnist
- Timothy Zahn, Hugo-award-winning author attended U of I and began his writing career there
- Blake Schilb, an American professional basketball player
- The Red Hot Valentines, a power-pop band
