= WRFU =

WRFU may refer to:

- Wellington Rugby Football Union
- WRFU-LP, a low-power radio station (104.5 FM) licensed to Urbana, Illinois, United States
