= AMASONG =

Amateur choir in Champaign-Urbana, Illinois

- Choir
- Origin: Champaign-Urbana, Illinois
- Founded: 1990
- Founder: Kristina Boerger
- Members: 60

AMASONG is a lesbian/feminist amateur choir based in Champaign-Urbana, Illinois. The group was created by Kristina Boerger in 1990. The group consists of about sixty women who perform female-oriented, folkloric, and classical music.

== Foundation ==
In 1990, a year before beginning her master's degree in choral conducting at the University of Illinois at Urbana–Champaign, Kristina Boerger decided to form what she advertised as a lesbian/feminist chorus called AMASONG. The group's name is a portmanteau on the words amazon and song. Boerger said, "The word amazon conjures up images of strong women who make their own decisions. It was a way of coding our group in a certain way."

Boerger posted flyers around town about her new choral group, AMASONG. Many local women responded to the flyers. A roomful of women showed up at the first choir rehearsal, consisting mainly of lesbians, feminist housewives and students. Boerger said that the decision to label AMASONG as lesbian/feminist was important. In the PBS documentary produced by Jay Rosenstein, entitled, The AMASONG Chorus: Singing Out, Boerger explained, "There's lesbian-feminism with a hyphen, which refers to woman who are lesbian and feminist. But if you put a diagonal slash between, then it means either or. And that's very important. Whenever I tell people on the phone who we are, I make sure they get the punctuation correct. It doesn't mean you have to be both to get in the choir. It means you've got to be one or the other." The choir's first members were diverse in interest, age and experience. An environment that encourages cross-community dialogue, allowing members to better understand the experiences of their "...sisters in a place that by its feminist orientation, appreciates and dignifies them...".

== Music genre ==
AMASONG's repertoire is heavily inspired by folk music from various global cultural traditions, music written by women, and other genres of music reflecting women's life experiences.

== Leadership ==
AMASONG records and performs regularly. As of 2020, it is under the direction of choir director Heidi Weatherford. Past directors include Jill Crandall, Meagan Johnson, Esther Gille, Margot Rejskind, and Deborah Skydell.

Founding director Kristina Boerger stepped down from her position as choir director and relocated to New York City in 2000. New York was her performance and teaching base until 2009. She is currently Director of University Choirs at the DePauw School of Music, where her Chamber Singers have performed by invitation at the White House. She has lectured in music history at Barnard College and taught choral conducting at the Manhattan School of Music. Each summer Boerger joins the faculty of the Madison Early Music Festival as a conductor, soprano, and course instructor. She tours and records with the Pomerium Renaissance vocal ensemble and toured and performed for nine years with the Western Wind, which is an a cappella sextet. In addition, she has recorded for Bobby McFerrin and collaborated on works for movement and vocal ensemble with the Christopher Caines Dancers.

AMASONG stopped rehearsals in spring 2020 due to the COVID-19 pandemic. In the fall of 2023, the group reorganized and resumed live concerts once again.

== History ==
In discussing Amasong's 1997 performance of Billie Holiday's "Strange Fruit", choral director Kristina Boerger commented on the artistic opportunities provided by the gay and lesbian choral movement. According to Boerger, such settings welcomed programming choices that might not be accepted in other choirs. She stated, "I would not expect a job conducting a choir in the usual church, academic or civic setting to permit me a program something like "Strange Fruit". But in the context of gay and lesbian choral movements, this kind of programming is not questioned." The same source also suggests that the song's resonance within the movement reflected both the prominence of influential performers such as Bessie Smith and Billie Holiday, both of whose queerness is often referred to as an "open secret", who sang of relationships with women, and a broader sense of solidarity between historically marginalized communities.

== Awards ==
- 1999, GLAMA award for Best Choral Group — for "Shenandoah", an American folk song arranged by Kristina Boerger for a cappella chorus. "Shenandoah" is from AMASONG's Amai CD.
- 1999, GLAMA award for Best Contemporary Classical Composition — for "Draum om Nedsnodde Bruer" ("Dream of Snow-covered Bridges"), composed by Kristina Boerger and Michael Cameron for women's voices and double bass accompaniment. "Draum" is from AMASONG's Amai CD.
- 1997, GLAMA (Gay and Lesbian American Music Award) for Best Choral Group for its four-voice, a cappella version of Billie Holiday's Strange Fruit.— from AMASONG's debut CD, Over Here the Water is Sweet, arranged by Kristina Boerger.

== Albums ==
- 2014, Everything She Touches Changes
- 2008, Bridges of Song
- 2003, Laulu Voim: The Power of Song
- 2000, Amai
- 1997, Over Here the Water is Sweet
