= Illinois Marathon =

American for-profit athletics race

- The Illinois Marathon logo
- Date: Fourth weekend in April
- Location: Campustown, Champaign, Urbana, Savoy, U.S. ending at Memorial Stadium
- Event type: road
- Distance: Marathon
- Established: 2009
- Course records: 2:18:11 Wilson Chemweno (male); 2:36:51 Margaret Njuguna (female)
- Website: www.illinoismarathon.com
- Participants: approx. 11,000 (As of 2025)

The Illinois Marathon is a for-profit marathon which was held for the first time on April 11, 2009 in Champaign, Illinois. This was the first marathon ever held in Champaign. The course is very flat and it produces fast times, with only 85 feet (26 m) of elevation change. Race weekends have been held annually on the fourth weekend in April since 2009, with the only cancellation to date being the 2020 Race Weekend as a result of the COVID-19 pandemic. The races offered are:

- marathon (42.195 kilometres (26.219 mi))
- half marathon (21.0975 kilometres (13.1094 mi))
- wheelchair half marathon (21.0975 kilometres (13.1094 mi))
- four-person marathon relay
- 10K run
- 5K run
- 1-kilometre (0.62 mi) youth races
- 1 Mile run
- I-Challenges (multiple races over the weekend)

The race attracted over 8,000 finishers in the first year. There were approximately 14,000–15,000 participants at the 10th annual event in 2019. The Illinois Marathon is a qualifying marathon for the Boston Marathon. The full marathon distance was omitted in 2021–2023 due to challenges with availability of public safety personnel to staff the full marathon distance course. In 2024, the full marathon distance returned, along with a new course map that included portions of the neighboring village of Savoy.

== Course information ==
The Illinois Marathon course is set throughout Champaign, Urbana, and Savoy. A large portion of the race is run on the University of Illinois at Urbana–Champaign campus. The starting line is near the University of Illinois' State Farm Center. The races finish at the 50-yard line of Zuppke Field in Memorial Stadium.

== Traditions ==
=== Community Involvement ===
==== Annual Shoe Drive ====
At every Illinois Marathon since 2016, Jenette Jurczyk, National Director of The She Said Project, has organized the annual shoe drive for the runners to donate used shoes. Under the name, The Shoe Said Project, thousands of shoes have been collected and distributed to local agencies, as well as far reaching communities in developing nations, thanks to a partnership with the Share Your Soles Foundation.

== 2009 Illinois Marathon ==
Over 8,000 runners participated in the first annual Illinois Marathon. The 2009 Illinois Marathon Champaign was a central location in the Midwest, attracting runners from cities such as Minneapolis, Chicago and St. Louis. Based on a report done by the Champaign Sports Commission, the total estimated economic gain from the year's marathon was nearly $4.4 million. Amongst the biggest changes made in the 2010 race will be the course route. Due to traffic issues at Meadowbrook Park in Urbana last year, where parts of the race were held, runners will now be heading into the park at mile marker 8 instead of 4.

=== Notable Events ===
==== Volunteers Rally ====
The inaugural Illinois Marathon was near cancellation due to the lack of volunteers as of March 16, 2009. The event had about 100 volunteers and needed about 100 to 150 more in order to hold the race safely. Local officials set an April 1, 2009 deadline for the event planners to have enough staff to keep the 7,600 runners safe at the 311 intersections crossed during the race. Lt. Jon Swenson of the Champaign Police Department said, "There's people coming from all over the continental United States and four foreign countries, and it's not something you can cancel on a moment's notice. We indicated our concerns to them about the urgency to get their volunteers secured so we know we're prepared to move forward with the event." After the information that the marathon might get canceled was made public, 350 people volunteered within four days.

=== 2009 Marathon Results ===
==== Finishers ====
Marathon	Half Marathon	Marathon Relay (4-person teams)	5K	Wheelchair	Total
1620	3752	195	1933	14	8099

==== Male Overall Results ====
Place	Participant Name	Time
1.	Jacob Kendagor	2:26:12
2.	Lars Juhl	2:27:15
3.	Ben Schneider	2:28:29

==== Female Overall Results ====
Place	Participant Name	Time
1.	Meghan Kennihan	2:55:06
2.	Krista Colberg	2:58:33
3.	Tracy Wollschlager	3:01:52

== 2010 Illinois Marathon ==
The second annual Illinois Marathon offered five races: the full marathon, half marathon, marathon relay, 5k, and the 1-kilometer Busey Illinois Youth Run, all of which took place on Saturday, May 1, 2010. The total number of participants in all races was approximately 14,000 runners. As usual, roads along the race route were closed from 6:00 AM until approximately 3:00 PM on race day. A traffic beltway of roads along the outer areas of Champaign-Urbana not affected by the marathon was designated to facilitate travel for residents.

=== Notable Events ===
In September 2010, Christie Clinic (previously the title sponsor of the marathon and half-marathon) and six other Champaign-Urbana buyers purchased the Christie Clinic Illinois Marathon from the previous owner, Mark Knutson of Go Far Events in West Fargo, North Dakota.

=== 2010 Marathon Results ===
==== Finishers ====
Marathon	Half Marathon	Marathon Relay (4-person teams)	5K	Wheelchair	Total
1816	5630	316	2752	15	11477

==== Male Overall Results ====
Place	Participant Name	Time
1.	Marube Moninda	2:30:20
2.	Eric Wallor	2:31:33
3.	José Muñoz	2:32:14

==== Female Overall Results ====
Place	Participant Name	Time
1.	Tracy Wollschlager	3:00:23
2.	Hannah Norton	3:05:13
3.	Holly Fearing	3:06:11

== 2011 Illinois Marathon ==
The 2011 Illinois Marathon took place from Friday, April 29, 2011, to Saturday, April 30, 2011. New this year was the option of a 10k race in addition to the continuing full marathon, half marathon, marathon relay, 5k, and youth run. Additionally, the 5K was now held the Friday evening before the Saturday races. This enabled the additional I-Challenge component of the race, which is an optional "challenge" consisting of running both the Friday evening 5k and the full or half marathon on Saturday. Participants in the I-Challenge received an additional I-Challenge medal along with the medals for the two individual races.

=== 2011 Marathon Results ===
==== Male Overall Results ====
Place	Participant Name	Time
1.	José Muñoz	2:26:21
2.	Paul Howarth	2:29:58
3.	Jeffrey McClellan	2:30:56

==== Female Overall Results ====
Place	Participant Name	Time
1.	Lucy Mays-Sulewski	2:52:54
2.	Loryn Kromwey	2:58:09
3.	Holly Fearing	2:59:46

== 2012 Illinois Marathon ==
New this year was a wave start for the marathon and half marathon, rather than a separate starting time for each race. Additionally, the I-Challenge was expanded to include the option of a "Mini I-Challenge" which consisted of running the 5K run on Friday evening and the 10K run the next morning.

=== 2012 Marathon Results ===
==== Male Overall Results ====
Place	Participant Name	Time
1.	Jason Lokwatom	2:22:46
2.	Hillary Kogo	2:28:58
3.	Peter Kemboi	2:29:30

==== Female Overall Results ====
Place	Participant Name	Time
1.	Jackie Pirtle-Hall	2:43:52
2.	Michelle Corkum	2:55:48
3.	Julie Ralston	2:56:02

== 2024 Illinois Marathon ==
The 2024 event was the first time since 2019 that the full marathon was included. The race was almost canceled due to unrelated protests on the University of Illinois campus. 10,000 participants found out at 10:00pm the night before that the race was back on.

=== 2024 Marathon Results ===
==== Male Overall Results ====
Place	Participant Name	Time
1.	Jaime Marcus	2:29:46
2.	Dan Froeschle	2:30:32
3.	Jonnathan Fernandez	2:30:47

==== Female Overall Results ====
Place	Participant Name	Time
1.	Alexis Dorsey	2:57:58
2.	Brisa McGrath	2:59:03
3.	Rebecca Nussbaum	3:08:46

== 2025 Illinois Marathon ==
The 2025 event took place on April 26. During the marathon, a local dog escaped and joined the race, crossing the finish line with participants.

=== 2025 Marathon Results ===
==== Male Overall Results ====
Place	Participant Name	Time
1.	Jaime Marcos	2:22:23
2.	Martin O'Connell	2:26:04
3.	Caleb Kerr	2:26:09

==== Female Overall Results ====
Place	Participant Name	Time
1.	Tera Moody	2:47:21
2.	Jessica Roackafellow	2:50:11
3.	Alicia Hudelson	2:58:48
