= Decatur Tribune =

Weekly newspaper in Decatur, Illinois, US

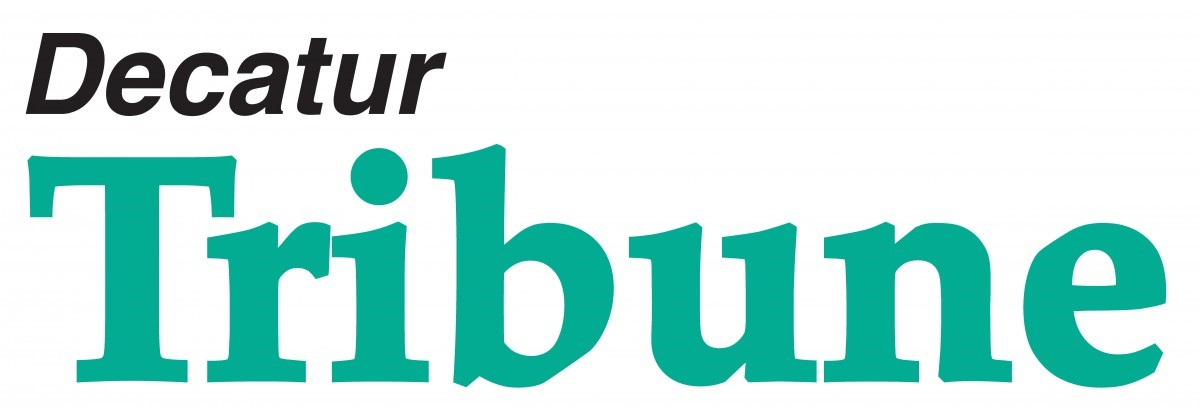
- Your Independent, Locally-Owned Weekly Newspaper
- Type: Weekly newspaper Community journalism
- Format: Tabloid
- Owner(s): Osborne Publications, Inc.
- Publisher: Paul Osborne
- Editor: Paul Osborne
- Founded: 1968
- Headquarters: 132 South Water St. Decatur, Illinois 62525; United States
- Circulation: 7,000
- OCLC number: 22753600
- Website: decaturtribune.com

The Decatur Tribune is an independent, locally owned weekly newspaper in Decatur, Illinois, USA, covering local news, sports, business, politics and community events in Decatur and Macon County.

== History ==
In December, 1969, Paul Osborne purchased the newspaper from Dr. V.W. Powell who had founded it one year earlier. It is a member of the Illinois Press Association and the Southern Illinois Editorial Association. The newspaper is a subscription publication, published once a week on Wednesday and distributed through the USPS and online.

== Featured articles ==
=== City Beat ===
Editor Paul Osborne's weekly article "City Beat" covers issues affecting his readers. He served as Mayor of the City of Decatur from 2003 to 2008, and is a weekly featured guest of radio station WSOY's "City Hall Insider".

=== Scrapbook ===
Weekly "Scrapbook" articles tell the stories of a historical nature taking place in or about the Decatur area.

=== Sports ===
For 45 years, J. Thomas McNamara wrote a weekly sports column in the Decatur Tribune titled "Irish Stew", covering Central Illinois high school sports. In 2015 he received the Illinois High School Association distinguished media service award. McNamara was a member of the Illinois Basketball Coaches Hall of Fame, Macon County Sports Historian and an author of five books on local sports. He is credited with being the drive behind the establishment of the Decatur School District's Sports Hall of Fame.

== Other Decatur Tribune's ==
There were two prior papers printed as the Decatur Tribune. The first was established in 1864 by Joseph M. Prior and in 1865 Isaac N. Coltrin became his partner. The second was founded in 1872 by William L. Hammer. It was published for two years until it merged with The Magnet in 1874.

== Sources ==
- Illinois Press Association, Illinois Newspaper Directory
- United States Newspaper Listing,
