= Absinthe Blind =

American musical group

- Origin: Champaign, Illinois, US
- Genres: Shoegaze, dream pop
- Years active: 1996–2003
- Labels: Hammerhead Records, Mud Records, Parasol Records
- Past members: Adam Fein (guitar, vocals); Seth Fein (drums); Tristan Wraight (guitar, keyboards); Mike Zolfo (bass) (1996-2002); Erin Fein (keyboards, vocals) (1999-2003); Brett Sanderson (bass, programming) (2002-2003); Lynn Canfield (vocals) (1998); Clarissa Novales (vocals) (1999); Cherie Earl (vocals) (1999); Yichel Chan (guitar) (1999-2001)
- Website: Last FM

Absinthe Blind was an American shoegaze and dream pop group from Urbana, Illinois. The first group was formed by brothers Seth and Adam Fein and Tristan Wraight in 1996, by merging Adam Fein's group (coincidentally also called Absinthe Blind) and Tristan Wraight and Seth Fein's The Dr. Johanson Band. Dr. Johanson Band bassist Mike Zolfo was then asked to join the group. As the Champaign-Urbana music scene gained national attention, due to groups such as Hum and Poster Children, Absinthe Blind, along with three other groups, formed a collective entitled Toast Music. The brothers' younger sister, Erin Fein joined the band during the recording of Music for Security while she continued to study sociology and political science at the University of Illinois. In support of Music For Security, the band embarked on a national tour, performing at The CMJ Music Marathon along the way. For their fourth album, The Everyday Separation, the band signed to Mud Records, distributed by Parasol. Zolfo left the group in 2002 to attend music school, and was replaced by Brett Sanderson. The group released one more album, Rings, in 2003, before Adam Fein announced that he was leaving the band. A farewell tour followed, culminating with a hometown show at the Canopy Club in Urbana, Illinois on September 13, 2003.

The four remaining members of the band originally planned to continue recording and touring as Absinthe Blind, but instead formed Orphans, who would later change their name to Headlights. Adam Fein now writes with Hum's Jeff Dimpsey in a band called Gazelle. After the dissolution of Headlights, Erin Fein formed the band Psychic Twin with Sanderson. Following the break-down of her marriage, Erin Fein moved to Brooklyn, New York. In 2016 she signed with Polyvinyl and released the album Strange Diary in September. It was preceded by the single "Hopeless".

== Discography ==
Albums

- When Our Flashes Sway (Hammerhead, 1997)
- Solarshift (Hammerhead, 1998)
- Music For Security (Hammerhead, 2000)
- The Everyday Separation (Mud, 2001)
- Rings (Mud, 2003)
- Winning Is Our Business and Business Is Good (rarities collection) (2004)

=== Singles and EPs ===
- Image (1999)
- Live to Forget (self-released, 2000)
- 6.28.01 live (self-released, 2001)
- The Separation B-Sides (self-released, 2002)
- 9.13.03 live (self-released, 2006)

=== Compilations ===
- Stuck in the Chimney (More Christmas Singles) (contributed "Silent Night") (Parasol, 2000)
- Parasol's Sweet Sixteen, Volume 4 (contributed "Antarctica") (Parasol, 2001)
- Small, My Table: Innocent Words (contributed "The Night You Came Home") (Innocent Words, 2002)
- Parasol's Sweet Sixteen, Volume 6 (contributed "Shields") (Parasol, 2003)
- Parasol's Sweet Sixteen, Volume 7 (contributed "The Break (It's Been There All This Time)") (Parasol, 2003)
- Soak Your Shoes In Red Wine & Strike The Angels Dumb (contributed "The Truth That Paints Your Eyes") (Grand Theft Autumn, 2003)
- openingbands.comp (A Snapshot of Champaign-Urbana: 2003) (contributed "The Break (It's Been There All This Time)") (OpeningBands, 2003)

=== Film and television ===
- Cold Case, The Road. (2008) Contributed "Bands 2" from Rings
- Speakeasy, Project Greenlight Season 2. (2002) Contributed "Bands 1" from Rings
