= Savoy, Illinois =

- Village
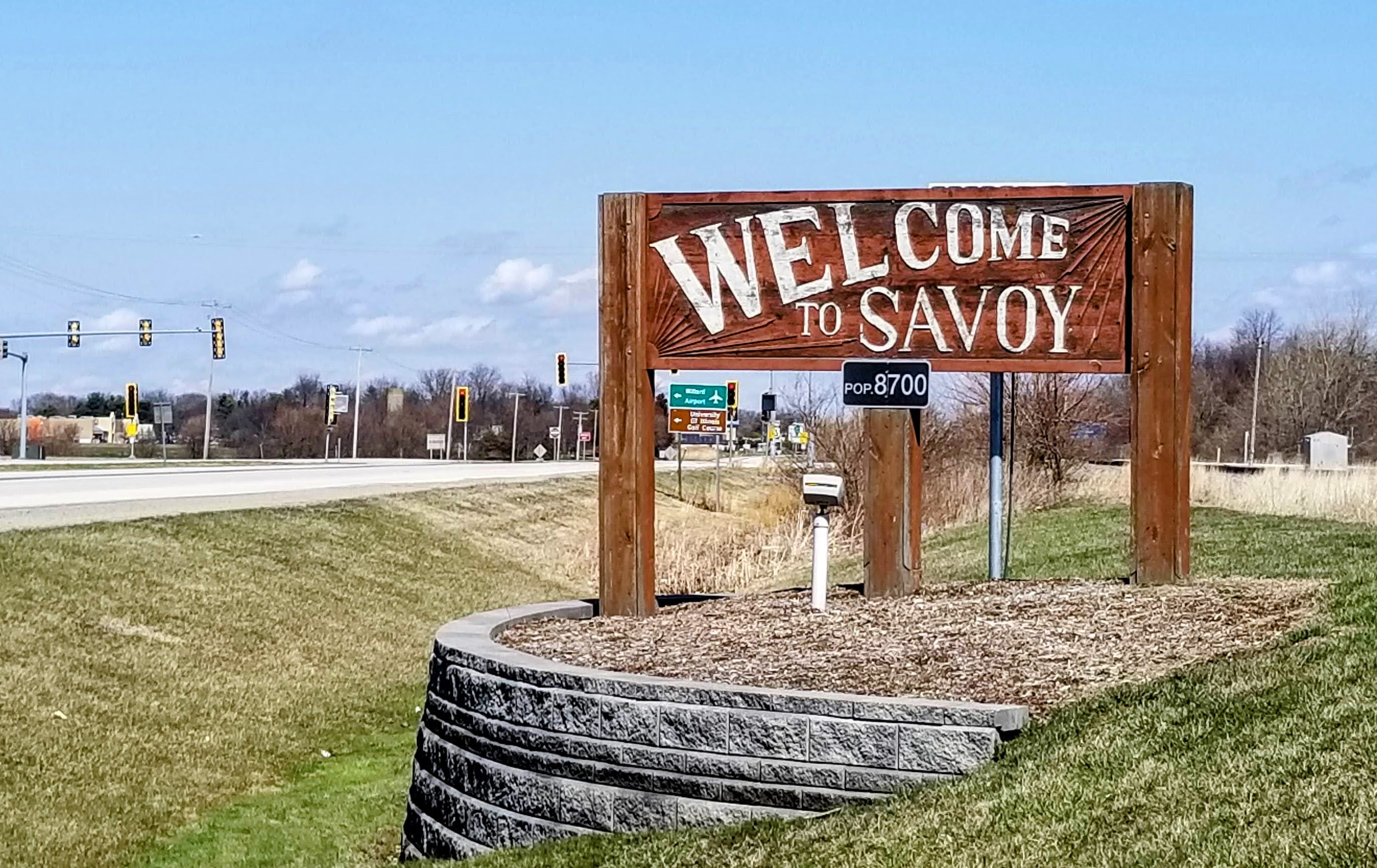
- Savoy welcome sign

- Location of Savoy in Champaign County, Illinois.

- Location within Champaign County Savoy (Illinois)
- Coordinates: 40°03′31″N 88°15′06″W
- Country: United States
- State: Illinois
- County: Champaign
- Named for: Princess Maria Clotilde of Savoy

Area
  - Total: 3.31 sq mi (8.56 km^{2})
  - Land: 3.23 sq mi (8.37 km^{2})
  - Water: 0.069 sq mi (0.18 km^{2})
- Elevation: 745 ft (227 m)

Population (2020)
  - Total: 8,857
  - Density: 2,739.4/sq mi (1,057.69/km^{2})
- Time zone: UTC-6 (CST)
  - Summer (DST): UTC-5 (CDT)
- ZIP code: 61874
- Area code: 217
- FIPS code: 17-67860
- GNIS feature ID: 2399765
- Website: www.savoy.illinois.gov

Savoy is a village in Champaign County, Illinois, United States. The population was 8,857 at the 2020 census. It is part of the Champaign–Urbana metropolitan area.

== History ==
The village was named after Princess Maria Clotilde of Savoy, who had paid the area a visit in 1861. Legend suggests that Maria may have made this visit while on a train in her tour. The village was incorporated on April 10, 1956.

Henry M. Dunlap (1853–1938), Illinois farmer and state legislator, lived in Savoy.

=== Underground Railroad ===
In 1857, Mathias Dunlap opened his house as a depot for African Americans to hide in during their escape in the Underground Railroad. This was located in what now is Burwash Park.

== Geography ==
According to the 2021 census gazetteer files, Savoy has a total area of 3.30 square miles (8.55 km^{2}), of which 3.23 square miles (8.37 km^{2}) (or 97.85%) is land and 0.07 square miles (0.18 km^{2}) (or 2.15%) is water.

Savoy shares a border with the neighboring city of Champaign and is less than two miles from the site of the main campus of the University of Illinois. Savoy is a part of the Champaign–Urbana metropolitan area.

== Demographics ==
Historical population
Census	Pop.	Note	%±
1960	339		—
1970	592		74.6%
1980	2,126		259.1%
1990	2,674		25.8%
2000	4,476		67.4%
2010	7,280		62.6%
2020	8,857		21.7%
U.S. Decennial Census

=== 2020 census ===
As of the 2020 census, Savoy had a population of 8,857. The population density was 2,680.69 inhabitants per square mile (1,035.02/km^{2}). There were 3,986 housing units at an average density of 1,206.42 per square mile (465.80/km^{2}).

The median age was 36.2 years. 21.7% of residents were under the age of 18 and 18.7% of residents were 65 years of age or older. For every 100 females there were 87.6 males, and for every 100 females age 18 and over there were 84.4 males age 18 and over.

100.0% of residents lived in urban areas, while 0.0% lived in rural areas.

There were 3,689 households in Savoy, of which 29.5% had children under the age of 18 living in them. Of all households, 45.5% were married-couple households, 18.9% were households with a male householder and no spouse or partner present, and 31.0% were households with a female householder and no spouse or partner present. About 35.7% of all households were made up of individuals and 13.6% had someone living alone who was 65 years of age or older.

There were 3,986 housing units, of which 7.5% were vacant. The homeowner vacancy rate was 2.6% and the rental vacancy rate was 9.1%.

Racial composition as of the 2020 census
Race	Number	Percent
White	5,858	66.1%
Black or African American	614	6.9%
American Indian and Alaska Native	12	0.1%
Asian	1,630	18.4%
Native Hawaiian and Other Pacific Islander	1	0.0%
Some other race	137	1.5%
Two or more races	605	6.8%
Hispanic or Latino (of any race)	379	4.3%

=== Income and poverty ===
The median income for a household in the village was $74,189, and the median income for a family was $110,655. Males had a median income of $58,594 versus $32,234 for females. The per capita income for the village was $39,751. About 7.3% of families and 12.8% of the population were below the poverty line, including 10.0% of those under age 18 and 8.6% of those age 65 or over.

== Education ==
It is in the Champaign Community Unit School District 4.

== Transportation ==
The northern part of Savoy and a corridor along Dunlap Avenue are serviced by the Champaign-Urbana Mass Transit District.

U.S. Route 45 (Dunlap Avenue) runs north through Savoy into Champaign, Illinois becoming Neil Street. Savoy is about 2–3 miles east of, but in relative proximity to Interstate 57 with access via Curtis Road at Exit 232 and Monticello Road at Exit 229.

The University of Illinois Willard Airport (KCMI) that serves East Central Illinois, with commercial airline service to Chicago O'Hare Airport and Dallas/Fort Worth provided by American Eagle, is located immediately south of Savoy.
