= WEFT =

Community radio station in Champaign, Illinois

- Champaign, Illinois; United States
- Frequency: 90.1 MHz
- Branding: WEFT Champaign 90.1FM

Programming
- Format: Community radio
- Affiliations: Pacifica Radio Network

Ownership
- Owner: Prairie Air, Inc.

History
- First air date: September 26, 1981
- Call sign meaning: Noun form of weaving

Technical information
- Licensing authority: FCC
- Facility ID: 71419
- Class: B1
- ERP: 10,000 watts
- HAAT: 126 meters (413 ft)
- Transmitter coordinates: 40°10′52.1″N 88°19′3.2″W

Links
- Public license information: Public file; LMS
- Website: weft.org

WEFT (90.1 MHz) is a listener-supported community radio station in Champaign, Illinois, founded in 1981 and owned by Prairie Air, Inc., a not-for-profit corporation. WEFT typically broadcasts 24 hours per day and 7 days per week. It has a wide range of programming, including music from a range of genres, local and nationally produced public affairs programming, live music, spoken word, and more.

== History ==
WEFT had its beginnings in 1975 as community members began work to create a new radio station. In 1980, WEFT began to broadcast on the local cable TV network and acquired studio space at 113 N. Market Street in Champaign. This location is still the WEFT operations base. On September 26, 1981, WEFT went on the air as an FM radio station broadcasting at 90.1 MHz. Initially WEFT was a less–than–1,000–watt station with the transmitter and antenna located atop a nearby hotel. In 1991 WEFT/Prairie Air Inc. purchased the building at 113 N. Market Street and within 9 years paid off the mortgage.

In 1988, WEFT acquired a 10,000–watt transmitter and new broadcast antenna designed for a new transmission site located on a hill northwest of Champaign. WEFT began to broadcast in stereo at this time. This move extended the broadcast coverage area significantly with the signal reaching up to 40 miles (64 km). The 10,000–watt transmitter which had been installed in 1988 was replaced in 2008 after a lightning strike damaged the older tube–type transmitter. The current transmitter is solid state.

In March 2025, the station's transmitting equipment began to malfunction and WEFT lost the ability to broadcast their over the air signal at full power. The staff of volunteers at WEFT have since called in professional broadcast engineers to repair the broken cable. This 300-foot cable runs between the transmitter on the ground and the antenna atop a 300-foot broadcast tower. WEFT has launched a fundraising campaign to raise $25,000 to cover the initial repair cost.

== Broadcast range ==
The FM signal reaches approximately 40 miles (64 km) to the north, west and south and about 20 miles to the east of their transmitter site. The reduced power to the east is required to avoid interference with a neighboring station located in Indiana.

== Affiliations ==
WEFT is a member of the National Federation of Community Broadcasters.

== See also ==
- List of community radio stations in the United States
