= Champaign Park District =

Municipality association maintaining public parks in the city of Champaign, Illinois

Coordinates: 40.099213°N 88.2837°W

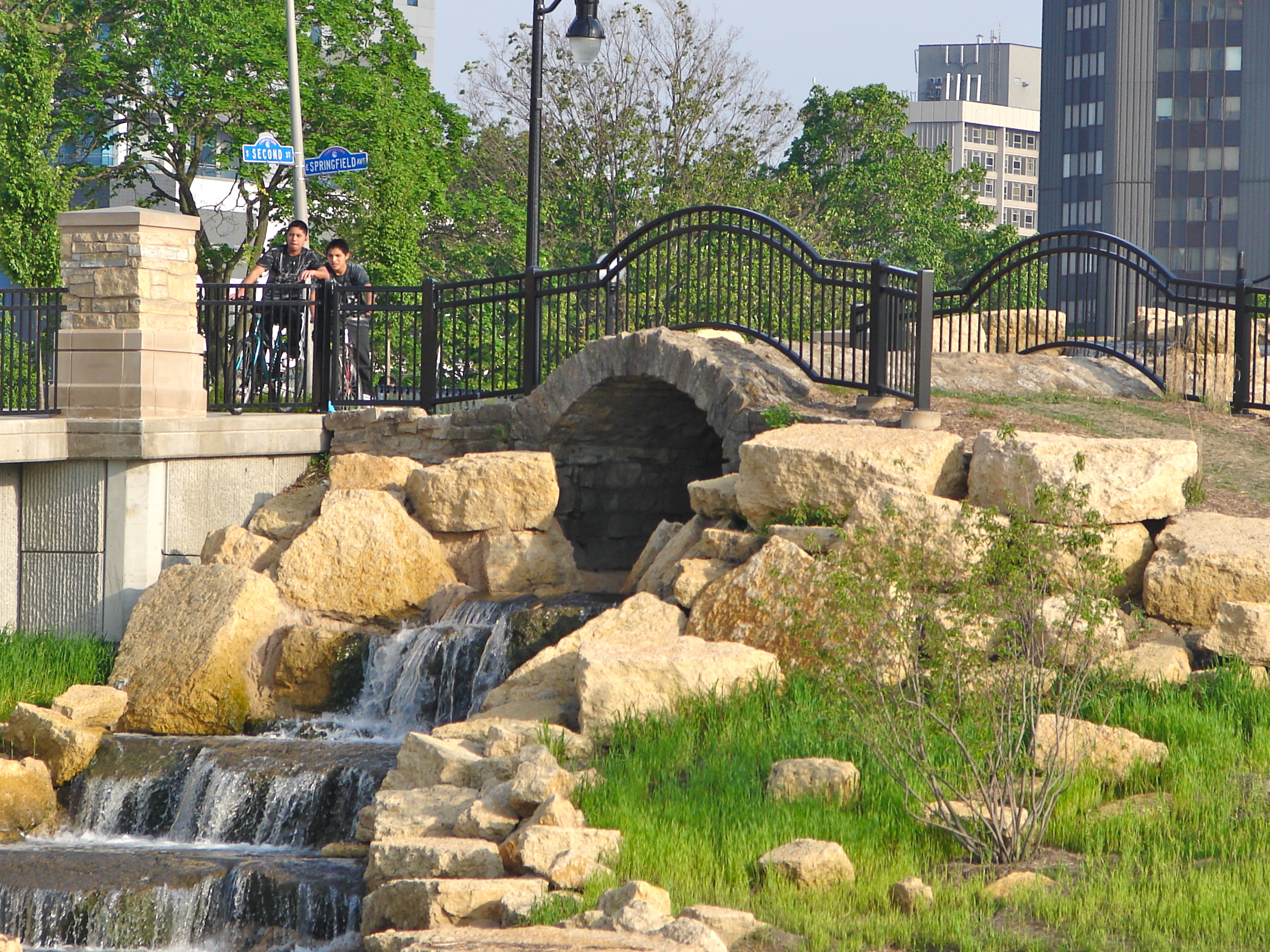
Scott Park, Champaign

The Champaign Park District is the special district responsible for maintenance of public parks in the city of Champaign, Illinois. There are just over 650 acres (2.6 km^{2}) of parkland within the city limits. As of the fiscal year 2011-2012, the park district had an operating budget of almost $11.5 million. Furthermore, the park district employees about 65 full-time staff and over 400 part-time and seasonal workers.

== Notable Parks ==
=== West Side Park ===
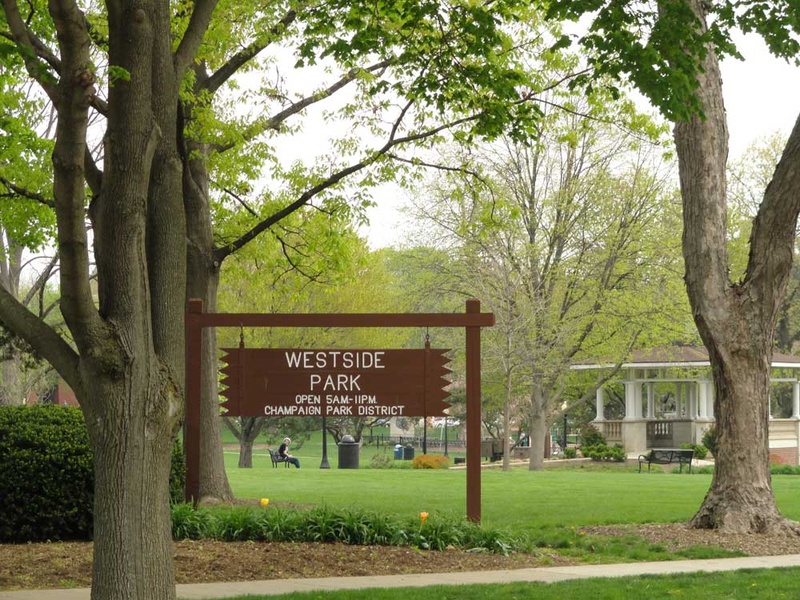
West Side Park

The 12.5 acres (51,000 m^{2}) West Side Park is located in downtown Champaign, blocks away from the busy streets and within full view of City Hall. Originally zoned for the city square and future county courthouse (which was later sited in Urbana), it became in 1859 the first park in the system. Known as the commons when it was first created, it was in 1861 designated as a public cow pasture where any citizen might graze their cow for a fee of $0.35 per month.

Benjamin F. Johnson (1818–1894), an executive of the Illinois Central Railroad, donated $10,000 to the city for the building of a statue and bandstand in the commons. Sadly this was not completed until five years after his death. The statue "A Prayer for Rain" was sculpted by Edward Kemeys (1843–1907) and placed atop Johnson fountain. Both were dedicated to the project's benefactor in 1899.

Other notable monuments in what is now known as West Side park include the Lincoln Monolith, and several statues and plaques commemorating the Indian War.

== Minor parks ==
- Hessel Park, 26.9 acres (109,000 m^{2}) of land obtained by the city in 1918, contains a free children's water park run by the city as well as a perimeter path totaling 0.6 miles (0.97 km).
- Eisner Park, sandwiched between Church and University on the city's west side, boasts two age-appropriate playgrounds, ball courts, and a baseball diamond. A rec center building also sits on this property.
