= WRFU-LP =

- Urbana, Illinois; United States
- Broadcast area: Champaign-Urbana
- Frequency: 104.5 MHz
- Branding: Radio Free Urbana

Programming
- Format: Variety

Ownership
- Owner: Urbana-Champaign Independent Media Center Foundation

Technical information
- Licensing authority: FCC
- Facility ID: 126154
- Class: L1
- ERP: 100 watts
- HAAT: 19.7 meters (65 ft)
- Transmitter coordinates: 40°6′41.00″N 88°12′25.00″W

Links
- Public license information: LMS
- Website: wrfu.net

WRFU-LP (104.5 FM, "Radio Free Urbana") is a radio station broadcasting a variety music format. Licensed to Urbana, Illinois, United States, the station serves the Champaign area. The station is currently owned by the Urbana-Champaign Independent Media Center Foundation.
