= Museum of the Grand Prairie =

- Location: 950 North Lombard; Mahomet, Illinois
- Coordinates: 40.2054°N 88.3940°W
- Type: History, natural history
- Website: Official website

The Museum of the Grand Prairie is a museum situated in the Lake of the Woods Forest Preserve in the village of Mahomet, Illinois. The museum is accredited through the American Alliance of Museums (AAM) and has been since 1972. The Museum was formerly known as The Early American Museum but the name was changed to The Museum of the Grand Prairie.

== Mission ==
The museum has a stated mission to collect, preserve and interpret the natural and cultural history of Champaign County and East Central Illinois.

== Permanent exhibits ==
The museum currently has three permanent exhibits. The first, "The Grand Prairie Story", presents the story of the region and the people who have lived here. This exhibit ranges from Native Americans and settlers, to farmers and city folk, to the immigrants who came later along. This exhibit gives a large scale overview of all the different walks of life that have come through the great prairie.

The second permanent exhibit is "Blacksmithing on the Prairie". The blacksmith exhibit is based upon the A.B Chesebro blacksmith shop that was founded in 1896 in Saunemin, Illinois. This family blacksmith shop was shown to the museum staff in 1993. The staff were so into it that they began performing some research into the shop’s history. They collected stories from different relatives and people from around the area and learned that the shop was last owned by A.B.’s son in the 1930s during the Great Depression. The shop was a block and frame shop for wagons at the time. The museum staff proceeded to photograph and categorize all of the objects and the layout of the shop. The museum now is in possession of 5,500 objects from the original shop, some of which can be seen in the exhibit. The shop was recreated partially at the museum and can now be visited to see the different tools and products of the day.

The third permanent exhibit is "Champaign County’s Lincoln", which shows the way the county would have looked when Abraham Lincoln was in the area at the beginning of his political career. The first part of the exhibit is the buggy to show what kind of transportation would have been used at the time. It then progresses through a tavern, photo studio, and an area church with recordings on issues that would have been prevalent at the time.
