= Gies Memorial Stadium =

Home stadium of the Illinois Fighting Illini. Champaign, Illinois

- Zuppke Field

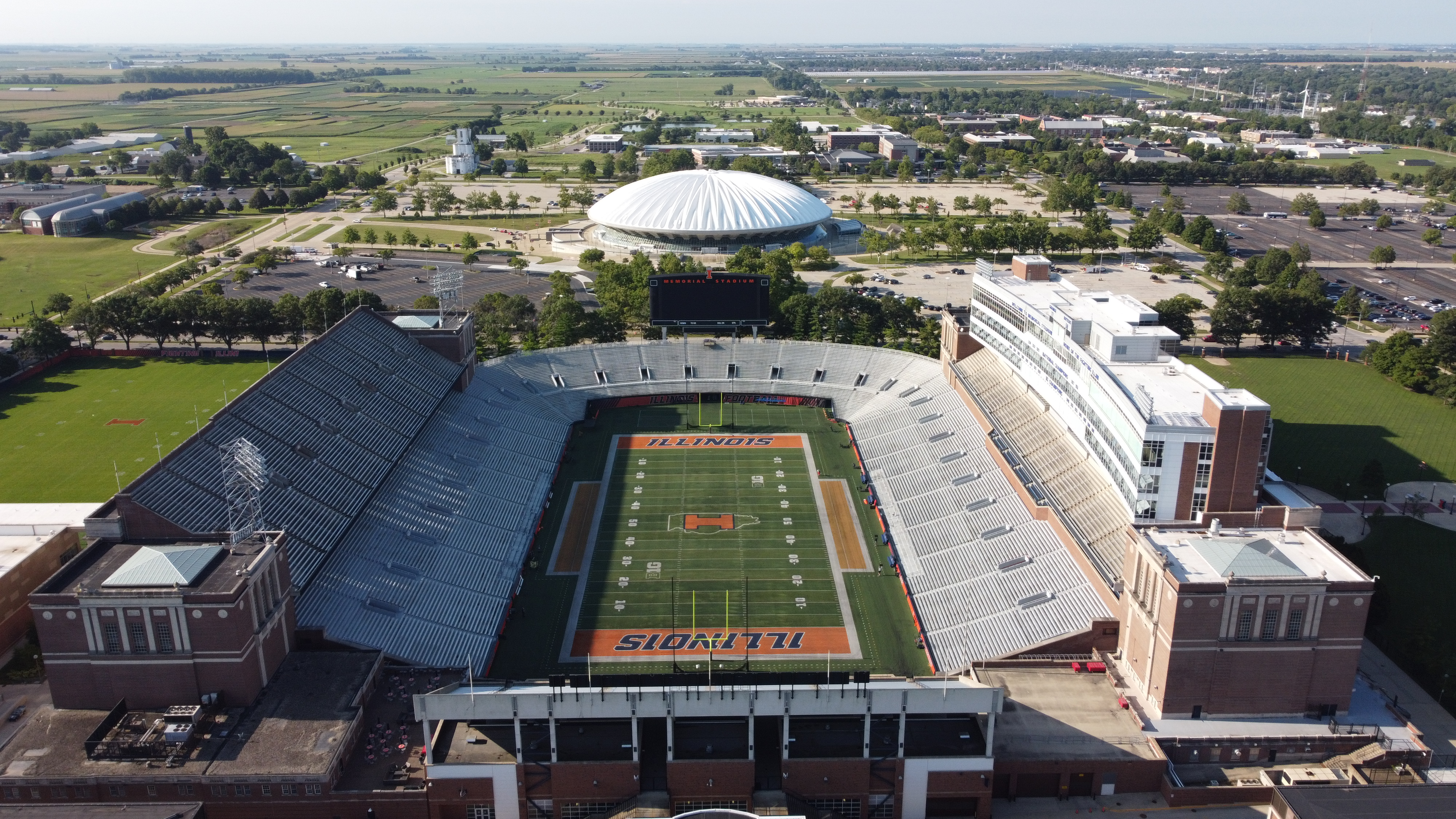
- Aerial view of Memorial Stadium in 2021
- Interactive map of Gies Memorial Stadium
- Full name: University of Illinois Gies Memorial Stadium
- Address: 1402 South 1st Street
- Location: Champaign, Illinois
- Coordinates: 40°5′57″N 88°14′9″W
- Owner: University of Illinois
- Operator: University of Illinois
- Capacity: 60,670 (2011–present) Former capacity: List: 62,870 (2008–2010); 57,078 (2007); 69,249 (2002–2006); 70,904 (1992–2001); 70,053 (1991); 69,200 (1988–1990); 70,153 (1987); 70,563 (1984–1986); 70,906 (1983); 71,227 (1964–1982); 71,119 (1930–1963); 55,524 (1923–1929)
- Surface: Grass (1923–1974); AstroTurf (1975–2000); AstroPlay (2001–2007); FieldTurf (2008–present)
- Public transit: MTD

Construction
- Groundbreaking: September 11, 1922
- Opened: November 3, 1923
- Renovated: 1985, 2008, 2013
- Expanded: 1930
- Cost: US$1,700,000 ($32.1 million in 2025 dollars)
- Architects: Holabird & Roche (original); HNTB (renovation)
- General contractor: English Brothers

Tenants
- Illinois Fighting Illini (NCAA) (1923–present); Chicago Bears (NFL) (2002)

Website
- fightingillini.com/memorial-stadium

Gies Memorial Stadium is a stadium on the campus of the University of Illinois Urbana-Champaign in Champaign, Illinois, United States. The stadium, used primarily for football, is a memorial to the university's students who died in World War I; their names are engraved on the nearly 200 pillars surrounding the stadium's façade. With a capacity of 60,670, the stadium is primarily used as the home of the university's Fighting Illini football team.

The stadium was known as simply Memorial Stadium (as a memorial to those students who died in World War I) until September 9, 2025, when it was named after Larry Gies Sr., a U.S. Army veteran and the late father of alumnus philanthropist Larry Gies, following a $100 million donation from Gies to the university's Division of Intercollegiate Athletics.

== Construction ==
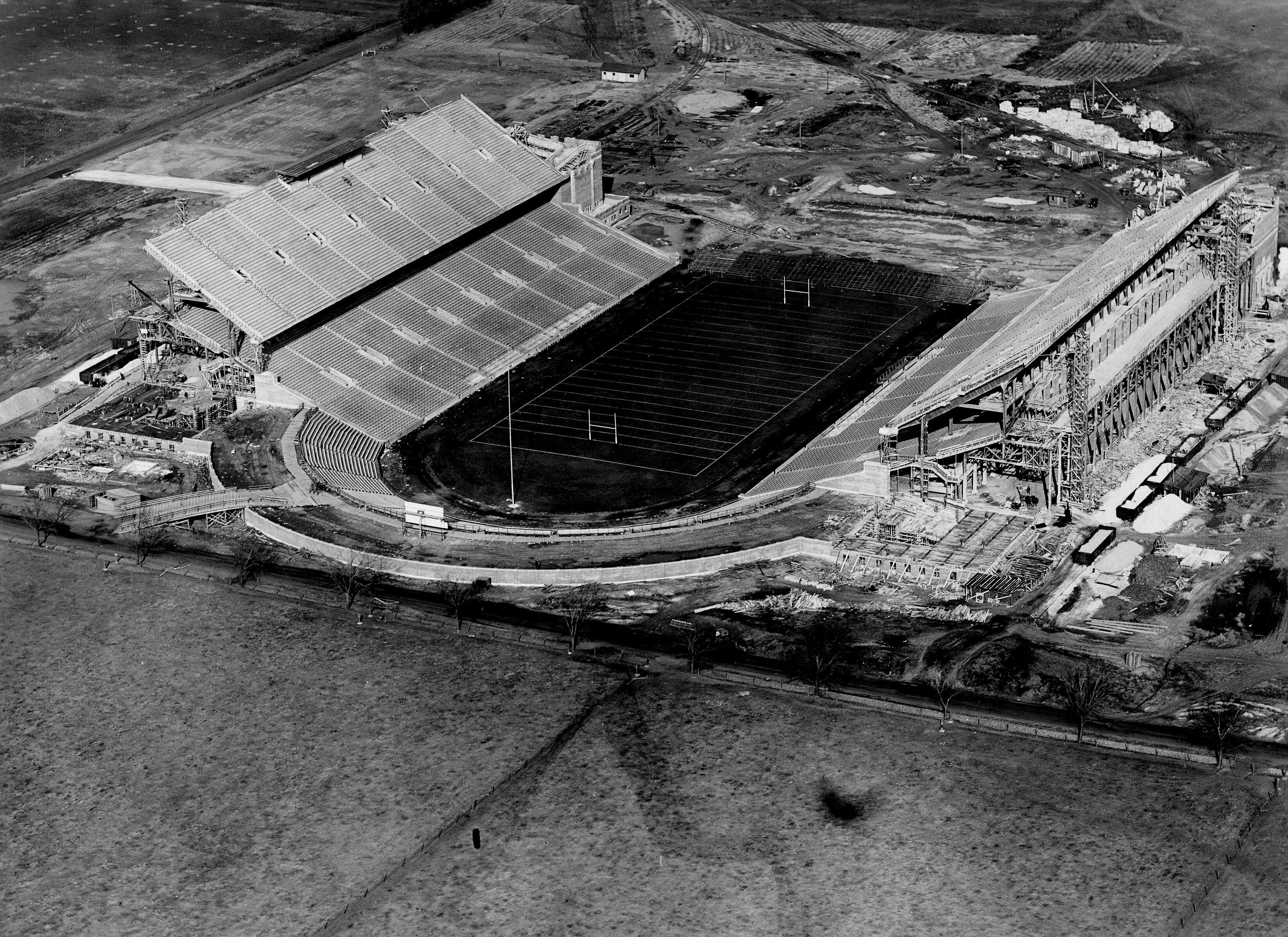
Construction, 1923

In the early 1920s, the old football stadium, Illinois Field, was deemed inadequate. There was some sentiment for retaining the site, but it was too congested to expand the stadium adequately, so a new site was selected, in a largely undeveloped area at the south end of the campus. George Huff and Robert Zuppke were responsible for pushing most of the fundraising for this project.

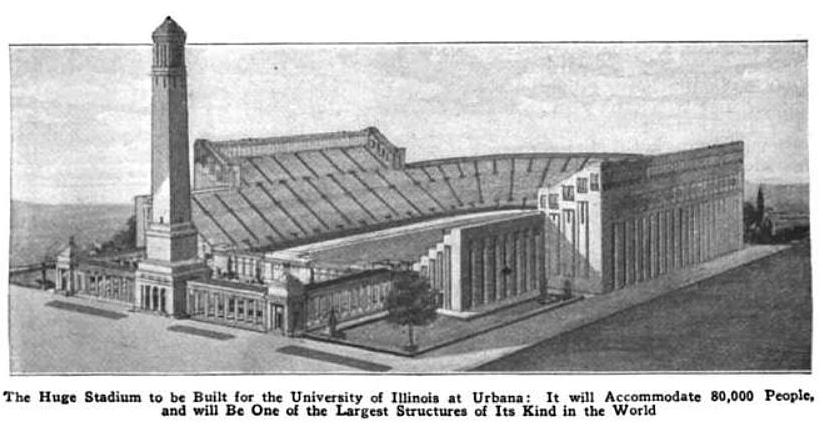
Original plan for Memorial Stadium as seen in Popular Mechanics magazine, 1921

Memorial Stadium was completed in 1923 at a cost of US$1.7 million, which, adjusted for inflation, is equal to $25.8 million in 2020. Its original U-shaped design borrows some form from the earlier constructed Harvard Stadium. The project's general contractor was English Brothers of Champaign, who are in business to this day. The name was chosen in honor of the dead from World War I. The original construction was financed with donations from University students, alumni and others. At the time, the stadium consisted of double-decked stands on the east and west sidelines. The single-decked horseshoe around the south end zone was later completed, along with a large student section near the north end zone.

According to an archival "campus tours" website, heavy rain during the construction resulted in a bulldozer sinking into the field. It was decided the expense of removing the bulldozer would have been greater than leaving it buried under the field, and it remains there today. However, this has since been disputed as a campus urban legend. Oddly enough, the same myth exists for the University of Michigan Stadium built a few years later, but no evidence has been found to support the rumor.

The bell of the USS Illinois (BB-65), an Iowa-class battleship that was never completed, is on loan to the university and is in use. It is traditionally rung when the Fighting Illini score a touchdown or goal during home games.

== Dedication ==
The stadium is dedicated to the men of the University of Illinois that gave their lives serving in World War I. In 2002, the stadium dedication was extended to those who died in World War II. There are a total of 200 columns on the east and west sides of the stadium. 183 columns display one name of a University of Illinois alum that lost their lives in the first war (182 men and 1 woman).

The stadium was officially dedicated on October 18, 1924, on which the university football team played a homecoming game against the University of Michigan. On way to a 39–14 Illini victory, Red Grange scored five touchdowns in one of the greatest single-game performances in football history.

== Tributes ==
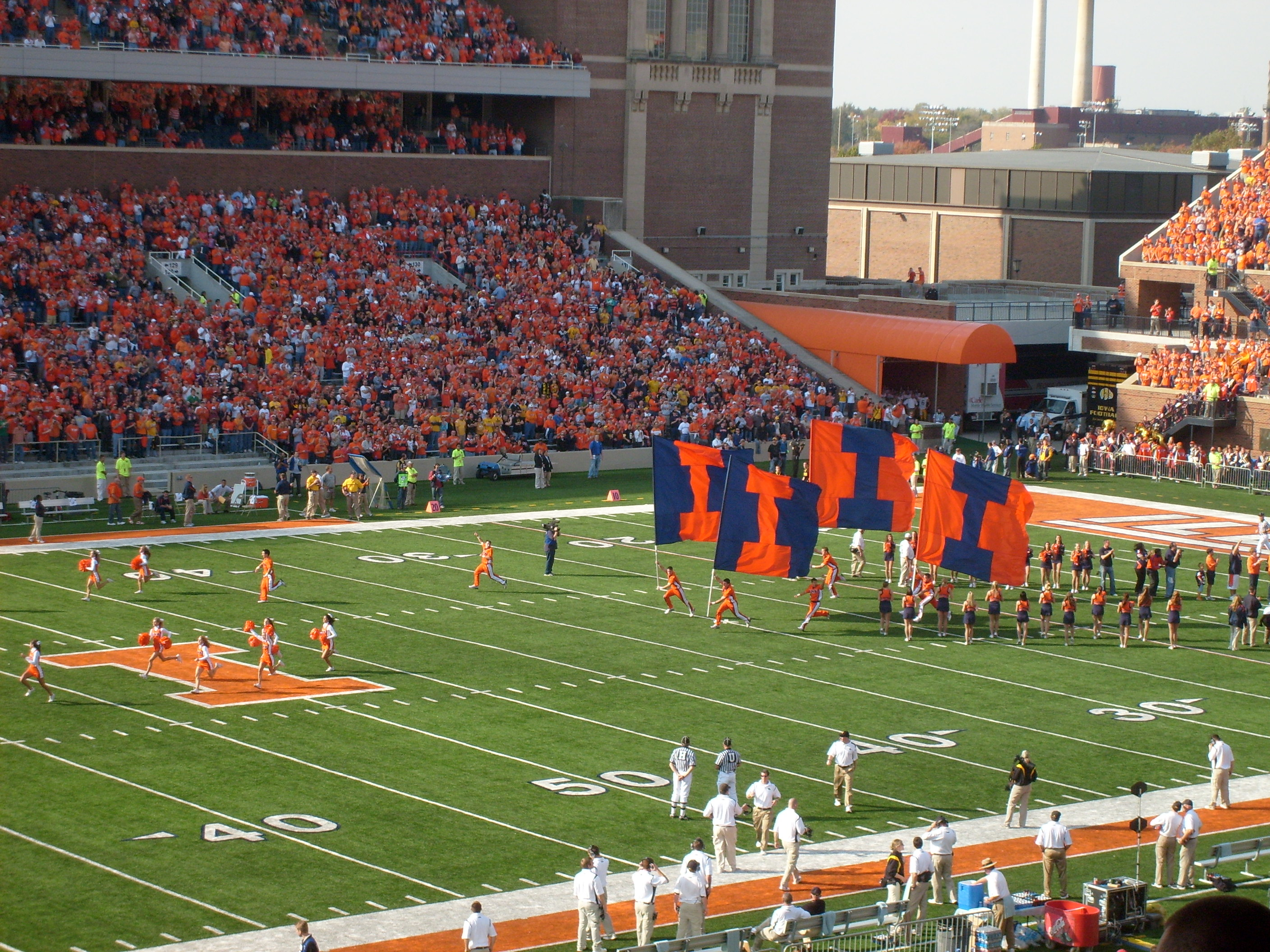
Memorial Stadium during Illinois' game against Iowa in 2008.

- The football playing surface within the stadium is named Zuppke Field, in honor of Robert Zuppke, the University of Illinois head football coach from 1913 to 1941.
- The north end of Zuppke Field hosts The Grange Rock, a tribute to Red Grange. The tribute was dedicated on October 22, 1994, with Mrs. Margaret Grange, Red Grange's wife, in attendance. The rock came from the same Indiana quarry that produced the stadium's columns.
- In 2009, a 12-foot (3.7 m) statue of Red Grange was dedicated as the capstone of the stadium's "Illinois Renaissance" renovations.
- The Ray Eliot Varsity Room is named for Ray Eliot, the University of Illinois head football coach from 1942 to 1959.

== Capacity ==
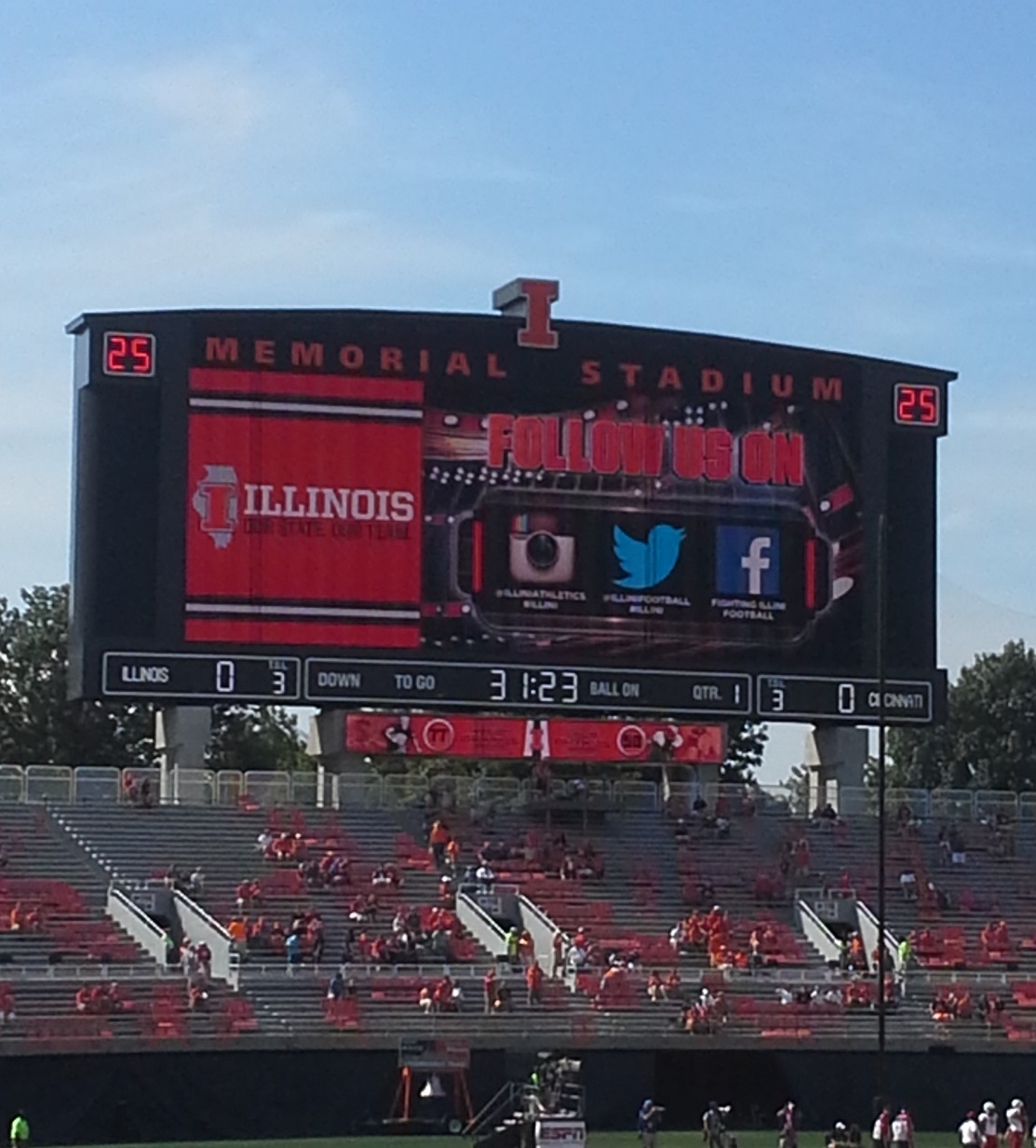
Scoreboard above the South Horseshoe in 2013

The seating capacity of the stadium's permanent seating, including the north end zone bleachers, is 60,670. This number was reduced from 62,870 when it was announced on April 12, 2011 that 2,200 south end zone bleacher seats added in 1982 would be removed. The 62,870 number had been reduced from 69,249 as part of the Illinois Renaissance program which was completed in 2008. The east main holds approximately 18,000 with the east balcony adding 10,000. The west main holds less than 13,000 on the first level plus 5,000 in the balcony. The south end zone "horseshoe" holds nearly 9,800 (12,000 before the removal of the aforementioned 2,200 seats), while the north bleachers add 5,000 more seats.

=== Attendance records at Memorial Stadium ===
Attendance	Opponent	Year	Result
78,297	Missouri	1984	30–24
76,428	Wisconsin	1984	22–6
76,397	Michigan	1985	3–3
76,395	Wisconsin	1985	38–25
76,369	USC	1985	10–20
76,343	Ohio State	1985	31–28
76,330	Southern Illinois	1985	28–25
76,127	Michigan	1983	16–6
76,101	Purdue	1984	34–20
76,056	Minnesota	1984	48–3

=== Average attendance since 2001 ===
Year	Avg Attendance	Change	Record
2024	54,750	+10%	10–3
2023	49,698	+16%	5–7
2022	43,048	+22%	8–5
2021	35,347	-3%	5–7
2020	N/A	N/A	2–6
2019	36,587	+1%	6–7
2018	36,151	-8%	4–8
2017	39,429	-14%	2–10
2016	45,644	+7%	3–9
2015	42,647	+3%	5–7
2014	41,549	-5%	6–7
2013	43,787	-4%	4–8
2012	45,564	-8%	2–10
2011	49,548	-9%	7–6
2010	54,188	-9%	7–6
2009	59,544	-4%	3–9
2008	61,707	+12%	5–7
2007	54,872	+26%	9–4
2006	43,445	-9%	2–10
2005	47,852	-2%	2–10
2004	48,626	-5%	3–8
2003	50,961	-8%	1–11
2002	55,199	0%	5–7
2001	54,949	N/A	10–2
Total	45,214	-36%	104–155

== Past renovations ==
- A press box was built at the top of the west balcony in 1967.
- As part of the 1974 Golden Anniversary campaign, artificial turf was installed on the field, along with a new lighting system.
- A $7 million renovation began in April 1985. New AstroTurf was installed, along with new football headquarters in the northeast corner of the stadium.
- From November 1991 to August 1992, an $18 million renovation project replaced all concrete bleachers in both the east and west upper decks, along with the top 25 rows of the main stands. New restrooms were built, and the stadium's electrical and drainage systems were upgraded to meet new building codes.
- A color scoreboard was added to the north end of the stadium for the 1994 season.
- The stadium's AstroTurf was replaced with AstroPlay in 2001.
- In the summer of 2022, the stadium was given a new turf field.

=== 2008 "Illinois Renaissance" renovation ===
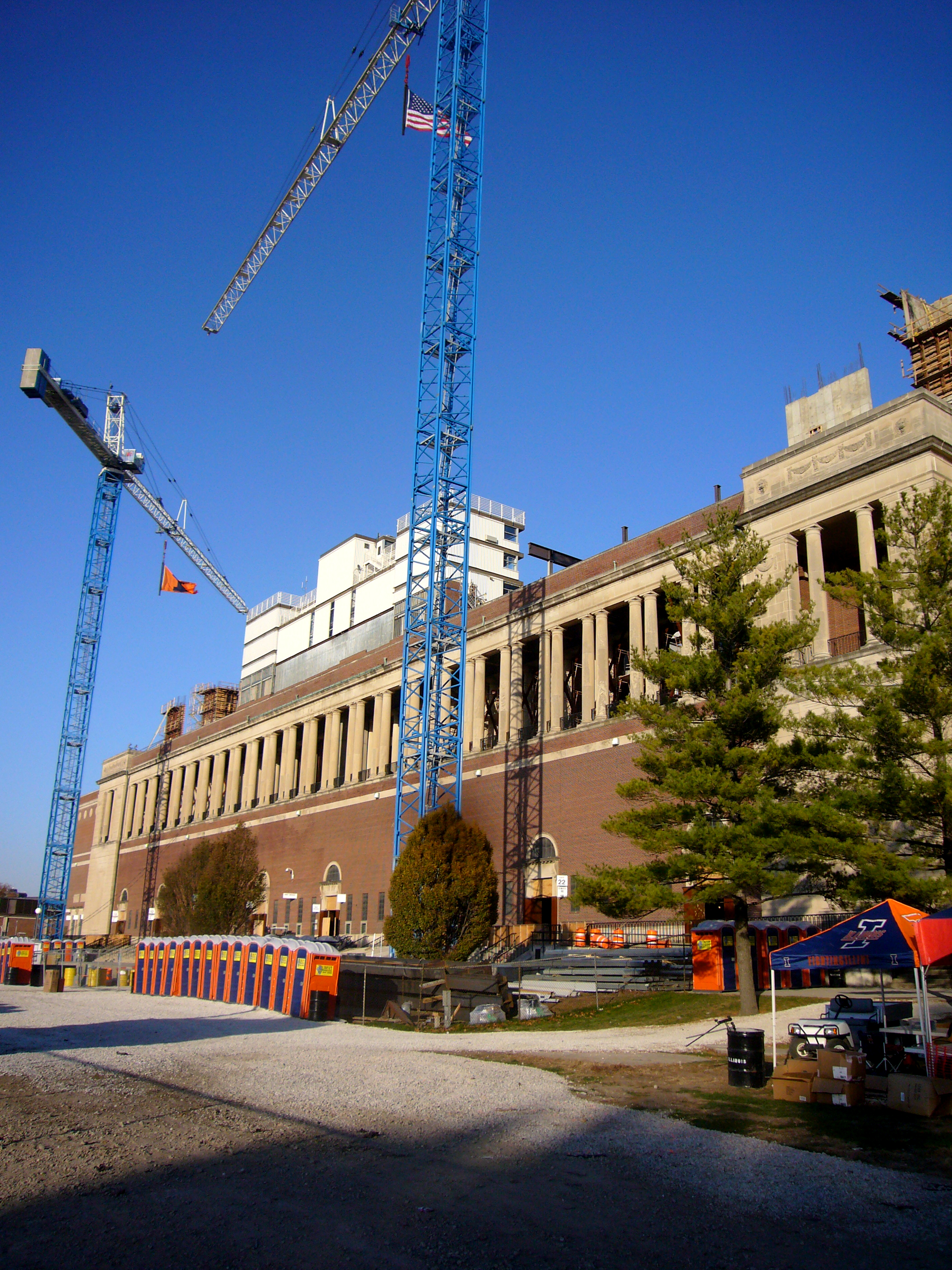
Memorial Stadium under renovation (2007)

A massive renovation project was unveiled for Memorial Stadium in the fall of 2005. The "Illinois Renaissance" project began after the completion of the 2006 football season, and was completed just days before the 2008 season began. The concourse areas on all four sides of the stadium were improved with better concession and restroom facilities. Additionally, the concourse areas were connected all the way around the stadium for easier passage between the east and west stands. A permanent, 5,000-seat structure was built on the north end of the stadium, and the existing scoreboard and video replay screen was moved to the south end zone. The south horseshoe was planned to be filled in down to field level, and would have completely connected the east and west stands. The horseshoe improvements, which were not implemented, would have increased seating to 14,000 seats behind the south end zone. The capacity of the west stands will be significantly reduced in order to build a large press box and luxury suite area at the top of the balcony. The new boxes will be three levels tall and will extend the entire length of the field. The new capacity of the stadium after the renovation will be 62,143. This $100 million project will be largely paid for by sales of the stadium's new suites and luxury seating in the west stands. The field also got a new FieldTurf playing surface.

Controversy has arisen over the decision to move the bulk of the student section to the north side of the stadium. Some student overflow seating is set aside on the north end of the east stands. The location may hamper the view of the student section when the ball is at the south end of the field. Critics of the plan suggest this is a move to sell the seats currently occupied by the student section at a higher price to the general public. The planners assert that they are trying to make the field noise louder and cater to the student's needs by giving them separate concessions and amenities.

The renovated stadium was rededicated at the 2008 season home opener against Eastern Illinois University on September 6, 2008.

=== 2013 renovation ===
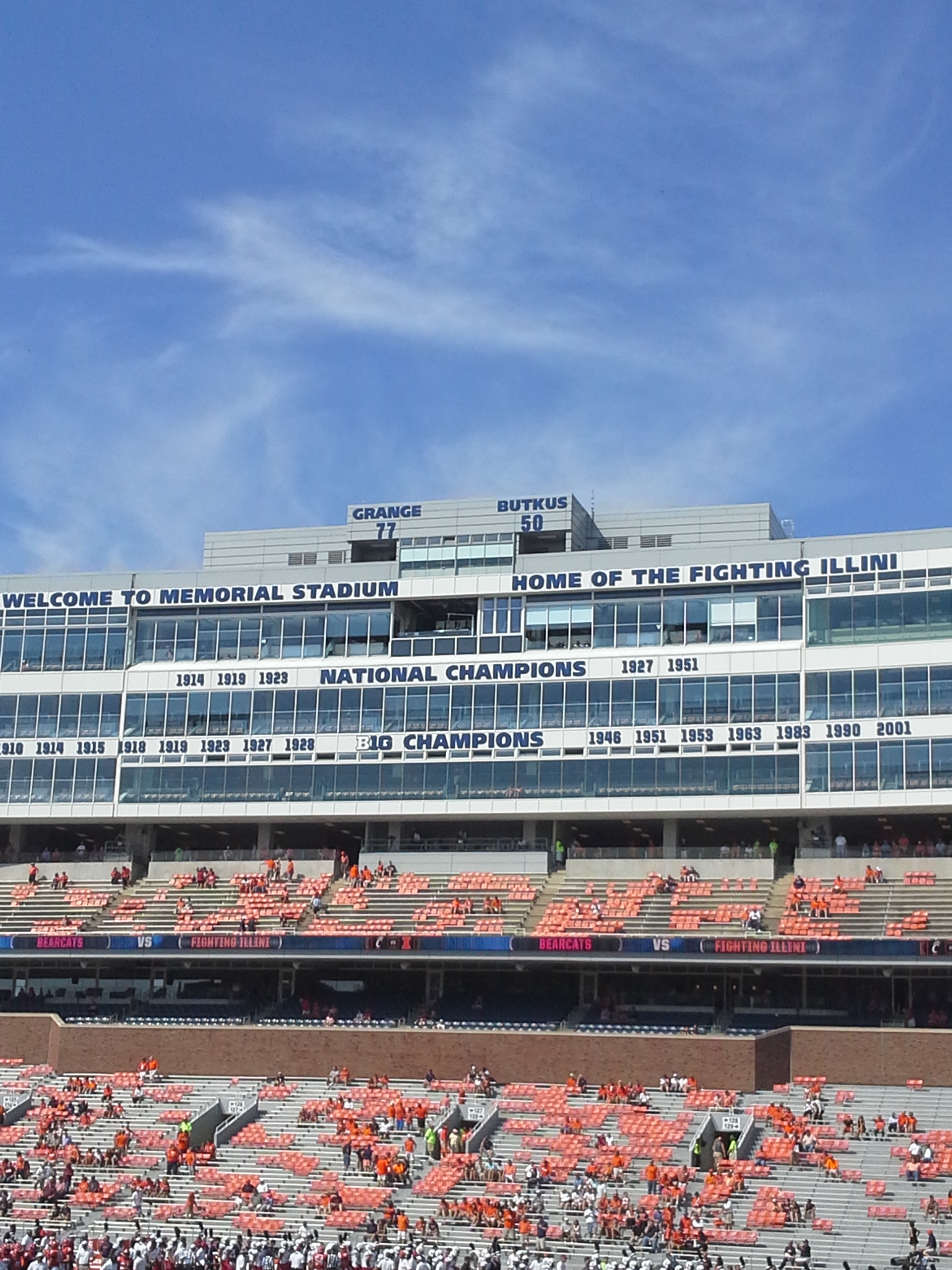
View of the new lettering and one of two new ribbon video boards at Memorial Stadium

For the start of the 2013 Fighting Illini season, the athletic department replaced the main scoreboard with a new Daktronics video board that measures 36 by 96 feet (11 by 29 m). Additionally, the stadium's sound system was updated and two 420-foot-long (130 m) ribbon video boards were installed along the façade between the upper and lower decks of the stadium's sideline seating.

To recognize the Illinois Fighting Illini football's historical accomplishments, the athletic department also installed new lettering along the outside of the luxury suites and press box. The lettering lists National Championships, Big Ten Championships, Retired Numbers, and also reads Welcome to Memorial Stadium Home of the Fighting Illini.

=== 2020s incremental renovations ===
On June 25, 2022, Athletic Director Josh Whitman stated during his annual Media Roundtable Press Conference that he plans to further renovate Memorial Stadium in the near future. Whitman stated, "Obviously, the East and South of Memorial Stadium is something that needs attention. In my perfect world, I always wanted to unveil a fully renovated Memorial Stadium in time for the 100th anniversary of its dedication in 2024. At this point, I don't know how likely that is. As we transition into Phase 2, it will be a function of talking through the priorities. Sometimes those priorities are driven in part by donor interest and donor appetite. It happens often where a certain gift materializes and it moves a project from No. 3 to No. 1. That happens all the time."

The following year, Whitman disclosed that renovations were being completed incrementally, with $8 million spent over the past three years. Renovations included new flooring, repainting, and updating bathroom facilities, among other improvements. Whitman also stated that he was targeting a renovation package between $25–30 million that would upgrade the stadium's technology, such as the sound system and Wi-Fi.

=== 2026 Video Display ===
In 2026, Daktronics manufactured and installed the largest video screen in college football. The display totals 17,315 square feet.

== Other uses ==
- Memorial Stadium was the site of the 1977 and 1979 NCAA Men's Division I Outdoor Track and Field Championships
- From December 1985 until the spring of 2000, an inflatable practice dome known as "The Bubble" was inflated over the field, to allow for indoor practice during the winter months. "The Bubble" was replaced by the Irwin Indoor Football Practice Facility in 2001 which is just northeast of the stadium.
- "The Bubble" was also used by the Chicago Bears in 1985 while practicing for Super Bowl XX.
- On September 22, 1985, it hosted the first ever Farm Aid concert.
- It is the site of the field show of the annual Illini Marching Band Festival, hosted by the Marching Illini and usually the largest high school marching band competition in Illinois.
- Since 1999, it has hosted the IHSA football state finals. In 2023 Illinois State University will become the permanent host for the IHSA state football championships after the Memorial Stadium and Northern Illinois University in Dekalb have alternated hosting the event for the past ten years.
- In 2002, the stadium also hosted the NFL's Chicago Bears while Soldier Field was being renovated. The Bears' founder and former Illini Football player George Halas would use his alma mater's orange and blue to also represent the professional team's colors.
- Since the Illinois Marathon's creation in 2009, Memorial Stadium has served as its finish line, which is held the fourth weekend each April.
- It is home to the annual Illinois Sights and Sounds welcome event for incoming freshman and transfer students. This is complemented by the campus-wide commencement ceremony that celebrates graduates.

== Gallery ==
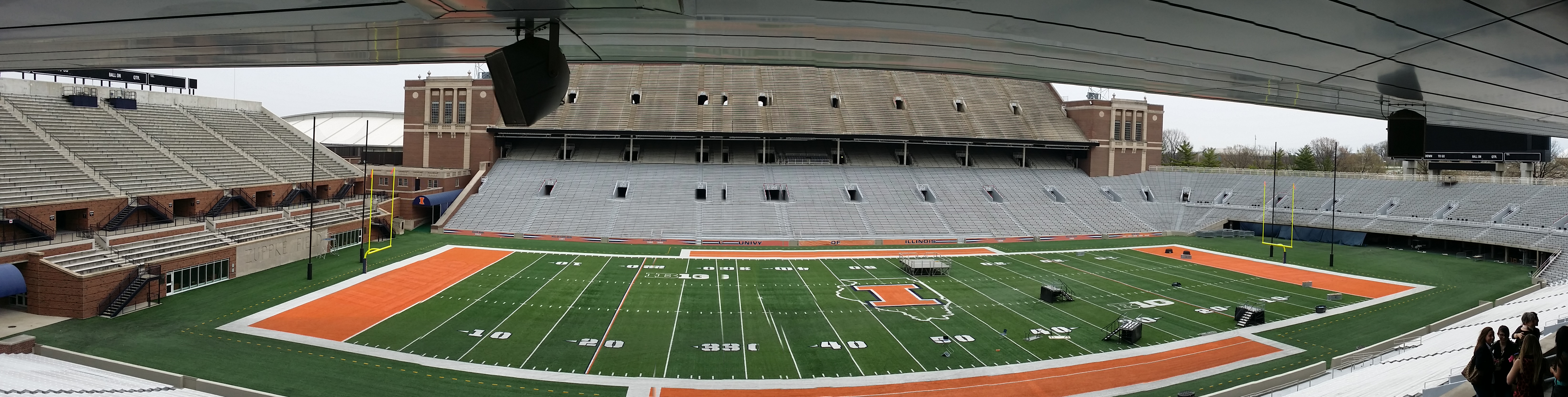
A panorama facing east from the Colonnades Club at Memorial Stadium

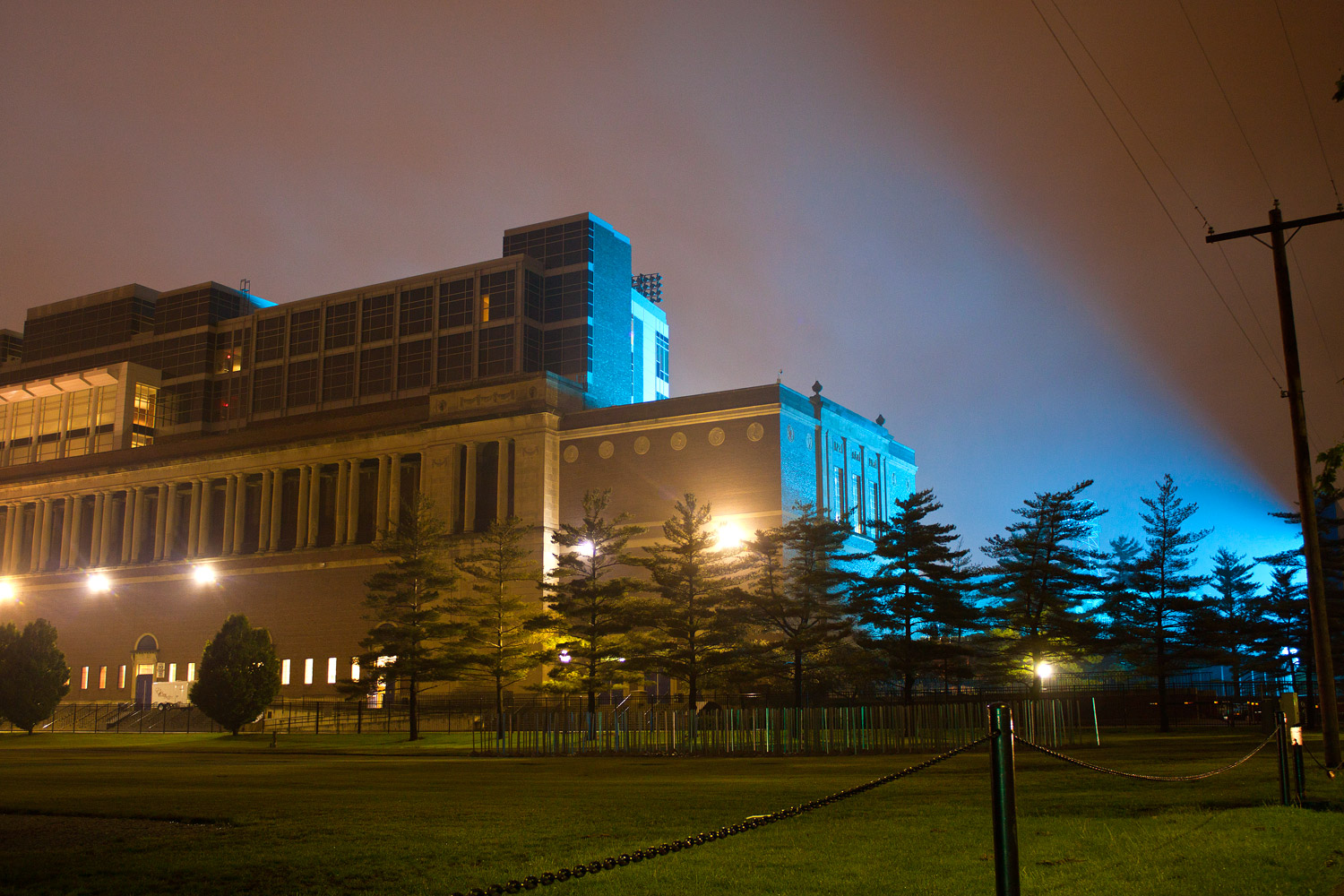
East facing view of Memorial Stadium at night.

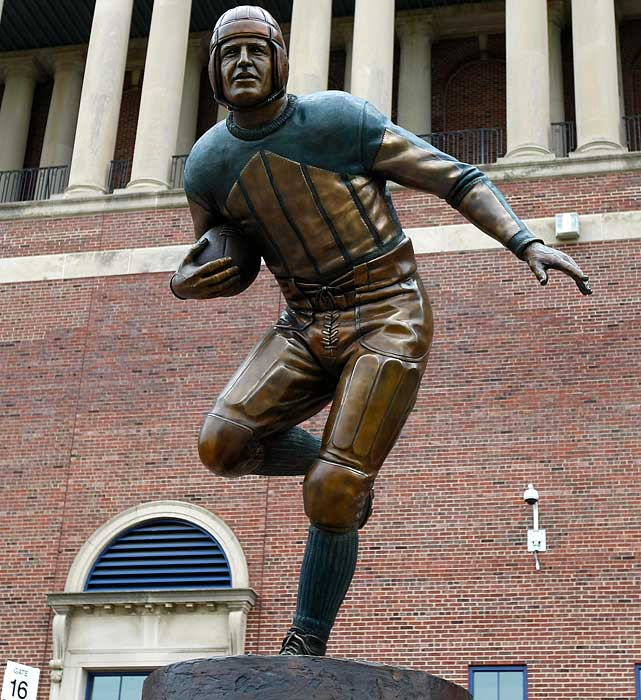
Statue of Red Grange by George Lundeen outside Memorial Stadium

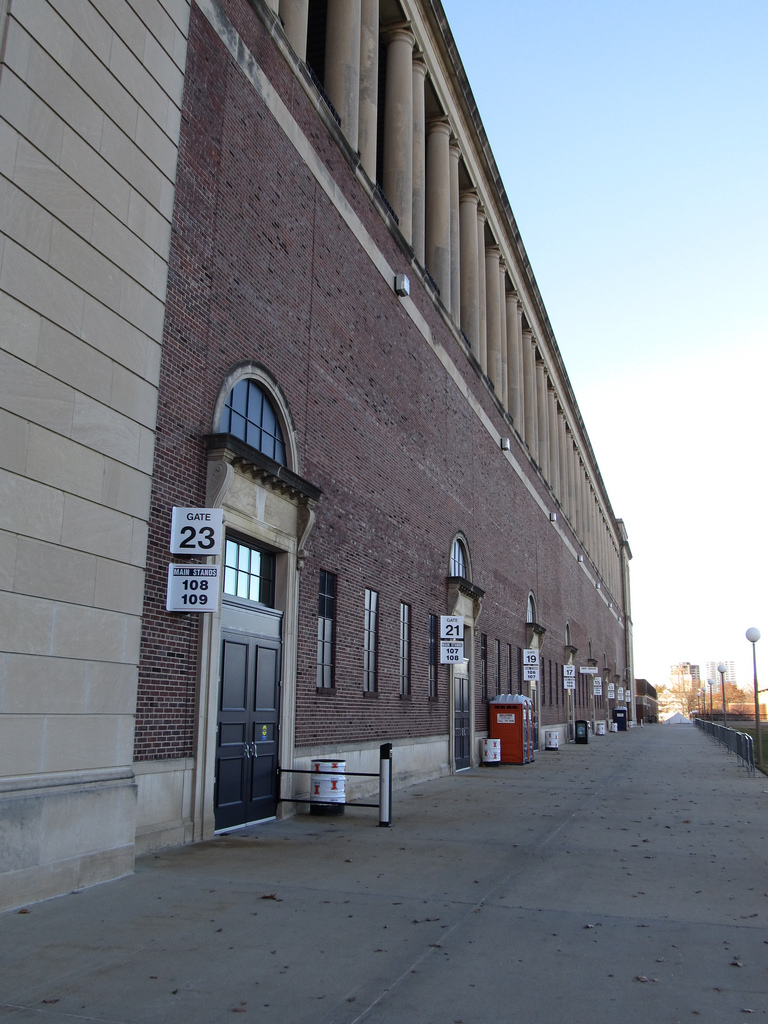
East Exterior

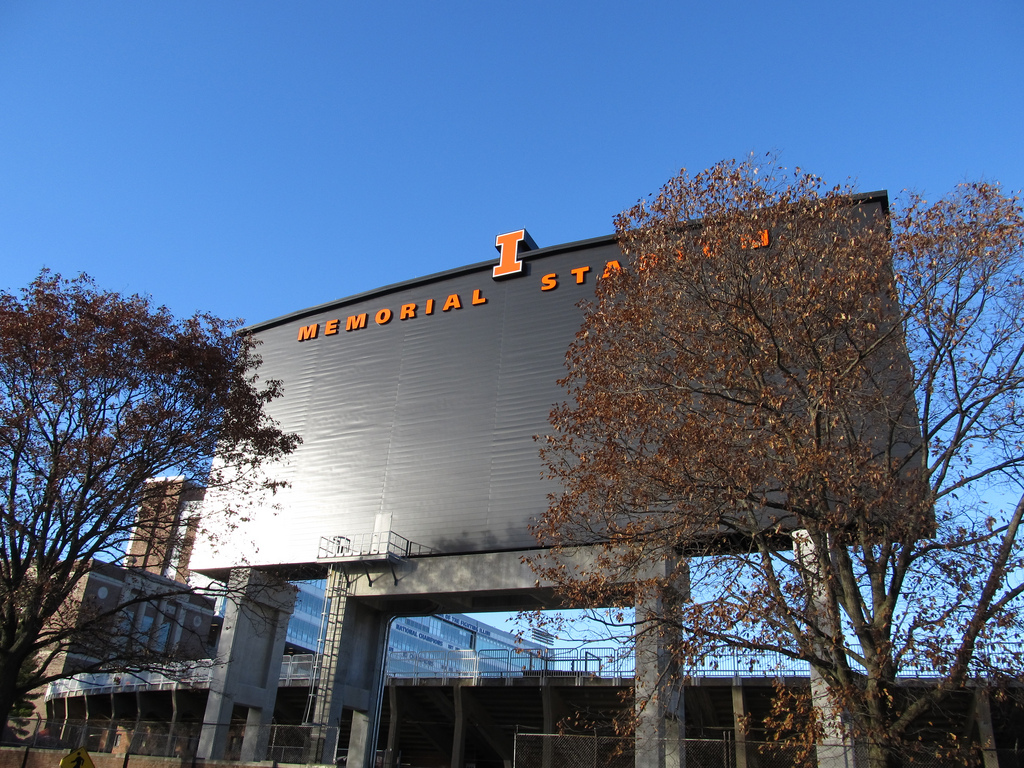
Jumbotron

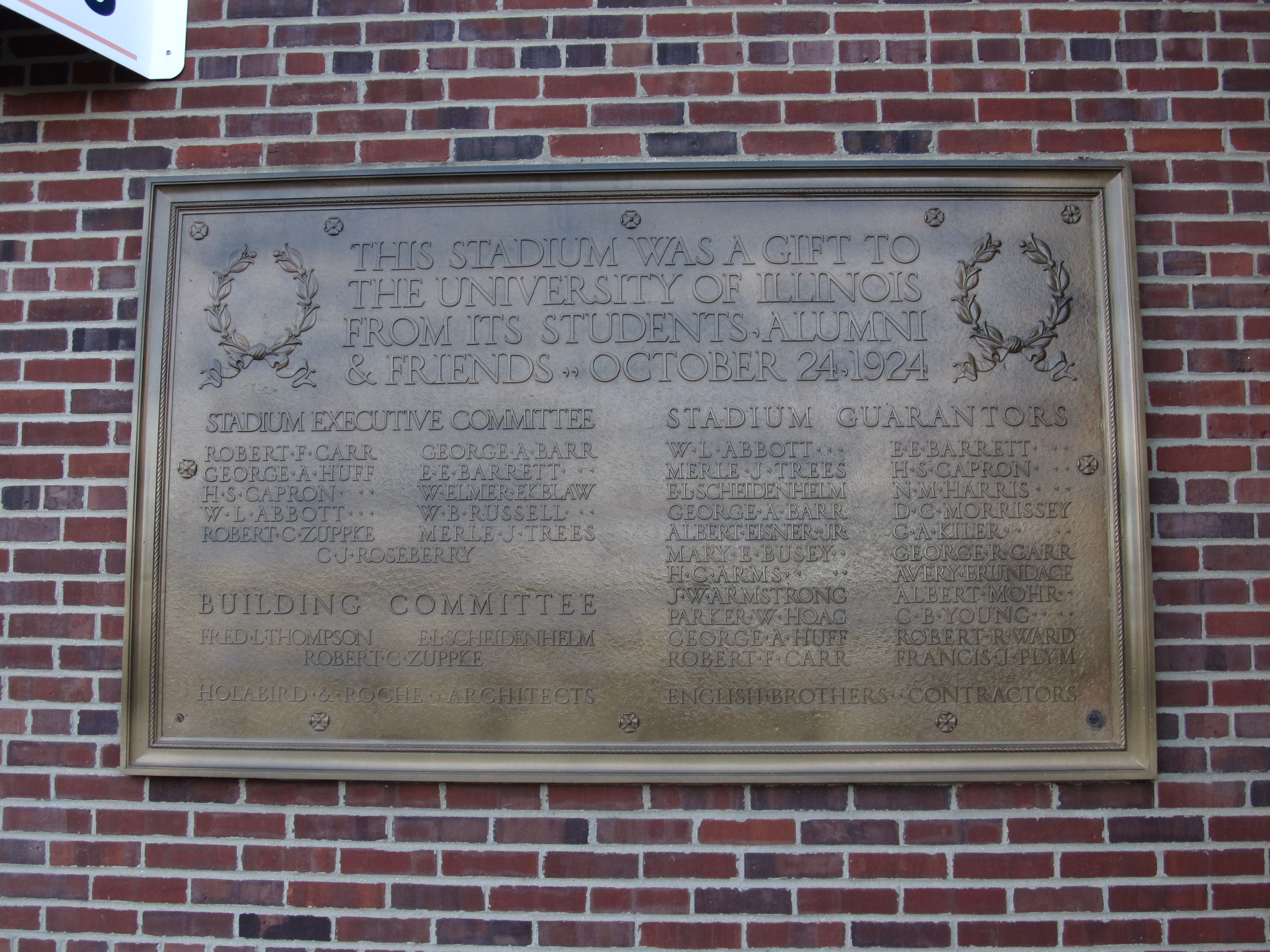
Dedication plaque outside Memorial Stadium

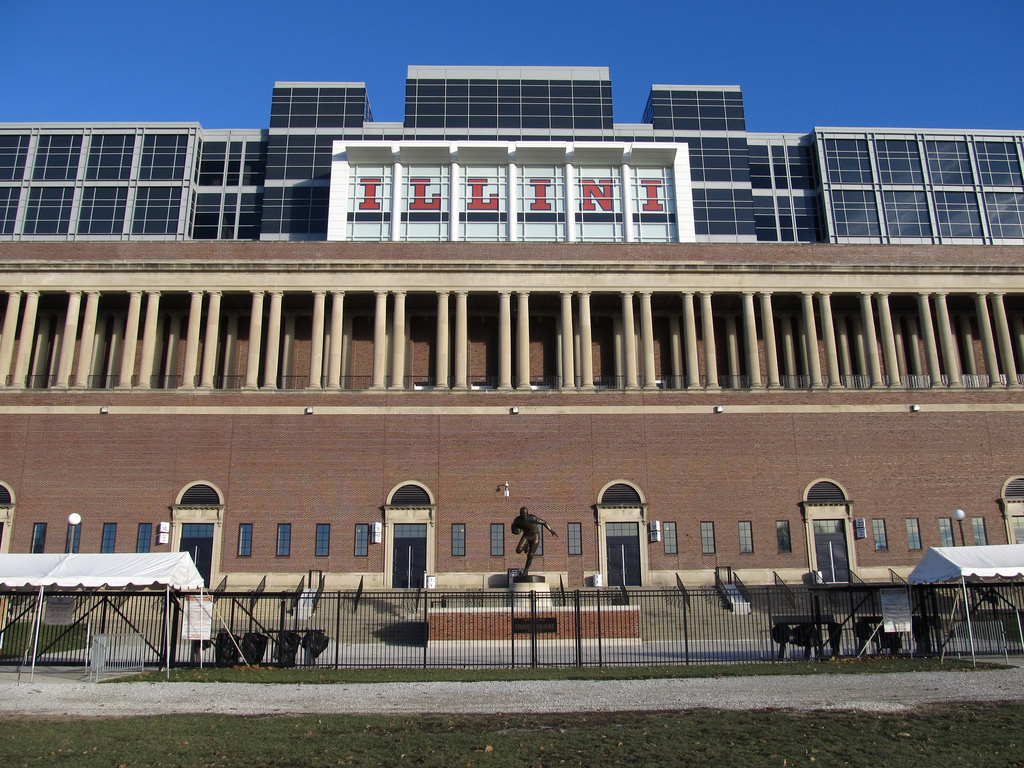
West Exterior

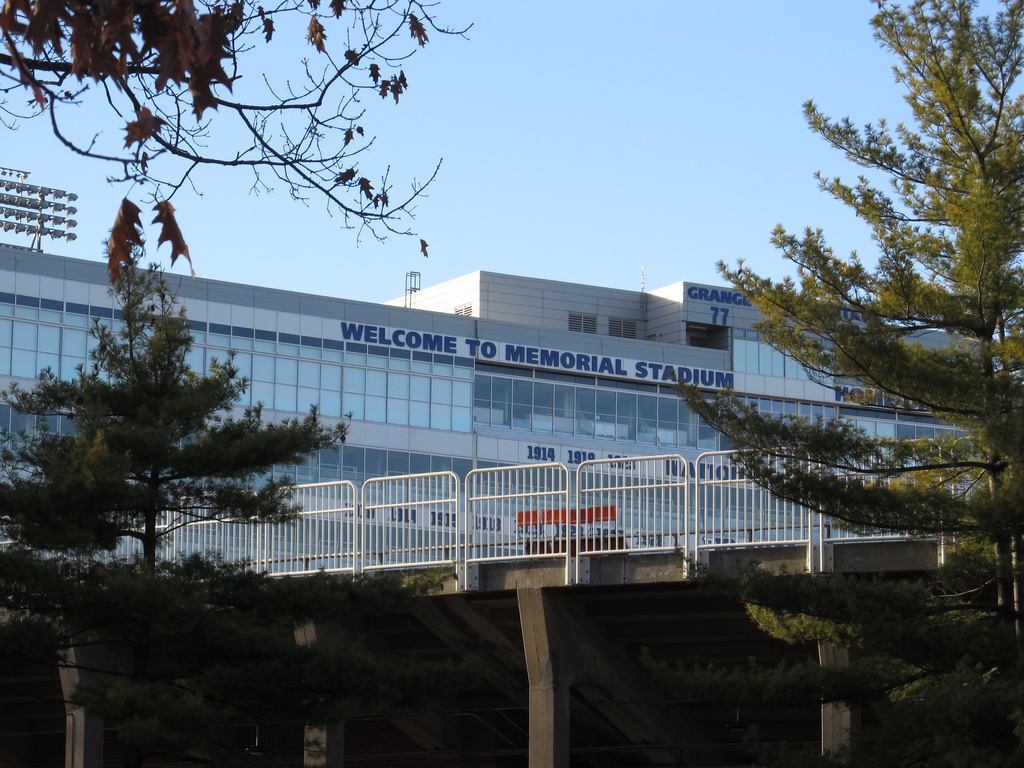
Premium Suites

== See also ==
- List of NCAA Division I FBS football stadiums
- List of American football stadiums by capacity
- Lists of stadiums
