= Pygmalion Music Festival =

The Pygmalion Festival
- Genre: Indie rock, Folk, Hip hop, Electronica
- Dates: September
- Locations: Champaign-Urbana, Illinois, United States
- Years active: 2005–present
- Website: thisispygmalion.com

The Pygmalion Festival, known also as PYGMALION, is a multi-day festival named for the Slowdive album of the same name, which takes place in Champaign-Urbana, Illinois, United States every September, started by Seth Fein and Justine Bursoni. Shows run concurrently at multiple venues, in the style of SXSW. Local bands are showcased along with national touring acts such as Of Montreal, Man Man, Yo La Tengo, Andrew Bird, Wavves, Black Mountain, Iron & Wine, Dan Deacon, and Okkervil River. It has expanded in scope each year since its inception, and received coverage on sites such as Pitchfork Media, Daytrotter, and Tiny Mix Tapes.

== 2005 ==
In its inaugural year, Pygmalion Music Festival took place from September 28-October 1 at Canopy Club, Cowboy Monkey, The Highdive, Illini Union Courtyard Cafe, The Iron Post, and Mike N Molly's.

Lineup
The Like Young, The City on Film, Owen, Mates of State, Ida, Saturday Looks Good to Me, Maserati, Headlights, The M's, Catfish Haven, Chin Up Chin Up, The Appleseed Cast, Mike Ingram, Bailey, Elanors, The Chemicals, The Living Blue, Tractor Kings, Low Skies, The Invisible, Emotional Rec Club, Green Light Go, Unique Chique, fireflies, Al*iteration, MC Harsh, Agent Mos, Ro Knew, Elsinore, The Championship, Triple Whip, Lorenzo Goetz, Pulsar47, Ambitious Pie Party, Angie Heaton, Megan Johns, Lynn O'Brien, Kate Hathaway, Troubled Hubble, Apollo Project, The Winter Blanket, The Beauty Shop, JigGsaw, Mike Downey, Ear Doctor, Thollem McDonas, Jason Finkelman's Nu-Orbit Ensemble

== 2006 ==
The 2006 Pygmalion Music festival ran from September 20–23rd at the Canopy Club, Cowboy Monkey, The Highdive, The Iron Post, Krannert Center, and Mike N Molly's.

Lineup
Elf Power, Murder by Death, Margot & the Nuclear So and So's, Danielson, David Bazan, Man Man, The Life and Times, Of Montreal, Headlights, Owen, Someone Still Loves You Boris Yeltsin, Unwed Sailor, Salaryman, Cory Chisel and The Wandering Sons, Geoff Reacher, Mad Science Fair, Dress Code, Shipwreck, Low Skies, Metal Hearts, Scurvine, Triple Whip, Ghost in Light, Exit Clov, Coco Coca, Darrin Drda, Canada, The Living Blue, Watery Domestic, The Beauty Shop, Brighton MA, Caleb Engstrom, New Ruins, Howling Hex, Elsinore, Gentleman Auction House, Darling Disarm, The City on Film, The Reputation, Monte Carlos, fireflies, Bailey, Lorenzo Goetz, Probably Vampires, Weird Weeds, Pulsar47, Tractor Kings, Rusty Pipes, Bellcaster, Elanors, Judah Johnson, Ellestel

== 2007 ==
The 2007 Pygmalion Music festival ran from September 19–22nd at the Canopy Club, Cowboy Monkey, The Highdive, Illini Union Courtyard Cafe, Krannert Center, Mike N Molly's, and Soma Ultralounge.

Lineup (headliners in bold)
Andrew Bird, Okkervil River, Questlove (DJ set), Casiotone for the Painfully Alone, Owen, Catfish Haven, Margot & the Nuclear So and So's, Maserati, Dianogah, Denison Witmer, Headlights, Shapes and Sizes, Sybris, Liz Janes, The Foundry Field Recordings, Angie Heaton, Awesome Car Funmaker, Baby Teeth, Bound Stems, Caleb Engstrom, Canada, Casados, Coco Coca, Cory Chisel and the Wandering Sons, Damien Jurado, Dark Meat, Darling Disarm, Death Ships, Dignan, Early Day Miners, Elsinore, Hypno-Music-Corp, Inspector Owl, Jane Boxall, Jumbling Towers, Hathaways, Kristov's Agenda, Krukid, Larry Gates, Le Loup, Lucky Mullholland, Lynn O'Brien, Marla Hansen, Mit'n, Ms. Led, New Ruins, Noah Harris, Oceans, Odawas, Probably Vampires, Pulsar47, Robots Counterfeiting Money, Roses and Sake, Royal Electric, Ryan Groff, Sangamon, Shipwreck, Skybox, Terminus Victor, The Beauty Shop, The Chemicals, The Living Blue, Tractor Kings, This is Me Smiling, Triple Whip, Tunnels, Two Girls, Unwed Sailor, Via Audio, Wax on Radio, Yeasayer

== 2008 ==
The 2008 Pygmalion Music festival ran from September 17–20 at Blues BBQ, Canopy Club, Exile on Main St., Illini Union Courtyard Cafe, Jennifer North, Krannert Art Museum, Krannert Center, Mike N Molly's, and Red Herring.

Lineup (headliners in bold)
Yo La Tengo, Black Mountain, Dan Deacon, High Places, Times New Viking, Asobi Seksu, Thao & the Get Down Stay Down, Headlights, The Hood Internet, Centaur, Dark Meat, Evangelicals, Jesse Sykes and the Sweet Hereafter, Titus Andronicus, Decibully, The M's, Murder by Death, Owen, Oxford Collapse, Pattern Is Movement, Grampall Jookabox, Monotonix, Catfish Haven, PWRFL Power, Agent Mos, Angie Heaton, Animate Objects, Atlatl, Beaujolais, Brian Esmao, The Brother Whys, Butterfly Assassins, Caleb Engstrom, Carl Hauck, Casados, Checkerboard Stalemate, Coco Coca, Common Loon, Dr Manhattan, Elsinore, Eureka Sky, Everthus the Deadbeats, Final Pygmalion Effect, The Forms, The Foundry Field Recordings, Gentleman Auction House, Girls Next Door, Good Night and Good Morning, Hathaways, Jared Bartman, Jonathon Childers, Kid You'll Move Mountains, Krukid, The Living Blue, Loaded, The Lonelyhearts, Lucky Mulholland, Michael Kammin, Mute Era, New Ruins, The Number One Sons, Oceans, Peter Piek, Pontiak, Post-Historic, Robots Counterfeiting Money, Rod & Martha Stewart, The Ruckus, Sangamon, Santa, Snowsera, Sunset Stallion, Tall Tale, Tractor Kings, Treologic, Underpaid Packy, World's First Flying Machine, Wye Oak, Zmick

== 2009 ==
The 2009 Pygmalion Music Festival ran from September 16–19 at Bentley's Pub, Blues BBQ, Canopy Club, Channing-Murray Foundation, Cowboy Monkey, The Highdive, Krannert Art Museum, Krannert Center, Mike N Molly's, Parasol Records Store, Red Herring, and Sandella's. Two of the four members of local legends Hum performed (Tim Lash with Alpha Mile and Jeff Dimpsey with Gazelle).

Lineup (headliners in bold)
Iron & Wine, Lucero, RJD2, Ra Ra Riot, Wavves, Low, The Books, Headlights, The Antlers, Autolux, YACHT, Japandroids, Margot & the Nuclear So and So's, Maps & Atlases, Owen, Maserati, The Hood Internet, BLK JKS, My Brightest Diamond, The 1900s, Starfucker, The Life and Times, Mt. St. Helens Vietnam Band, Bob Nanna, William Fitzsimmons, Skream, Gazelle, Denison Witmer, Company of Thieves, Joe Pug, Pomegranates, Decibully, Jookabox, Brooke Waggoner, The Horse's Ha, So Many Dynamos, Alpha Mile, DJ Belly, Brighton, MA, Butterfly Assassins, Cameron McGill, Common Loon, DJ CZO, The Curses, The Daredevil Christopher Wright, Deelay Ceelay, Drew Danburry, Duke of Uke, Early Day Miners, Elsinore, Empires, DJ Famicom, Final Pygmalion Effect, Ganglians, Gentleman Auction House, Girls Next Door, Golden Quality, Good Night and Good Morning, Hathaways, The Horns of Happiness, JigGsaw, The Jips, Kilroy, et al., DJ Kosmo, Liesel Booth, Light Pollution, Liz Janes, Lonely Trailer, DJ Lucknow, Lymbyc Systym, Marmoset, Mason Proper, Matt Wagemann, Mazes, DJ Mertz, Mordechai in the Mirror, Morgan Orion and the Constellations, My Dear Alan Andrews, Neoga Blacksmith, New Ruins, Now, Now Every Children, The Number One Sons, Oceans, Ohtis, On Again Off Again, Pamela Machala, Peninsula, Phantogram, Porno Galactica, Princeton, Post Historic, Ryan Groff, Santa, Scurvine, So Long Forgotten, Stan McConnell, SteelEater, Sunset Stallion, Tina Sparkle, Take Care, Tracey and Tricia, Tyson & the Friction, Village, World's First Flying Machine, Withershins, You & Yourn, Zach May & the Maps

== 2010 ==
The 2010 Pygmalion Music Festival ran from September 22–25.

Lineup (headliners in bold)
of Montreal, Built to Spill, Roky Erickson with Okkervil River, Caribou, Ted Leo and the Pharmacists, Janelle Monáe, Cut Chemist, Cap'n Jazz, Surfer Blood, Plastician, Holy Fuck, +/-, Those Darlins, Fang Island, Cults, Owen, Colour Revolt, David Dondero, Candy Claws, Turbo Fruits, Light Pollution, All the Day Holiday, Arkansas Dogjaw, Butterfly Bones, Common Loon, Community College, Darren Hanlon, Deathtram, Dirty Feathers, DJ Belly, DJ Mertz, Drink Up Buttercup, The Duke of Uke and His Novelty Orchestra, Famicom, Elsinore, Grandkids, Jared Bartman, Jimmy Gnecco, Lookbook, New Ruins, Phaded, The Poison Control Center, Pomegranates, Revolt Revolt, Santah, So Long Forgotten, Take Care, Unwed Sailor, The Viper and His Famous Orchestra, Why I Like Robins, Withershins, World's First Flying Machine

== 2011 ==
The 2011 Pygmalion Music Festival ran from September 21–25.

Lineup (headliners in bold)
Explosions in the Sky, Cut Copy, Braid, MiM0sa, Gang Gang Dance, The Pains of Being Pure at Heart, Washed Out, Toro Y Moi, The Dodos, Deerhoof, Japandroids, Xiu Xiu, The Hood Internet, Starfucker, Viva Voce, Asobi Seksu, Owen, Someone Still Loves You Boris Yeltsin, Jessica Lea Mayfield, Unknown Mortal Orchestra, Bear Hands, Youth Lagoon, Bass Drum of Death, The Luyas, The Parson Red Heads, Midnight Magic, Gardens & Villa, Ivan & Alyosha, Mansions on the Moon, NewVillager, Grave Babies, Adam Arcuragi, Allen Strong, Ava Luna, Bachelorette, Big Troubles, DJ Britche$, The Capstan Shafts, Common Loon, D-Roka, Evil Tents, Take Care, Withershins, Death Tram.

== 2012 ==
The 2012 Pygmalion Music Festival ran from September 27–29.

Lineup (headliners in bold)
Grizzly Bear, Dirty Projectors, Dinosaur Jr., Hum, Best Coast, Cloud Nothings, Tennis, Willis Earl Beal, Eternal Summers, Julia Holter, Frankie Rose, Lætitia Sadier, Hundred Waters, Owen, Hospitality, Lord Huron, Night Beds, Craft Spells, Big Freedia, Oh No Oh My, Zeus, My Jerusalem, Psychic Twin, An Evening With Your Mother, Anna Kerina/Anna Karenina, DJ Belly, Broken Light, Cody & the Gateway Drugs, Common Loon, The Curses, DeathTram, The Dirty Feathers, Elsinore, Evil Tents, Grandkids, Hank, Jared Bartman, Megan Johns, DJ Mertz, Midstress, My Werewolf Diary, New Ruins, Pamela Machala, DJ Randall Ellison, Santah, Mille Nomi, Sun Stereo, Take Care, That's No Moon, Withershins, Year of the Bobcat

== 2013 ==
The 2013 Pygmalion Music Festival ran from September 26–28.

Lineup (headliners in bold)
Major Lazer, The Breeders, The Head and the Heart, Dawes, Kurt Vile and the Violators, Youth Lagoon, Warpaint, Daughter, METZ, Damien Jurado, Kishi Bashi, Psychic Twin, Jenny Hval, Murder By Death, Caveman, K.Flay, Saturday Looks Good To Me, On an On, Nat Baldwin, Common Loon, Détective, The Dirty Feathers, Elsinore, Grandkids, Justin Walter, The Struggle, Barrowe, Sun Stereo, Mille Nomi, Hank.

== 2014 ==
The 2014 Pygmalion Festival ran from September 25–28.

Lineup (headliners in bold)
CHVRCHES, American Football, Panda Bear, Real Estate, Tycho, Sun Kil Moon, Deafheaven, Speedy Ortiz, Mutual Benefit, Ex Hex, Wooden Shjips, Common Loon, Elsinore, Twinsmith.

== 2015 ==
The 2015 Pygmalion Festival ran from September 23–27.

Lineup (headliners in bold)
Run the Jewels, Ride, Purity Ring, Sylvan Esso, Tune-yards, Zola Jesus, Strands of Oaks, Whitey Morgan and the 78's, Ryley Walker, Bully, and many more.
