= Gospel Book (disambiguation) =

A Gospel Book is a book, especially a manuscript book, containing the Gospels of the New Testament.

Gospel Book may also refer to:

- Gospel Book (British Library, Add MS 40618), a late-8th-century illuminated Irish book with 10th-century Anglo-Saxon additions
- Gospel Book (British Library, MS Egerton 768), a mid-9th-century illuminated Latin book from Northern France
- Gospel Book (British Library, Royal MS 1. B. VII), an 8th-century Anglo-Saxon book
- Gospel Book (Modena, Biblioteca Estense, Gr. I), a late-10th-century Byzantine book
- Gospel Book (National Library of Greece, Codex 2603), a historic codex attributed to the scribe Matthew of the Hodegon Monastery

== See also ==
- Gospel (disambiguation)
