= Some Racing, Some Stopping =

Studio album by Headlights
- Released: March 6, 2008
- Recorded: 2007
- Genre: Indie pop
- Length: 33:03
- Label: Polyvinyl Record Co.

Headlights chronology
| Keep Your Friends and Loves Close. Keep the City You Call Home Closer (2007) | Some Racing, Some Stopping (2008) | Remixes (2008) |

Professional ratings
Aggregate scores
| Source | Rating |
|---|---|
| Metacritic | 77/100 link |
Review scores
| Source | Rating |
| AbsolutePunk.net | 88% link |
| Allmusic | link |
| Pitchfork Media | 6.8/10 link |
| Northern Star | 10/10 link |

Some Racing, Some Stopping is an album by Headlights released on March 6, 2008. The band embarked on a US tour with Evangelicals in support of the album.

== Track listing ==
1. "Get Yer Head Around It" - 3:24
2. "Cherry Tulips" - 3:28
3. "Market Girl" - 3:34
4. "On April 2" - 2:36
5. "School Boys" - 3:14
6. "Some Racing, Some Stopping" - 3:57
7. "So Much for the Afternoon" - 3:16
8. "Catch Them All" - 2:57
9. "Towers" - 2:57
10. "January" - 3:49

== Trivia ==
- The poster for the European Tour was designed by Berlin-based design studio Zwölf.
