= GBE =

GBE or Gbe may refer to:

== Organizations ==
- Gale Banks Engineering, a company created by hot rodder Gale Banks
- Glory Boyz Entertainment (also known as GloGang), a rap label
- Great Big Events, a sports and event management company
- Government Business Enterprise, a business enterprise in which a government/state has significant control
- Great British Energy

== Science ==
- Genome Biology and Evolution, a scientific journal
- Glycogen branching enzyme, an enzyme
- The general balance equation, a simplified mass balance relation

== Other uses ==
- Gbe languages, spoken in West Africa
- GBE (Order of the British Empire), Knight/Dame Grand Cross of the Order of the British Empire
- Gospel Book (British Library, MS Egerton 768), an illuminated Gospel Book in Latin
- GBE, the IATA code for Sir Seretse Khama International Airport
- Gigabit Ethernet (GbE), in computing

== See also ==
- G. B. Edwards (disambiguation)
