= Beauty shop =

Beauty shop may refer to:

== In retail and services ==
- Beauty salon – a service offering various in-store treatments related to cosmetics and beauty
- Beauty store – a retail shop selling cosmetics and personal care items

== In culture ==
- Beauty Shop, a 2005 film
- The Beauty Shop (film), a 1922 film
- The Beauty Shop (band), an Americana rock band
