= Kill Them with Kindness =

Kill Them with Kindness refers to:

- Kill Them with Kindness (The Jealous Sound album)
- Kill Them with Kindness (Headlights album)
- "Kill 'Em with Kindness", song on Can't Get Enough, an Eddy Grant album
- "Kill Em with Kindness", a song by Selena Gomez
- "Kill 'Em with Kindness", a 2017 episode of Regular Show
