= Evangelical (disambiguation) =

Evangelical means an adherent of Evangelicalism, the Protestant interdenominational religious movement with origins in First Great Awakening.

Evangelical or Evangelicals may also refer to:

- Lutheranism, one of the largest branches of Protestantism
- Pertaining to the gospel, the central message of Christianity
- Pertaining to Protestantism, the branch of Christianity, e.g. Evangelical Lutheran, Evangelical Reformed, Evangelical Methodist
- Low church, a reform movement within the Church of England
- Evangelicals (band), an indie rock band

== See also ==
- Evangelion (disambiguation)
- Evangelism, preaching the Christian gospel
