= Headlights (band) =

American indie rock band

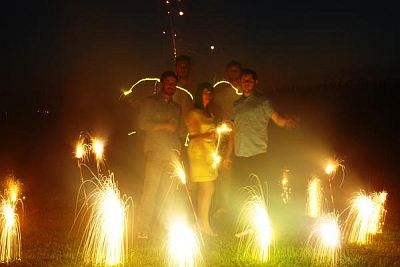
- Headlights.

Background information
- Origin: Champaign, Illinois, USA
- Genres: Indie rock Indie pop Dream pop
- Years active: 2004–2012
- Labels: Polyvinyl Record Company
- Members: Erin Fein (vocals, keyboards, tambourine); Brett Sanderson (drums); Tristan Wraight (vocals, guitar, bass); Nick Sanborn (bass, keyboards, accordion) (2007-present)

Headlights was an American indie rock band from Champaign, Illinois on Polyvinyl Records. The band was formed following the dissolution of Absinthe Blind, when members Seth, Erin and Brett Sanderson formed a band named Orphans. It was only when Tristan Wraight joined that Headlights was formed.

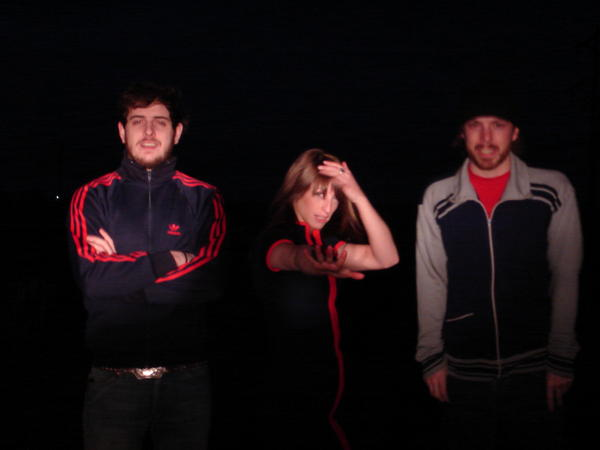
Headlights.

Headlights released The Enemies EP in 2004, and followed that up in 2006 with a split single with Canadian indie rock band The Most Serene Republic. Later in 2006, the band released their debut album, Kill Them with Kindness, which received generally positive reviews. Nick Sanborn (of Decibully) and John Owen (of fellow Champaign group Shipwreck) joined the group during the summer of 2007. In 2008, their third album, Some Racing, Some Stopping, was released.

In February 2008, Headlights covered the Evangelicals song Skeleton Man in a web-exclusive for Pitchfork Media.

In May 2008, several of Headlight's songs from Some Racing, Some Stopping were featured in the radio channel of the PC game Audiosurf.

Headlights were managed by Bob Andrews and Adam Klavohn at Undertow Music Collective.

In an interview with Brett Sanderson published January 2012, Headlights was confirmed to be disbanded.

== Discography ==
- The Enemies EP, CD/12" (2004, Polyvinyl Record Company)
- EP2, CD-R/12" (2005, self-released)
- Split single with The Most Serene Republic, 7" (2005, Polyvinyl Record Company)
- Kill Them with Kindness, CD/12" (2006, Polyvinyl Record Company)
- Keep Your Friends and Loves Close. Keep the City You Call Home Closer, CD (2007, Polyvinyl Record Company)
- Some Racing, Some Stopping, CD/12" (2008, Polyvinyl Record Company)
- Remixes, CD/12" (2008, Polyvinyl Record Company)
- Wildlife, CD/12" (2009, Polyvinyl Record Company)
