= The Evening Descends =

Studio album by Evangelicals
- Released: January 22, 2008
- Recorded: 2006–2007 in Norman, OK
- Genre: Indie rock, space rock
- Length: 45:10
- Label: Dead Oceans
- Producer: Evangelicals

Evangelicals chronology
So Gone (2006)	The Evening Descends (2008)

Singles from The Evening Descends
- 1. ""Skeleton Man"" Released: January 15, 2008

Professional ratings
Review scores
Source	Rating
Pitchfork	8.3/10

The Evening Descends is the second album by Norman, Oklahoma band Evangelicals. The album employs a storybook structure, with many of the songs involving narratives that relate to one another. The album was given an 8.3/10.0 by Pitchfork.

== Track listing ==
1. "The Evening Descends" - 3:09
2. "Midnight Vignette" - 3:00
3. "Skeleton Man" - 4:25
4. "Stoned Again" - 4:32
5. "Party Crashin'" - 5:12
6. "Snowflakes" - 4:12
7. "How Do You Sleep?" - 3:15
8. "Bellawood" - 5:32
9. "Paperback Suicide" - 3:54
10. "Here in the Deadlights" - 3:52
11. "Bloodstream" - 4:14
