= Breton Gospel Book (British Library, MS Egerton 609) =

Egerton MS 609
- Breton Gospel Book
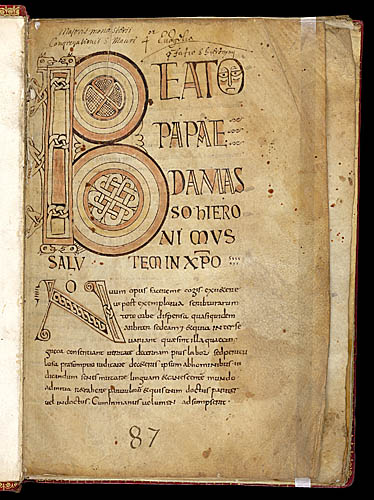
- Language: Latin
- Date: 9th century
- Genre: Gospel Book

British Library, Egerton MS 609 is a Breton Gospel Book from the late or third quarter of the ninth century. It was created in France, though the exact location is unknown. The large decorative letters which form the beginning of each Gospel are similar to the letters found in Carolingian manuscripts, but the decoration of these letters is closer to that found in insular manuscripts, such as the Book of Kells and the Lindisfarne Gospels. However, the decoration in the Breton Gospel Book is simpler and more geometric in form than that found in the Insular manuscripts. The manuscript contains the Latin text of St Jerome's letter to Pope Damasus and his commentary on Matthew, the four Gospels, prefatory material (an introduction), and canon tables (an index for a medieval manuscript). This manuscript is part of the Egerton Collection in the British Library.

== Provenance ==
The Breton Gospel Book was produced in France, most likely in Brittany or Tours. In the fifteenth century, the Benedictine Abbey of St. Martin at Tours owned the manuscript; it has the inscription "Iste Liber est de Ecclesia beatissimi Martini Turonensis" on folio 102v (the last page). The Breton Gospel Book was then acquired by the Maurist Abbey of Marmoutiers, also in Tours, during the eighteenth century, as evidenced by the inscription "Majoris monasterii Congregationis S Mauri" on folio 1r (the first page). It was bought in 1836 by the British Museum, using money that was left to them from Francis Egerton, 8th Earl of Bridgewater. When he died in 1829, Egerton donated £12,000 and 67 manuscripts to the British Museum for the creation of the Egerton Collection. The money also created the Bridgewater Fund, which was used to buy more manuscripts. Before 1973, the British Library had been part of the British Museum, but the British Library Act in 1972 separated the library from the museum. Since then, the manuscript has resided at the British Library, and is part of the Egerton Collection.

== Description ==
The manuscript is believed to be part of the 'Irish-Northumbrian' group. Other manuscripts considered 'Irish-Northumbrian' are the Book of Armagh, the Lichfield Gospels, the Book of Kells and the MacRegol Gospels. There have long been cross-cultural artistic connections between the British Isles and Brittany, which is especially evident in medieval manuscripts, due to their locations across the channel from each other. Breton manuscripts resemble British and Irish decoration with their animal ornamentation, interlace and other designs; while also using the script developed at Tours and earlier Continental decoration.

=== Contents ===
The Breton Gospels Book contains St. Jerome's letter to Pope Damasus, The Prologue of St Jerome's commentary on St Matthew, and the four gospels of Matthew, Mark, Luke and John. It also includes prefatory material and canon tables, an index for a medieval manuscript. It consists of 102 folios, plus two unfoliated paper flyleaves. The book's dimensions are 310 by 210 mm, or about 12.2 by 8.3 inches. The text space for the script is 230 by 145 mm, or about 9.1 by 5.7 inches, with varying of lines of text per page. The Breton Gospels Book is written in Latin, with Caroline minuscule script. It is thought that the book was copied by an Insular scribe. It is a parchment codex, with ink and pigments on vellum, and was bound after 1600 with red gilt leather, gold tooled paper, and marbled end papers.

Carolingian minuscule began in the eighth century under Charlemagne, but became popular in the ninth century and was created from half-uncial script. Insular script developed in Ireland before spreading to the British Isles and other parts of Europe. Insular script, also known as Insular minuscule, was based on half-uncial. Majuscule in script is for when the letters are capitalized, not lower-cased.

This manuscript has countless items in the margins. Most of it is script, but some of them are small designs.

=== Decoration ===
St. Jerome's letter to Pope Damasus was usually placed before the texts of the gospels in a manuscript, and is called 'Novum Opus' because of its first words. In the O of 'Beato' there is a face which was a common decoration in early medieval manuscripts. The face is this manuscript is simple; it has lines forming a basic outline of a human face.

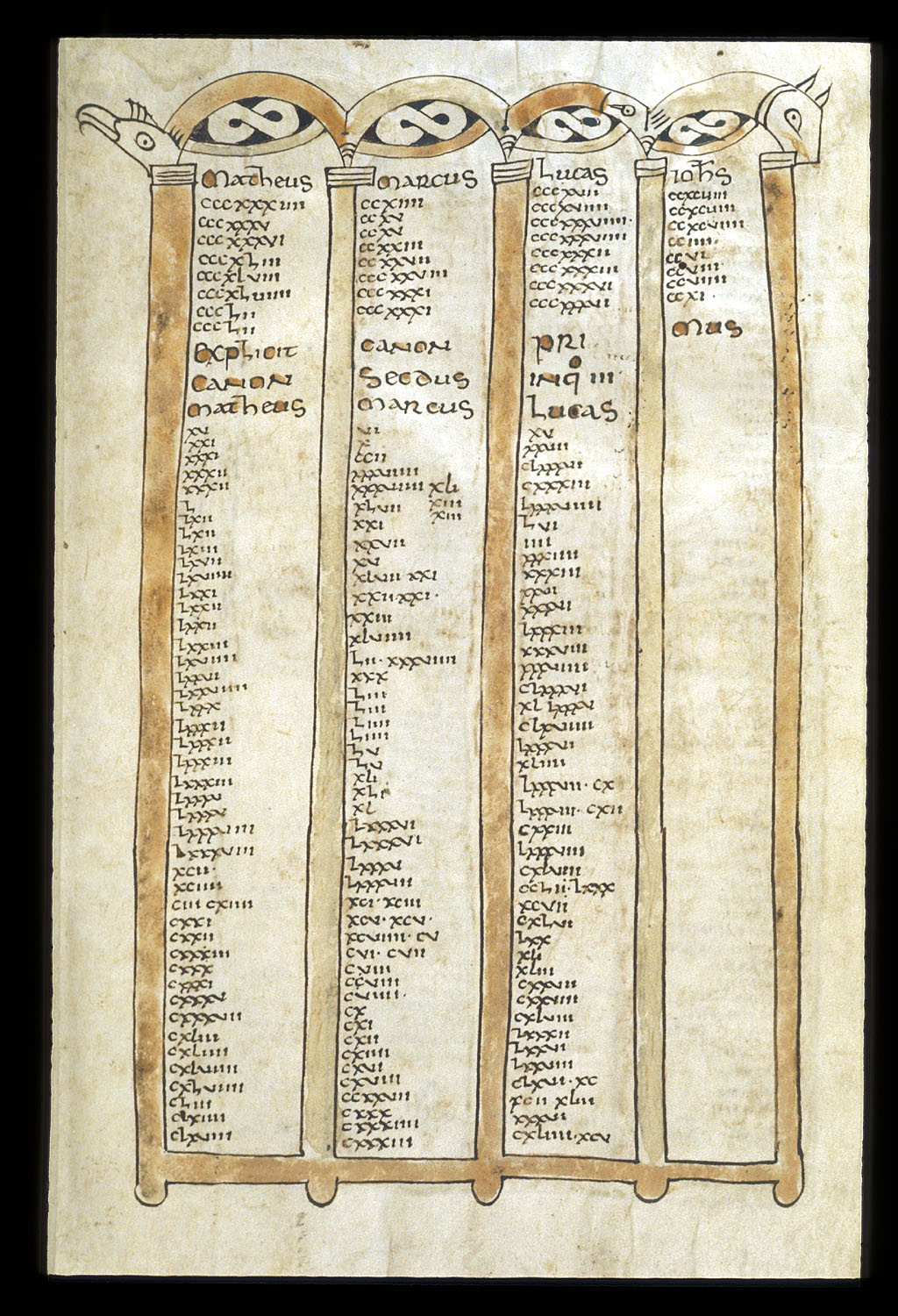
Folio 4r. Canon table in a micro-architectural frame and beak heads.

The canon tables are Eusebian Canon tables. Canon tables were used to divide up the gospels in a manuscript and are similar to a table of contents. The canon tables from folio 3v to 7r are in frames with brown and yellow. The canon tables' design changes between the open folio leaves. Some have animal heads at the ends, while others have organic designs. The canon tables on folio 3v to 4r have animal heads on both the top ends of each outer column. On folio 3v, both animal heads are the same and look like birds; whereas on folio 4r, they are different. The animal head on the left looks like a bird, where on the right it is another animal. Folio 4r on the second to the right column has a design at the top where it forms the arches, which the other side does not have. The canon tables are also inside a decorative micro-architecture frame. The canon tables on 4v and 5r only have a single animal head on each page. They are each on the column facing the index of the manuscript (on 4v it is the far-right column, and on 5r the far-left column). These frames also have less decoration, and are more simplistic. On folios 5v and 6r, they become simply lined frames. Folios 6v and 7r are almost the same except for small ornamentation at the cornered ends of the columns. Folio 6v has small curved ends at each of the bottom outer ends of the columns. The one on the right looks similar to an animal head. Where on folio 7r it has different swirling designs at the ends of the frames.

There are four large initials that are decorated within the manuscript. They are mostly in brown, orange, yellow and some blue. They all show elements of interlace and zoomorphism. These letters occur on folios 1r (Jerome's letter to Pope Damasus), 8r (the Gospel of Matthew), 46r (the Gospel of Mark) and 79r (the Gospel of John). Luke's was the only Gospel that did not have a large decorative initial. There are other initials on folio 1r, 2v (The Prologue of St Jerome's commentary on St Matthew), 7v (the preface to Matthew), 44v (the preface to Mark) and 77v (the preface to John) that are also decorated but not to the size and extent as the other ones. It was common in the Middle Ages to have a preface for each gospel. The prefaces in the Egerton manuscript are the so-called Monarchian Prologues. Luke is again the only saint not to have a preface or a decorated beginning. They also used the same colors, along with interlace and zoomorphism. Many of the beginning initials are highlighted or filled in with orange, brown and yellow, some of them having more than one color. It is thought that the monastery was not wealthy because the manuscript was modestly produced, along with a limited variety of colors.

There are similarities from the colophon of Luke from the Bibliothèque Nationale MS nouv. acq. lat. 1587 to that in Egerton 609. The Bibliothèque Nationale MS nouv. acq. lat. 1587 was produced in the 8th to 9th century in Brittany.

==== Matthew ====
The beginning to the gospel of Matthew is similar to that of the beginning of the Gospel of Mark. The animal heads and interlace which appear on the 'LI' are related to styles that have been transformed and simplified from early medieval Northern and Western France. These designs are more geometric than that of extravagantly curving letters found in Anglo-Saxon and Irish manuscripts, they have more in common with the classicising letters found in Charlemagne's court.

==== Mark ====
In the preface of the Gospel of Mark, the design in the first letter in 'Marcus' is a unique variation in Anglo-Saxon England and Ireland gospel books made from the eighth and ninth centuries. For this letter the shape and interlace have been modified into linked geometric patterns, where traditionally they use spirals and curves.

The beginning of the Gospel of Mark is similar to the decorations in gospel books from Britain and Ireland in the eighth and ninth centuries. The title is written at the top of the folio (f. 8r) in capital letters with color added to the script. The beginning letters of the gospel are almost the size of the page and slowly shrink until it becomes standard script. The larger letters also have color added to them, while the regular script does not. The first two letters 'IN' at the start of the gospel are decorated with animal heads and interlace. These two letters are also unified, which first appears in the late 7th century in Irish manuscripts. The decoration with the animal heads and the interlace shows the Breton tradition of imitating Irish and similar art in manuscripts.

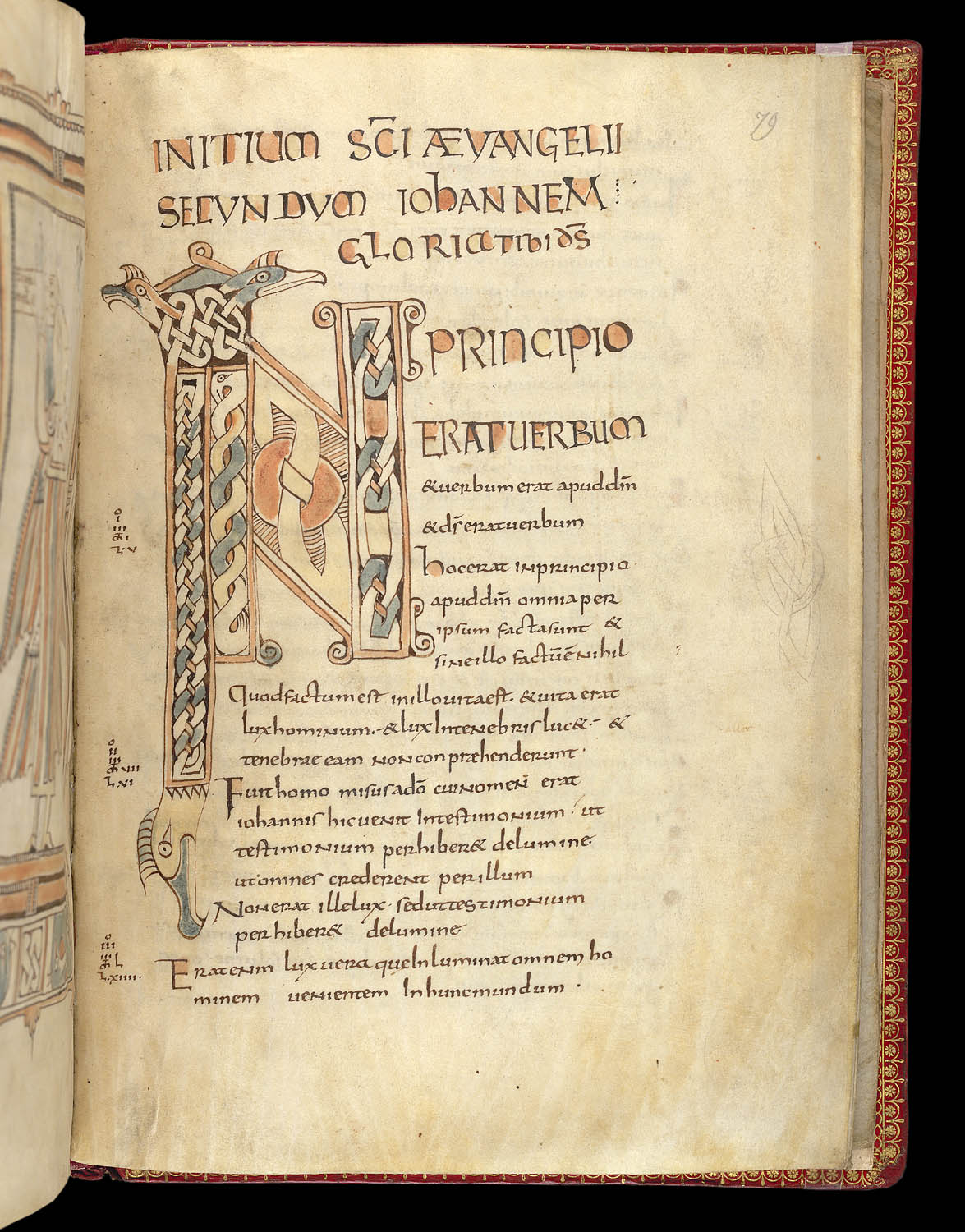
Folio 79r. The beginning of John has a zoomorphic word with the initials 'IN' with bird heads and interlace.

==== John ====
The beginning gospel of John is the same as the beginning gospels to that of Mark and Matthew. The first two letters are 'IN', just like Mark's, but both have varied artist style and are not exact replicas of each other. The simplified designs of interlace show the change from the intricate designs in manuscripts like in the Lichfield Gospels. The manuscript has two full-page miniature portraits of Mark (f. 45v) and John (f. 78v). Another way of portraying the evangelists were to use their symbols, which appeared in the vision Ezekiel had, and also in the Book of Revelation, and early Christian writers interpreted the four creatures as signs of the gospels. By the ninth century, hybrid depictions of the evangelists' symbols were rarely being produced anymore. Areas that were remote, like Brittany, and not major centers were often resistant to the Carolingian standardization so the older traditions could flourish better. In the Symbol of John, there are serpents in the bottom panels of the frame which show the Breton-style of animal interlace. There were many different types of depictions of them developed early on with the combination of the animal head with a human body, just like the ones in this manuscript. According to Jerome, and the most common belief, is that Matthew is the man, Mark is the lion, Luke is the ox, and John the eagle, as depicted in the miniature portrait. Even though these interpretations were most accepted, some writers still made different pairings of animals with the saints. In the miniature portrait of Mark, the manuscript depicts him as the eagle (both Mark and John are shown as eagles), while others believed instead of him being the lion.

Folio	Section
1r-1v	St. Jerome's letter to Pope Damasus
2r-3r	The Prologue of St Jerome's commentary on St Matthew
3v-7r	Eusebian Canon Tables
7v	Preface of St. Matthew
7v-44v	Gospel of St. Matthew
24	Missing Page
44v-45r	Preface of St. Mark
45v	Portrait of St. Mark
46r-53v	Gospel of St. Mark
54r-77r	Gospel of St. Luke
77v-78r	Preface of St. John
78v	Portrait of St. John
79r-101v	Gospel of St. John
102r-102v	Extracts from the Gospel of St. John

== Gallery ==
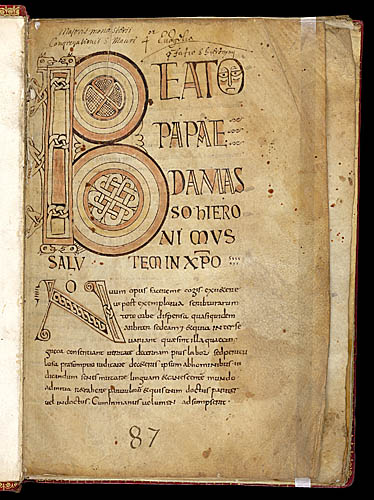
Folio 1. The beginning of Jerome's letter to Pope Damasus, along with decorated initials 'B' and 'N' and interlace.

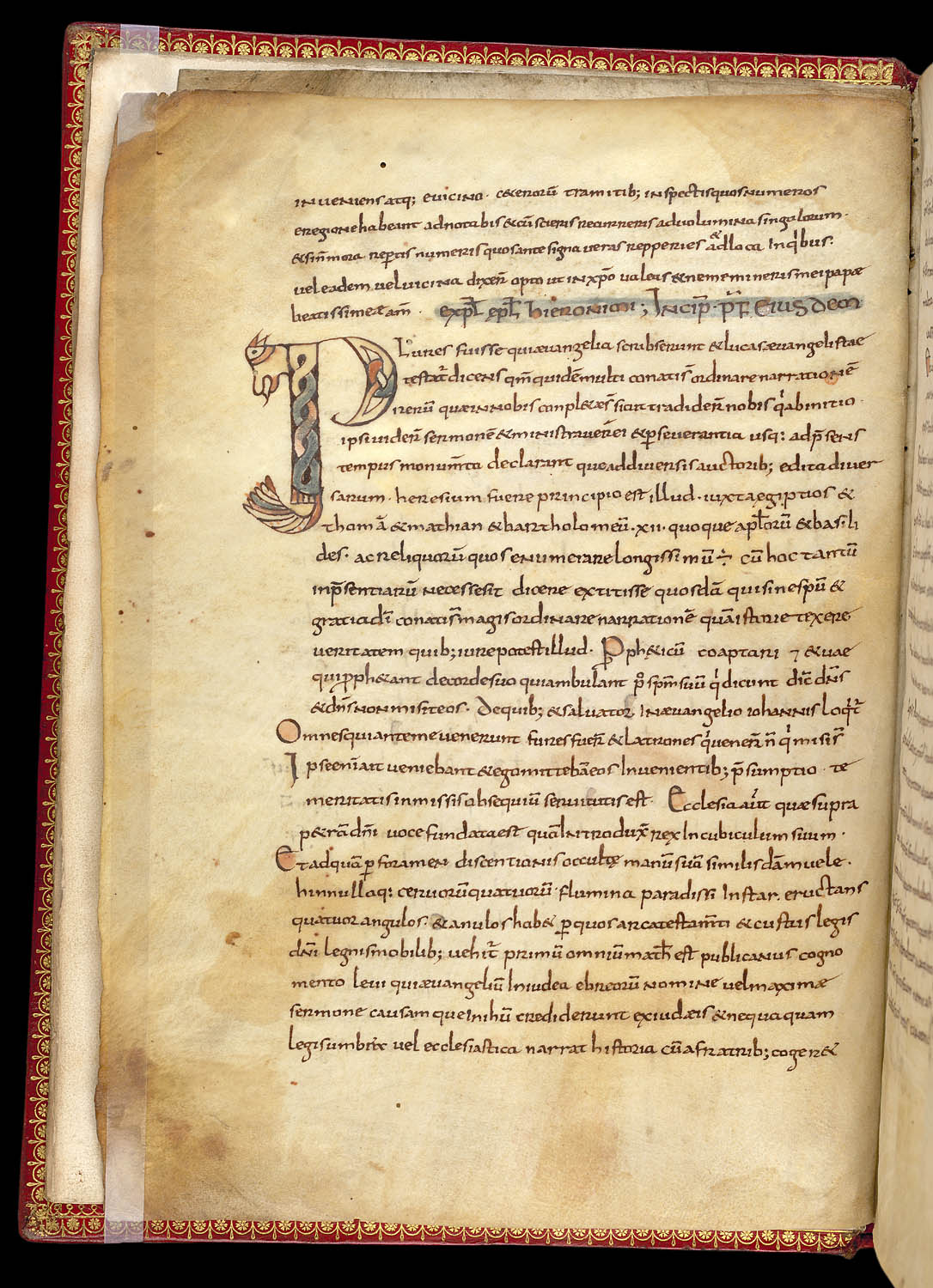
Folio 2v. Decorated initial 'P' with an animal head and a stylized tail.

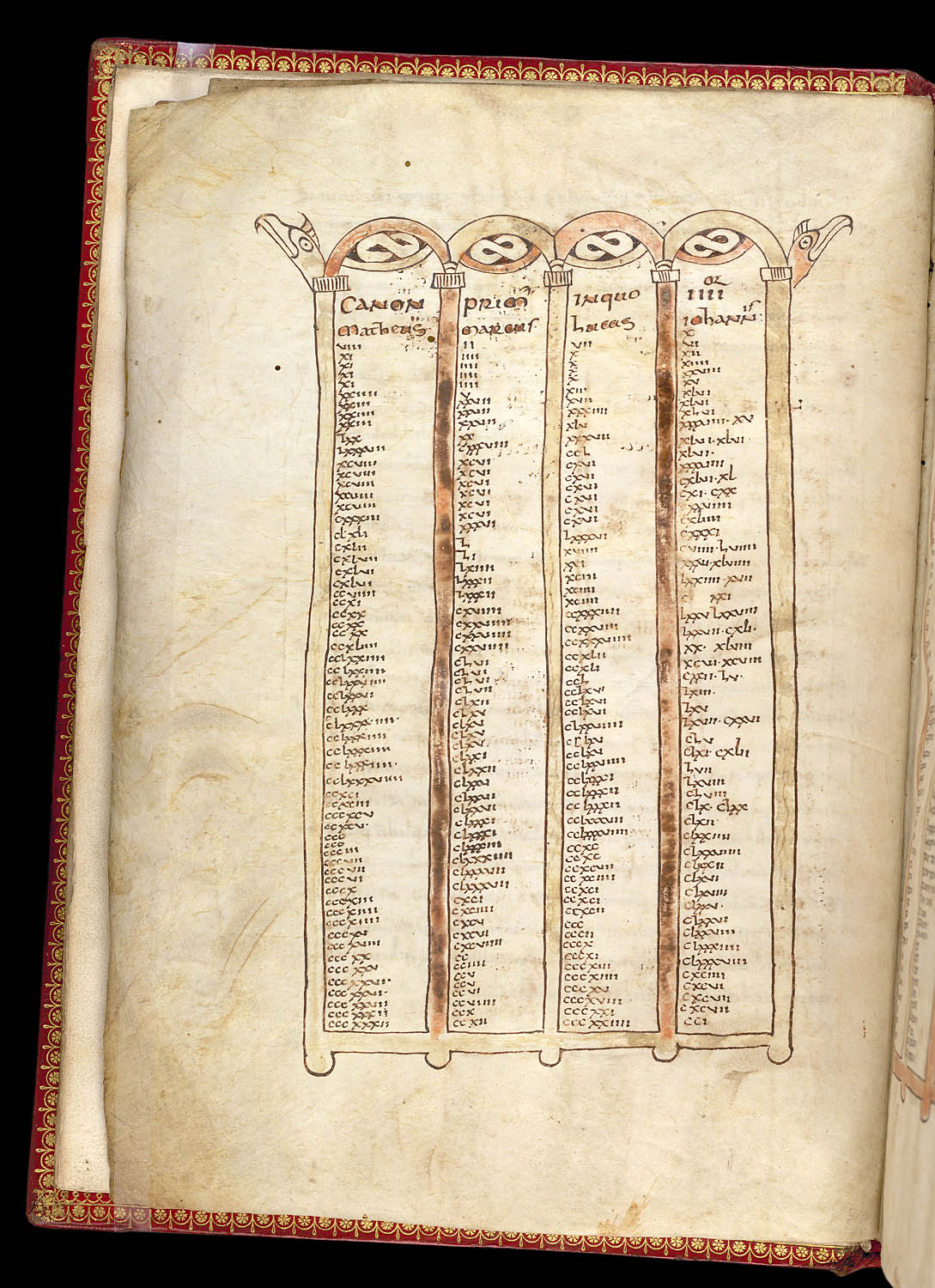
Folio 3v. Canon table with micro-architectural frame and beak heads.

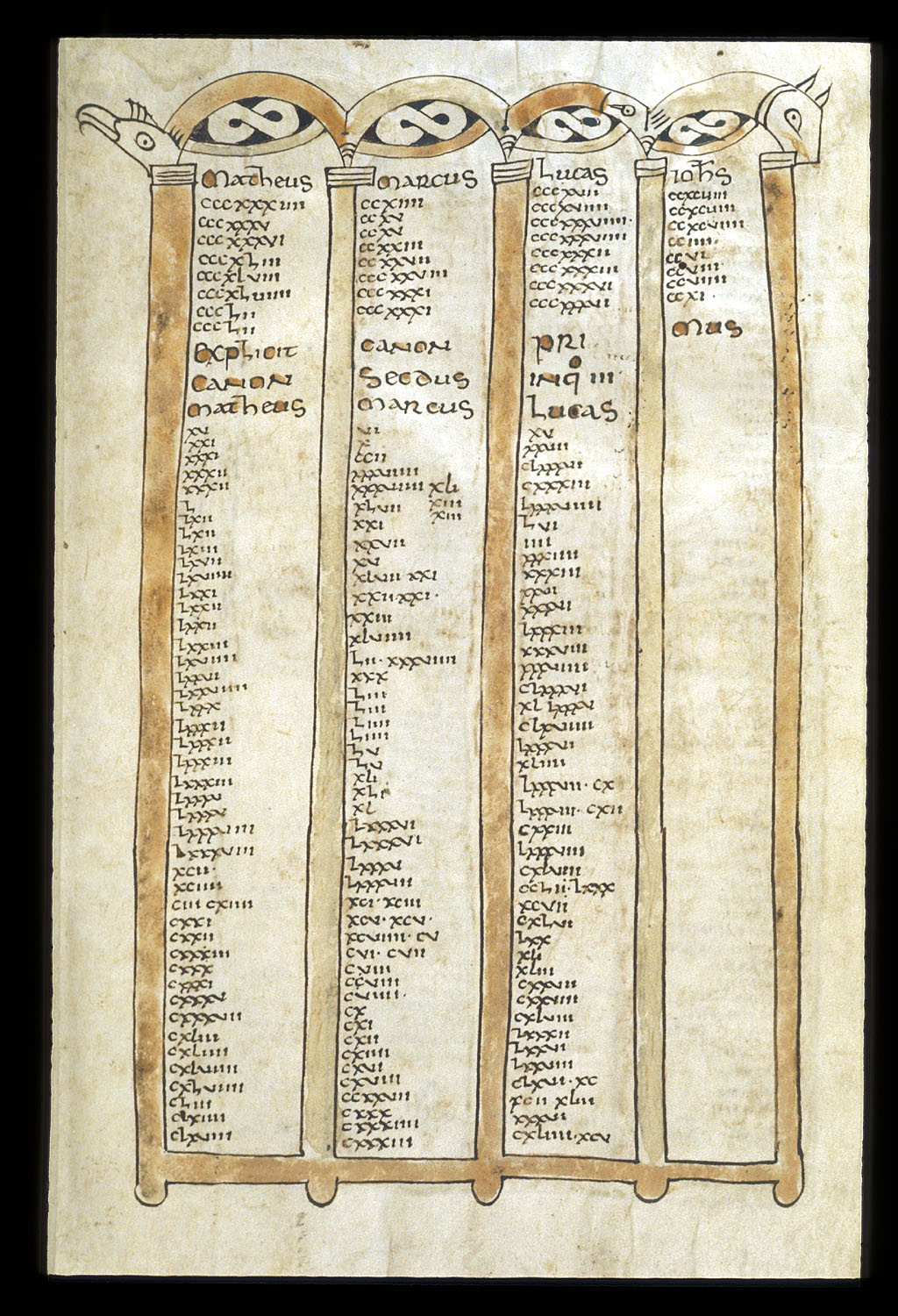
Folio 4r. Canon table in a micro-architectural frame and beak heads.

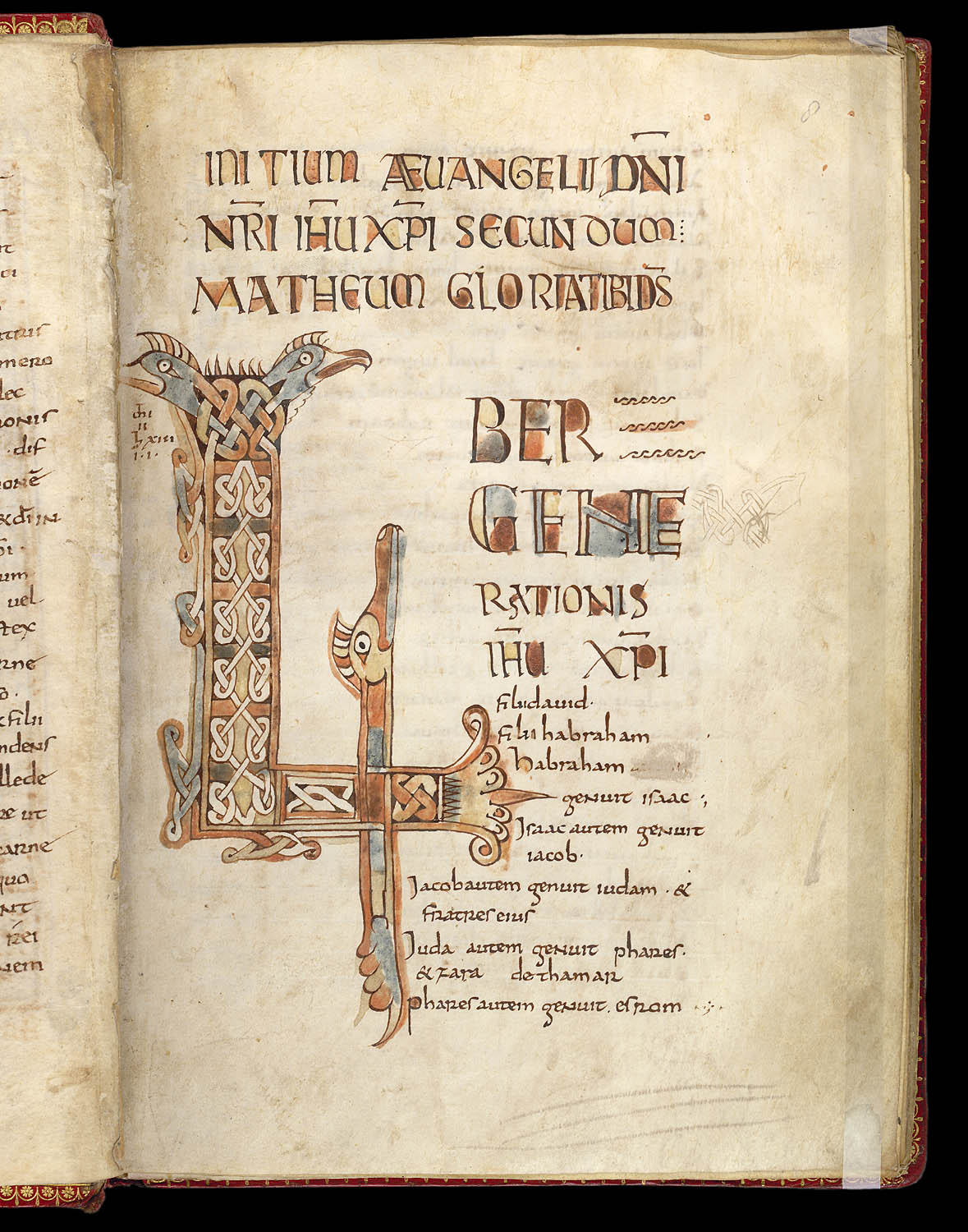
Folio 8r. Zoomorphic initial 'L' at the beginning of Matthew, which includes animal heads and interlace.

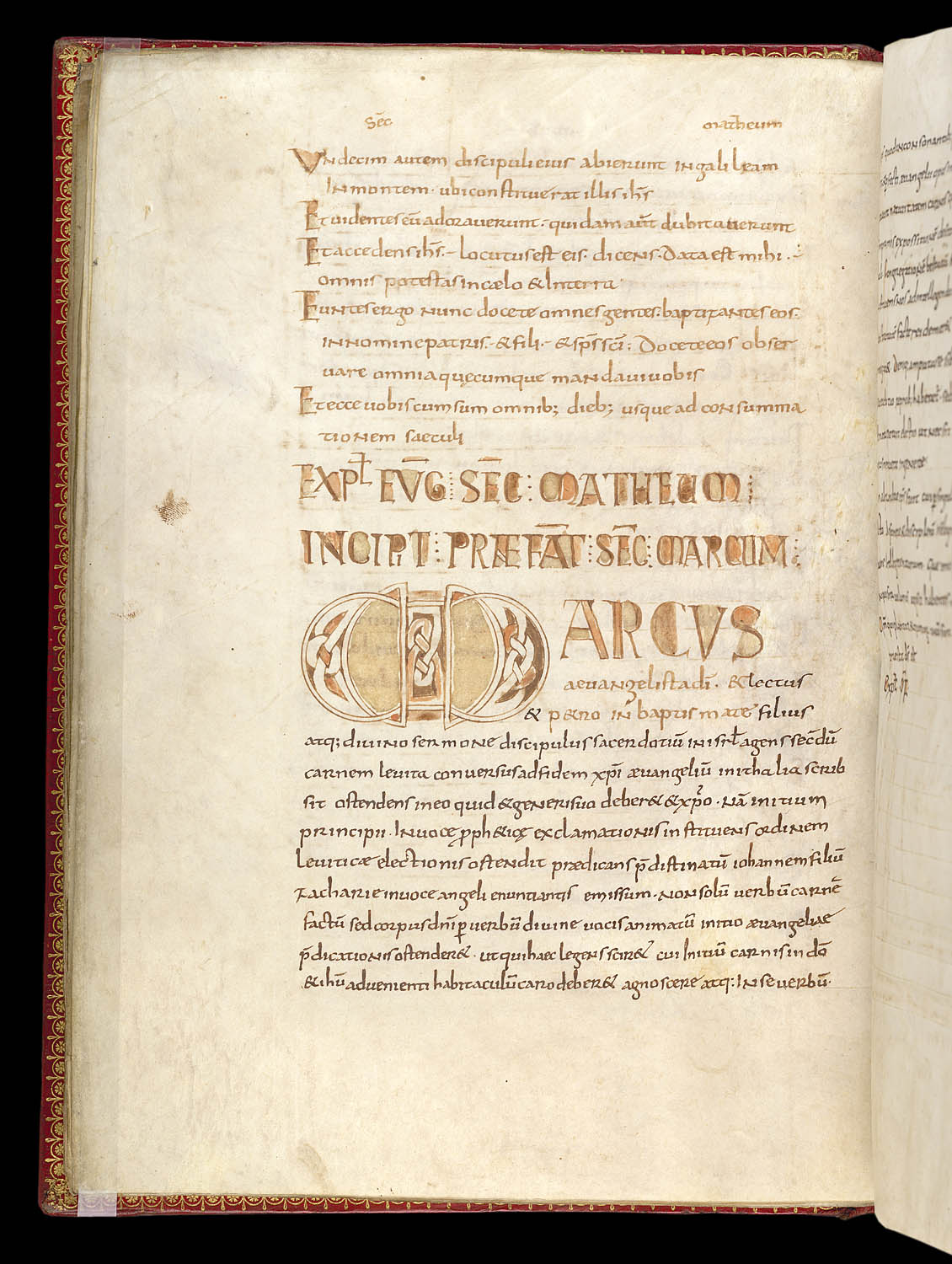
Folio 44v. At the beginning of the preface of Mark, the word 'Marcus' is decorated with geometric interlace.

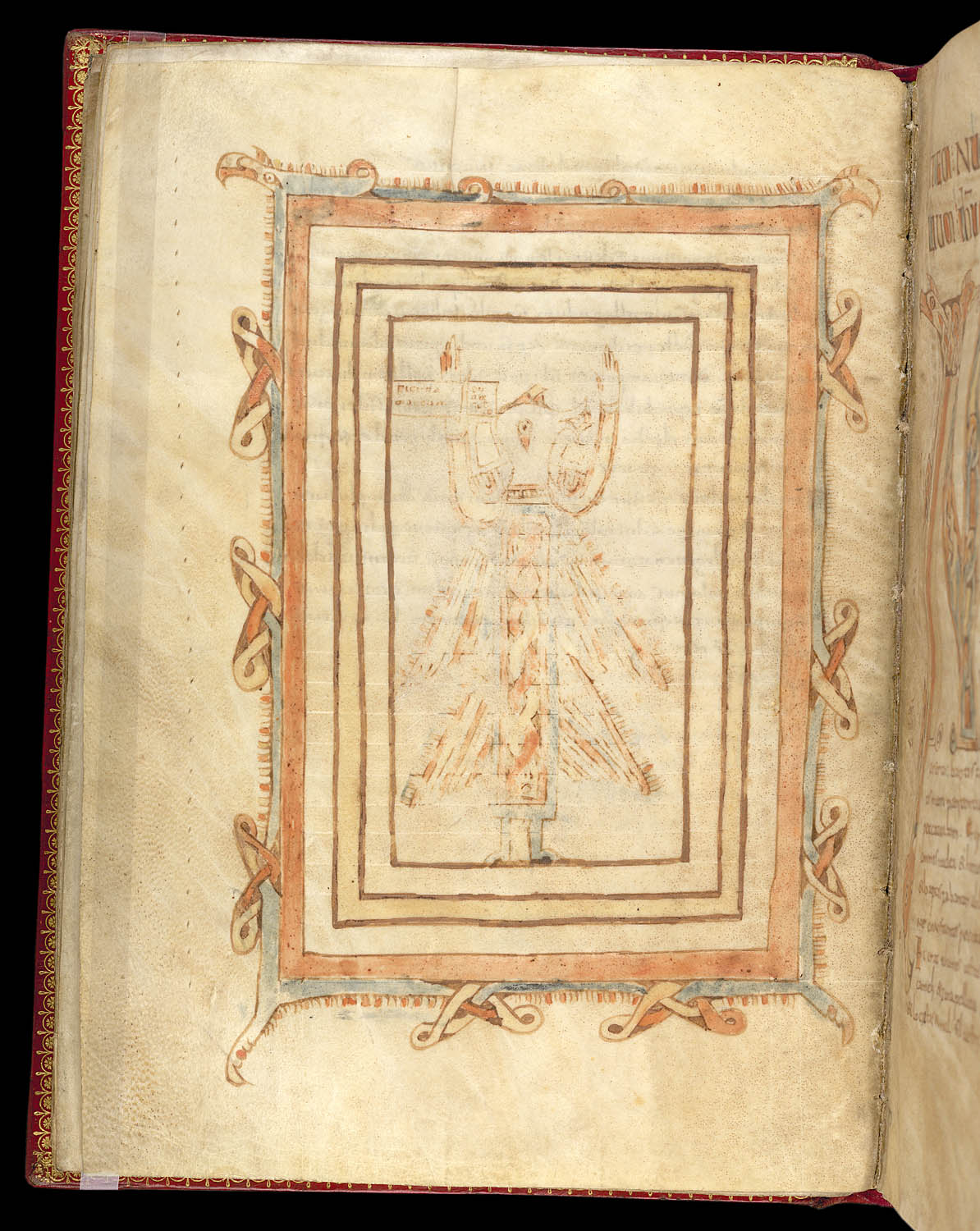
Folio 45v. A miniature portrait at the beginning of Mark of a stylised man with an eagle head in an interlace border.

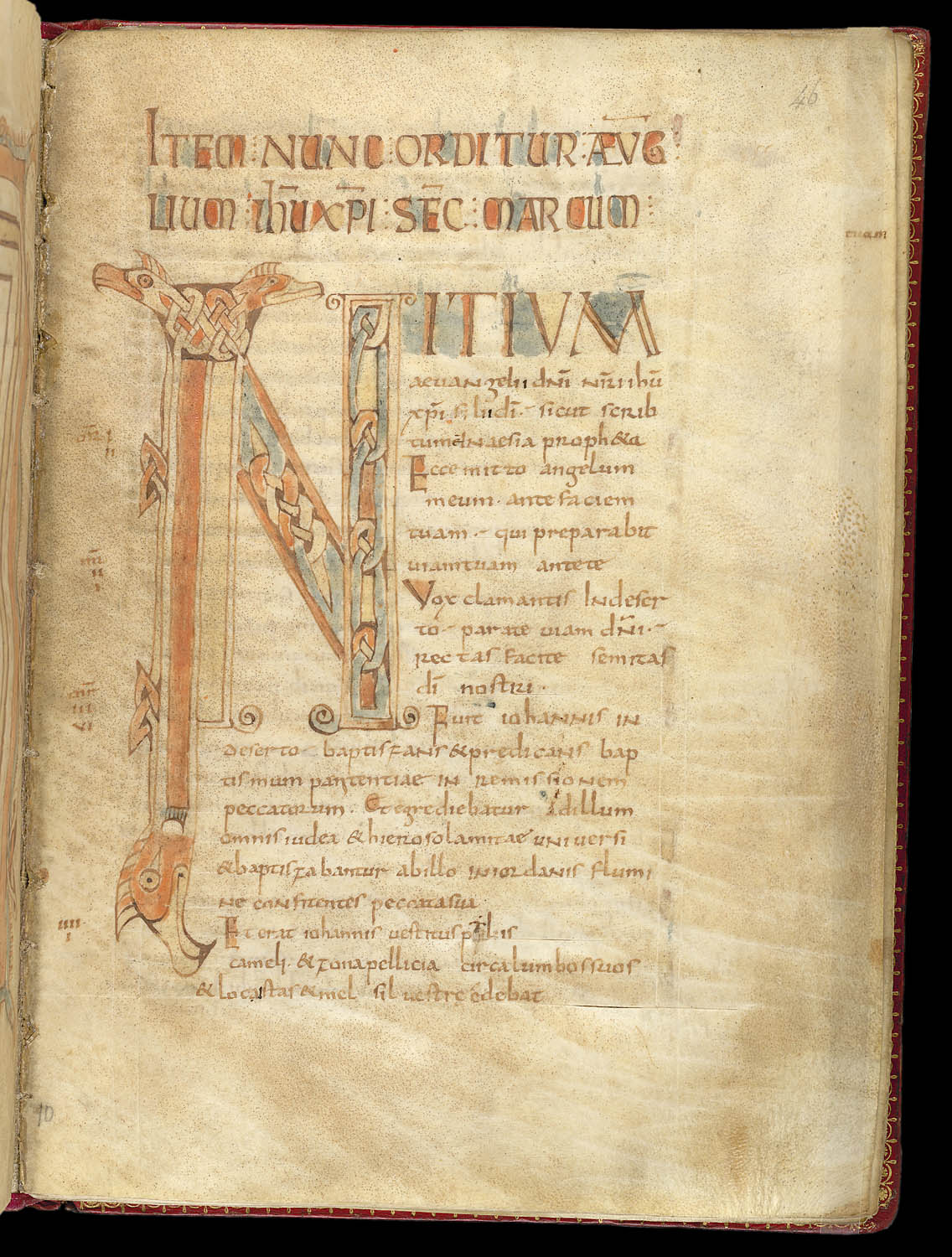
Folio 46r. A decorated initial 'I' at the beginning of Mark with animal heads and interlace.

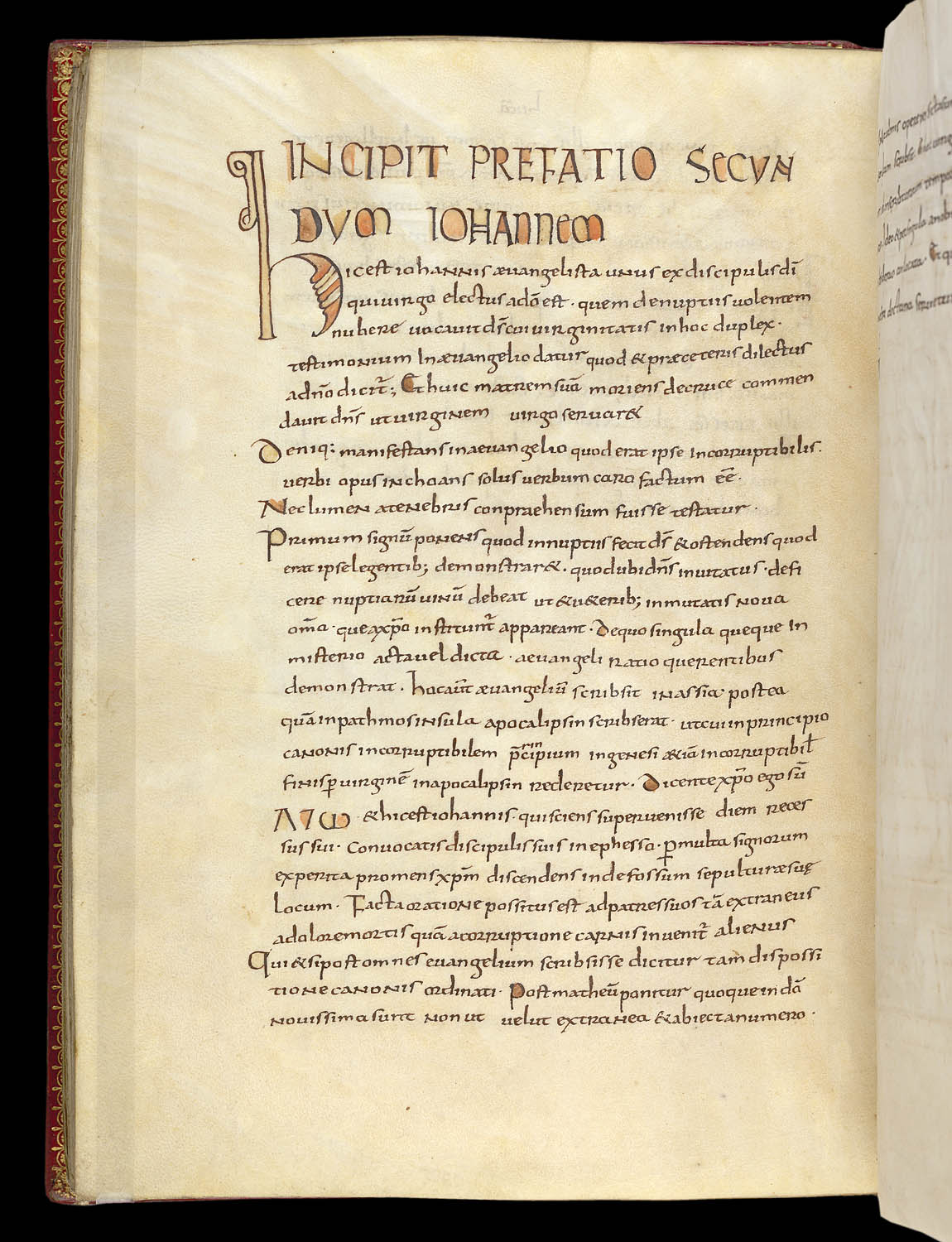
Folio 77v. The beginning of the preface to John, with a decorated initial 'H' and with colored letters.

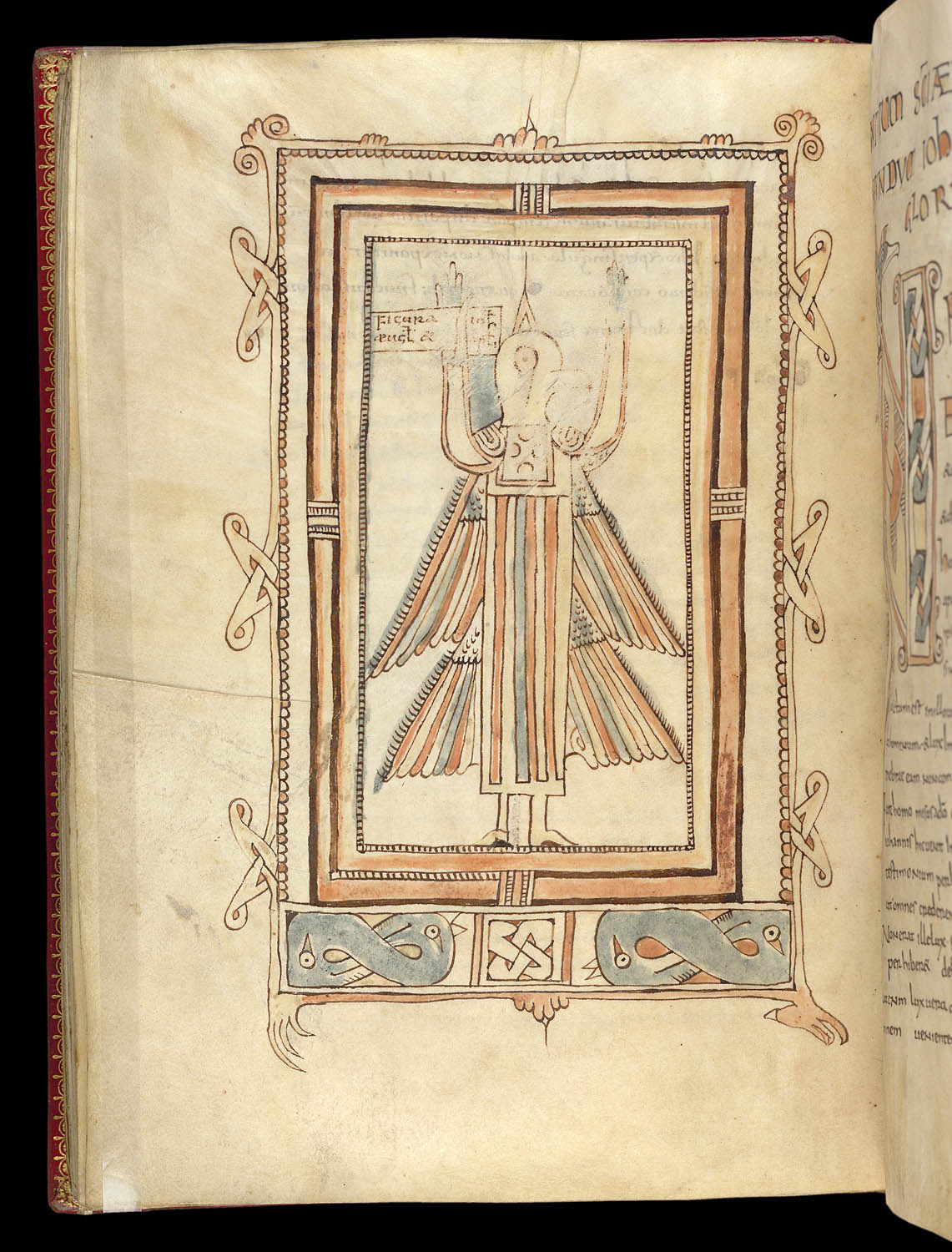
Folio 78v. A miniature portrait before the beginning of John of a standing winged figure with a bird head in an interlace border.

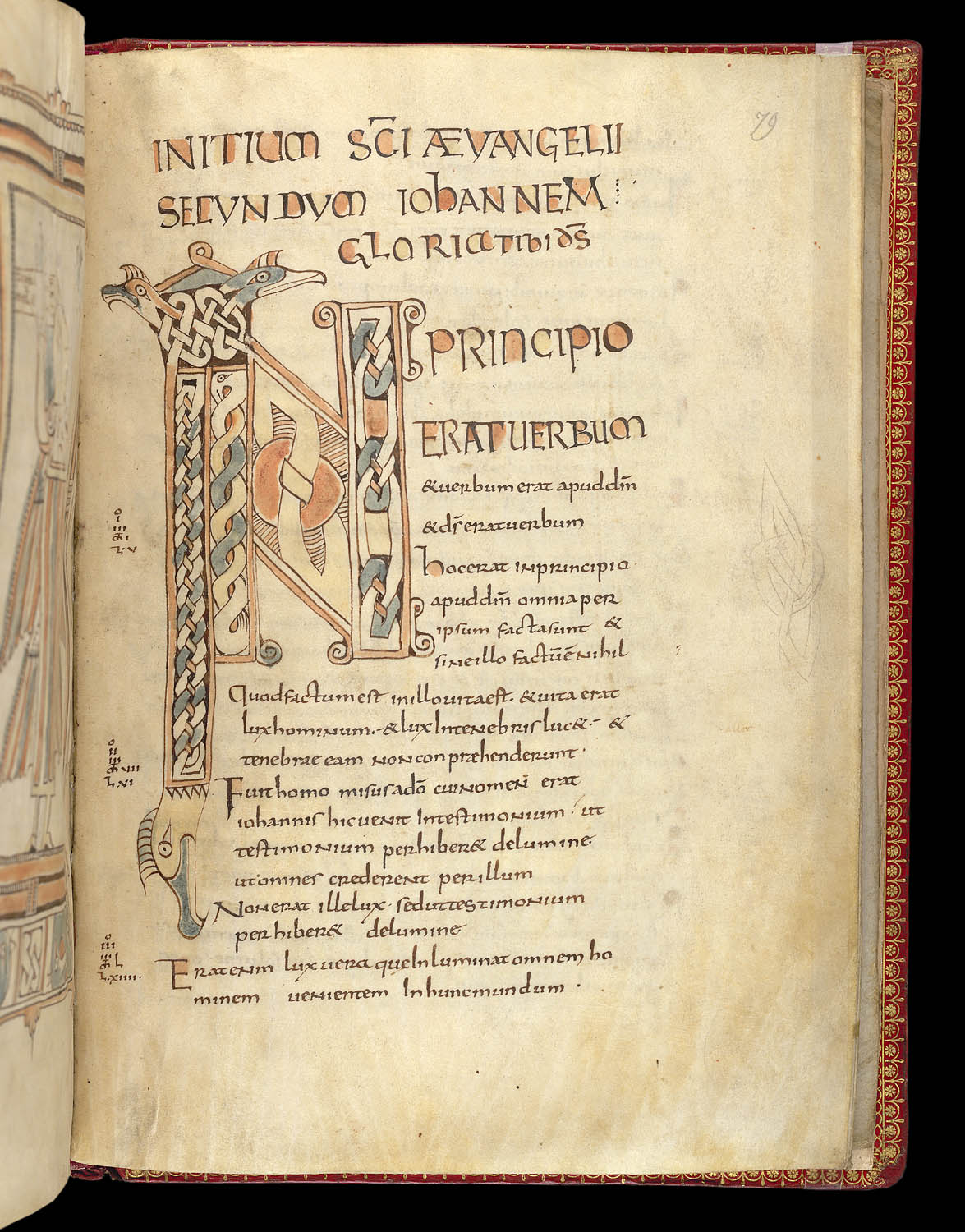
Folio 79r. The beginning of John has a zoomorphic word with the initials 'IN' with bird heads and interlace.

== See also ==
- List of Hiberno-Saxon illuminated manuscripts
- List of illuminated later Anglo-Saxon manuscripts
