= Gospel (disambiguation) =

A gospel originally meant the Christian message, but in the 2nd century it came to be used also for the books in which the message was reported.

Gospel may also refer to:

- The gospel, a religious message of salvation or thanks
- Gospel (liturgy), a reading from the Gospels used during various religious services
- Matins Gospel, a reading from the Gospels during Matins in some Eastern churches

== Literature ==
- Gospel (novel), a 1993 novel by Wilton Barnhardt
- Aradia, or the Gospel of the Witches, an 1899 book by Charles Godfrey Leland

== Music ==
- Gospel music, a genre of Christian music
- Gospel (band), an American hardcore punk band

=== Albums ===
- Gospel (Nana Mouskouri album), 1990
- Gospel (Fireworks album), 2011
- Gospel (Mica Paris album), 2020
- Gospel, a 1999 album by The Marshall Tucker Band
- Gospel, a 2008 album by Lao Che
- The Gospel Album, a 2015 album by Geoffrey Gurrumul Yunupingu

=== Songs ===
- "Gospel" (song), a 2017 song by Rich Brian, Keith Ape, and XXXTentacion
- "Gospel", a song by The Chevin from the 2012 album Borderland
- "Gospel", a song by Robbie Williams from the 2012 album Take the Crown
- "The Gospel", a song by Alicia Keys from the 2016 album Here

== Video games ==
- Gospel, the Japanese name of Treble, a fictional character in the video game series Mega Man
- NetMafia Gospel, a fictional organization in the video game Mega Man Battle Network 2

== Other uses ==
- The Gospel (film), a 2005 American film

== See also ==
- Evangelion (disambiguation)
- Gospel Book (disambiguation)
- Godspell, a 1971 musical by Stephen Schwartz
