= Gospel Book (British Library, Royal MS 1. B. VII) =

Folio 15v, a page from the Gospel of Matthew with the text of Athelstan's manumission in the lower left

British Library, Royal MS 1. B. VII, also called the Royal Athelstan Gospels, is an 8th-century Anglo-Saxon illuminated gospel book. It is closely related to the Lindisfarne Gospels, being either copied from it or from a common model. It is not as lavishly illuminated, and the decoration shows Merovingian influence. The manuscript contains the four Gospels in the Latin Vulgate translation, along with prefatory and explanatory matter. It was presented to Christ Church, Canterbury in the 920s by King Athelstan, who had recorded in a note in Old English (f.15v) that upon his accession to the throne in 925 he had freed one Eadelm and his family from slavery, the earliest recorded manumission in (post-Roman) England.

The codex has 155 vellum folios and measures 11.25 by 8.5 inches. The folios are gathered into quires of eight leaves each, with a few exceptions. The ninth gathering has only seven leaves, but does not have a loss of text that would indicate a missing leaf. The fourteenth quire had ten leaves and the final quire has only four. The sixteenth gathering has lost one folio. All but the second, sixth, and seventh gatherings have the first word of the next gathering (a catchword) at the bottom of the final page. This was done to ensure that the gatherings were placed in the proper order.

The text includes, in addition to the Gospels, the letter of Jerome to Pope Damasus (known by its first two words Novum opus), the prologue to Jerome's commentary on the Book of Matthew, the letter of Eusebius of Caesarea to Carpianus (Ammonius quidam) in which Eusebius explains the use of his Canon Tables, prologues to each of the Gospels, tables of capitula for each of the Gospels, tables for each of the Gospels indicating the festivals at which portions of that Gospel should be read, and the Eusebian Canon tables.

The manuscript was written in England, perhaps in a Northumbrian monastery connected to Lindisfarne or Monkwearmouth-Jarrow, though "the Frankish influence in the decoration and display script ... might equally suggest origins in Mercia". The text is written in insular half-uncial in two columns. There are two or more hands found in the manuscript. Each chapter begins with a line of text written in red ink. There are markings for the Ammonian sections in the margins.

The manuscript was copied either from the Lindisfarne Gospels, or from a common source. The text was originally almost identical to that of the Lindisfarne, however in this manuscript many readings, that are otherwise peculiar to Lindisfarne, have been erased and corrected. A significant variation from the Lindisfarne text is that after Matthew 20:28, this manuscript contains an addition which reads, in part, Vos autem queritis . . . erit tibi utilius. This addition is not found in the Lindisfarne Gospels, however it is found in an early 10th-century manuscript, also in the British Library (Royal, 1 A. XVIII). The tables of the capitula for the Gospels of Luke and John are identical to those in the Lindisfarne Gospels, as are the tables for the festival readings. These tables include festivals which were celebrated only in Naples (The Nativity of St. Januarius and the Dedication of the Basilica of Stephen). The source of the text for this manuscript and the Lindisfarne Gospels was probably a hypothetical "Neapolitan Gospelbook" brought to England by Adrian of Canterbury, a companion of Theodore of Tarsus who according to Bede had been abbot of Nisida, an (also hypothetical) monastery near Naples. Other books with the same textual character are the Stonyhurst Gospel and the St Petersburg Gospels.

The illumination in the manuscript is limited to the Canon tables and four large initials. The Gospels of Matthew, Mark, and Luke, as well as Matthew 1:18 (the first verse after the Genealogy of Jesus), are begun with enlarged initials decorated in black, red, yellow and green in an early Anglo-Saxon style. These initials are surrounded by small red dots, which is a common motif in many Insular manuscripts, including the Lindisfarne Gospels. The prologues and the Gospel of John begin with enlarged black initials which are also surrounded by red dots. The Canon Tables are under columns and arches of black lines decorated in colored designs.

These texts appear in the following order. Note the eccentric order of the prefaces to the Gospel of Luke.

- Folio 1r - The letter of Jerome (Novum opus)
- Folio 2v - Prologue to Jerome's commentary on Matthew (Plures fuisse)
- Folio 3v - Letter of Eusebius (Ammonius quidam)
- Folio 4v - Prologue to Matthew (Mattheus in Iudea)
- Folio 5r - Table of capitula for Matthew
- Folio 8r - Table of festivals readings for Matthew (Pridu (sic) natale Domini)
- Folio 9r - Eusebian Canon Tables
- Folio 15r - Gospel of Matthew
- Folio 52r - Prologue to Mark (Marchus euangelista Dei)
- Folio 52v - Table of capitula for Mark
- Folio 54v - Table of festivals readings for Mark (Sabbato sancto mane)
- Folio 55r - Gospel of Mark
- Folio 78r - Table of festivals readings for Luke, titled Secundum Lucam (In ieiunium sancti Iohannis)
- Folio 78v - Prologue to Luke (Lucas Syrus Antiochensis)
- Folio 79r - Table of capitula for Luke
- Folio 84r - Gospel of Luke
- Folio 128r - Prologue to John (Iohannes euangelista unus)
- Folio 129r - Table of capitula for John
- Folio 130r - Table of festivals readings for John titled Secundum Iohannem (In sancti Iohannis apostoli)
- Folio 130v - Gospel of John
