= Evangelion =

Evangelion refers to the gospel in Christianity, translated from the Ancient Greek word εὐαγγέλιον (euangélion; Latin: evangelium) meaning "good news".

Evangelion may also refer to:

== Biblical ==
- Gospel, a Christian text about the life of Jesus
  - Gospel of Mani, originally called the Evangelion (Classical Syriac: ܐܘܢܓܠܝܘܢ), a Manichaean text
  - Gospel of Marcion, called by its adherents the Gospel or Evangelion, a Marcionite text
- Gospel Book, a liturgical book containing one or more of the four Gospels of the New Testament
  - Nestorian Evangelion (French: Évangéliaire nestorien), a Gospel Book of the Church of the East

== Arts and entertainment ==
- Neon Genesis Evangelion (franchise), a Japanese media franchise
  - Neon Genesis Evangelion, a Japanese anime television series
  - Neon Genesis Evangelion (manga), a Japanese manga series partially based on the television series
  - Neon Genesis Evangelion (video game), 1999, based on the television series and the film The End of Evangelion
  - Evangelion (mecha), a fictional mecha in the franchise
  - Evangelion film, a set index article on Neon Genesis Evangelion films
- Evangelion (album), 2009, by Behemoth

== See also ==
- Evangelical (disambiguation)
- Good news (disambiguation)
- Gospel (disambiguation)
