= Anti-Marcionite prologues =

The prologue to Luke in the 11th-century Greek minuscule 1828

The anti-Marcionite prologues are three short prefaces to the gospels of Mark, Luke and John. No prologue to Matthew is known. They were originally written in Greek, but only the prologue to Luke survives in the original language. All three were translated into Latin and are preserved in some 40 manuscripts of the Vulgate Bible. They are not always found together. All three Latin prologues are found together in at least six manuscripts, those to Mark and Luke alone in one manuscript and those to Luke and John alone in another. That to Luke was the most popular and is found independent of the others in 22 manuscripts, while those to Mark and John are found independently in five and three manuscripts, respectively.

Donatien de Bruyne and Adolf Harnack argued that they were the earliest surviving gospel prologues and could shed valuable light on the origins of the gospels, a view no longer widely held. They are originally independent texts, not all of the same date nor by the same author. Neither are those to Mark and Luke usually regarded as directed against Marcionism, although F. F. Bruce detected anti-Marcionite tendencies in the Lukan prologue. Only the prologue to John mentions Marcion of Sinope. All three were originally dated to the late 2nd century AD, but are now considered of uncertain date. If they are based in part on the writings of Irenaeus and Hippolytus of Rome, they must be no earlier than the 3rd century. If a 2nd-century date is correct, as Bruce thought, then the prologue to Luke is the earliest surviving text to name Luke as the author of the Acts of the Apostles (Praxeis Apostolon). It would also be the earliest text to use the title "Praxeis Apostolon".

R. G. Heard printed the Latin text of the prologues to Mark and John and the Greek of that to Luke with English translations of each. The Latin version of the prologue to Luke was a source for the later Monarchian Prologues. There is also a Coptic inscription at Asyut dating to the 6th or 7th century that appears to be based on the Lukan prologue: "As for Luke the physician, he was a disciple of the apostles. Afterwards he followed Paul. He lived 84 years. He wrote this Gospel while he was in Achaea. Later he wrote Acts."
