= William Fitzsimmons (musician) =

American musician (born 1978)

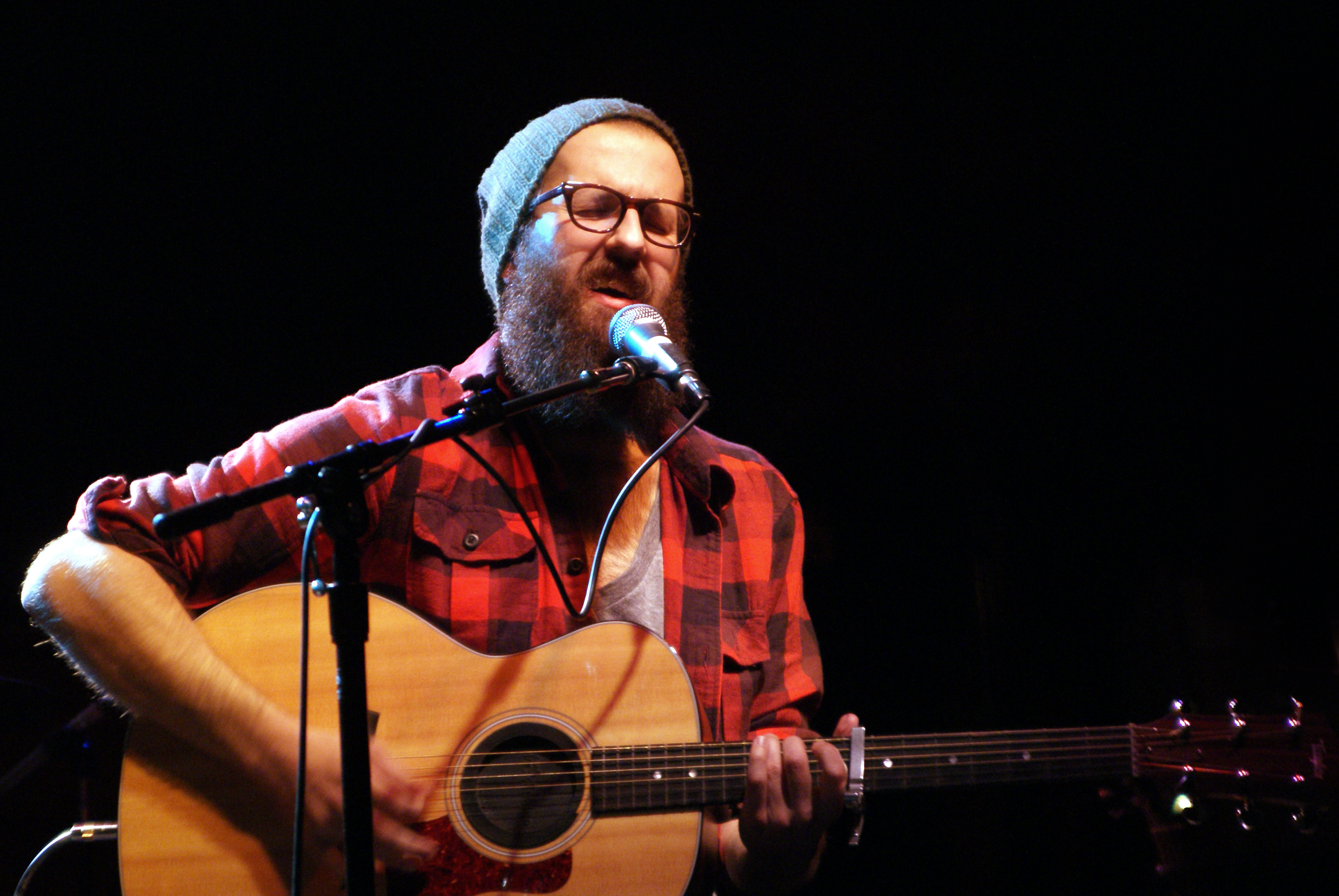
- Fitzsimmons in 2009

Background information
- Born: 1978 (age 47–48)
- Origin: Pittsburgh, Pennsylvania, US
- Genres: Folk, indie folk
- Occupation: Singer-songwriter
- Instruments: Vocals, guitar
- Years active: 2005–present
- Labels: Mercer Street
- Website: williamfitzsimmons.com

William Fitzsimmons (born 1978) is an American singer-songwriter based in Nashville, Tennessee. His music has been featured on ABC's Brothers & Sisters and the Grey's Anatomy spin-off Private Practice, MTV's Life of Ryan and Teen Wolf, the CW's One Tree Hill, CBS's Blue Bloods, ABC Family's Greek, Lifetime's Army Wives, and USA Network's Burn Notice. As of 2026, he has released nine studio albums, one EP, one live album, one remix album, and two cover albums.

== Biography ==
=== Early life and education ===
Fitzsimmons was born the youngest child of two blind parents and was raised in Pittsburgh, Pennsylvania. He is said to have developed his multiple instrumental abilities from his mother and father, both of whom were recreational musicians. His childhood home even housed a fully functional pipe organ, hand-built by his father. He was taught the piano and trombone during elementary school and began teaching himself guitar while in junior high. He is also proficient at the banjo, melodica, ukulele, and mandolin, and is known for mixing folk music with electronica in some of his production. In addition to performance abilities, Fitzsimmons is credited as the engineer and producer of his first two releases. He is often compared to contemporaries Iron & Wine, Sufjan Stevens, and Elliott Smith.

=== Career beginnings, first three albums ===
Fitzsimmons career in music came only after completing a master's degree in counseling at Geneva College and working as a mental health therapist. During a summer break in the midst of graduate school, he recorded a collection of songs on home recording equipment, which would subsequently become his debut album. Until When We Are Ghosts was released in 2005.

Fitzsimmons' writing often includes references to personal and family subject matter. His 2006 sophomore album, Goodnight, also self-produced and recorded at home, is said to have been based largely on his parents' divorce during his adolescence, and his 2008 work, The Sparrow and the Crow, his first recorded in a studio, was written entirely about and following his own divorce. Fitzsimmons revealed on the syndicated music program eTown that he recorded the album with a collaborator who he later learned was having a relationship with his wife while they were working on the recording. He stated that this caused him to delay the release of this work.

The singer's music was noticed initially largely through MySpace and touring with fellow artists Ingrid Michaelson, Brooke Fraser, and Cary Brothers, among others, and from several featured song placements on popular television programs such as Grey's Anatomy. "Hazy", a duet with Rosi Golan, was featured in Dollhouse.

=== Subsequent albums, touring ===
On February 8, 2011, Fitzsimmons released a music video for a song called "The Tide Pulls from the Moon", from his upcoming album, Gold in the Shadows. The album came out in March, and Fitzsimmons toured in Europe to promote it.

His next album, Lions, was issued on February 18, 2014.

On May 12, 2015, Fitzsimmons published the first of a pair of mini-records concerning his family, titled Pittsburgh. On April 1, 2016, he released the second of the pair, his eighth album, entitled Charleroi: Pittsburgh, Vol. 2. The record is about the grandmother he never knew—"Charleroi is the second half of the Pittsburgh story. The Pittsburgh album was about the grandmother I knew. Charleroi is about the one I never did." Fitzsimmons embarked on a European tour to support the release in April 2016, visiting nine countries along the way.

On October 21, 2016, he issued his first live album, titled William Fitzsimmons Live. It showcases songs spanning the singer's career, recorded live at performances in Chicago, Amsterdam, and Paris. The record also features a cover of Fleetwood Mac's "Everywhere", recorded live in Cologne, Germany, a video of which was published on October 19, 2016. Abby Gundersen (sister of singer-songwriter Noah Gundersen, with whom Fitzsimmons toured in 2012), is featured on violin and vocals, and additional instrumentation is contributed by Jake Philips (acoustic guitar, electric guitar, banjo, and vocals) and Adam Popick (drums, synthesizer, Rhodes, and acoustic guitar).

In 2018, Fitzsimmons released the album Mission Bell. This was followed in 2021 by Ready the Astronaut and No Promises: The Astronaut's Return. In 2022 and 2023, he published Covers, Vol. 1 and Covers, Vol. 2, respectively.

== Awards ==
- iTunes US Best Singer-Songwriter Album 2008: The Sparrow and the Crow
- iTunes Australia Best International Singer-Songwriter Album 2009: The Sparrow and the Crow
- iTunes UK Best of 2009 Singer-Songwriter: Goodnight
- Beards NOW honorable mention in the category Bushrangers Beards on non-Australians 2010
- The poster for Fitzsimmons' 2009 European tour, designed by Stefan Guzy and Björn Wiede, has been awarded for typographic excellence by the German Art Directors Club and was selected among the 100 best posters of 2009 in Germany.

== Discography ==
Until When We Are Ghosts (2005)
No.	Title	Length
1.	"Find It in Me"	6:42
2.	"Passion Play"	5:55
3.	"Candy"	4:05
4.	"When I Come Home"	4:25
5.	"Funeral Dress"	4:02
6.	"My Life Changed"	5:41
7.	"Forsake All Others"	3:10
8.	"Kylie"	7:27
9.	"Problem of Pain"	5:24
10.	"When You Were Young"	6:01
11.	"Shattered"	5:25

Goodnight (2006)
No.	Title	Length
1.	"It's Not True"	4:49
2.	"Hold on with My Open Hands"	4:10
3.	"Everything Has Changed"	4:56
4.	"Leave Me by Myself"	5:09
5.	"Please Don't Go"	6:37
6.	"You Broke My Heart"	6:36
7.	"Body for My Bed"	5:36
8.	"Never Let You Go"	4:51
9.	"I Don't Love You Anymore"	4:37
10.	"Mend Your Heart"	4:21
11.	"Goodnight" (feat. Ingrid Michaelson)	5:42
12.	"Find My Way Home"	5:46
13.	"Afterall"	7:44

The Sparrow and the Crow (2008)
No.	Title	Length
1.	"After Afterall" (feat. Caitlin Crosby)	2:48
2.	"I Don't Feel It Anymore (Song of the Sparrow)" (feat. Priscilla Ahn)	3:30
3.	"We Feel Alone"	3:05
4.	"If You Would Come Back Home" (feat. Marshall Altman)	3:51
5.	"Please Forgive Me (Song of the Crow)"	3:11
6.	"Further from You" (feat. Priscilla Ahn)	3:51
7.	"Just Not Each Other"	2:56
8.	"Even Now"	2:51
9.	"You Still Hurt Me" (feat. Priscilla Ahn)	3:24
10.	"They'll Never Take the Good Years" (feat. Caitlin Crosby)	2:47
11.	"Find Me to Forgive"	4:31
12.	"Goodmorning" (feat. Marshall Altman)	3:17
13.	"Maybe Be Alright"	3:44

Derivatives EP (2010)
No.	Title	Length
1.	"I Don't Feel It Anymore" (feat. Brooke Fraser, George Raquet remix)	5:27
2.	"If You Would Come Back Home" (Mikroboy remix)	3:34
3.	"I Don't Feel It Anymore" (feat. Brooke Fraser on most releases, but Loane in Europe & United Kingdom)	3:31
4.	"You Still Hurt Me" (feat. the Great Neck South HS Choir)	3:31
5.	"So This Is Goodbye" (Original version)	4:11
6.	"Goodmorning" (Pink Ganter remix)	4:46
7.	"So This Is Goodbye" (Pink Ganter remix)	5:04
8.	"I Kissed a Girl" (Katy Perry cover)	3:13

Gold in the Shadow (2011)
No.	Title	Length
1.	"Tide Pulls from the Moon"	3:39
2.	"Beautiful Girl"	2:38
3.	"The Winter from Her Leaving"	3:25
4.	"Fade and Then Return"	4:41
5.	"Psychasthenia"	4:14
6.	"Bird of Winter Prey"	4:01
7.	"Let You Break" (feat. Leigh Nash or Julia Stone, depending on version)	3:22
8.	"Wounded Head"	2:58
9.	"Tied to Me"	4:29
10.	"What Hold" (feat. Grace Read)	4:02
11.	"From the Water"	2:37
12.	"Blood and Bones"	2:46

Gold in the Shadow: Deluxe Edition (2011)
No.	Title	Length
1.	"Tide Pulls from the Moon"	3:39
2.	"Beautiful Girl"	2:38
3.	"The Winter from Her Leaving"	3:25
4.	"Fade and Then Return"	4:41
5.	"Psychasthenia"	4:14
6.	"Bird of Winter Prey"	4:01
7.	"Let You Break" (feat. Leigh Nash)	3:22
8.	"Wounded Head"	2:58
9.	"Tied to Me"	4:29
10.	"What Hold" (feat. Grace Read)	4:02
11.	"Bird of Winter Prey (acoustic version)"	3:33
12.	"Ever Could"	3:53
13.	"Tide Pulls from the Moon (acoustic version)"	3:21
14.	"From the Water"	2:39
15.	"Blood and Bones"	2:46
16.	"Fade and Then Return (acoustic version)"	3:39
17.	"Psychasthenia (acoustic version)"	3:25
18.	"Tied to Me (acoustic version)"	3:29
19.	"By My Side"	2:46
20.	"Gold in Shadow"	3:13

Lions (2014)
No.	Title	Length
1.	"Well Enough"	3:20
2.	"Josie's Song"	3:47
3.	"Brandon"	2:49
4.	"Took"	4:28
5.	"Fortune"	3:51
6.	"Blood / Chest"	3:22
7.	"Hold On"	3:18
8.	"Centralia"	3:29
9.	"From You"	3:16
10.	"Sister"	4:05
11.	"Lions"	4:20
12.	"Speak"	2:11
13.	"Ten Lions (bonus track)"	3:46

Pittsburgh (2015)
No.	Title	Length
1.	"I Had to Carry Her (Virginia's Song)"	3:44
2.	"Falling on My Sword"	3:42
3.	"Better"	3:46
4.	"Pittsburgh"	3:48
5.	"Beacon"	2:56
6.	"Matter"	3:28
7.	"Ghosts of Penn Hills"	4:15

Charleroi: Pittsburgh, Vol. 2 (2016)
No.	Title	Length
1.	"People Change Their Minds"	4:30
2.	"Hear Your Heart"	3:47
3.	"A Part"	4:24
4.	"Charleroi"	3:07
5.	"Fare Thee Well"	3:05
6.	"Nothing Can Be Changed"	4:09

William Fitzsimmons Live (2016)
No.	Title	Length
1.	"Hear Your Heart" (Live in Chicago)	4:05
2.	"Beautiful Girl" (Live in Chicago)	2:47
3.	"A Part" (Live in Chicago)	4:23
4.	"Nothing Can Be Changed" (Live in Chicago)	4:07
5.	"Pittsburgh" (Live in Chicago)	4:18
6.	"Fortune" (Live in Chicago)	6:12
7.	"I Don't Feel It Anymore" (Live in Chicago)	3:43
8.	"People Change Their Minds" (Live in Chicago)	4:57
9.	"Lions" (Live in Chicago)	4:19
10.	"Ghosts of Penn Hills" (Live in Chicago)	5:26
11.	"Afterall" (Live in Chicago)	6:33
12.	"Shattered" (Live in Chicago)	4:00
13.	"Everywhere" (Live in Cologne)	3:15
14.	"Hear Your Heart" (Live Acoustic Session in Amsterdam)	3:38
15.	"Passion Play" (Live in Paris)	8:18

Mission Bell (2018)
No.	Title	Length
1.	"Second Hand Smoke"	3:47
2.	"Distant Lovers"	3:24
3.	"17 + Forever"	3:50
4.	"Angela"	4:40
5.	"In the Light"	3:41
6.	"Lovely"	5:54
7.	"Never Really Mine"	3:52
8.	"Leave Her"	3:27
9.	"Wait for Me"	3:47
10.	"Afterlife"	3:39

Ready the Astronaut (2021)
No.	Title	Length
1.	"Dancing on the Sun"	3:25
2.	"No Promises"	3:39
3.	"Down with Another One"	3:08
4.	"Daedalus, My Father"	4:02
5.	"As Long as I Can Breathe"	2:31
6.	"Ready the Astronaut"	4:27
7.	"You Let Me Down"	3:43
8.	"Maybe She Will Change Her Mind"	4:56
9.	"If I Fell Back to the Earth (You Will Never Find Me)"	3:11
10.	"Icarus"	4:23
11.	"To Love Forever"	2:54

No Promises: The Astronaut's Return (2021)
No.	Title	Length
1.	"No Promises (Alternate Version)"	3:37
2.	"Heal Me Now"	3:10
3.	"Stranded"	4:19
4.	"Daedalus, My Father (Alternate Version)"	5:11
5.	"Maybe She Will Change Her Mind (Ascensionism)"	4:56
6.	"Ready the Astronaut (Alternate Version)"	3:08
7.	"Icarus (Alternate Version)"	3:54
8.	"To Love Forever (Alternate Version)"	2:45
9.	"As Long as I Can Breathe (Alternate Version)"	1:38
10.	"Down with Another One (Alternate Version)"	4:10
11.	"Dancing with the Sun (Alternate Version)"	4:14
12.	"You Let Me Down (Alternate Version)"	4:26
13.	"Down with Another One (Oehl Remix)"	3:17

Covers, Vol. 1 (2022)
No.	Title	Length
1.	"The 1" (Taylor Swift)	3:11
2.	"Love Will Tear Us Apart" (Joy Division)	3:28
3.	"The Commander Thinks Aloud" (The Long Winters)	4:14
4.	"Solsbury Hill" (Peter Gabriel)	4:39
5.	"Annie's Song" (John Denver)	2:55
6.	"Please" (Chelsea Cutler)	3:27
7.	"Futile Devices" (Sufjan Stevens)	2:25
8.	"Sweetness Follows" (R.E.M.)	3:39
9.	"Naked As We Came" (Iron & Wine)	2:47
10.	"Your Song" (Elton John)	3:24
11.	"Lovin's for Fools" (Sarah Siskind)	2:48
12.	"Smoke Signals" (Phoebe Bridgers)	4:30

Covers, Vol. 2 (2023)
No.	Title	Length
1.	"A Little Bit Yours" (JP Saxe)	3:27
2.	"Fire and Rain" (James Taylor)	3:17
3.	"King of Wishful Thinking" (Go West)	3:00
4.	"In Your Eyes" (Peter Gabriel)	4:31
5.	"Scared" (Jeremy Zucker)	3:27
6.	"Tell Her This" (Del Amitri)	3:21
7.	"Hold Me" (Fleetwood Mac)	3:13
8.	"Streets of Philadelphia" (Bruce Springsteen)	4:09
9.	"Vienna" (Billy Joel)	3:26
10.	"Sleeper 1972" (Manchester Orchestra)	3:58
11.	"Weird Fishes" (Radiohead)	4:24

Incidental Contact (2025)
No.	Title	Length
1.	"Altar"	3:38
2.	"Holding a Place for You (feat. Bre Kennedy)"	3:39
3.	"On My Radar"	4:03
4.	"Long Distance Runner"	3:11
5.	"I Know What Happens"	3:42
6.	"Call My Name"	3:02
7.	"Over You"	3:25
8.	"Incidental Contact"	4:02
9.	"I Will Not Forget You"	3:21
10.	"Back to You"	3:30
11.	"Catch You If You Fall"	3:12
12.	"Amsterdam"	3:40
13.	"Slowly Moving Cars"	4:08

Miscellaneous
No.	Title	Album / Format	Length
1.	"Heartless" (Kanye West cover)	single (2009)	4:02
2.	"Covered in Snow"	single (2009)	4:45
3.	"You Can Close Your Eyes" (James Taylor cover)	Acoustic Dreamland compilation (2011)	2:34
