= Kill Them with Kindness (Headlights album) =

Studio album by Headlights
- Released: 2006
- Recorded: 2005
- Genre: Indie rock
- Label: Polyvinyl Record Co.
- Producer: Kristian Riley, Headlights

Headlights chronology
The Most Serene Republic/Headlights (2006)	Kill Them with Kindness (2006)	Keep Your Friends and Loves Close. Keep the City You Call Home Closer (2007)

Professional ratings
Aggregate scores
Source	Rating
Metacritic	64/100
Review scores
Source	Rating
AllMusic	3.5/5 stars
Pitchfork Media	(6.7/10)

Kill Them with Kindness is the debut full-length album by indie rock band Headlights. It was released by the Polyvinyl Record Co. in 2006.

== Track listing ==
All songs written by Erin Fein / Tristan Wraight.

1. "Your Old Street" - 6:06
2. "TV" - 2:37
3. "Put Us Back Together Right" - 4:14
4. "Pity City" - 3:48
5. "Songy Darko" - 3:41
6. "Owl Eyes" - 2:50
7. "The Midwest Is the Best" - 0:18
8. "Lions" - 1:48
9. "Lullabies" - 3:44
10. "Struggle with Numbers" - 1:27
11. "Words Make You Tired" - 3:47
12. "Hi-Ya!" - 2:21
13. "Signs Point to Yes (But Outlook Not So Good)" - 3:40
14. "I Love, You Laugh" - 2:23
