= Animate Objects =

American hip hop group

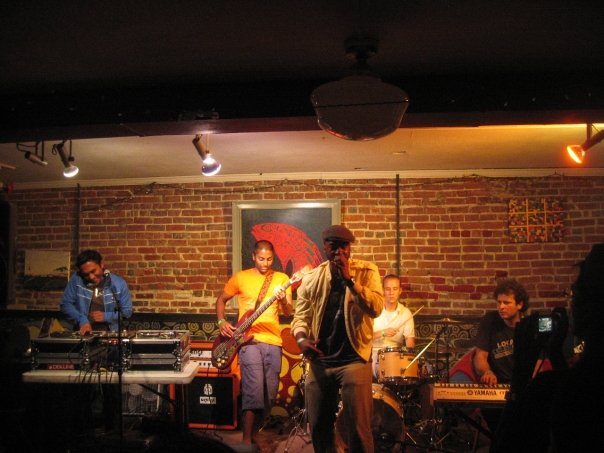
- Performing in 2008

Background information
- Origin: Champaign, Illinois, USA
- Genres: Jazz rap
- Years active: 2003 – Present
- Labels: Independent
- Members: Antar "S. Squair Blaq/CZAR Absolute" Jackson; Prashant "PV Wonder" Vallury; Aquil; Charlie Coffeen; Justin Boyd
- Past members: Steven Dobias; Brian Derstine; Alan "Wondur" Griffin; Farsheed Hamidi-Toosi; DJ Spinnerty; Michael "DJ Mabbo" Mabborang; Danya Thompson; Damian Williams; Artur "A-Dub" Wnorowski
- Website: Animate-Objects.com

Animate Objects is a United States-based live hip hop band originally formed in Champaign, Illinois in 2003. The founding members of the band, then students at the University of Illinois, were MC CZAR Absolute, drummer Farsheed Hamidi-Toosi, DJ Spinnerty, keyboardist Artur Wnorowski, guitarist Steven Dobias and bassist Prashant Vallury. In July 2004 DJ Spinnerty and Hamidi-Toosi left the band and were replaced by Michael "DJ Mabbo" Mabborang and Brian Derstine.

During October 2007 the band completed their first international tour performing at US Military Installations in Honduras and Cuba (including Guantanamo Bay Naval Base) with Armed Forces Entertainment. The band has been featured in major newspapers in the Midwest as well as featured in Billboard Magazine. Their debut album "Riding In Fast Cars With Your Momma," debuted on the CMJ Hip-Hop Adds radio chart at #2 on November 14, 2007.

== History ==
In 2003 CZAR, Hamidi-Toosi, Spinnerty, Wnorowski and Vallury were amongst the charter members of the Urbana-Champaign chapter of the Hip-Hop Congress. The current members Vallury, Steven Dobias, drummer Brian Derstine and DJ Mabbo were all members of the now defunct Chicago-based hip-hop band Peoples of Paradox.

Animate Objects was born out of a performance request. CZAR Absolute was asked to participate in the 2003 Triangle Fraternity Battle of the Bands at the University of Illinois at Urbana-Champaign. Since CZAR was a solo artist at the time he needed to put together a band in order to compete. CZAR approached Larry Gates, of the defunct Urbana-based rock band Lorenzo Goetz, in order to find a guitar player. Gates, who knew of Peoples of Paradox, suggested Vallury who was then a clerk at the independent music store Record Service. Vallury in turn referred Dobias and both were asked to come to an impromptu practice session later that night.

On September 13, 2003, after only two practices and two weeks of preparation time Animate Objects took the stage for the first time and won the Battle of the Bands.

=== 2003 - 2004 ===
The local press was quick to praise the band and they soon had a series of local shows lined up. The band’s third gig was opening for Illogic, DJ PRZM, the Opus and Soul Position (RJD2 + Blueprint). After this early series of shows the original members got together to decide whether or not they wanted to continue performing. The band decided to stay together and record an album.

Heading into 2004 the band applied to Green Street Records, also known by the acronym GSR, to have a song included on the label's first compilation CD release entitled "Emergence". Animate Objects were accepted and their song 'Flipcut', later re-recorded as 'Riding In Fast Cars With Your Momma', became track #1 on Emergence. 'Flipcut' was the band's first foray into a studio recording environment and their first time working with Pogo Studio head Mark Rubel who would later engineer much of the band's debut record.

=== 2004 - 2006 ===
The band performed a set at the 2004 University of Illinois Band Jam. A rainy day made conditions on the stage difficult but a large crowd witnessed what would be one of the band’s final performances as a Champaign-based artist.

In June 2004 the bulk of the band graduated from the University of Illinois. CZAR, Dobias and Vallury moved to Chicago. A-Dub remained in Champaign to complete his degree at the University of Illinois while Hamidi-Toosi and Spinnerty left the band to pursue solo music projects. The band reached out to Peoples of Paradox members Brian Derstine and DJ Mabbo to fill the roles of drummer and DJ an so fused the two acts together.

The first show with the new line–up was an open mic showcase at the Ice Factory which is a commune for slam poets and underground musicians.

In 2005 the band was nominated for the first ever Champaign-Urbana WPGU-Buzz Local Music Award for Best Hip-Hop band despite leaving town several months earlier. They won the award becoming the first group to hold the "Best Hip-Hop Band" trophy in Champaign.

Throughout 2005 and 2006 the band continued to refine their live performance playing shows at several Chicago venues while continuing to record material for their debut record.

=== 2007 ===
On March 31, 2007, the band released their debut album 'Riding in Fast Cars With Your Momma' at Subterranean performing with fellow Chicago hip hop band Berto Ramon and New York's Jneiro Jarel. The record, which took four years to make, marked a watershed moment in the band’s history. The record has received critical acclaim worldwide.

In October 2007 the band embarked on their first international tour. Shows in Cuba and Honduras as part of an Armed Forces Entertainment (AFE) tour introduced the band to a new fan base and gave them publicity. The tour led to the band gracing the cover of AFE's Cadence Magazine.

In November 2007 the band’s record debuted at #2 on the CMJ (College Music Journal) Hip-Hop Adds Chart, placing the record in rotation at nearly 200 radio stations across the country.

At the close of 2007 Animate Objects received their first major independent award winning 'Best Hip-Hop Song' in the 2008 Independent Music Awards for the song El Dorado.

=== 2008 ===
In March 2008 Animate Objects released their first music video for El Dorado. The release of the music video would lead to exposure for the band - resulting in several endorsement deals. Bassist Prashant Vallury would secure an endorsement deal from cabinet manufacturer Accugroove, bass amplifier manufacturer Thunderfunk, and clothing brand DesiThreads. Pianist A-Dub would also receive an endorsement from Thunderfunk Amplification. Guitarist Steven Dobias received an endorsement from Stromberg Guitars. and both Prashant Vallury and Steven Dobias would also add endorsements from Native Instruments.

Winners of the 7th annual Independent Music Awards Vox Pop vote for best Rap/Hip-Hop Song "El Dorado"

In October 2008 the band headlined a showcase at the 2008 CMJ Music Marathon at Kenny's Castaways. The showcase featured several songs off their E.P. 'Dubs, Grunts and Things'.

=== 2009 ===
On January 8, 2009, the band officially released 'Dubs, Grunts and Things', their second album. The album was the first recording to feature their new MC Aquil and features some of their last recordings with drummer Brian Derstine who had left the band a few months earlier.

2009 would see the band embark on a nationwide tour with shows ranging from California to Maine. This tour would feature a new drummer in Danya Thompson, and touring keyboardist Damian Williams. The band would spend the second half of the year preparing new material that would form the basis of its second full-length album. Thompson, Vallury, and Dobias also formed a production team named "Danya and the Fail", and began to write new material for this side project.

=== 2010 ===
In 2010 the band co-headlined the US Army's "I.A.M. Strong " tour with Universal singer Leigh Jones. The tour spanned across the continental United States and stopped at bases abroad in Germany and Italy. Following the tour the band parted ways with drummer Danya Thompson, bringing on Justin Boyd of the defunct Chicago-based group Treologic. Additionally they welcomed Charles Coffeen to their permanent lineup, with Coffeen playing keys.

Danya and the Fail released a mixtape through the band, the mixtape "The Shit" and PV Wonder released the EP "Dubs, Grunts, and Remixes". These releases featured the MCs from Animate Objects, as well as singer Marga Marion and emcee Rico Sisney of Sidewalk Chalk.

The band completed the mixing and mastering for their new album at Pressure Point Studios in Chicago, and recorded a video for their lead single "Jesse Jackson". The single was released on iTunes on 10/6/10 with the B-side "Axioms (Tribute to 12.4.06)". The album "High Notes for Low Lifes" is currently slated to be released on 11/16/10.

The band is currently planning a tour in support of their new release, writing material for the follow-up, and working on side projects.

== Awards and nominations ==
2011 Independent Music Awards, nominated for Best Hip-Hop Song for "Jesse Jackson."
2008 Independent Music Awards, for Best Hip-Hop Song ("El Dorado") 2007 Chicago Tribune/Metromix Rock N' Vote Champion
2007 Going.com Battle of the Chicago Bands Champ
2005 Independent Media Award for Best Hip-Hop Group
