= JigGsaw =

- Origin: Champaign, Illinois
- Genre: Punk rock
- Years active: 1999-2011
- Label: Playing Field Recordings

JigGsaw was a punk rock band from Champaign, Illinois. The band's most current members consists of Mark JigGsaw (vocals), Eddie Waldmire (bass guitar), Kyle Prillaman (drums), and Hayden Cler (guitar). Past members include Clint McGraw, DJ DeMoss, Neil Yaeger, and Micheal Hicks.

== History ==
JigGsaw first started as a two-piece including Clint McGraw and Mark JigGsaw who played dancey punk rock music around clubs in Champaign, Illinois. After three years of playing around the midwest, they added bassist Micheal Hicks (The Respondent) and guitarist Hayden Cler (the Junior Varsity, The Academy Is.)

In the spring of 2005, Playing Field Recordings released Zero Generation. In 2006, the band performed select dates of the Warped Tour.

JigGsaw's second CD was a self-titled EP mastered by Brian Gardner (My Chemical Romance, The Killers, Green Day); released in 2007 without a label. This release was positively reviewed by major Indie/Punk sites like Absolute Punk. This, combined with the attention created from the Warped Tour, gained the band national recognition thus earning them a mention in national press like Nylon Magazine in November 2007.

In August 2008 Clint McGraw left the band the focus on family and a new career. He was replaced by Eddie Waldmire who later went on to play bass in the band.

In June 2010 JigGsaw released their second full-length album "Vices & Virtues".

At the end of 2011 the band went separate ways to pursue different careers. Hayden Cler and Kyle Prillaman went on to form That's No Moon which is a blend of indie rock and electronica. In February 2012 Mark JigGsaw, Eddie Waldmire, and past member Clint McGraw joined up at Your Productions Studio in Barrie, Ontario to record unreleased demo songs from 2002 and 2003. In July 2012 the ten-song album The Night We Lost Our Minds was released. In 2013 Hayden Cler quit playing music and moved to Orlando for work. The music hiatus was short lived and he's played in Florida based bands LUVLOST, Suck Brick Kid, and A Hero's Fate. He currently plays guitar in Stages & Stereos.

== Discography ==
Title	Year	Label
Zero Generation	2005	Playing Field Recordings
JigGsaw	2007	(none)
Vices & Virtues	2010	(none)
The Night We Lost Our Minds	2012	(none)
