= Monarchian Prologues =

The prologue to Mark in the Drogo Gospels, a manuscript from around 850

The Monarchian Prologues are a set of Latin introductions to the four canonical gospels of Matthew, Mark, Luke and John. They were long thought to have been written in the second or third century from a Monarchian perspective, hence their name. Today they are generally regarded as Priscillianist compositions from the late fourth or early fifth century. They appear to be the work of a single author. John Chapman even concluded that they were the work of Priscillian himself, who died in 386.

The Latin style of the prologues is convoluted and difficult to understand. The prologues provide background on the traditional authors (Matthew, Mark, Luke and John) and their theological purposes. Since Luke and John were also credited with the Acts of the Apostles and the Book of Revelation, respectively, information contained in their prologues was eventually spun out into separate prologues to Acts and Revelation. The earliest manuscript with these separate prologues is the Codex Fuldensis of 541–546.

The author was working with the Old Latin Bible, since he took the order of the gospels to be Matthew, John, Luke and Mark. The prologue to Mark states that Mark used both Matthew and Luke, a theory now known as the Griesbach hypothesis. Nevertheless, the prologues were often copied into Vulgate manuscripts with the now current order of the gospels. They are in fact a standard feature in the earliest Vulgate manuscripts.

The prologues are, however, of no value as a historical source for the evangelists' backgrounds. They rely on the biblical text itself and various unreliable traditions as sources. The earlier anti-Marcionite prologue to Luke was a source, but not the other two anti-Marcionite prologues. The prologue to John appears to rely on the apocryphal Acts of John. The theology of the Monarchian Prologues is heretical by the standards of the Latin Church. Chapman argues that they spread from the Abbey of Lérins, being brought by Patrick to Ireland, by Eugippius to Italy and also to Spain. They had been brought from Italy to England by the time of Bede.

Chapman printed the Latin text with translations and commentary, acknowledging that they were "masterpieces of the art of concealing one's meaning and of not basely betraying it to the scorner". Matthew is said to have written first and in Judea. John is said to have written last and in Asia Minor. He had been the groom at the wedding at Cana who was supposedly called away by Jesus to a life of virginity. Luke was "a Syrian of Antioch by nation" who wrote in Achaia. Mark, who wrote in Italy, is said to have been a Levite who was baptised by Simon Peter. He cut off his thumb to make himself ineligible for the priesthood. The incipits (first words) of the four prologues, by which they are commonly identified are:

- Mattheus ex Iudaeis ('Matthew, who was of the Jews')
- Hic est Iohannes euangelista unus ('This is John the evangelist, one')
- Lucas Syrus natione Antiochensis ('Luke, a Syrian of Antioch by nation')
- Marcus euangelista dei ('Mark, the evangelist of God')

== Gallery ==
The beginning of the prologue to Matthew in the Codex Amiatinus

The beginning of the prologue to Luke in the Echternach Gospels

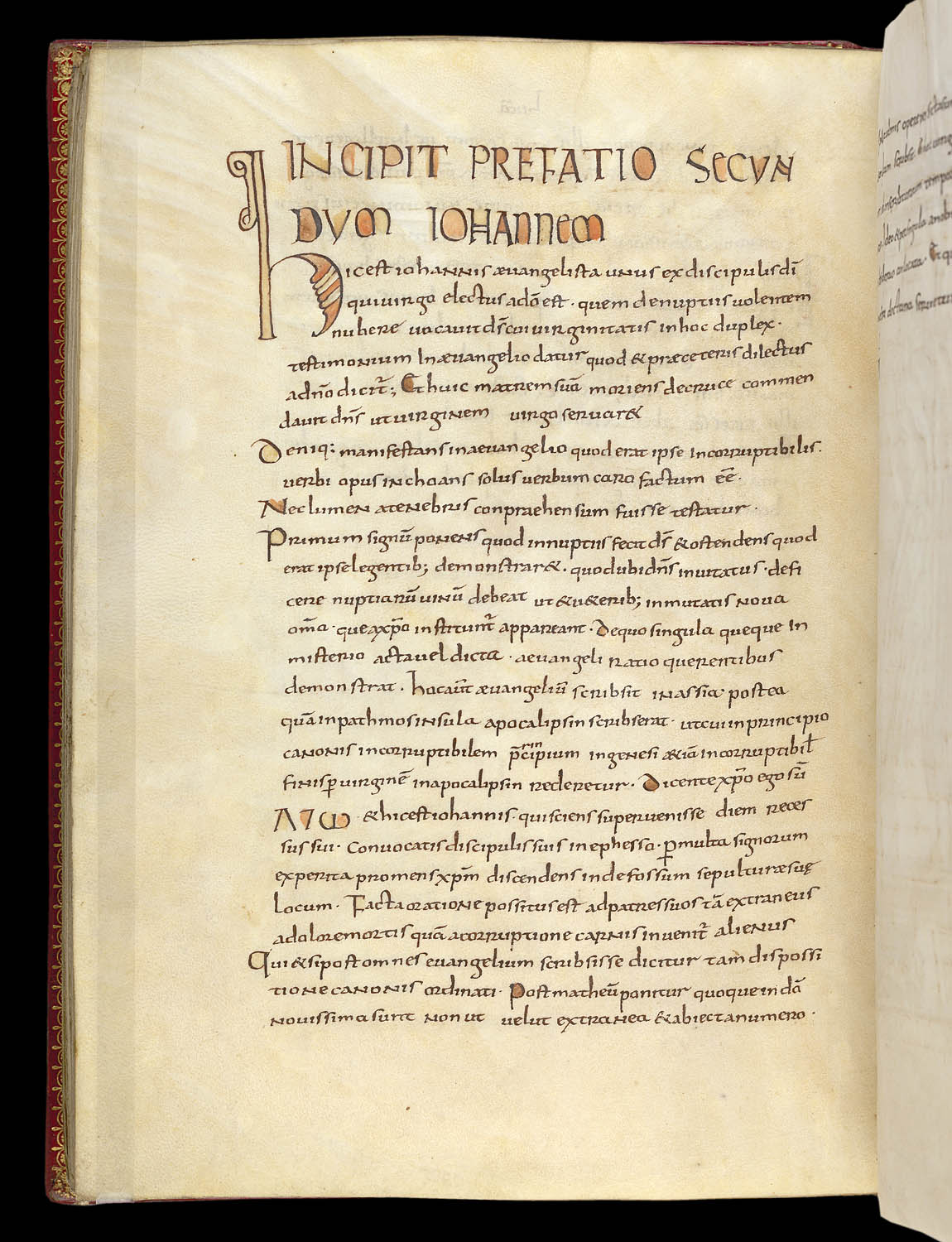
The beginning of the prologue to John in the Egerton Gospels

The beginning of the prologue to Acts in the Codex Fuldensis

The beginning of the prologue to Revelation in the La Cava Bible

== Bibliography ==
- Chapman, John (1908). Notes on the Early History of the Vulgate Gospels. Clarendon Press.
- Edwards, Mark (2022). "Monarchian Prologues". In Andrew Louth (ed.). The Oxford Dictionary of the Christian Church (4th ed.). Oxford University Press.
- Heard, R. G. (1955). "The Old Gospel Prologues". The Journal of Theological Studies. 6 (1): 1–16. doi:10.1093/jts/VI.1.1.
- Orchard, Bernard; Riley, Harold (1987). The Order of the Synoptics: Why Three Synoptic Gospels?. Mercer University Press.
