= Stefan Guzy =

German poster artist living in Berlin (born 1980)

- Born: 1980 (age 45–46); Germany
- Education: Berlin University of the Arts, Berlin
- Known for: Graphic Design, Music Video
- Notable work: José González: In Our Nature tour poster (2007); William Fitzsimmons — The Sparrow And The Crow tour poster (2009); Ruin: Half Skull album cover (2011)
- Website: Zwölf

Stefan Guzy (born 1980) is a German poster artist, typographer and manuscript researcher living in Berlin.

He graduated in visual communication at the Berlin University of the Arts in 2007, having studied with professors like Stefan Sagmeister and Daniela Haufe/Detlef Fiedler. The studio "Zwölf" which he founded 2001 with partner Björn Wiede is known for its typographical poster designs for indie rock artists like José González, William Fitzsimmons or Blonde Redhead. His work has been exhibited at several poster biennials like Toyama (2009), Lahti (2009) and Tehran (2009) among others.

In 2011 he was a selected member of the ADC 90th Annual Awards Design jury.

Together with his studio partner Björn Wiede he became a member of Alliance Graphique Internationale in 2016.

In a study published in 2022, he examined the book transactions of Emperor Rudolf II (1552–1612) and was able to identify a possible previous owner of the famous Voynich manuscript.

== Awards ==
The design work of Stefan Guzy and the studio "Zwölf" has been recognized with several international awards:

- Art Directors Club (ADC) New York — Gold Cube (2007) for "Best Poster 2007" (José González), Gold Cube (2008), and Silver Cube (2010) for "Best Package Design".
- Type Directors Club New York — Multiple Certificate of Typographic Excellence awards (including 2007, 2009, 2012, 2013, 2014, 2015, 2016).
- AIGA Annual Design Award (2007) — Annual selection for typographic excellence.
- Golden Bee Global Biennale of Graphic Design Moscow — Gold Medal (2010).
- European Design Award — Silver Medal (2009).
- Art Directors Club Germany — Silver Medal (2010).
- 100 Best Posters (Germany, Austria, Switzerland) — Multiple annual selections (including 2007, 2009, 2010, 2011, 2013, 2018, 2019, 2020).
