= G. B. Edwards =

G. B. Edwards may refer to:

- Gerald Basil Edwards (1899–1976), British author
- G. B. Edwards (arachnologist) (born 1948), American scientist

== See also ==
- Edwards (surname)
