= The Life and Times =

American indie rock band

- Origin: Kansas City, Missouri, United States
- Genres: Alternative rock, post-hardcore, space rock, shoegazing
- Years active: 2002–present
- Labels: Arena Rock Recording Company, DeSoto, 54º40' or Fight!, Stiff Slack
- Members: Allen Epley; Eric Abert; Chris Metcalf
- Past members: Rob Smith; John Meredith; Mike Meyers

The Life and Times is an American indie rock band from Kansas City, Missouri, United States, active since forming in 2002.

== History ==
Since August 2005, The Life and Times has played over 200 shows in support of their debut full-length release Suburban Hymns (DeSoto) on US tours In June 2006, they headlined a two-week tour of Spain in support of an eponymous split CD/10", both of which with urgent post-rockers from Barcelona, Nueva Vulcano (ex-Aina).

The Magician EP (Stiff Slack) is their fourth overall release. In October 2006 they headlined a successful Japanese tour in support of The Magician for Stiff Slack Records (Mercury Program, 31 Knots, Shiner, Mates of State), and then a US/Canadian excursion in November and December 2006. Domo.

Late summer 2007 the band began recording a new full-length in their own studio and in March 2008 they mixed it with Jason Livermore at the Blasting Room in Fort Collins, CO. It was announced on November 2, 2008, that the band had signed to the Portland, OR based label Arena Rock Recording Company, with whom the band released their new studio album entitled Tragic Boogie.

The band released a 7-inch vinyl EP in January 2011 called Day II b/w Day III.

In September 2011, the band announced their new album No One Loves You Like I Do will be released on January 17, 2012. They have played various new tracks in a live setting. (Day I, Day II, Day III and most recently, Day XII.)

According to the band's website, the new album will be released January 17, 2012, and will be called No One Loves You Like I Do. It will be released on the label SlimStyle.

Winter 2011, the band has decided to continue on without Rob and forge ahead as a three-piece once again according to a blog entry on the band's website. Recent shows confirm this.

== Discography ==
Studio albums

- Suburban Hymns (2005, DeSoto)
- Tragic Boogie (2009, Arena Rock)
- No One Loves You Like I Do (2012, Slimstyle Records)
- Lost Bees (2014, Slimstyle Records)
- The Life and Times (2017, Slimstyle Records)

EPs, singles, and splits

- The Flat End of the Earth (EP, 2003, 54º40' or Fight!)
- Split w/Nueva Vulcano (2006, Trece Grabaciones)
- Magician (EP, 2006, Stiff Slack)
- "Day II" b/w "Day III" (7", 2011 Hawthorne Street)
- Doppelgängers (EP, 2016)
