= The Beauty Shop (band) =

Americana rock band

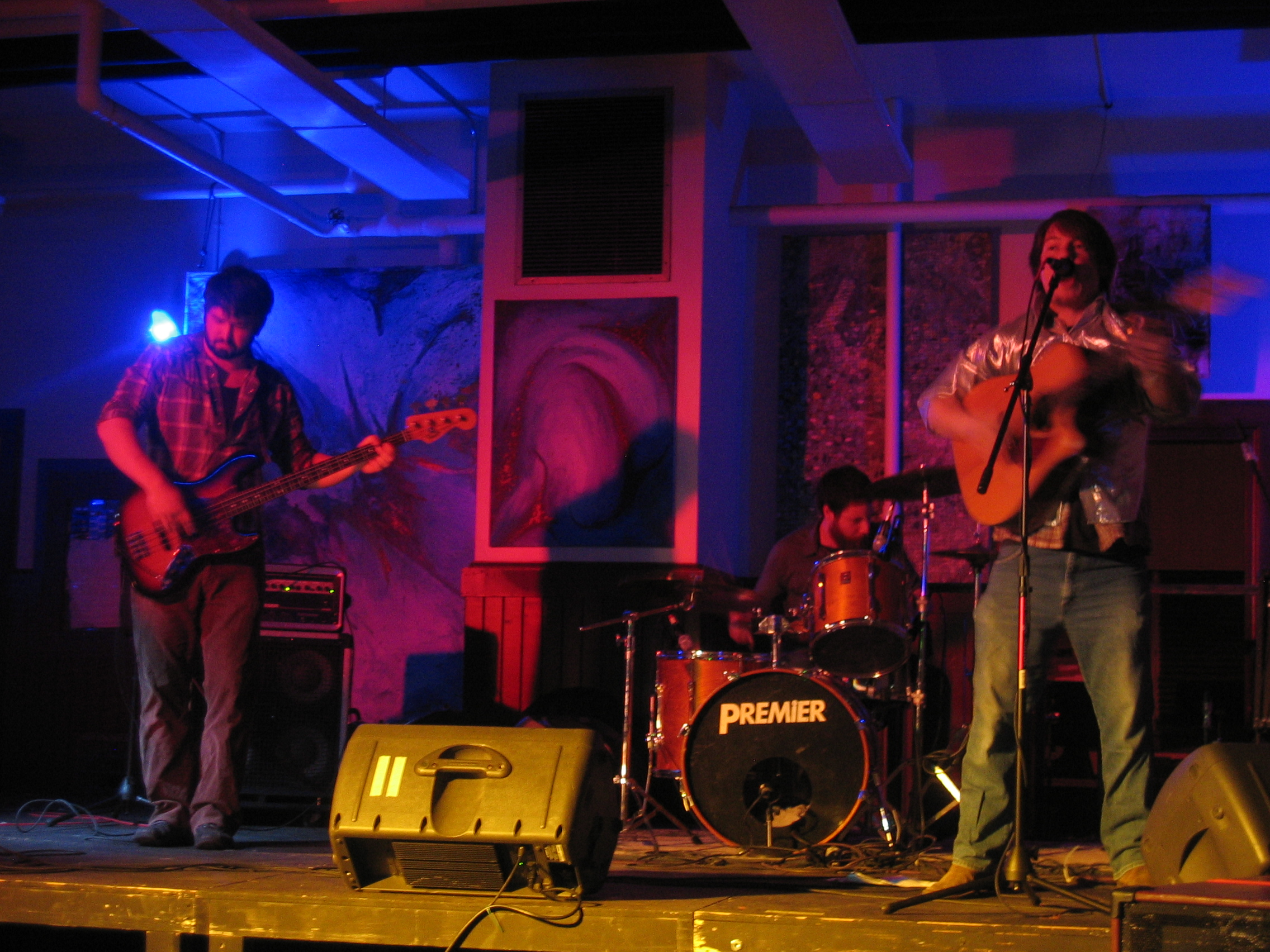
- The Beauty Shop in 2007

Background information
- Origin: Champaign, Illinois, United States
- Genres: Americana; Alternative rock; Alternative country
- Years active: 1999–2008, 2016
- Labels: Parasol Records; Shoeshine Records; Snapper Records
- Past members: John Hoeffleur (vocals, guitar) (1999–2008); Casey Smith (drums) (1999–2001); Ariane Peralta (bass) (2000–2006); Joe Martin (drums) (2002); Steve Lamos (drums) (2004); Brett Sanderson (drums) (2004–2005); Ben Ucherek (drums) (2005–2008); Eric Fisher (bass) (2006–2008)

The Beauty Shop was an Americana rock / alt country band, led by singer-songwriter-guitarist John Hoeffleur, based out of Champaign, Illinois. Formed in 1999, they released two EPs and two full-length albums before disbanding in 2008. Hoeffleur described their music as "influenced by old-school punk (Wire, Minutemen, Misfits) and old-school country (Hank, Lefty, Patsy, Johnny) with a dash of singer/songwriter (Leonard Cohen, Nick Drake)".

== History ==
The Beauty Shop was formed by John Hoeffleur and drummer Casey Smith in 1999, in Champaign, Illinois. Hoeffleur (b. Arlington Heights, Illinois, November 26, 1977) grew up in the suburbs of Chicago, and graduated from the University of Illinois. He had previously played with local band The Blackouts, and on his own playing in local coffee shops.

The duo's first release was The Grief EP, a self-released limited edition recorded in Smith's home, which they sold at local concerts. The EP caught the eye of the Urbana, Illinois-based record label Parasol Records, who signed the band to produce an album. At the same time, the band put out hand-written ads for a bassist, and recruited Ariane Peralta. The band released their first album Yr. Money or Yr. Life in October 2000. The album garnered many positive critical reviews, and the band attracted a growing audience at its live performances, boosted when they opened at the last minute for The Violent Femmes in Champaign. According to one reviewer, "the unsettling cover art reflected the bleakness of Hoeffleur's lyrical vision … spinning tales of dysfunctional characters drawn into seemingly terminal decline."

In August 2001, Smith left the band, and Hoeffleur played several solo shows before he and Peralta recruited drummer Joe Martin in early 2002. By that time, the album had been licensed to Shoeshine Records in Scotland, who released it in the UK. Shoeshine also released a limited-edition 7" single of "Death March", the single from Yr. Money or Yr. Life. The band toured across the UK in July 2002 to promote the album's release, again gaining critical acclaim. However, they then took a second hiatus after Martin left, with Hoeffleur playing solo shows in the UK, and Peralta concentrating on school.

The Beauty Shop reformed in 2004 to record a second album, Crisis Helpline, with drummer Steve Lamos. In July 2004 they returned to live performance in the United States, with drummer Brett Sanderson, of The Blackouts. Crisis Helpline was released in Europe in September 2004, the record company concentrating on seeking to break the band there first. They also released a 7" and CD single, "Monster", which enjoyed considerable airplay on BBC 6 in the UK. A second single, "Rumplestiltskin Lives", was released to UK radio stations in spring 2005.

The band then signed to Bryan Morrisson's label, Snapper Records, in summer 2005. The label released two further singles in the UK, Paper Hearts for Josie (August 2005) and A Desperate Cry for Help (October 2005). New drummer Ben Ucherek replaced Sanderson for the filming of the video for "A Desperate Cry for Help". In April 2006, they released a hybrid album of the best tracks from their previous releases, Yard Sale.

Their song "I Got Issues" was listed in Maxim magazine as "the #4 Song to download if you're missing Johnny Cash". They often include cover songs as B-sides. Their single release Monster includes a cover of the Misfits' "Hybrid Moments", Paper Hearts for Josie included The Pixies' "Gouge Away", A Desperate Cry for Help contained Judas Priest's "Breaking the Law", and Death March featured a cover of Depeche Mode's "Personal Jesus". The band often played at The Great Cover-up, an annual Champaign-Urbana based charity show.

Bassist Ariane Peralta left in late 2006 to pursue a PhD at university. She was replaced by Eric Fisher, formerly of the band Lorenzo Goetz.

In October 2007, the band released a new EP, Just Some Demos, on their own label. The Beauty Shop disbanded in the summer of 2008 with the departure of Eric Fisher to Oregon and Ben Ucherek focusing his time on his new band Golden Quality. The band played its final show on June 6, 2008, at the Canopy Club in Urbana, Illinois. In late 2008, after the group disbanded, a new song entitled NuFuture was released on their MySpace page. The band's final demos were given a digital-only release as Just Some More Demos in January 2009.

In mid-2009, Hoeffleur formed a new band, Heyokas, with Kelly McMorris (keyboards), Marc Turner (bass), and Jesse Greenlee (drums).

With a line-up of Hoeffleur, Peralta and Ucherek, the Beauty Shop reformed for a one-off show in Champaign-Urbana in January 2016.

== Discography ==
=== Major releases ===
- Grief EP – Fall 1999
- Yr. Money or Yr. Life (US) – October 2000 – Parasol Records
- Yr. Money or Yr. Life (UK) – March 2002 – Shoeshine Records
- Crisis Helpline (UK) – September 27, 2004 – Shoeshine Records
- Yard Sale (UK) – March 27, 2006 – Snapper Music/Shoeshine Records
- Just Some Demos EP – October 2007
- Just Some More Demos EP – January 2009

=== Singles / Misc. ===
- Parasol's Sweet Sixteen, Vol. 2 (contributed "Death March")
- Parasol's Sweet Sixteen, Vol. 3 (contributed "Personal Jesus")
- Death March – 7" Vinyl (UK) – March 2002 – Shoeshine Records
- Monster – 7" Vinyl & CD (UK) – September 27, 2004 – Snapper Music/Shoeshine Records
- Stuck in the Chimney – Various Artists (contributed "Christmas @ Friedrich's") (as John Hoeffleur)
- Paper Hearts for Josie – CD (UK) – August 29, 2005 – Snapper Music/Shoeshine Records
- A Desperate Cry for Help – CD (UK) – October 31, 2005 – Snapper Music/Shoeshine Records
- Monster – April 2006 – Believe
