= Gospel Book (British Library, MS Egerton 768) =

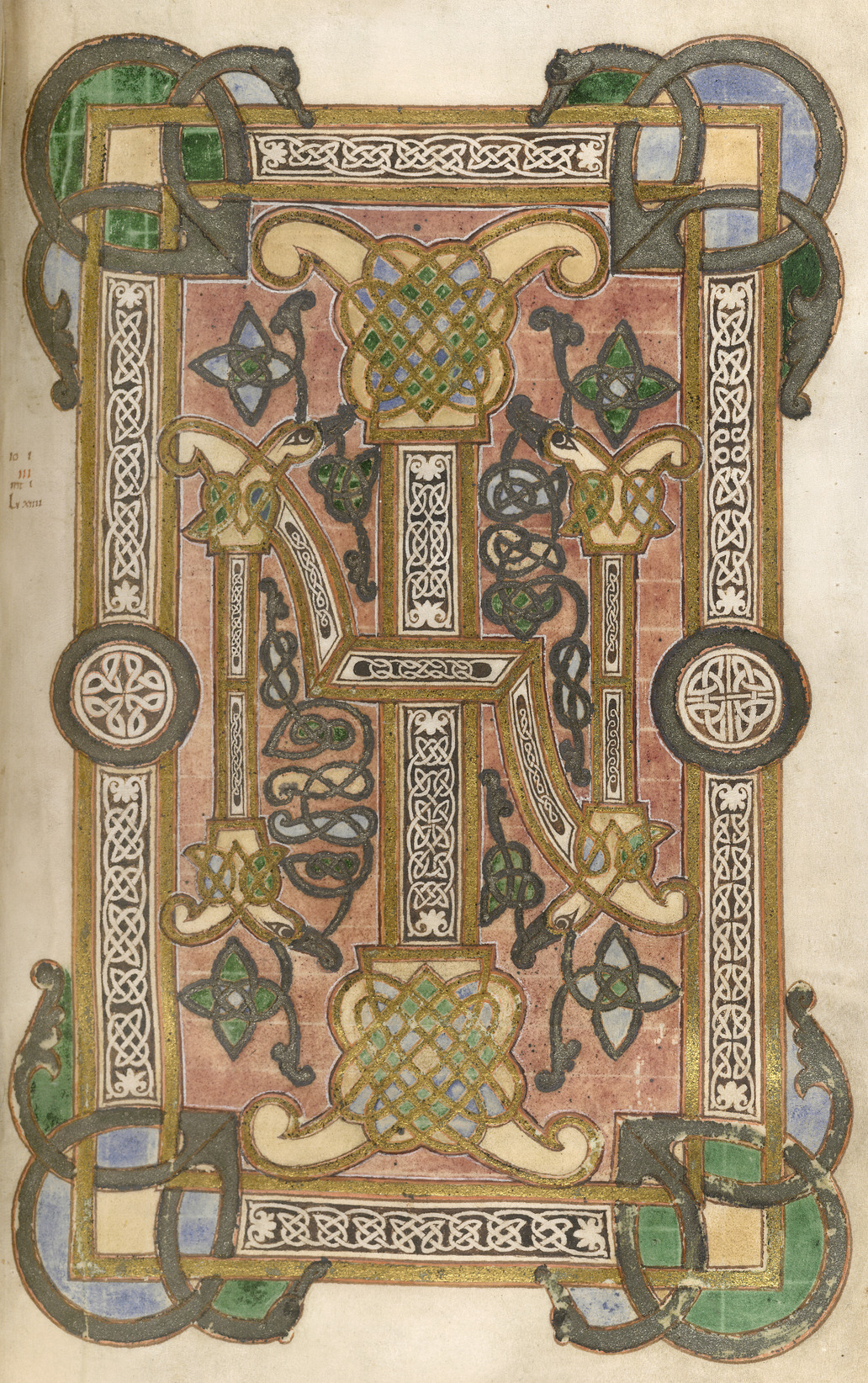
Folio 63v, Incipit to the Gospel of John.

Egerton MS 768, British Library, London is an illuminated Gospel Book in Latin produced in Northern France during the mid-9th century. It contains the Gospels of Luke and John. The manuscript 's decoration includes lavish two page incipits which are decorated with interlace patterns for each Gospel. It was purchased by the British Library by means of the Egerton Fund established by Francis Henry Egerton, 8th Earl of Bridgewater and forms part of the Egerton Collection.

== See also ==
- List of New Testament Latin manuscripts
