= Evangelicals (band) =

American indie rock band

- Origin: Norman, Oklahoma, U.S.
- Genres: Indie rock
- Years active: 2004-present
- Labels: Dead Oceans Records
- Members: Josh Jones; Kyle Davis; Austin Stephens; Todd Jackson

Evangelicals are an indie rock band from Norman, Oklahoma. Currently there are four members of the group: Josh Jones (lead vocals, guitar), Kyle Davis (bass guitar, keyboards), Austin Stephens (drums) and Todd Jackson (guitar). Their music is renowned for its energy and unabashed enthusiasm. Their 2006 debut album, So Gone issued by Misra Records, received an 8.1/10 score from Pitchfork Media. They are currently signed to Dead Oceans Records. In January 2008 they released The Evening Descends, which scored 8.3 from Pitchfork.

== Discography ==
=== Albums ===
- So Gone - Misra, 2006
- The Evening Descends - Dead Oceans, 2008
