= Parasol's Sweet Sixteen =

Compilation album series

Parasol's Sweet Sixteen is a compilation album series release by American record label and distributor Parasol Records, compiling new and previously released songs by artists on their subsidiary and distributed labels Action Musik, Bird Song Recordings, Galaxy Gramophone, Hidden Agenda Records, Mud Records, Reaction Recordings, and Spur Records. The series has received several positive reviews from critics.

== Volume 1 (2000) ==
1. Starlet – "Diary & Herself" (Starlet) – 3:13 (also released on Find Me (Odyssey to Anyoona), Parasol)
2. June & The Exit Wounds – "I Can See You" (Todd Fletcher) – 4:30 (also released on a bonus 7" with the LP edition of A Little More Haven Hamilton, Please, Parasol)
3. White Town – "I'm Alone" (Jyoti Mishra) – 2:16 (also released on All My Love / Rise, Parasol)
4. Quickspace – "Coca Lola" (Tom Cullinan) – 5:48 (also released on Precious Falling, Hidden Agenda)
5. Elk City – "Dreams of Steam" (Ray Ketchem, Peter Langland-Hassan, and Renee LoBue) – 2:49 (also released on Status, Hidden Agenda)
6. Very Secretary – "Sister Psyche" (Very Secretary) – 3:30 (also released on Standing in the Shade, Mud)
7. blueberry, very blue – "The Mongolian Air Blue" – 3:32 (subsequently released on Step Right This Way, Parasol)
8. St. Christopher – "Chemical King" (Glenn Melia) – 3:23 (also released on Golden Blue, Parasol)
9. George Usher Group – Days of Plenty" (Usher) – 3:55 (also released on Days of Plenty, Parasol)
10. Matt Bruno – "Dancing" (Bruno) – 3:22 (also released on Punch & Beauty, Parasol)
11. Autoliner – "Ambulance" (Tom Curless, Brian Leach, and John Ross) – 3:10 (also released on Life on Mars, Parasol)
12. Nick Rudd – "One Track Mind" (Rudd) – 2:28 (also released on One Track Mind, Parasol)
13. Steve Pride and His Blood Kin – "Emmanuel" – 4:34 (also released on Pride on Pride, Spur)
14. Bikeride – "Jennifer" (Tony Carbone) – 2:50 (also released on Thirty-Seven Secrets I Only Told America and the 10" Dogs EP, Hidden Agenda)
15. Busytoby – "Hey Hali" (Amanda Lyons and Joe Ziemba) – 2:12 (also released on It's Good to Be Alive, Parasol)
16. Doleful Lions – "Driller Killer" (Jonathan Scott) – 3:35 (also released on The Rats Are Coming! The Werewolves Are Here!, Parasol)
17. Vitesse – "Losing Track of Time" (Hewson Chen and Joshua Klein) – 3:48 (previously unreleased, Hidden Agenda)
18. Honcho Overload – "Miserable" (Honcho Overload) – 3:52 (also released on Smiles Everyone, Mud)

Editors at AllMusic Guide rated this release three out of five stars, with critic Stanton Swihart calling it a collection that "serves as proof enough that this is ground well worth treading" and a sampler that "is packed to the gills with sensational music from across the pop spectrum". David Fufkin of PopMatters wrote that Parasol is a great label due to its strong roster of artists and quality songs and recommends that readers buy the compilation for its high quality and low price.

== Volume 2 (2000) ==
1. Bettie Serveert – "Unsound" (lyrics: Carol van Dijk, music: Bette Serveert) – 3:59 (an edited single version unavailable in the United States)
2. Angie Heaton and Bob Kimbell – "Ever Fallen In Love? (Pete Shelley) – 2:51 (previously unreleased)
3. Sarge – "Detroit Star-Lite" (Elizabeth Elmore) – 3:29 (also released on Distant)
4. Diamond Star Halo – "The Sky Is Falling" (Bob Kimbell, Brian Leach, and Adam Schmitt) – 4:33 (previously unreleased)
5. Mike Levy – "Away from My Head" (Levy) – 2:48 (also released on Fireflies)
6. National Skyline – "Eurorak" (National Skyline) – 3:45 (previously unreleased)
7. Elk City – "Love's Like a Bomb" (Ray Ketchem, Peter Langland-Hassan, and Renee LoBue) – 4:38 (also released on Status)
8. Vitesse – "When Nothing's Changed" (Hewson Chen and Joshua Klein) – 3:29 (also released on Chelsea 27099)
9. Doleful Lions – "Breather Bulls" (Jonathan Scott) – 4:46 (also released on Song Cyclops Volume One)
10. Friends of Sound – "Manhattan" (Leslie Lochamy and Reed Lochamy) – 4:35 (also released on Think It's a Game)
11. Bikeride – "Look Out, Here Comes Tomorrow" (Neil Diamond) – 2:48 (previously unreleased)
12. Autoliner – "Outdoor Miner" (Graham Lewis and Colin Newman) – 2:25 (previously unreleased)
13. Shalini – "Pandora at Sea" (Shalini Chatterjee) – 2:45 (also released on We Want Jelly Donuts)
14. Busytoby – "The Loneliest Life" (Amanda Lyons and Joe Ziemba) – 3:35 (also released on the sampler included with the Spring 2000 issue of Innocence + Peppermints)
15. The Beauty Shop – "Death March" (John Hoffleur) – 4:05 (also released on Yr Money or Yr Life)
16. Philo – "Last Dart Leaving (Down)" (Jeff Cohen, Johnny Nickels, and Chris Russell) – 2:46 (also released on The Trouble with Girls)
17. Toothpaste 2000 – "Delicious" (Frank Bednash and Donna Esposito) – 4:32 (previously unreleased remix)

Editors at AllMusic Guide rated this release three out of five stars, with reviewer Stephen Cramer calling it "an eclectic mix of some of indie's lesser-known shining stars".

== Volume 3 (2001) ==
Editors at AllMusic Guide rated this release three out of five stars, with critic Jason Ankeny praising the diverse roster on Parasol displayed here, writing that the label "ranks among America's most consistently interesting independent labels, continually moving beyond the company's indie pop roots to encompass an impressive breadth of sensibilities from neo-psychedelia to alternative country to synth pop".

== Volume 4 (2001) ==
Editors at AllMusic Guide rated this release 3.5 out of five stars, with writer Stewart Mason calling Parasol "one of the biggest and best indie pop labels in America" and criticizing earlier volumes for being too cautious with track selection, an issue solved here and also opining that "these 20 tracks flow together much better than the haphazardly sequenced earlier volumes in the series", summing up that this is the "first essential volume in this series". Writing for PopMatters, Patrick Schabe writing that "Parasol and company prove with this sampler why they're at the top of the game when it comes to supporting the best of the best in indie pop", with an excellent selection of tracks, but opining that "the track ordering there is a decided slump towards the end of the disc".

== Volume 5 (2002) ==
Editors at AllMusic Guide rated this release four out of five stars, with reviewer Johnny Loftus calling it "heavy on tasteful chamber and indie pop", with several standout tracks; he ultimately recommends the album to long-time fans of the label as well as anyone interested in finding new indie pop.

== Volume 6 (2003) ==
Editors at AllMusic Guide rated this release three out of five stars, with critic Richie Unterberger writing that "although there's a lot of variety, there's not much of a consistent sound or approach, other than generally falling under the umbrella of early 21st century indie pop" and characterizing the album as "pleasant, mildly quirky, guitar-oriented indie pop, often with echoes of vintage greats like the Kinks and the Beach Boys" that could be appropriate for college radio. Writing for PopMatters, Christine Di Bella opines that "for the most part, this collection lives up to Parasol's reputation for doing the time warp, with some notable exceptions", but noting that even with the weaker tracks, the compilation "still [has] a pretty good win/loss percentage".

== Volume 7 (2003) ==
Editors at AllMusic Guide rated this release three out of five stars, with critic Richie Unterberger casting the release as "a wide-ranging label sampler, without much uniting the selections save the companies to which the artists were signed" and calls this compilation "pretty acceptable listening, and good fodder for something obscure to add to a college radio play list, but there's not much in the way of standout tunes". Patrick Schabe of PopMatters considering the general quality of Parasol's samplers as high, and writing that this edition "neither surprises nor disappoints in its offerings" that "doesn't really show the Parasol group breaking ground into any vastly new territories, it adds further weight to Parasol's solidified place at the center of indie pop in the US and abroad"; he recommends the album for anyone interested in indie pop.

== Volume 8 (2005) ==
Editors at AllMusic Guide rated this release 3.5 out of five stars, with critic Richie Unterberger writing that "while it's not easy to generalize about a lengthy anthology of cuts from 20 different groups on a variety of labels", the sampler tends toward indie pop that pays homage to many 1960s and 1970s influences and speculates if "many listeners' tastes are wide enough to enjoy this as a start-to-finish experience in one gulp", but praising the "commendable level of variety".

== See also ==
- List of 2000 albums
- List of 2001 albums
- List of 2002 albums
- List of 2003 albums
- List of 2005 albums
