= RTFM (disambiguation) =

RTFM is the expression "Read the fucking manual".

RTFM may also refer to:

- RT FAQ Manager, a knowledge base application Request Tracker
- Ray Tracing Figure of Merit, often used in the context of ray tracing or BRL-CAD
- RTFM (album), an album by Poster Children

== See also ==
- RTM (disambiguation)
