= Sun Eater (disambiguation) =

Sun Eater or The Sun Eater may refer to:

- Sun Eater, 2014 album by Job for a Cowboy
- The Sun Eater, science fiction novel series by Christopher Ruocchio
- "The Sun Eater", 2025 tour of death metal band Obscura
- "Sun Eater", track from the 2021 Sumo Cyco album Initiation
- "Sun//Eater", song from the 2022 Lorna Shore album Pain Remains
- Sun Eater, record label founded by Indonesian singer and record producer Hindia
- Sun Eater, 2020 comic book by actor Dylan Sprouse
- Sun-Eaters (DC Comics), a cloud-like, star-devouring species featured in DC Comics

== See also ==
- Suneaters, American rock band
- Sin-eater (disambiguation)
