= Strell =

Strell is a surname. Notable people with the surname include:

- Inge Strell (born 1947), Austrian figure skater
- Joe Strell, American musician

== See also ==
- Stell (surname)
