= If You See Kay =

English profanity phrase

"If You See Kay" is a phrase which can be heard as spelling out of the swear word fuck. It was first used by James Joyce in his 1922 novel Ulysses:

If you see kay
Tell him he may
See you in tea
Tell him from me.

"If You See Kay" has been used multiple times as a song title by the following artists:

- Memphis Slim, 1963
- R. Stevie Moore, 1977
- April Wine, on the 1982 album Power Play
- Poster Children, on the 1991 album Daisychain Reaction
- Turbonegro, on the 2005 album Party Animals
- The Script, on the 2008 album The Script

== See also ==
- "Foxtrot Uniform Charlie Kilo", a 2005 song by the Bloodhound Gang
- "If U Seek Amy", a 2009 song by Britney Spears
