= Stelly =

Stelly is a surname. Notable people with the surname include:

- Joel Stelly (born 1984), American football player
- Vic Stelly (1941–2020), American businessman and politician

== See also ==
- Stell (surname)
