= Henry Frayne =

Henry Frayne may refer to:

- Henry Frayne (musician) (born 1965), Irish-American musician
- Henry Frayne (athlete) (born 1990), Australian track and field athlete
