= Lotuspool Records =

American independent record label

Lotsupool Records
- Founded: 1992
- Founder: Chris Garibaldi, Matt Hyde
- Genre: Alternative rock, indie rock, post-hardcore
- Country of origin: United States
- Location: Kansas City, Missouri
- Official website: www.lotuspool.com

Lotuspool Records is an American independent record label formed in 1992 in Lawrence, Kansas by musicians Chris Garibaldi and Matt Hyde. The company was named after a horse Garibaldi and Hyde bet on when having a business meeting on the lawn of Arlington National Raceway. Lotuspool's stable of artists includes Zoom, Panel Donor, Bully Pulpit, Suneaters, and The Weightmen. In 2012, the year of Lotuspool's 20th anniversary, Lotuspool moved to change music distribution by offering all Lotuspool albums for free download and streaming.

== History ==
=== Early years ===
On July 7, 1992, Lyons Township High School graduates, Chris Garibaldi and Matt Hyde went to Arlington National Raceway to discuss the prospect of starting a record label to release the music of their high school friend Mark Henning, frontman of the band, Zoom. With their remaining seven dollars, Garibaldi and Hyde placed a bet on the seventh horse in the seventh race. The horse, Lotuspool came in at 21 to 1 odds and the winnings funded an evening of steak, imported beer, and merriment. During the victory dinner, Hyde suggested the label be named after their equine benefactor. Garibaldi seconded the motion.

That winter, Garibaldi and Hyde moved to Lawrence, Kansas to start the label and focus on the thriving local Lawrence music scene. Lotuspool then released a Zoom 7” and Zoom’s self-titled debut album. They ran Lotuspool headquarters from the farmhouse of a 238-acre farm, which was one of the largest dairy farms in Kansas back in the 1960s. The dairy facility and barn were both out of commission during the Lotuspool days, but the label put both structures for use during some of the recording sessions held on the farm.

=== Sole proprietorship ===
In 1994, it was apparent to both Garibaldi and Hyde that their respective interests related to Lotuspool were at different levels. The two amicably split leaving Garibaldi as the sole owner of Lotuspool.

Hyde and Garibaldi continue to be close friends. Hyde is now the owner of 715, a Lawrence, Kansas restaurant with meat-centric cuisine and an upscale ambiance.

=== Early success ===
Lotuspool thrived in its early years, releasing a 20 band compilation, “Feast of the Sybarites”, two Panel Donor records, a Bully Pulpit 7”, and a Bully Pulpit full-length CD. During this time John Peel became a Lotuspool fan; Zoom and Panel Donor were signed to larger labels; Lotuspool became one of the first 10 labels on the internet as they joined the Internet Underground Music Archive (IUMA); Lotuspool was pursued for acquisition by three major labels; and the Lotuspool ownership struck up an alliance with James Grauerholz and the author William S. Burroughs. The alliance mostly centered on a mutual love of firearms and the loose shooting restrictions associated with the Lotuspool farm zoning, but in addition, Grauerholz was a generous friend to Lotuspool. He produced the initial Panel Donor record with Matt Nalbach and was very generous when it came to Lotuspool borrowing his recording equipment for Bully Pulpit records. Grauerholz would eventually become a Lotuspool recording artist himself when he released his musical anthology, "Life's Too Good To Keep" on Lotuspool in 2024.

=== Rebirth ===
In 2011, Lotuspool revived itself by releasing all Lotuspool albums for online consumption. In addition, Lotuspool started working to license and release more music. In October, 2011, Lotuspool released Suneaters first album, “Suneaters I”. Furthermore, Lotuspool made an aggressive move to change the music industry paradigm by posting all of its albums for free download and streaming. Free Music: Listeners First! Bands Next! Labels Last! While SOPA and PIPA had been held at bay, Lotuspool was not going to stand idly by and wait for the next attack on a listener’s right to download music and share it for free. Lotuspool now has an expansive online presence where Lotuspool music can be purchased or enjoyed free.

== Catalog ==
- Bully Pulpit
- Chris Cardwell
- Heidi Gluck
- Hollow Body
- James Grauerholz
- June Henry
- Krafty LoveLordz
- Mild 7
- Panel Donor
- Poster Children
- Suneaters
- The Bump Band
- The Whips
- Voice of Action
- Zoom
