= No More Songs About Sleep and Fire =

Studio album by Poster Children
- Released: January 27, 2004
- Genre: Alternative rock
- Length: 37:08
- Label: Hidden Agenda

Poster Children chronology
DDD (2000)	No More Songs About Sleep and Fire (2004)	On the Offensive (2004)

Professional ratings
Review scores
Source	Rating
AllMusic	4/5 stars
Pitchfork	7.6/10
Tiny Mix Tapes	2.5/5 stars

No More Songs About Sleep and Fire is the eighth album by American alternative rock band Poster Children, released in 2004. The version released on enhanced CD-ROM features a layered front cover design, and is enhanced with the video for "Western Springs." The CD-ROM also features an album-length commentary track. The vinyl issue includes an exclusive lyric sheet.

== Critical reception ==
The Chicago Tribune called the album "a ferocious, ticked-off expression of energy and commitment renewed."

== Track listing ==
1. "Jane" – 2:13
2. "Western Springs" – 2:49
3. "Sugarfriend" – 2:34
4. "Flag" – 2:48
5. "Shy" – 2:17
6. "The Floor" – 3:33
7. "The Leader" – 3:17
8. "Now It's Gone" – 3:21
9. "Different & Special Things" – 2:51
10. "The Bottle" – 4:10
11. "Hollywood, Pt. II" – 3:18
12. "Midnite Son" – 3:57

== Personnel ==
- Rick Valentin – Vocals, Guitar
- Rose Marshack – Bass, vocals
- Jim Valentin – Guitar
- Matt Friscia – Drums
