= Joe Strell =

American bass player and songwriter

- Origin: Chicago, Illinois, United States
- Genres: Folk, rock
- Years active: 1979-Current
- Labels: Dansbane Elandet
- Website: http://www.joestrell.com/

Joe Strell is an American bass player and songwriter. He was a member of The Imports (1980–81) and ¡Ack-Ack! (1984–86). In 1986 he founded Dansbane Eländet recording studios and began releasing cassette albums under the name Split Heavens.

== Biography ==
=== The Imports ===
Joe Strell began his musical career in 1980 as songwriter and bassist for The Imports, one of Chicago's first punk rock / post punk bands, which was named after their favorite section in the Wax Trax record bins. The Imports entertained local audiences with their dark minimalism, playing in alternative dance clubs including Ann Arkees, Tuts, Ruts, Waves, Gaspar's, Huey's, Jamie's Elsewhere, and the Lucky Number. The final lineup of The Imports consisted of Ben Krug (vocals), Tom Krug (guitar), Joe Strell (bass), and Tom Wall (drums).

The Imports released a 7" vinyl single on Cirkle Records which remains an obscure cult favorite and has gone through multiple printings. For their penultimate show on December 4, 1980, they opened for The Jim Carroll Band at Sam's (later known as First Avenue) in Minneapolis, and headlined the next evening at the neighboring 7th Street Entry.

=== ¡Ack-Ack! ===
In the fall of 1981 Strell left Chicago for Champaign, Illinois, where he eventually joined up with the new wave music / art rock band ¡Ack-Ack! in 1984. This band, known for its eclectic compositions, released 7" and 12" singles and contributed to a number of cassette compilations on the small, independent Office Records label. Playing regularly in local clubs, Strell developed a talent for melodic Rickenbacker bass lines that became his trademark. The lineup for ¡Ack-Ack! consisted of Steve Shields (vocals), Lynn Canfield (keyboards), Henry Frayne (guitar), Joe Strell (bass), and Brendan Gamble (drums). Previous band members also included Tim Stephens (guitar) and Brian Reedy (drums), who went on to form the alternative trio Lonely Trailer.

=== Split Heavens ===
In 1986, while still playing bass for ¡Ack-Ack!, Strell established Dansbane Eländet Studios, and adopted the name of Split Heavens, which he used in many of his solo and collaborative efforts over the next two decades. Strell also contributed as bassist to recordings by The Arms of Someone New, TX St Mexico, and Club Crack. He also produced recordings for Club Crack, and engineered and produced several recordings for Lonely Trailer that were later released on Mud Records.

=== Sylvia Darling ===
When ¡Ack-Ack! broke up in the winter of 1986, bassist Strell and drummer Brendan Gamble worked together on a studio project they called Sylvia Darling, culminating in the release of the album-length cassette Sand Dancing (1988) on Office Records. This collaboration lasted until 1989, when Strell left Champaign to move to New York City. Meanwhile, fellow ¡Ack-Ack! alumni Henry Frayne, Lynn Canfield and Brendan Gamble formed The Moon Seven Times (M7X), whose debut CD release on Third Mind Records featured Joe Strell on bass on the track "Rise", as well as a credit for "train sounds and glasses". Henry Frayne later went on to form his own musical project Lanterna, while Lynn Canfield and Brendan Gamble created Shotgun Wedding.

=== Solo career ===
After leaving New York in May 1995, Strell moved to San Francisco where he re-established the Dansbane Elandet recording studio and record label, on which he has released a number of solo albums. Joe Strell is still active as of 2007.

== Discography ==
- In the Balance, Joe Strell (2007), Dansbane Elandet DEI-CAT-003
- Enormous Morning, Joe Strell (2006), Dansbane Elandet DEI-CAT-002
- Under a Mackerel Sky, Joe Strell (2005), Dansbane Elandet DEI-CAT-001
- Sand Dancing, Sylvia Darling (1988), Office Records fil-213
- Hydraulic Angel Hymns, Split Heavens (1988), Office Records fil-244
- Stronger Than the Rain, Split Heavens (1986), Office Records fil-93
- Automatic b/w Shadow of a Heart, Tracks (1986), ¡Ack-Ack!, Office Records fil-57
- Another Face b/w Look (the Other Way) (1985), ¡Ack-Ack!, Office Records fil-36
- Visions of Reality b/w Darkness of Light (1980), The Imports, Cirkle Records 008071-A/B
