= If U Seek Amy =

2009 single by Britney Spears

Single by Britney Spears

from the album Circus
- Released: March 10, 2009
- Recorded: 2008
- Studio: Conway Recording Studios (Los Angeles, CA); Sunset (Hollywood, CA); Maratone (Stockholm, Sweden)
- Genre: Dance-pop; electropop
- Length: 3:36
- Label: Jive; Zomba
- Songwriters: Max Martin; Shellback; Savan Kotecha; Alexander Kronlund
- Producer: Max Martin

Britney Spears singles chronology
"Circus" (2008)	"If U Seek Amy" (2009)	"Radar" (2009)

Music video
- "If U Seek Amy" on YouTube

"If U Seek Amy" (also broadcast on radio as "If U See Amy" or simply "Amy") is a song by American singer Britney Spears from her sixth studio album, Circus (2008). It was released on March 10, 2009, by Jive Records as the third single of the album, chosen by a poll on Spears's official website. "If U Seek Amy" was written and produced by Swedish producer Max Martin, who also wrote previous hits for her first three albums. In the song, Spears is looking for a woman named Amy in a club, and although it appears to be about sex, it is actually about how society perceives her life. Musically, "If U Seek Amy" makes use of instruments such as keyboards and timpani.

"If U Seek Amy" was generally well-received by critics. After its release, the song caused some controversy in various countries due to the title sounding like "F-U-C-K me". This led to the Parents Television Council (PTC) threatening to file indecency complaints against any radio station that played the song during daytime. An edited version of the song titled "If U See Amy" was released in some regions, including in stations owned by Clear Channel Radio and Austereo. "If U Seek Amy" was successful, reaching the top 10 or the top 20 in various countries around the world. It was also Spears' third single from the album Circus to reach the top 20 in the US.

The music video for "If U Seek Amy" begins with a parody of an America's Newsroom report by Megyn Kelly and portrays Spears at a sex party that takes place at her house. Towards the end, she changes into conservative housewife clothes and opens the front door with her family while paparazzi take pictures of them. It references some of her previous music videos such as "...Baby One More Time" and "Piece of Me". Critics noted the similarities with her past work and also compared it to the film Eyes Wide Shut (1999). "If U Seek Amy" was performed at the Circus Starring Britney Spears (2009) and the Femme Fatale Tour (2011). It was also performed as part of the revamped setlist of Spears' Las Vegas residency show, Britney: Piece of Me (2013–17). Most recently, "If U Seek Amy" was performed on Spears' Piece of Me Tour in 2018.

== Background ==
The song was co-written and produced by Max Martin, who wrote hits for Spears' first albums, including "...Baby One More Time" (1998) and "Oops!... I Did It Again" (2000). This marked the first time they worked together since her third studio album, Britney (2001). Recording sessions took place at Conway Recording Studios and Sunset Studios in Hollywood, California. Background vocals by Kinnda and Martin were recorded at Maratone Studios in Stockholm, Sweden. The recordings were mixed by Serban Ghenea at MixStar Studios in Virginia. On December 5, 2008, a poll was added to Spears' official website to choose the third single, involving ten other songs from Circus. On January 7, 2009, it was announced that "If U Seek Amy" had won, receiving 26% of the total votes.

== Music and lyrics ==
"If U Seek Amy" (2009)
A sample of Britney Spears' "If U Seek Amy" where she sings the chorus, which contains the euphemism.

"If U Seek Amy" runs through a dance-oriented beat and features many instruments, including keyboards, snare, bass drums, electric guitars and timpani. According to the sheet music published at musicnotes.com by Hal Leonard Corporation, the song has a beat of 130 beats per minute and is written in the key of A minor. Spears's vocal range spans from G_{3}-C_{5}. In the song, Spears seems to be looking for a woman named Amy in a club. It has been suggested that Amy is either Amy Winehouse or an alter ego of Spears herself. The verses end with the hookline "Ha-ha, hee-hee, ha-ha, ho". The chorus begins with the lines "Love me, hate me / Say what you want about me", a reference to the public's perception and fascination with Spears' life. This presents Spears both as "an object of desire and a punching bag". According to Neil McCormick of The Daily Telegraph, this line also alludes to the public image of Amy Winehouse.

The title, "If U Seek Amy", is a pun, meaning to sound like "F-U-C-K me" when heard in the chorus, "All of the boys and all of the girls are begging to, if you seek Amy." This wordplay was compared to passages of William Shakespeare's Twelfth Night and James Joyce's Ulysses where characters covertly spell out profanities, songs by Memphis Slim, R. Stevie Moore, April Wine, Poster Children and The Script entitled "If You See Kay," and the title of Van Halen's 1991 album, For Unlawful Carnal Knowledge.

== Critical reception ==
The song received generally favorable reviews. Chris Williams of Billboard said the song is "Max Martin and Spears at their best: a stomping dance floor beat with building synths prodding the song along and the singer sounding like she's having a blast being the bad girl". Rolling Stone writer Caryn Ganz called the song one of the standout tracks of the album. Alexis Petridis of The Guardian commented that her stronger and confident delivery in the chorus was noticeably lacking in the rest of the album. Joey Guerra of the Houston Chronicle also said that the "more aggressive, pointed persona" Spears adopts in the song is one of the high points of the album. The Emory Wheel's writer Julia Cox called it "the album's strongest and most unorthodox song". Ricardo Baca of The Denver Post named the song the most fascinating track of the album and commented on the euphemism, saying "It's trashy and clever, and it's also quite fun. And fun is exactly what Spears should be aiming for". However, there were also some negative reviews. Stephen Thomas Erlewine of AllMusic said the song is "a Katy Perry-styled exercise in crass commercial carnality that is at once the best and worst song here". Chris Willman of Entertainment Weekly called it "puerile" and added that "it'll be a middle-school sensation". NME named it one of the filthiest songs of all time.

== Controversy ==
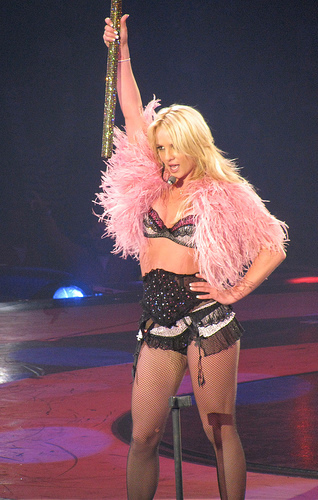
Spears performing "If U Seek Amy" with a pink hammer in her hand, at the Circus Starring Britney Spears

Controversy was first reported by Australian music site Undercover.com.au on December 11, 2008, after the release of the album. Leonie Gardensfield, a homemaker from Adelaide, said, "I was astonished and totally taken aback when I heard my 5 and 7-year-old kids walking around the house singing 'F-U-C-K' ... When I asked them what it was, they told me it was Britney Spears. I was horrified. I got them the Circus album but there was no warning on it ... It is extremely offensive. I feel deceived." Rolling Stone writer Daniel Kreps defended Spears, arguing that parents should have been aware of the singer's musical themes. After the song was announced as the third single from the album, American radio stations were unsure about playing the track due to its double entendre in the chorus. Program directors of Z100 and KIIS-FM compared the issues to be faced by their radio stations to the release of the Black Eyed Peas' 2005 single, "Don't Phunk with My Heart", saying that "listeners thought it was the other word, and so we had to change it to 'mess'". Program director Patti Marshall of Q102 said "It's ok to put in on an album, have fun with it, but we're publicly owned, you know? [...] It's not about us. It's about the mom in the minivan with her 8-year-old." WFLZ's Tommy Chuck said his station produced their own edit of the song that replaced "seek" with "see", with the station's disc jockeys referring to it as "If U See Amy".

Shortly after, the Parents Television Council (PTC) threatened to file indecency complaints with the Federal Communications Commission (FCC) against any station that played the song between 6 a.m. and 10 p.m. PTC President Tim Winter said "there is no misinterpreting the lyrics to this song, and it's certainly not about a girl named Amy. It's one thing for a song with these lyrics to be included on a CD so that fans who wish to hear it can do so, but it's an entirely different matter when this song is played over the publicly owned airwaves, especially at a time when children are likely to be in the listening audience." RBR.com reported that "interestingly, Circus was reviewed by Common Sense Media, another organization whose mission is to help parents manage their children's media consumption. It rated it appropriate for age 13 and up, but made no specific mention of 'If U Seek Amy'. Even more interestingly, reputed incoming FCC Chair Julius Genachowski is a founding board member of Common Sense." The threats of the PTC were later extended to cable music channels that played the music video; however, the FCC does not have control over cable.

On January 23, 2009, Tom Poleman, senior vice president of programming for Clear Channel Radio, announced they planned to play an edited version. Sharon Dastur of Z100 added that Spears had recorded a new version of the song and the new edit would be provided by Jive Records. David Hinckley of the Daily News commented that "Clear Channel, which laid off 9% of its workforce this week, is hardly in the mood to finance an FCC fight right now". Finally, a radio edit titled "If U See Amy" was released to American radio stations (after some stations briefly eliminated those lyrics of the song entirely), which changes the "seek" to "see", which instead spells "F-U-C-A me". The amended version was released in the UK in May. While the song has not officially been renamed or released in Australia, some radio stations, such as those belonging to Austereo, play the censored version, while others continue to play it uncensored. Both the music video and the international radio single remain "If U Seek Amy".

== Commercial performance ==
According to Nielsen SoundScan, "If U Seek Amy" sold over 107,000 digital copies in the United States within two weeks of the album's release. On April 11, 2009, the song peaked at number 17 on the Billboard Hot Digital Songs. On May 9, 2009, the song peaked at number 19 on the Billboard Hot 100, making Circus the first Spears album to have three top 20 hits since her 1999 debut, ...Baby One More Time. As of March 2015, "If U Seek Amy" has sold 1.3 million digital downloads in the United States according to Nielsen SoundScan. It is her 10th best-selling digital single in the country. In Canada, the song debuted at 88 on December 20, 2008. It returned on February 14, 2009, at 86 before reaching the 13th position, where it finally peaked on April 4, 2009.

"If U Seek Amy" debuted at number 49 on the ARIA Singles Chart on February 16, 2009, and moved to a peak position of 11 on March 30, 2009, also becoming the chart's "greatest gainer". It has since been certified gold by the Australian Recording Industry Association (ARIA) with sales of over 35,000 copies. "If U Seek Amy" entered the UK Singles Chart at number 45 on April 6, 2009, due to its rising digital sales. After its physical release, it peaked at number 20 on May 10, 2009. According to the Official Charts Company, the song has sold 105,000 copies there. "If U Seek Amy" also achieved success worldwide, reaching the top 10 in Belgium (Wallonia), France and Turkey, and the top 20 in Belgium (Flanders), Ireland, New Zealand, and Sweden.

== Music video ==
=== Development ===
The music video for "If U Seek Amy" was filmed on February 7, 2009, at Pacific Palisades, California, and was directed by Jake Nava, who previously worked with Spears for her "My Prerogative" music video. Spears was styled by David Thomas for the video. During the scenes at the party, she wears American Apparel wet-looking leggings and a black corset from London lingerie designer Bordelle with diamond-shaped holes. She also wears a pair of red high-heeled Louboutins with rouced petals, that were not available for sale until a month after the video was released. When she is dressed as a housewife, Spears has a blonde wig, wears a pale pink sweater, a white skirt from Derek Lam and a Lacoste polo shirt. The music video premiered on March 12, 2009, on both Virgin Mobile's official website and Spears's official websites.

=== Synopsis ===
Spears dressed as a housewife, during the final scenes of the music video

The video starts with a news anchor (played by Kristina Mitchell) saying the title of the song above a news banner that reads "Britney Spears song lyrics spell out obscenity in disguise". This is a parody of an America's Newsroom report by Megyn Kelly. It then skips to a house, in which a sex party is coming to an end. Spears starts singing while sitting on the edge of a bed while the people that surround her are getting dressed. She gets up and looks out the window. As the first verse ends, she picks up a pair of panties from the floor, recalling her personal struggles and the "Piece of Me" video. She dances with four male dancers in the first chorus. During the second chorus, she dances with four other female dancers dressed in cheerleading outfits, while many men are watching them dance. The screen fades to white and Spears begins to change into a conservative 1950s-inspired housewife outfit. As the chorus begins again, she comes out of her bedroom. She walks down the stairs, with dancers surrounding her and a woman gives her a potholder, which she uses to pick up a pie. After this, she walks out the front door of the house and is joined by her seemingly conservative-looking husband and children, one of them dressed with the schoolgirl outfit Spears wore in the "...Baby One More Time" video. As they go down the walkway, they are surrounded by paparazzi, who have no idea what goes on behind closed doors. While the kids and husband wave, Spears smiles for the camera and blows a kiss. The video then ends with the news anchor saying, "Doesn't make any sense, does it?".

=== Reception ===
James Montgomery of MTV stated that the video manages to combine elements from her previous music videos, such as the style of "Everytime" and the attitude of "Stronger". He also referred to it as "a pretty amazing amalgamation of all things Brit, and a nice primer of her entire career up to this point". Rolling Stone writer Daniel Kreps compared the party in the video to the 1999 film Eyes Wide Shut and added that "this may be the first Spears video ever crafted strictly with the morally lax Internet in mind, a brazen clip that doesn't have to tone down its explicit nature lyrically and visually in order to get airplay". Leah Greenblatt of Entertainment Weekly said, "it's kind of difficult to believe the song's real meaning will get past even the thickest listener, the video itself is pretty tame...almost disappointingly so". The reviewer also compared Spears' hairstyle during the housewife scenes to that of Marilyn Monroe.

== Live performances ==
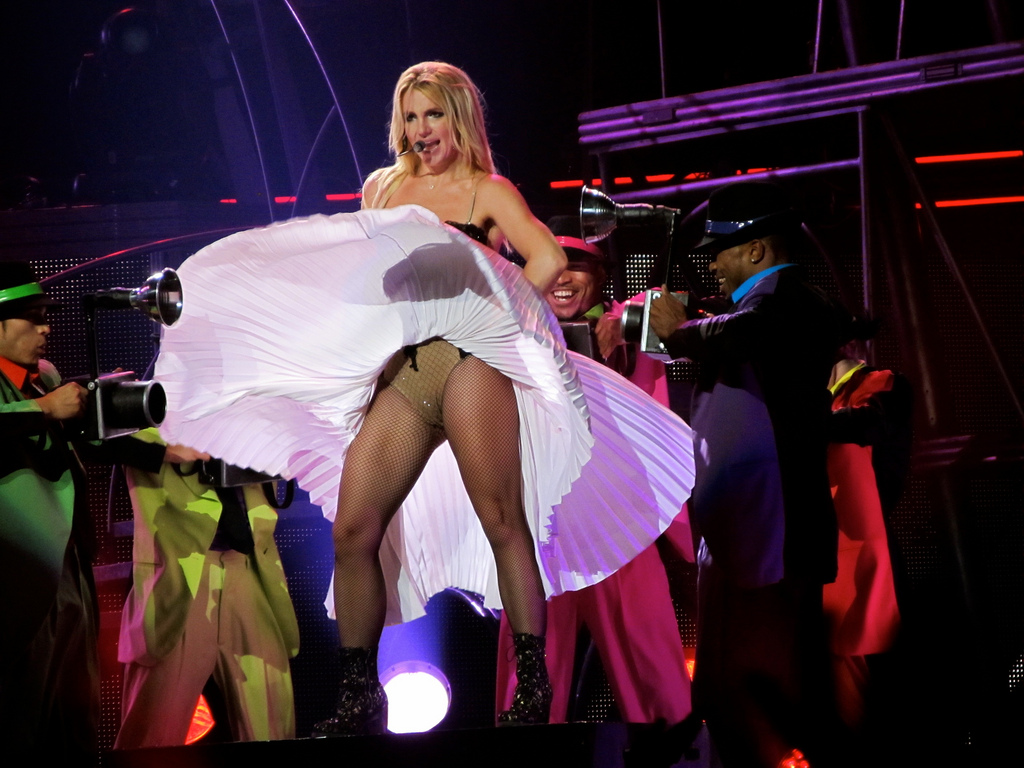
Spears performing "If U Seek Amy" at the Femme Fatale Tour

Spears performed the song during 2009's the Circus Starring Britney Spears. After a performance of "Boys" from Britney, Spears performed a military drill with her male dancers, which ended with her putting on a faux fur vest to perform "If U Seek Amy". At the end, Spears pulled a giant pink hammer and proceeded to knock her dancers off the stage, in a similar way to Whac-A-Mole. Jerry Shriver of USA Today said in the opening night of the tour, "[the] single 'If U Seek Amy' draws a huge roar and sing-along from the crowd as Spears shakes her long blond mane". Craig Rosen of The Hollywood Reporter commented, "The artist that raised the ire of parents from the beginning in her scandalous schoolgirl outfit also continues to use shock-and-awe tactics. Her latest, 'If U Seek Amy' [...] was included in the set, much to the delight of her young fans".

"If U Seek Amy" was also performed by Spears at 2011's Femme Fatale Tour. Spears reappeared onstage after "Lace and Leather" to perform a jazz-inspired version of the song, wearing a white skirt and standing over a fan, recalling Marilyn Monroe's iconic scene in The Seven Year Itch (1955). The backdrops behind her showed 1940s crime film-inspired black-and-white footage while photographers in colorful outfits took pictures of her. Rick Florino of Artistdirect said, "Marrying old school detective fare and stadium-size anthems is something no other pop star has done, and once again Britney's the first." Nicki Escudero of the Phoenix New Times stated that it was "nice" to hear remixed versions of older hits, "such as the jazzy 'If You Seek Amy,' [sic] the sultry and Middle Eastern-inspired 'Boys' and the sped-up 'Toxic'."

Spears performed the song at her revamped Las Vegas residency show, Britney: Piece of Me, at The AXIS theater at Planet Hollywood Resort & Casino, starting in 2016. The performance, which pays homage to Spears' Circus era, immediately follows the song "Circus" (2008) on the set list.

In both world tour adaptations of the residency, Britney: Live in Concert and Piece of Me Tour, as well in her Apple Music Festival performance in 2016, "If U Seek Amy" was also performed, mirroring the same performance of the residency.

== Track listings ==
- CD single
1. "If U Seek Amy" – 3:37
2. "Circus" (Joe Bermudez Radio Remix) – 3:41
- CD maxi single
1. "If U Seek Amy" – 3:37
2. "If U Seek Amy" (Bimbo Jones Radio Remix) – 2:57
3. "If U Seek Amy" (Crookers Remix) – 4:29
4. "If U Seek Amy" (U-Tern Remix) – 6:10
5. "If U Seek Amy" (Video Enhancement) – 3:46
- Digital download – Digital 45
1. "If U Seek Amy" – 3:35
2. "If U Seek Amy" (Crookers Remix) – 4:29
- Digital download – Remix EP
1. "If U Seek Amy" (Crookers Remix) – 4:29
2. "If U Seek Amy" (Mike Rizzo – Funk Generation Club Mix) – 7:52
3. "If U Seek Amy" (Weird Tapes – Club Mix) – 5:14
4. "If U Seek Amy" (Junior Vasquez Big Room Mix) – 9:43
5. "If U Seek Amy" (U-Tern Remix) – 6:10
6. "If U Seek Amy" (Doug Grayson – Club Mix) – 5:18

== Credits and personnel ==
- Vocals: Britney Spears
- Writers: Max Martin, Shellback, Savan Kotecha and Alexander Kronlund
- Producer: Max Martin
- Mixing: Serban Ghenea
- Pro Tools editing: John Hanes
- Programming: Shellback and Max Martin
- Background vocals: Britney Spears, Kinnda and Max Martin

== Charts ==
=== Weekly charts ===
Chart (2009–2010)	Peak position
Australia (ARIA)	11
Austria (Ö3 Austria Top 40)	34
Belgium (Ultratop 50 Flanders)	16
Belgium (Ultratop 50 Wallonia)	8
Brazil (Brasil Hot 100 Airplay)	1
Brazil (Brasil Hot Pop Songs)	4
Bulgaria (BAMP)	7
Canada Hot 100 (Billboard)	13
Canada CHR/Top 40 (Billboard)	3
Canada Hot AC (Billboard)	25
CIS Airplay (TopHit)	70
Croatia International Airplay (HRT)	21
Czech Republic Airplay (ČNS IFPI)	39
Denmark (Tracklisten)	23
El Salvador (EFE)	8
France Download (SNEP)	11
Germany (GfK)	36
Hungary (Rádiós Top 40)	38
Ireland (IRMA)	11
Israel International Airplay (Media Forest)	9
Italy (FIMI)	46
Mexico Top Anglo (Monitor Latino)	2
Netherlands (Dutch Top 40 Tipparade)	2
Netherlands (Single Top 100)	63
New Zealand (Recorded Music NZ)	17
Russia Airplay (TopHit)	66
Slovakia Airplay (ČNS IFPI)	16
South Korea International Singles (Gaon)	75
Sweden (Sverigetopplistan)	13
Switzerland (Schweizer Hitparade)	61
UK Singles (Official Charts)	20
US Billboard Hot 100	19
US Adult Pop Airplay (Billboard)	37
US Dance Club Songs (Billboard)	16
US Pop Airplay (Billboard)	8
US Rhythmic Airplay (Billboard)	33

Chart (2022)	Peak position
Malaysia (RIM)	10

=== Year-end charts ===
Chart (2009)	Position
Australia (ARIA)	97
Belgium (Ultratop 50 Wallonia)	65
Brazil (Crowley Broadcast Analysis)	29
Canada (Canadian Hot 100)	68
Croatia International Airplay (HRT)	92
France Download (SNEP)	87
Hungary (Rádiós Top 40)	169
Lebanon (NRJ)	49
Sweden (Sverigetopplistan)	71
UK Singles (OCC)	172
US Billboard Hot 100	74

== Certifications and sales ==
Region	Certification	Certified units/sales
Australia (ARIA)	Gold	35,000^{^}
France	—	39,602
New Zealand (RMNZ)	Gold	15,000^{‡}
United Kingdom (BPI)	Gold	400,000^{‡}
United States (RIAA)	2× Platinum	2,000,000^{‡}
^{^} Shipments figures based on certification alone.^{‡} Sales+streaming figures based on certification alone.

== Release history ==
Release dates and formats for "If U Seek Amy"
Region	Date	Format(s)	Label(s)	Ref.
United States	March 10, 2009	Contemporary hit radio	Jive	
Ireland	March 13, 2009	Digital download	Sony Music	
New Zealand	March 16, 2009	Digital download	Sony Music	
Germany	April 12, 2009	CD	Sony Music	
Germany	May 29, 2009	Maxi CD	Sony Music	
United States	June 2, 2009	Digital download (EP)	Jive	
United Kingdom	June 15, 2009	Digital download (EP)	RCA	
