= Golden Blue =

Studio album by St. Christopher
- Released: 2000
- Genre: Indie pop
- Label: Parasol

St. Christopher chronology
Lioness (1996)	Golden Blue (2000)

Professional ratings
Review scores
Source	Rating
Allmusic	link
Philadelphia Weekly	D+ link
PopMatters	(favourable) link

Golden Blue is an album by St. Christopher released on Parasol Records in 2000. The album received mixed reviews, with Martin C. Strong in The Great Indie Discography calling it "an album too far." Allmusic's Stewart Mason was a little more complimentary, picking out "The First or the Last" (which he described as having a "glorious fuzztone and reverb guitar sound") and "Low", which he called "a neo-psychedelic gem", although he describes listening to the album as "a rather frustrating experience." The Philadelphia Weekly writer Elisa Ludwig rated the album D+, commenting "most of these tunes are simply not strong enough to carry their load of maudlin, syrupy excess." PopMatters' David Fufkin was more impressed, stating "again, Parasol has a winner."

== Track listing ==
1. "North Wind"
2. "Riverbank"
3. "Majestic"
4. "The Devil from Nowhere"
5. "Old and in the Way"
6. "Chemical King"
7. "The First or the Last"
8. "Black Girl"
9. "Low"
10. "Weird Things"
11. "Tell Me There's a God"
