= Doleful Lions =

- Jonathan & Robert Scott

Background information
- Origin: United States
- Genre: Pop
- Instruments: Vocals, keyboards, drums, guitar, bass
- Years active: 1996–present
- Labels: Parasol, Wild Kindness, The Great Pop Supplement, Broken Horse, JesusWarhol, Paranoid Futures, Marijuana Summer, Impossible Colors

The Doleful Lions are a pop group headed up by frontman Jonathan Scott and usually brother Robert Scott. Their first 45" was released by Parasol Records out of Illinois in 1997 and they stayed with the label until 2008's "7" they now release their albums on Bandcamp and various one offs on other labels. They have been featured on MOJO magazine's compilation CD's "The Who Covered" and "In My Room" a Beach Boys Tribute. In 2006, the Lions collaborated with coL; creating the side project: ColourSons.

== Discography ==
- Hang Around In Your Head b/w Motel Swim '45 (1997 Parasol Records)
- Motel Swim (1998 Parasol Records)
- The Rats Are Coming! The Werewolves Are Here! (1999 Parasol Records)
- Conjured Monsters cassette (2000 self release)
- Song Cyclops Volume One (2000 Parasol Records)
- Out Like A Lamb (2002 Parasol Records/ Broken Horse UK)
- Shaded Lodge And Mausoleum (2005 Parasol Records)
- Song Cyclops Volume Two (2006 Parasol Records)
- 7 (2008 Parasol Records)
- Lucifer, The Light EP (2011 Bandcamp)
- What Was On The Floor Of Jonathan's Car, And How It Got There (2011 Bandcamp)
- Creepsville Field Recordings Volume One (2011 Bandcamp)
- Creepsville Field Recordings Volume Two: Chicago Chapter Of The Crowned And Conquering Child (2011 Bandcamp)
- This Is The Age Of Video Violence EP (2011 Bandcamp)
- Witchseason And Madrigal (2011 Bandcamp)
- The Rockets Of Pasadena (2011 Bandcamp)
- Let's Break Larry Levan Out Of Prison! EP (2011 Bandcamp)
- Sympathy For The Thrillkillers EP (2012 Bandcamp)
- Kent State/Doleful Lions cassette (2012 Paranoid Futures Records)
- Doleful Lions Vs. The PMRC (2012 Bandcamp)
- Let's Break Bobby Beausoleil Out Of Prison! (2012 Wild Kindness Records)

== Compilations ==
- Pop Till You Drop (1999 S'More Records)
- Parasol Records: Sweet 16 Volume Two (1999 Parasol Records)
- Beikoku Ongaku magazine issue #17 CD (2000)
- Parasol Records: Sweet 16 Volume Five (2002 Parasol Records)
- Parasol Records: Sweet 16 Volume Six (2002 Parasol Records)
- Parasol Records: Sweet 16 Volume Eight (2005 Parasol Records)
- MOJO Presents: The Who Covered (2006 Mojo Magazine)
- MOJO Presents: In My Room (2007 Mojo Magazine)
- Trip Inside the House Summer Solstice comp (2008 Trip Inside This House blog)
- Sunshine Off the Tracks: A Benefit for GEMS (2012 Wild Kindness Records)
