= New World Record =

Studio album by Poster Children
- Released: February 23, 1999
- Recorded: 1998, Studio Tedium, Champaign, Illinois
- Genre: Alternative rock
- Length: 44:47
- Label: spinART
- Producer: Jonathan Pines, Poster Children

Poster Children chronology
RTFM (1997)	New World Record (1999)	DDD (2000)

Professional ratings
Review scores
Source	Rating
AllMusic	4/5 stars
The Encyclopedia of Popular Music	3/5 stars
Pitchfork	8.1/10
PopMatters	6.8/10

New World Record is the sixth album by American alternative rock band Poster Children, released in 1999. It was the first album recorded in their own studio, Tedium. It was among the first albums made available for purchase in the MP3 format.

== Critical reception ==
Tucson Weekly called New World Record "an album that gets closest to the ferocious energy the band generates on stage" and "the best thing they've put out since 1993's Tool." The Chicago Reader called the album "a striking left turn from a band that's produced more than its share of mediocre alternapop." CMJ New Music Report called it "melodic, punchy post-punk [that] works in the darker intensity of the band's famed live shows."

== Track listing ==
1. "Accident Waiting to Happen" – 3:56
2. "6x6" – 3:35
3. "Time to Kill" – 2:24
4. "Ankh" – 3:54
5. "Mr. Goodnight" – 3:17
6. "Chemicals" – 4:42
7. "Straightline" – 3:34
8. "Planet Earth" – 2:56
9. "Good Cop Bad Cop" – 3:57
10. "Secret Handshake" – 4:50
11. "Wait and See" – 4:00
12. "Deadman" – 3:53

== Personnel ==
- Rick Valentin – Vocals, Guitar
- Rose Marshack – Bass, vocals
- Jim Valentin – Guitar
- Howie Kantoff – Drums
