= Seven Percent Solution =

American music band

Seven Percent Solution was an American rock band formed in Austin, Texas who played psychedelic atmospheric rock during 1992–2003. They were a part of the 1990s shoegazing, space rock genre. Known for melodic, moody songs, they combined introspective lyrics and vocals with an experimental use of guitars and a more "classic rock"-style rhythm section.

Seven Percent Solution recorded two full-length CDs and various cassette tapes and singles. Many of their releases came in handmade covers and limited editions. Most famously their first CD All About Satellites and SpaceShips came with an extra copy of the CD in its own cover with the instruction "Give this copy to a friend". The band developed a loyal following through college radio and praise from magazines such as Rolling Stone, Magnet, Option, CMJ, and Pop Culture Press. Overseas they were featured in magazines such as Losing Today and Ptolemaic Terrascope. They toured regularly throughout the United States. Due to working on other projects and members relocating to other states, the band played its last shows in 2004.

== Band members ==
- Reese Beeman - Vocals, guitar, bass, drums 1992–2004
- James Adkisson - Guitar 1993–2004
- Julian Capps - Guitar, bass, vocals 1997–2004
- Mike Sherrill - Bass 1998–2004
- Scott Sasser - Drums 1992–1998
- Bob Smoot - Bass 1992–1996
- Dwayn Moore - Bass 1996–1997
- George Reyes - Bass 1997–1998
- Sean McGee - Drums 1998–2001
- James Harwood - Drums 2001–2004

== Discography ==
=== All About Satellites and Spaceships CD ===
Released in 1996 on the band's own X-ray label. Recorded and mixed by Reese Beeman in his garage studio. It was mastered by Charles Reeves. The initial release came in a handmade cover by the Chicago-based Fireproof Press. In addition the band made their own cover that fit into a pocket of the main cover containing a second copy of the CD. With the instruction to "give this copy to a friend". Eventually in 1998 a single-CD jewel case version was released. From 1996 through 1998 Satellites received praise from a wide range of publications, most notably from Rolling Stone, with a review by the well-known rock historian David Fricke. It was later included in Rolling Stone online's List of Albums That Mattered in 1998. Madonna - Ray of Light, Lauryn Hill - The Miseducation of Lauryn Hill, Jeff Buckley - Sketches, Air - Moon Safari, 7% Solution - All About Satellites and Spaceships, Beastie Boys - Hello Nasty. The CD topped at number 20 on the CMJ music charts.

- Reese Beeman - Vocals, guitar,
- Scott Sasser - Drums,
- Dwayn Moore - Bass,
- James Adkisson - Guitar
1. All About Satellites and Spaceships
2. Built on Sand
3. Revolve
4. Happy?
5. Air Bends Sunlight
6. Your Kingdom, Your World
7. Road and the Common
8. Snuff Gold and Gold Tilings
9. Blindshore
10. Lost
11. Sky Suspended

=== Gabriel's Waltz CD ===
Released in 1999 on the band's own X-ray label. Recorded and mixed by Reese Beeman. In the middle of recording their second CD drummer Scott Sasser had to suddenly depart the band. In an attempt to finish the CD without a drummer the band sifted through the recordings of songs that were most complete and noticed a similarity. Many of the songs were in waltz time. It so happened that waltz steps can be thought of as a metaphor for the cycle of life. So that became a theme. The cusp of the new millennium was also a theme. Addressing the complicated feelings associated with the endings of things and change. The cover art included wood engravings from a 1545 series titled The Dance of Death by Hans Holbein. A limited hand numbered gatefold paperboard edition was also released on Lone Starfighter Records. This version included an extra song. A cover version of the song Oh Yeah. Originally by the German band Can In the music press Gabriel's Waltz received outstanding reviews but not in the same measure as their first CD.

- Reese Beeman - Vocals, guitar,
- Scott Sasser - Drums,
- Julian Capps - Bass, guitar,
- James Adkisson - Guitar, Omnichord
1. Dear Anne
2. The End Of Faith
3. Carousel
4. Bruise
5. Threshold
6. Lullaby
7. The Innocentes
8. Dust And Ashes
9. Gabriel's Waltz
10. Oh Yeah - limited-edition version

=== 7-inch single releases ===
- "Sugar / Halo" released 1993 on X-ray Records
- "Lullaby / Oh Yeah" (Can cover) 1998 on Hidden Agenda

=== Cassette releases ===
- 7% Solution released 1993 on Beesmasser
- Reese Beeman -Vocals, guitar
- Bob Smoot- Bass
- Scott Sasser - Drums
1. Take it Back
2. Cycle
3. Waiting for the Rain
4. Veil
5. Believe
6. Valentine
7. Walk
8. Threshold

=== Sugar ===
Released 1994 on X-ray Records

- Reese Beeman -Vocals, guitar
- Bob Smoot- Bass
- Scott Sasser, Drums
- James Adkisson - Guitar
1. Halo
2. Bruise
3. Top Half of the Earth
4. Carousel
5. Sometimes Never
6. Sugar
7. Light
8. Time and Waiting

=== Covers tape ===
A fans-only Christmas gift 1997 on X-ray records

1. The Beatles - Tomorrow Never Knows
2. Can - Oh Yeah
3. Pink Floyd - Astronomy Domine
4. Opal - Super Nova

== Live performance ==
Live their sets featured film and light shows and a long list of eclectic cover songs. Many of the first Seven Percent Solution shows included setting out rugs and pillows for the audience. The shows incorporated 2 to 3 16mm projectors, spinning color wheels and liquid light projections. Later they used VCRs and DVD players to show their own home made videos. The sets generally included at least one cover song. The Beatles - Tomorrow Never Knows, Can - Oh Yeah, Pink Floyd - Astronomy Domine, Opal - Super Nova, Nina Simone - Lilac Wine, Leonard Cohen - Hallelujah, Jeff Buckley - Lover, Radiohead - Palo Alto, You and Whose Army, Massive Attack - Angel, Portishead - Over, Van Morrison - Sweet Thing, Stereolab - Metronomic Underground, The Cure - Like Cockatoos, The Monkees - Porpoise Song, Loop - Be Here Now

== The Ebow ==
The band became known for its extensive and creative use of a guitar effects device called the Ebow. The EBow is a hand-held electronic device for guitar. The small battery-powered device replaces the pick in the right hand. The EBow produces an infinite sustain, letting the guitarist mimic strings, horns, and woodwinds. Seven Percent Solution is mentioned on the E-Bow website and included in a listing of musicians and bands found in the E-bow packaging.

== Present day ==
In 2010 Seven Percent Solution played two reunion shows in Austin Texas. They also formed a new band HeadShy that includes past Seven Percent Solution members Reese Beeman, James Adkisson, and Mike Sherrill and with the addition of Lisa Lipkin and Wayne Duncan. James Adkisson and James Harwood recorded and performed with A Five and Dime Ship James Adkisson has recorded two solo projects. Blindshore and Dirac C Mike Sherrill and Sean McGee are also members of King Air.
