= Junior Citizen =

Studio album by Poster Children
- Released: February 14, 1995
- Recorded: 1994, Smart Studios, Madison, Wisconsin
- Genre: Alternative rock, punk rock
- Length: 45:08
- Label: Sire
- Producer: Brian Anderson, Poster Children

Poster Children chronology
Just like You (1994)	Junior Citizen (1995)	RTFM (1997)

Professional ratings
Review scores
Source	Rating
AllMusic	4.5/5 stars
The Encyclopedia of Popular Music	3/5 stars
MusicHound Rock: The Essential Album Guide	4.5/5 stars

Junior Citizen is the fourth album by the American alternative rock band Poster Children, released in 1995.

== Production ==
The recording sessions took place at Smart Studios in Madison, Wisconsin. The album was produced by Brian Anderson and the band.

== Critical reception ==
Trouser Press wrote that "[Rick] Valentin’s vocals have never been more pronounced, the rhythms never more insistent (or rigid), the tunes never punchier or more melodic." The Washington Post wrote that "the band's lack of a distinctive style does undermine the effectiveness of such catchy tracks as 'He's My Star' and 'New Boyfriend'." CMJ New Music Monthly thought that "the raw power of the band's early material has become superseded by technical noodling."

== Track listing ==
1. "Get a Life" – 5:04
2. "Junior Citizen" – 5:15
3. "He's My Star" – 4:22
4. "Revolution Year Zero" – 3:06
5. "Drug I Need" – 5:50
6. "New Boyfriend" – 4:15
7. "Wide Awake" – 4:09
8. "King for a Day" – 2:02
9. "Mustaine" – 2:57
10. "Downwind" – 3:47
11. "One of Us" – 4:21

== Personnel ==
- Brian Anderson – Producer, Engineer
- Bryce Goggin – Mixing
- Rick Valentin – Vocals, Guitar
- Rose Marshack – Bass, vocals
- Jim Valentin – Guitar
- Howie Kantoff – Drums
