= DDD (album) =

Studio album by Poster Children
- Released: February 22, 2000
- Recorded: 1999, Studio Tedium, Champaign, Illinois
- Genre: Alternative rock
- Length: 38:01
- Label: spinART
- Producer: Jonathan Pines, Poster Children

Poster Children chronology
New World Record (1999)	DDD (2000)	No More Songs About Sleep and Fire (2004)

Professional ratings
Review scores
Source	Rating
AllMusic	3/5 stars
The Encyclopedia of Popular Music	3/5 stars
Pitchfork	7.8/10
Spin	6/10

DDD is the seventh album by American alternative rock band Poster Children, released in 2000. It derives its name from the SPARS Code for a digitally recorded, mixed, and mastered album.

== Critical reception ==
In its 4-star review, The Austin Chronicle wrote that "Rick Valentin's lyrics are sharp-edged and hard-sung as ever, he and brother Jim's guitars bouncing off each other like crossed chainsaws." Spin called the album "an energetic look at life-time employment in a young person's game, coloring bemusement and revulsion with ba-ba verses and who-gives-a-damn choruses."

== Track listing ==
1. "This Town Needs a Fire" – 2:36
2. "Strange Attractors" – 3:30
3. "Daisy Changed" – 3:26
4. "Zero Stars" – 2:02
5. "Time Share" – 2:50
6. "Rock & Roll" – 1:27
7. "Persimmon" – 2:15
8. "Elf" – 2:33
9. "The Old School and the New" – 3:52
10. "Judge Freeball" – 2:41
11. "Silhouette" – 3:10
12. "Perfect Product" – 2:39
13. "Peck N'Paw" – 5:00

== Personnel ==
- Rick Valentin – Vocals, Guitar
- Rose Marshack – Bass, vocals
- Jim Valentin – Guitar
- Howie Kantoff – Drums
