= Heartless Moon =

Studio album by Brendan Gamble
- Released: September 24, 2002
- Label: Mud

Heartless Moon is an album by American singer-songwriter Brendan Gamble. It was released on September 24, 2002, on Mud Records.

== Track listing ==
All tracks written by Brendan Gamble.

1. Heartless Moon – 6:01
2. Lion's Share – 2:49
3. Skipping Rocks – 3:12
4. Looking for Margrett – 3:56
5. I Don't Need December – 3:10
6. Through Through – 3:01
7. This Never Stops – 3:53
8. Gone to Seed – 1:31
9. Will of Your Heart – 2:42
10. Rested – 3:59
11. Ways to Walk – 3:13
12. True to a Lie – 3:44
13. Now – 8:03

== Reception ==
Stewart Mason of AllMusic called it "1970s-style singer/songwriter mopery" similar to Joni Mitchell's Blue and Nick Drake's Pink Moon. Mason wrote that it "isn't always an easy listen" but recommended it to fans of "sensitive-guy pop". Brent Hagerman of Exclaim! wrote that Gamble's "emotional quagmire [makes] for good listening" without being self-indulgent. Writing in CMJ New Music Monthly, Rob O'Connor called it a "stunning solo acoustic album" that shows that he is a "top-shelf sing-songwriter" despite his history of supporting roles in the industry.
