= Tool of the Man =

Studio album by Poster Children
- Released: February 26, 1993
- Recorded: 1992, Dreamland, Gatehouse, New York City, New York
- Genre: Alternative rock, post-hardcore
- Length: 41:16
- Label: Sire; Creation (UK)
- Producer: Mike McMackin

Poster Children chronology
Daisychain Reaction (1991)	Tool of the Man (1993)	Just Like You (1994)

Professional ratings
Review scores
Source	Rating
AllMusic	3/5 stars
The Encyclopedia of Popular Music	3/5 stars
MusicHound Rock: The Essential Album Guide	3/5 stars

Tool of the Man is the third album by American alternative rock band Poster Children, released in 1993. The title of the album comes from graffiti written in dust on the band's van during the South by Southwest Festival: "Poster Children, Band of the Year, Tool of the Man." The album art consists of several optical illusions, including an afterimage of the United States flag on the front cover.

== Critical reception ==
Trouser Press wrote: "Far from acting like tools of the man, Poster Children opt for an even less homogenized approach: sugar-free rockers mixed with knottier, more experimental mood pieces."

== Track listing ==
1. "Dynamite Chair" – 3:01
2. "Tommyhaus" – 3:26
3. "In My Way" – 5:07
4. "Clock Street" – 4:17
5. "Redline" – 5:20
6. "Shotguns & Pickups" – 2:32
7. "Blatant Dis" – 3:56
8. "Idiot Show" – 4:19
9. "Outside In" – 3:30
10. "Three Bullets" – 5:48

== Personnel ==
Poster Children

- Rick Valentin – Vocals, Guitar
- Rose Marshack – Bass, vocals
- Jim Valentin – Guitar
- John Herndon – Drums

Technical personnel

- Mike McMackin – Producer, Engineer
