= Henry Frayne (musician) =

Irish-American musician

Henry David Frayne (born January 26, 1965) is an Irish-American musician.

Frayne was the second guitarist of three in the long history of Champaign, Illinois' Ack-Ack, where he met Lynn Canfield, Brendan Gamble, Steve Shields and Joe Strell. He was a founding member of Area and The Moon Seven Times — new wave/ethereal music groups also from Champaign-Urbana, Illinois. The Moon Seven Times was signed to Third Mind Records, which subsequently became part of Roadrunner Records (later to become a part of Warner Music Group.)

The Moon Seven Times recorded three CDs before being dropped by Roadrunner Records in 1997. Frayne went back to a side project recorded in 1991 and released Lanterna, an instrumental album of driving shoegazing material featuring The Moon Seven Times sonographer Brendan Gamble on drums and lyrics on "Down by the Seine" by Lynn Canfield.

Lanterna became the name of the project, as well as the album (which was initially released on Urbana's Parasol Records before being picked up by Rykodisc). Since the initial œuvre, Lanterna has shared five albums of recorded material, mostly via Badman Records.

Henry Frayne is the second of two sons of professors John and Eva Frayne.

Henry Frayne retired from the University of Illinois on August 15, 2010, and now dedicates himself exclusively to recording and performing music.

== Discography ==
With The Moon Seven Times

- The Moon Seven Times (Roadrunner Records, 1993)
- 7=49 (Roadrunner Records, 1994)
- Sunburnt (Roadrunner Records, 1997)

With Lanterna

- Lanterna limited edition boxed cassette (self-released, 1992)
- Of Shapes That Haunt Thought's Wilderness (Elfish, 1993)
- Lanterna (Parasol, 1995)
- Lanterna (Rykodisc, 1998)
- Scenic/Lanterna Live (split EP with Scenic, Parasol, 1998)
- Elm Street (Badman Records, 2001)
- Sands (Badman Records, 2002)
- Highways (Badman Records, 2004)
- Desert Ocean (Jemez Mountain, 2006)
- Backyards (Badman Records, 2016)
- Hidden Drives (Badman Records, 2021)
