= Brendan Gamble =

American singer-songwriter

- Born: 1966 (age 59–60); Urbana, Illinois
- Occupations: drummer, producer, recording engineer, singer-songwriter

Brendan Gamble (born 1966) is an American singer-songwriter, drummer, music producer, and audio engineer.

A native of Urbana, Illinois, Gamble first appeared in the seminal new wave band ¡Ack-Ack! with vocalist Lynn Canfield and guitarist Henry Frayne, and played on their 1985 single, "Another Face". He replaced the original drummer of the post-hardcore/indie rock group Poster Children in 1988 and appeared on their first widely-released album, Flower Plower.

After Gamble's departure from Poster Children, he resumed working with Frayne on early material for a project that would later be named Lanterna. Around the same time, Canfield joined Frayne and Gamble along with bassist Don Gerard to form a new group called the Moon Seven Times. The band was signed to Third Mind Records, which later became part of Roadrunner Records, and recorded three albums before being dropped by the label in 1997. Canfield and Gamble continued working together in a band called Shotgun Wedding, which released one album in 1998. In 1988, Gamble joined the three members of the Urbana-Champaign band Obvious Man (drummer Shannon Drew; bassist Matt Golosinski; and guitarist Chris Rogers) to create a new band called Stark, which performed in and around Champaign-Urbana, including with Smashing Pumpkins. Gamble was Stark's vocalist and rhythm guitarist.

In the mid-1990s, Gamble began working as an audio engineer for acts such as Tommy Keene, Braid, and Planes Mistaken for Stars. Most notably, Gamble began working with the band American Football in 1998, and eventually produced and engineered their first two releases, a three-song EP and their full-length debut album, both of which are self-titled. The band expected that the album wouldn't receive any attention, and broke up shortly after its release, but it developed a word-of-mouth cult following, and today is considered a flagship release among the original late-1990s Midwest emo scene and a central influence on the 2010s emo revival.

2002 saw the release of Gamble's own debut album, Heartless Moon, as well as his own involvement as an engineer on The Palace at 4am (Part I) by Jay Bennett and Edward Burch, and the sixth album by Tommy Keene, The Merry-Go-Round Broke Down.

== Discography ==
- Poster Children, Flower Plower (1989, Limited Potential/Frontier Records/12 Inch Records)
- The Moon Seven Times, The Moon Seven Times (1993, Third Mind Records)
- The Moon Seven Times, 7=49 (1994, Roadrunner Records)
- The Moon Seven Times, Sunburnt (1997, Roadrunner Records)
- Stark, "Stark" (2001, NoirImp)
- Heartless Moon (2002, Parasol Records)
