= The Imports =

American punk rock band

- Origin: Chicago, Illinois, United States
- Genres: Punk rock, post-punk
- Years active: 1979–1980
- Members: Ben Krug (Vocals); Tom Krug (Guitar); Joe Strell (Bass); Tom Wall (Drums)
- Past members: John Krug (Drums); Alec Dale (Drums)

The Imports were a Chicago punk rock band that formed in 1980. In a response to a solicitation for information on influential people, bands, clubs, zines, etc., for a Chicago Punk History Radio Documentary in 2006, Steve Albini of Big Black listed The C*nts, The Imports, Coolest Retard, Wax Trax, and WZRD. Members of The Imports later went on to play with the Vagueleys, Silly Carmichaels (a pre-Ministry Al Jourgensen project), Sharkey's Machine, ¡Ack-Ack!, The Arms of Someone New, Split Heavens, Sylvia Darling and The Moon Seven Times.

== History ==
The Imports formed in 1979 in Chicago's South Side Hyde Park neighborhood. The band consisted of Ben Krug (vocals), Tom Krug (guitar) and Joe Strell (bass). The Imports went through a series of drummers including John Krug, Alec Dale, who accompanied the outfit through its transition from punk rock to post-punk, and finally Tom Wall.

During their brief career, the Imports played the nightclub circuit of Chicago's underground music scene, a scene they shared with other Chicago punk rock and/or new wave music bands such as Bohemia, C*nts, Da!, the Dadistics, Epicycle, the Ferraris, Heavy Manners, the Men, Naked Raygun, the Oil Tasters (from Milwaukee), Painter Band, Phil 'n' the Blanks, Poison Squirrel, Skafish, Special Affect, Static Cling, the Subverts (from Rockford), the Sweatermen, the Throbbers, the Trouble Boys, and the Vaguelys. As Ken Mierzwa writes in Ephemeral Creation: Music and Art in Chicago, 1978-1982, "none of the first batch of local bands ever enjoyed more than regional success". The nightclubs in which The Imports played included The Lucky Number, Tuts, Jamie's Elsewhere, and Exit. The majority of The Imports' band members were excluded from these venues on nights when they were not playing on account of being under the legal age for drinking, making it difficult for them to view acts who weren't on the same bill.

Initially, the Imports played a short pop punk set of originals inspired by late seventies American and British punk acts such as Iggy Pop, the New York Dolls, the Ramones, the Sex Pistols, The Clash, and The Jam. Their repertoire grew to over sixty originals, few of which ran much longer than two minutes. However, soon after their Chicago debut at the club Ann Arkees on March 6, 1980, the Imports gave up their high-intensity pop-punk style for a melancholic, brooding post-punk sound.

== Releases ==
While together, The Imports released only one professional recording: a 7-inch single on Cirkle Records, published in 1980 with the songs "Visions of Reality" and "Darkness of Light". These songs were recorded on a four-track reel-to-reel tape recorder in the Imports rehearsal space in the basement of the Krug's home in Hyde Park. The recording engineer was Andrew Clark, guitarist and vocalist of the band Epicycle. In order to achieve some manner of separation between tracks, each member of the band was sequestered in his own corner of the basement.
