= RTFM (album) =

Studio album by Poster Children
- Released: April 22, 1997
- Recorded: 1996, Pogo Studio, Champaign, Illinois
- Genre: Alternative rock
- Length: 44:58
- Label: Reprise Records
- Producer: Bryce Goggin, Poster Children

Poster Children chronology
Junior Citizen (1995)	RTFM (1997)	New World Record (1999)

Professional ratings
Review scores
Source	Rating
AllMusic	4/5 stars

RTFM is the fifth album by the American alternative rock band Poster Children, released in 1997. The title comes from the term RTFM, short for "Read The Fucking Manual". It was issued as an enhanced CD.

The band supported the album by touring with Failure.

== Production ==
The album was mixed using a Mac Quadra 650. The band recorded the album with the same lineup that recorded Junior Citizen; it was the first time in their existence that the exact same band members had appeared on two albums in a row.

== Critical reception ==
The New York Times wrote: "Years on the club circuit have made the band's lyrics ever more sardonic; in "Music of America" from their new album, RTFM (Reprise), Poster Children mock 'AM/FM trash, recycled every hour and converted into cash.'" The Chicago Tribune thought that "the quartet fuses swaggering power chords, home-brewed techno-delia, pop melodies and dissonant clatter into a distinctive, inviting wail."

== Track listing ==
1. "Blackdog" – 3:56
2. "Ofor1" – 3:35
3. "Music of America" – 2:24
4. "Dreamsmall" – 3:54
5. "Speed of Light" – 3:17
6. "King of the Hill" – 4:42
7. "21st Century" – 3:34
8. "Attack!" – 2:56
9. "Sleep" – 3:57
10. "Pearly Gates" – 4:50
11. "Afterglow" – 4:00
12. "Happenseveryday" – 3:53

== Personnel ==
- Bryce Goggin – Producer, Engineer
- Rick Valentin – Vocals, Guitar
- Rose Marshack – Bass, vocals
- Jim Valentin – Guitar
- Howie Kantoff – Drums
