= St. Christopher (band) =

British indie pop band

- Origin: York, England
- Genres: Indie pop
- Years active: 1984–present
- Labels: Sarah, Parasol, Vinyl Japan
- Members: Glenn Melia; Punky; Chris Goodhead; Ian Kay
- Past members: Terry Banks; Jim Fletcher; Mark Tranmer; Nic Robson

St. Christopher are a British indie pop group formed in York in 1984, who released several records on Sarah Records in the late 1980s, and have continued to release records since.

== History ==
St. Christopher are mainly known for their four singles and 10" mini-LP on Sarah Records, although they have a much longer history, both before and after their time on Sarah. They produced a prolific quantity of recordings on a variety of labels, from the early 1980s to the present.

The only constant member of the group during their more than twenty years of existence has been Glenn Melia and during this time, Melia and St. Christopher have recorded with many well-known indie labels, including Sarah, Bus Stop, Vinyl Japan, Elefant, Slumberland, Caff, and Parasol. The group probably achieved greatest recognition for the single "All of a Tremble", released in 1989.

The original line-up of the group also featured Terry Banks, who went on to lead Tree Fort Angst.

In 2007, a compilation album of their previous releases entitled Lost at Sea – The Sarah Recordings was released by Plastilina Records. Their last release was the CD single "Burnout".

== Discography ==
=== Singles ===
- "Crystal Clear"/"My Fond Farewell". 7" (1984) Bluegrass Records (GM001)
- "As Far As the Eye Can See"/"Awe". 7" Grrove & Move (GM002)
- "Go Ahead Cry . . ."/"Charmelle". 7" (1986) Groove & Move (GM003)
- Forevermore Starts Here. EP 7" flexi-disc (1987) Veston Records (VOD01)
- The Josephine Why? EP 7" flexi-disc (1988) Clarity Records
- "You Deserve More Than a Maybe"/"The Kind of Girl"/"The Summer You Love". 7" (1989) Sarah Records (SARAH15) (UK indie No. 13)
- "All of a Tremble"/"My Fortune"/"The Hummingbird". 7" (1989) Sarah Records (SARAH20) (UK indie No. 19)
- "All of a Tremble"/"Our Secret"/"Even the Sky Seems Blue". 7" (1989) The Bus Stop Label (BUS003)
- "Antoinette"/"Salvation". 7" (1990) Sarah Records (SARAH34)
- "Say Yes to Everything"/"It's Snowing on the Moon". 7" (1991) Sarah Records (SARAH46)
- Radio France Sessions. EP 7" (1993) Slumberland Records (SLR19)
- "Young Nun"/"With Her in Mind". 7" (1995) Elefant Records (ER122)
- "She Looks Like You"/"Ecstasy, Passion and Pain". 7" (1995) Elefant Records (ER142)
- "Burnout". 3" CD-R. (2008) Cloudberry Records (CLOUDBERRY 089)
- 'If Black Was Blue' (2009) Suzy Records 009

=== Albums ===
==== Studio albums ====
- Bacharach 10" (1990) Sarah Records (SARAH403)
- Man, I Could Scream LP/CD (1992) Vinyl Japan Records (ASK6)
- Love You to Pieces CD Vinyl (1994) Japan Records (ASK27)
- Lioness CD (1996) Vinyl Japan Records (ASKCD53)
- Golden Blue CD (2000) Parasol Records (PAR-CD043)
- Forevermore Starts Here 2 CDs (Cherry Red Records CDBRED637, 2014)

==== Live albums ====
- Ce Soir. CD (1995) Soiree Records (CD1)

==== Compilations ====
- Dig Deep Brother 1984–1990. CD (1993) Vinyl Japan (ASK26)
- Lost at Sea – The Sarah Recordings. CD (2007) Plastilina Records (PLAST006)
- The Stars Belong to Me CD, 2008 XYLO Records XYLO 6
- Forevermore Starts Here, 2CD (Cherry Red Records CDBRED637, 2014)
