= On the Offensive =

EP by Poster Children
- Released: September 21, 2004
- Genre: Alternative rock
- Length: 20:00
- Label: Hidden Agenda

Poster Children chronology
No More Songs About Sleep and Fire (2004)	On the Offensive (2004)	Grand Bargain! (2018)

On the Offensive is an EP released by Poster Children in 2004. It is composed of politically themed cover songs.

== Track listing ==
1. "Clampdown" – 3:17 (originally by the Clash)
2. "(We Don't Need This) Fascist Groove Thang" – 3:16 (originally by Heaven 17)
3. "The New World" – 3:33 (originally by X)
4. "Let's Have a War" – 2:06 (originally by Fear)
5. "Divide and Conquer" – 2:55 (originally by Hüsker Dü)
6. "Complicated Game" – 4:53 (originally by XTC)

== Reception ==
Pitchfork gave it 7.0. Allmusic gave it 3.5 stars, with Tim Sendra describing it as "an impassioned antiwar, anti-Bush statement...a fun listen". PopMatters gave it 6 stars, with Christine Klunk stating that it "shows The Poster Children at their sharpest and tightest".

== Personnel ==
- Rick Valentin – Vocals, Guitar
- Rose Marshack – Bass, vocals
- Jim Valentin – Guitar
- Matt Friscia – Drums
