= Sin-eater (disambiguation) =

A sin-eater is a person who consumes a ritual meal in order to spiritually take on the sins of a deceased person.

Sin-eater may also refer to:

- Sin-Eater (character), a Marvel Comics character
- Onimar Synn, also known as Sin-Eater, a DC Comics character
- Sin Eater, a character in the film The Incredible Journey of Doctor Meg Laurel
- The Sin Eater, also known as The Order, a 2003 film
- The Sin Eaters, a 2009 audiobook
- "Sin-Eaters" (song), a 2010 song by The National
- Geist: The Sin-Eaters, a 2009 role-playing game
- Sin Eater (Campisi novel), a 2020 novel by Megan Campisi

== See also ==
- The Last Sin Eater, a 1998 novel by Francine Rivers
  - The Last Sin Eater (film), a 2007 film based on the novel
- The Sin Eater's Daughter, a novel series by Melinda Salisbury
