= Grand Bargain! =

Studio album by Poster Children
- Released: May 18, 2018
- Recorded: July 30–31, 2016; July 29–30, 2017; August 25–26, 2017
- Studio: Electrical Audio, Chicago, Illinois, US
- Length: 33:49
- Language: English
- Label: Lotuspool Records
- Producer: Steve Albini

Poster Children chronology
On the Offensive (2004)	Grand Bargain! (2018)

“The big problem is time. For the bulk of the band, the way we wrote music (in the past) was we would get together with scraps of ideas, have a 12-hour rehearsal and hopefully a song would come out of it and then I would put lyrics on top of it.”

—Guitarist Rick Valentin on how recording is different for the band 30 years after forming.

Grand Bargain! is a 2018 studio album by American alternative rock band Poster Children, their first in 14 years and was promoted by the single "Grand Bargain" and a tour. The release received positive reviews from critics.

== Reception ==
Editors at AllMusic rated this album 4 out of 5 stars, with critic Mark Deming writing that "the reunion album is a much trickier matter" but noted that the songwriting is relevant and "reflects the social and political chaos of life in an increasingly divided nation" and the band "express themselves with an unpretentious intelligence and a laser-like focus" that "result[s in] a set of tunes that expresses itself with a ferocity that's not rancor for its own sake but the sound of a furious wake-up call to the nation they call home". Good Morning America named this the 42nd best album of 2018, where Allan Raible called it "a sharply appealing, politically-charged set".

== Track listing ==
All songs written by Poster Children.

1. "Grand Bargain" – 3:14
2. "Hippie Hills" – 3:26
3. "Lucky Ones" – 3:14
4. "World's Insane" – 3:09
5. "Devil and the Gun" – 4:20
6. "Better Than Nothing" – 2:26
7. "Brand New Country" – 2:54
8. "Better Place" – 2:12
9. "Final Offense" – 2:42
10. "Big Surprise" – 2:36
11. "Safe Tonight" – 3:42

== Personnel ==
Poster Children

- Matt Friscia – drums
- Rose Marshack – bass guitar, background vocals
- Jim Valentin – guitar, keyboards
- Rick Valentin – vocals, guitar, artwork

Additional personnel

- Steve Albini – recording, mixing
- Jon Fine – liner notes
- Nathan Keay – photography
- Bob Weston – audio mastering at Chicago Mastering Service

== See also ==
- 2018 in American music
- List of 2018 albums
