= RTM =

RTM may refer to:

== Organisations ==
- Réseau de transport métropolitain, legal name of Exo (public transit), transit operator in Greater Montreal
- Régie des Transports de Métropolitains, operator of the Marseille Metro
- RTM Restaurant Group
- Rotterdamse Tramweg Maatschappij, a former Dutch tram operator
- Royal Tyrone Militia, Irish militia regiment raised in 1793 for home defence and internal security during the French Revolutionary War

=== Media ===
- Radio Televisyen Malaysia
- Radio Thamesmead, London radio station, renamed Time 106.8
- Radiodiffusion-Télévision du Mali
- Right This Minute, a US TV program
- Radio-télévision marocaine (RTM), a former name of the Moroccan state-owned broadcaster now known as SNRT

== Places ==
- Rotterdam The Hague Airport, by IATA code

== Technology and Internet ==
- Release to manufacturing, of software
- Remember the Milk, calendar and reminder web service
- Restricted Transactional Memory, an Intel instruction set interface
- Robotics Technology Middleware
- Resin transfer molding, for making composite structures
- Read the manual, common texting initialism

== Other ==
- Representative town meeting, in some US states
- Right to manage, of a UK leaseholder
- Robert Tappan Morris, (b, 1965), US computer scientist
- Reconsolidation of Traumatic Memories, a therapeutic method
- 2026 Bay Area Regional Measure RTM, sales tax ballot measure
