= Flower Plower =

Studio album by Poster Children
- Released: 1989
- Recorded: Chicago Recording Company Chicago, Illinois
- Genre: Alternative rock
- Length: 42:08
- Label: Limited Potential

Poster Children chronology
Flower Plower (1989)	Daisychain Reaction (1991)

Professional ratings
Review scores
Source	Rating
Allmusic	3/5 stars

Flower Plower is the first studio album by American rock band Poster Children. Recorded in 1988–89, it was first released on vinyl by the Limited Potential label in 1989, and reissued on CD in 1991 by Frontier Records. Later the band acquired the rights to this album, and reissued it on their own label, 12 Inch Records, in 1999.

== Track listing (original LP release) ==
1. "Dangerous Life" – 2:06
2. "Wanna" – 2:41
3. "Byron's Song" – 3:53
4. "Eye" – 2:55
5. "Hollywood" – 1:40
6. "Modern Art" – 2:34
7. "Evidence" – 3:12
8. "She Walks" – 3:33

=== CD re-issue bonus tracks ===
9. "10,000 Pieces" – 3:02
10. "Question" – 3:16
11. "Non-Reggae Song" – 1:49
12. "Detective Tracy" – 3:29
13. "Bump Bump" – 2:14
14. "Jeremy Straight" – 2:20
15. "Rain on Me" – 3:36

== Personnel ==
Poster Children

- Rick Valentin – vocals, guitar
- Rose Marshack – bass, vocals
- Brendan Gamble – drums (tracks 1–4)
- Shannon Drew – drums (tracks 5–15)

Technical personnel

- Steve Albini – Engineer (tracks 1–4)
- Iain Burgess – Engineer (tracks 5–15)
