= Bully pulpit =

Prominent platform from which to easily advocate an agenda

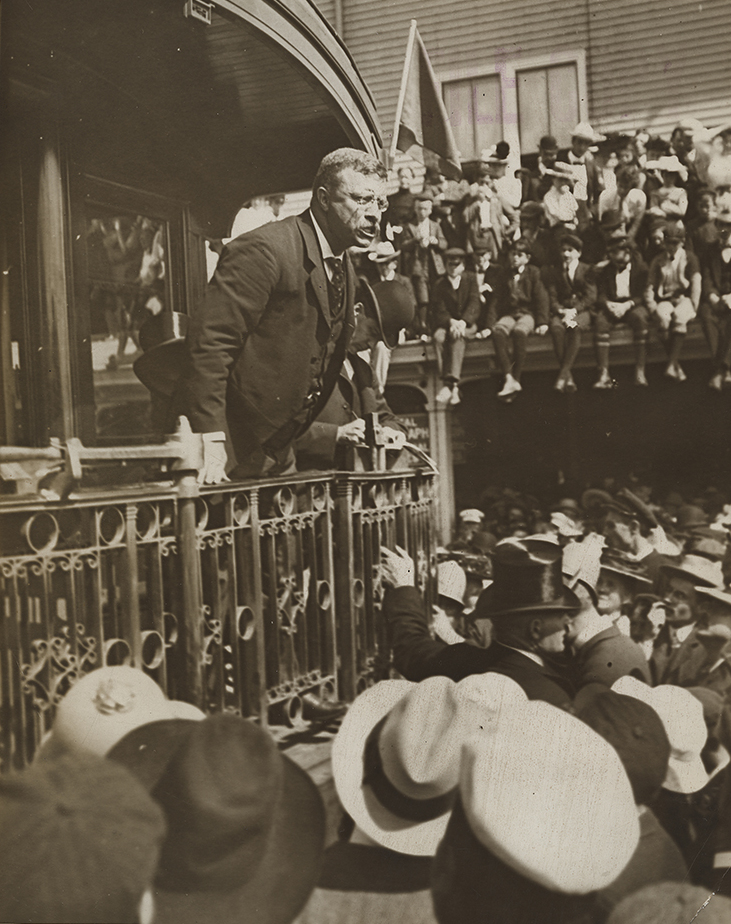
Theodore Roosevelt delivering a speech in 1902

A "bully pulpit" is a conspicuous position that provides an opportunity to speak out and be listened to.

The term was coined by United States President Theodore Roosevelt, who referred to his office as a "bully pulpit," by which he meant a good platform from which to advocate an agenda. Roosevelt used the word bully as an adjective meaning "superb" or "wonderful", a more common usage at that time.

The phrase was first printed in The New York Times in the year 1909.
