= Sin Eater (Campisi novel) =

2020 novel by Megan Campisi

- Cover of the 2020 Atria Books edition
- Author: Megan Campisi
- Language: English
- Publisher: Atria Books
- Publication date: 2020
- Dewey Decimal: 813.6
- LC Class: PS3603.A4885 S56

Sin Eater is a 2020 novel by American author Megan Campisi.

== Summary ==
The novel is set in an alternative history of Tudor 16th-century England, in the middle of an intense religious conflict. The novel follows a fourteen-year-old girl named Mary Owens, who is arrested after stealing a loaf of bread and is sentenced to become a sin-eater. These sin-eaters play an important religious in death ceremonies, hearing the final confessions of the dying and consuming ritual meals to absorb the sins of those confessions and free the dying. Shunned by society in day-to-day life, Mary is taken up by an older sin-eater, who begins teaching her the ways of sin-eating. However, after they are called to eat the sins of one of the ladies-in-waiting of the queen, they find that a deer's heart has been included in the ritual meal, signifying a sin of murder, despite the lady-in-waiting not having confessed to such a sin. The older sin-eater refuses to consume the heart, and is therefore arrested and tortured. Mary sets herself to undercovering who placed the heart there and why.

== Themes and analysis ==
In an interview with Ryan Asmussen of The Chicago Review of Books, Campisi stated that she consciously wrote Mary as a feminist symbol, saying that she "chose to chart an individual revolution in the way one woman views herself and her situation—a seemingly isolated act of rebellion in an unjust world. Feminism starts at home, with yourself, and grows from there."

== Critical reception ==
Kirkus Reviews gave the novel a positive review, describing it as "richly imaginative and strikingly contemporary." Mary Lawrence of the Historical Novel Society praised Campisi's "humor and deft characterization," adding that she "eschews strict historical fact and instead capitalizes on the time’s obsession with sin and the afterlife to build a world that feels fresh yet true to the conventions and beliefs of the time." Publishers Weekly described the novel as a "rousing, impressive debut, a bleak reimagining of palace intrigue in 16th-century England... a treat for fans of feminist speculative fiction."

Writing in The Washington Post, author Elizabeth Hand praised the novel as a "riveting depiction of hard-won female empowerment," while saying that "the mystery, while carefully plotted, is never quite as compelling as the characters and vibrant, Bruegelesque setting where it all unfolds."
