= Bikeride =

American indie rock band

- Origin: Long Beach, California
- Genres: Indie rock, garage rock
- Years active: 1994–2008
- Labels: Parasol Records, Hidden Agenda
- Members: Tony Carbone; Sean How; Adam Deibert; Chris Petrozzi
- Past members: Geff Campbell; Chris Fahey; Erick Hauser; Craig Hendricks; James Kochen; Greg Roberts; Bill Sipes; Ian Spalding; Charles Gray
- Website: http://www.myspace.com/bikeride

Bikeride was an American indie rock band fronted by Tony Carbone. Their record companies of the past have included is Hidden Agenda, a part of Parasol Records, and Choclaty! Records. Bikeride's newest album, The Kiss, has been released on SHMAMM! Records, Bikeride's own imprint.

== History ==
Bikeride was formed in 1994 by Tony Carbone (guitar, vocals), Bill Sipes (bass), and Craig Hendricks (drums) in Fountain Valley, CA. That lineup split by the end of the year. Ian Spalding joined up on bass and Greg Roberts took over drums. Both Ian and Greg had played with Carbone in high school as Catherine Wheel (before the British band of the same name) and as Chelsea Hotel. As a trio, they began work on Here Comes the Summer in the Fall of 1995. Half of Here Comes the Summer was recorded on 2-inch 24-track analog tape at Loyola Marymount University as Carbone's Senior thesis project (where Carbone met keyboardist Sean How), and half was recorded at home on a half-inch 8-track analog recorder. By the summer of 1996, Spalding and Roberts had moved away from Southern California and Sean How joined the band full time as keyboardist and back-up vocalist. Here Comes the Summer was finished by Carbone, How, and various other players and was released in June 1997 on Choclaty! Records, Bikeride's own imprint.

Here Comes the Summer caught the attention of Parasol Records who opted to release Bikeride's America's Favorite Omelettes EP and second album, Thirty-Seven Secrets I Only Told America on their Hidden Agenda label. Joining Carbone and How on rhythm were James Kochen on drums and Erick Hauser on bass. Recording of 37 Secrets... lasted throughout 1997 and 1998 and was finished in the spring of 1999. Upon its release, it became a college radio favorite. Soon after, Bikerde released two vinyl-only EPs of outtakes from their first two LP's- the Dogs EP (1999) and the Raspet EP (2000). Both EPs were released together with other tracks from B-sides as Summer Winners, Summer Losers in 2000 on Hidden Agenda.

By the end of 1999, Hauser and Kochen were replaced by Adam Deibert on bass and Chris Petrozzi on drums. Also joining the fold was Charles Gray on lead guitar. Adam and Charles were both members of The Aquabats and Petrozzi was singer and bassist for The Moseleys. From 2000 to 2002, Bikeride recorded their fourth album, Morning Macumba, at various studios in LA and Orange County. Many of the songs were written abroad while Charles and Tony were on vacation in Brazil and Peru. Upon Morning Macumba's release in the Summer of 2002, it was hailed as "a pop masterpiece" by allmusic, and favorably received by other publications but sales did not match the critics' appreciation.

Over the next four years Bikeride worked on their fifth album, The Kiss, released in March 2007.

Tony Carbone died from cancer March 6, 2008.

== Discography ==
=== Albums ===
- Here Comes the Summer (1997), Choclaty
- Thirty-Seven Secrets I Only Told America (1999), Hidden Agenda
- Summer Winners, Summer Losers (2000), Hidden Agenda
- Morning Macumba (2002), Hidden Agenda
- The Kiss (2007)

=== EPs ===
- America's Favorite Omelettes (1998), Hidden Agenda
- DOGS (2000), Hidden Agenda
- Raspet (2000), Hidden Agenda

The theme song to the web-cartoon Julius and Friends (based on the designs of Paul Frank), titled "Julius", is a rewritten and remixed version of "Jennifer" from the album "Thirty-Seven Secrets I Only Told America". The song Fine and Dandy from Summer Winners, Summer Losers was used in a Mitsubishi Outlander commercial in 2004.

Bikeride were chosen by Mojo magazine to cover "Being for the Benefit of Mr. Kite!" for their 40th anniversary Sgt. Pepper's Lonely Hearts Club Band tribute album, Sgt. Pepper...With a Little Help from His Friends. The disc was given away with the March 2007 issue.
