= Suneaters =

American rock band

- Origin: Kansas City, Missouri, U.S.
- Genres: Space rock, scientist rock, post-punk, alternative rock, psychedelic rock
- Years active: 2008–present
- Label: Lotuspool Records
- Members: Scott Hartley; Chris Lost; Michael Judd; Nick Carroll
- Past members: David Saab; Chris Cardwell
- Website: lotuspool.com

Suneaters are an American indie/pop/psychedelic rock band formed in Kansas City, Missouri in 2008. The band members include Scott Free, Chris Lost, Michael Judd, Nick Carroll, and Sam Goodell. Suneaters' debut LP "One" was released in October 2011 on Lotuspool Records, an independent record label started by Chris Lost in the early 1990s. The band claims the theme of its music is "smartass sincerity."

== History ==
Suneaters was formed by Chris Lost after returning to Kansas City following the fallout of Los Angeles-based glam rock band Dr.Doctor, which had consisted of Lost, Free, artist Mark Silverberg, and writer/actor Michael McMillian. Hoping to follow in Dr.Doctor's footsteps, Lost recruited Scott Hartley, a local Dadaist, to play bass, and David Saab, a poet and attorney, on drums, to form a trio known as Suneaters.

After releasing Suneaters I in 2011, an experiment in pop and psychedelic noise, Suneaters recorded Suneaters XIII in 2012, a soundtrack for McMillian's short film, Charlie 13. The band then focused on playing live, attempting to rely less on pedals/electronics for sound. Through this exercise, the band created a pop-esque album titled Suneaters II: Loving Relationship. For this album, released in 2015, Hartley and Lost recruited Chris Cardwell and Michael Judd.

To promote Suneaters II: Loving Relationship, W. Dave Keith created a video version of the album just titled "Loving Relationship".

For their latest album, "Suneaters IV: Absinthe Makes The Heart Grow Fingers", they recruited legendary Lawrence, KS punk rock bar owner and musician, Nick Carroll to sing, play drums, and various other instruments. Carroll opened The Replay Lounge in 1993, which has been a destination for all live musical forms since its origin.

Suneaters cite their primary musical influences as SST Records, Led Zeppelin, Hanatarash, Flipper, INXS, Kool Keith, and Graham Nash.

== Band members ==
=== Current members ===
- Scott Free – vocals, bass, synthesizers, percussion (2008–present)
- Chris Lost – vocals, guitar, synthesizers, percussion (2008–present)
- Michael Judd – vocals, guitar, keyboards (2015–present)
- Nick Carroll – vocals, drums, percussion, guitar (2020–present)
- Sam Goodell – piano, keyboards, synthesizers (2020–present)

=== Former members ===
- David Saab – vocals, drums (2008–2014)
- Chris Cardwell – vocals, drums, percussion (2015–2019)

== Discography ==
- Suneaters I (2011)
- Suneaters XIII (2012)
- Suneaters II: Loving Relationship (2015)
- Suneaters XII: L'appel Du Vide (2017)
- Suneaters III: Unfathomable Darkness (2019)
- Suneaters XI: It's The Future (2020)
- Suneaters IV: Absinthe Makes The Heart Grow Fingers (2022)
- Suneaters X: Live (2025)
- Suneaters V: Heroic Dose (2026)
