= Poster Children =

American indie rock band

- Origin: Champaign, Illinois, USA
- Genres: Alternative rock, indie rock, punk rock, post-hardcore
- Years active: 1987–present
- Labels: Frontier, Reprise, Sire/Warner Bros., spinART, Hidden Agenda, Lotuspool Records
- Members: Rose Marshack; Jim Valentin; Rick Valentin; Matt Friscia
- Past members: John Herndon; Jeff Dimpsey; Howie Kantoff
- Website: https://posterchildren.com/

Poster Children is an American indie rock band formed at the University of Illinois Urbana-Champaign in 1987. They have issued nine studio albums and two EPs. Known for their strong DIY ethic, the band members continue to drive their own tour bus, create their own artwork and T-shirt designs, and operate their own record label. Poster Children were also pioneers in several forms of electronic technology relating to performance art, including enhanced CDs, webcasts, and blogs.

== History ==
Rick Valentin and Rose Marshack met in the mid-eighties at the University of Illinois and formed several bands in rapid succession. When the two met drummer Shannon Drew in 1987, their like-minded enthusiasm sparked the beginning of a new band, dubbed Poster Children. As Valentin explained in November 1991:

When I started listening to bands that weren't on Top 40 radio, I realized there could be music I liked that isn't really polished and shiny... There was this whole other world where people who just like music could just start a band and just play. You didn't have to be great. You could make up for technical talent with energy and directness. It was the realization that 'Hey, I can do this.'

— Rick Valentin, in The New York Times, 1991

They began selling their first album Toreador Squat on cassette and playing clubs in the Midwest. The following year, the band recorded songs with producer Iain Burgess, followed by five more songs produced with Steve Albini: the resulting album Flower Plower was released in 1989 on the Limited Potential label. It was also at this time that Poster Children picked up a second guitarist in order to complete their four-piece configuration.

A major label record deal was signed with Warner Bros. Records subsidiary Reprise Records. Over the next few albums, Poster Children would be shuffled from imprint to imprint within the Warner organization. Tracks for Daisychain Reaction were recorded by Steve Albini at the Chicago Recording Company in 1990, but due to financial difficulties at the label, the album was not released until the following year. The album included Hum bassist Jeff Dimpsey on guitar.

In 1991 Rick's brother, Jim, replaced Dimpsey, and remains to this day. Tool of the Man was recorded in 1992 at Dreamland Studio in New York with John Herndon (celebrated Tortoise percussionist) on drums. Tool of the Man was also released in the UK on the Creation label. The track "Clock Street" was picked as their only UK single to date. Just Like You and Junior Citizen followed, with modest but consistent sales. Matt Friscia auditioned for the band in 1993 as a high school student willing to drop out to go on tour, but the band didn't want to contribute to his delinquency, and hired Howie Kantoff instead. Friscia was available again in 2001 when the band was searching for its seventh (and current) drummer.

The band was on the second stage for Lollapalooza in 1995.

Rick Valentin and Rose Marshack are married and have hosted the long running podcast Radio Zero since 1999. They both are professors in the Arts Technology program at Illinois State University.

== Music ==
Poster Children usually write their music collectively, leaving Rick to create lyrics after the fact. During the band's formative years, they wrote and recorded with a different drummer for each album. This resulted in a fluctuating style that touched on pop punk, post hardcore, what the band refers to as "post wave", and new wave revival. Their music is made up of angular, overdriven guitar parts, strong basslines, and powerful yet intricate drums. The typical Poster Children song is high-energy and hard, yet melodic, and they often use unusual time signatures. Rick Valentin's lyrics are by turns witty and introspective, often obliquely related to political issues.

Poster Children have not had much commercial success or industry recognition, but critics consistently describe the band as catchy, impressive, and underrated. Despite their longevity, "the Poster Children don't have it in them to make a bad album", according to Christopher Hess in a 2000 record review. The band's "unique brand of smart pop-punk" makes them "definitely one of the more underrated college-rock bands to emerge in the '90s".

== Other music projects ==
Marshack and the Valentin brothers have continued to work with former drummer Howie Kantoff outside of the Poster Children lineup. The four have recorded techno and electronic music under the name Salaryman. The group has released three studio albums: Salaryman (1997); Karoshi (1999); and The Electric Forest (2006).

Since 2012 Rick Valentin also fronts a solo project named Thoughts Detecting Machines (TDM). Under this project he has released two EP's titled An Introduction to (2012); and Forget (2013), along with two albums Work the Circuits (2015) and Sound, Noise, & You (2019). When he performs live under this project, he places three screens vertically in front of himself onstage. The contents of each screen is provided by a camera placed behind each screen, which point at him while he plays guitar and sings along with backing tracks via laptop.

== Band members ==
Current members

- Rose Marshack – bass guitar, backing vocals (1987–present)
- Rick Valentin – vocals, guitar (1987–present)
- Jim Valentin – guitar (1991–present)
- Matt Friscia – drums (2001–present)

Past members

- Shannon Drew – drums (1987–1988)
- Brendan Gamble – drums (1988–1989)
- Mike Rader – drums (1989–1990)
- Jeff Dimpsey – guitar (1989–1991)
- Bob Rising – drums (1990–1991)
- John Herndon – drums (1991–1993)
- Howie Kantoff – drums (1993–2001)

Timeline

== Discography ==
=== Studio albums ===
- Toreador Squat (demo, Trashcan Records [Poster Children], 1989)
- Flower Plower (Frontier, 1989)
- Daisychain Reaction (Sire/Reprise, 1991)
- Tool of the Man (Sire, 1993)
- Junior Citizen (Sire, 1995)
- RTFM (Reprise, 1997)
- New World Record (spinART, 1999)
- DDD (spinART, 2000)
- No More Songs About Sleep and Fire (Hidden Agenda, 2004)
- Grand Bargain! (Lotuspool, 2018)

=== Compilations ===
- Light into Dark (Halo, 1989)
- Copyright (2001)

=== EPs ===
- Just Like You (Warner Bros., 1994)
- On the Offensive (Hidden Agenda, 2004)

=== DVD ===
- Zero Stars (Hidden Agenda, 2001)

=== Videos ===
- "If You See Kay" (1991)
- "Clock Street" (1993)
- "Dynamite Chair" (1993)
- "What's Inside the Box" (1994)
- "Junior Citizen" (1995)
- "He's My Star" (1995)
- "Superhero" (1996)
- "21st Century" (1997)
- "6 × 6" (1999)
- "This Town Needs a Fire" (2000)
- "Western Springs" (2003)
- "Grand Bargain" (2018)
- "Lucky Ones" (2018)
- "The Devil and the Gun" (2019)
