= Daisychain Reaction =

Studio album by Poster Children
- Released: 1991
- Recorded: 1991
- Studio: Chicago Recording Company, Chicago, Illinois
- Genre: Alternative rock, post-hardcore
- Length: 40:05
- Label: Twin/Tone Records
- Producer: Steve Albini, Poster Children

Poster Children chronology
| Flower Plower (1989) | Daisychain Reaction (1991) | Tool of the Man (1993) |

Professional ratings
Review scores
| Source | Rating |
|---|---|
| Allmusic | 4/5 stars |
| Rolling Stone | 2/5 stars |

Daisychain Reaction is the second album by American alternative rock band Poster Children. It was originally released in 1991 on Twin/Tone Records, and reissued by Sire/Reprise in 1992. It was out of print until 2016 when a 25th anniversary edition was released on vinyl by Lotuspool Records. The album also spawned the band's first-ever music video, for "If You See Kay".

== Track listing ==
1. "Dee" – 4:06
2. "Cancer" – 2:24
3. "If You See Kay" – 2:50
4. "Love" – 2:51
5. "Freedom Rock" – 2:34
6. "Space Gun" – 5:12
7. "Water" – 4:07
8. "Want It" – 1:37
9. "Carver's" – 3:00
10. "Chain Reaction" – 4:40
11. "Frustration" – 1:58
12. "Where We Live" – 4:43

== Personnel ==
Poster Children

- Rick Valentin – vocals, guitar
- Rose Marshack – bass, vocals
- Jeff Dimpsey – guitar
- Bob Rising – drums

Technical personnel

- Steve Albini – Engineer
- Jay Miller – cover art
