= Lanterna =

Musical project led by Irish-American guitarist Henry Frayne

- Origin: Champaign, Illinois, United States
- Genres: Instrumental rock, post-rock, ambient, new-age
- Years active: 1990-present
- Labels: Badman Recording Co./Jemez Mountain
- Members: Henry Frayne, Eric Gebow, Brian Krumm, Nick Macri, Mike Brosco, Louie Simon, Nikos Diamandopoulos, Vasilis “Billy” Serdeniotis
- Past members: Brendan Gamble, Lynn Canfield
- Website: lanterna.tv/

Lanterna is a musical project led by guitarist Henry Frayne, formerly of Lodestone Destiny, The Syndicate, Ack-Ack, Area and The Moon Seven Times. Their tracks are evocative soundscapes, usually instrumental, that focus on Frayne's melodic guitar work awash in effects.

== History ==
The first material released under the name Lanterna was a collaboration between Frayne, drummer Brendan Gamble and vocalist Lynn Canfield which the band self-released in 1992. Some of these tracks reappeared later that year on the Greek vinyl-only, Elfish label release Of Shapes That Haunt Thought's Wilderness. The recordings were re-released on both Parasol Records and Rykodisc in 1995 and 1998, respectively. The Rykodisc version led off with the song "Silent Hills." The track later appeared on the first disc of National Public Radio's "All Songs Considered" CD series, which collected songs used as interstitial music during All Things Considered. Five albums followed on Badman/Jemez Mountain.

== Discography ==
- Lanterna limited edition boxed cassette (self-released, 1992)
- Of Shapes That Haunt Thought's Wilderness (Elfish, 1993)
- Lanterna (Parasol, 1995)
- Lanterna (Rykodisc, 1998)
- Scenic/Lanterna Live (split EP with Scenic, Parasol, 1998)
- Elm Street (Badman Recording Co., 2001)
- Sands (Badman RecordingCo., 2002)
- Highways (Badman Recording Co., 2004)
- Desert Ocean (Badman Recording Co./Jemez Mountain, 2006)
- Backyards (Badman Recording Co./Jemez Mountain, 2015)
- Hidden Drives (Badman Recording Co., 2021)
