= Stell (surname) =

Stell is a surname. Notable people with the surname include:

- Aaron Stell (1911–1996), American film editor
- Barry Stell (born 1961), English footballer
- Christopher Stell (1929–2014), Architectural historian noted for his work on English nonconformist chapels
- Gypsie Ann Evarts Stell (1927–2023), American film and television actress (better known as Phyllis Coates)
- Joe Stell (1928–2020), American politician
- Philip Stell (1934–2004), British surgeon and historian

== See also ==
- Stell Andersen (1897–1989), international concert pianist
- Stell Haggas (1856–1926), English first-class cricketer
- Robert Stell Heflin (1815–1901), American legislator for Georgia and Alabama
- Stell (musician) (born 1995), Filipino musician, known as a member of boy band SB19
