= RTFM =

Initialism for "read the fucking manual"

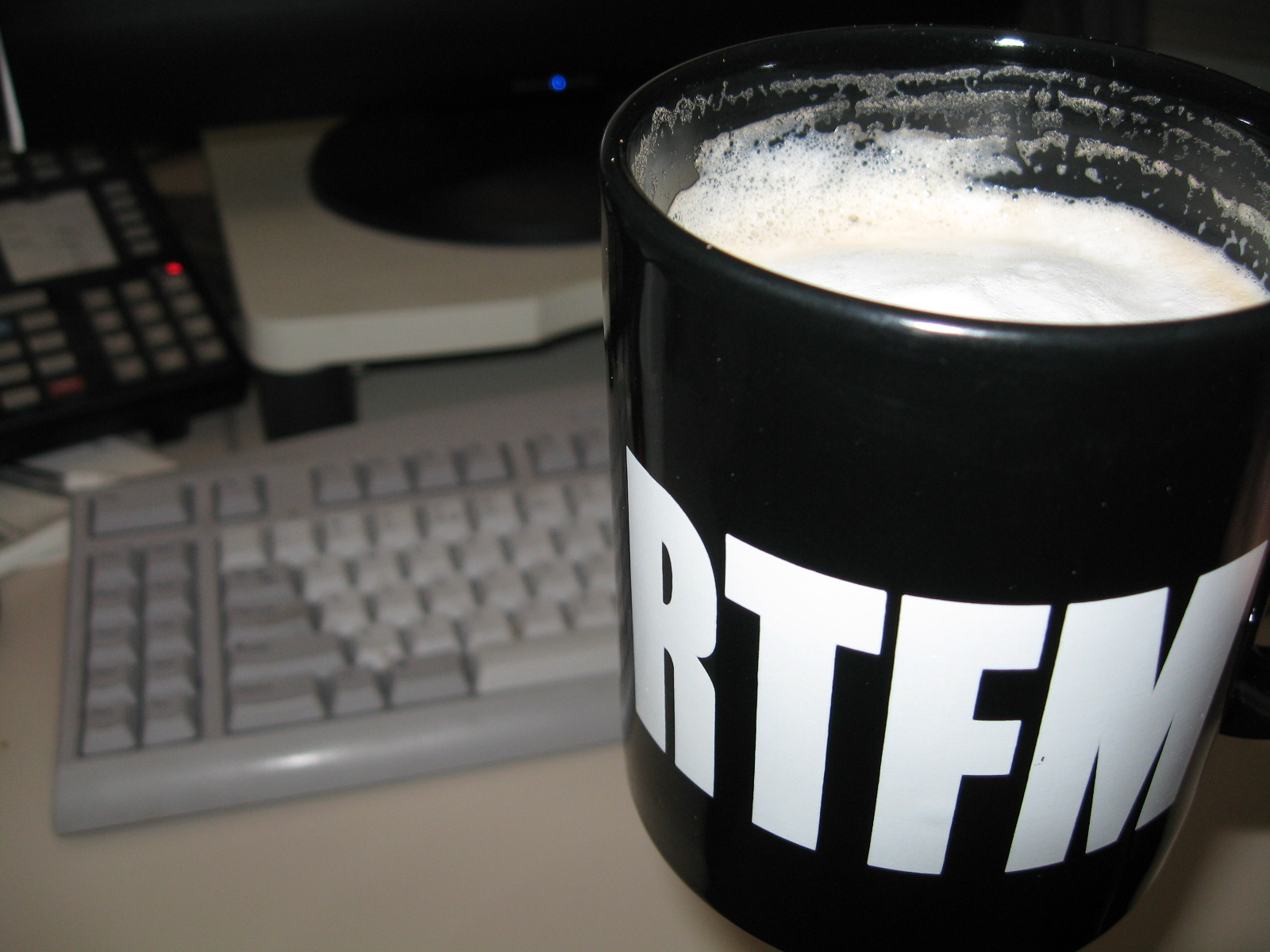
A mug labelled 'RTFM'

RTFM is an initialism and internet slang for the expression "read the fucking manual", typically used to reply to a basic question where the answer is easily found in the documentation, user guide, owner's manual, man page, online help, internet forum, software documentation or FAQ.

Usage is variously viewed as a pointed reminder of etiquette to try to find a solution before posting to a mass forum or email alias; helping a newer user (colloquially and demeaningly referred to as a noob within internet culture) to improve themselves; as a useless response; or as a hostile and elitist response. Polite usages would mention where one has looked when asking a question, and to provide an exact location or link where exactly to RTFM.

In expurgated texts, substitutions such as "read the frickn' manual", "read the factory manual", "read the field manual", "read the flaming manual", "read the fine manual", "read the friendly manual", "read the [pause] manual" or similar variants are used.

If there is no appropriate content in the manual but the answer is frequently seen in the forum, a similar response in internet culture might be to "lurk moar", meaning to observe the forum for a time before asking questions.

== List of similar initialisms ==
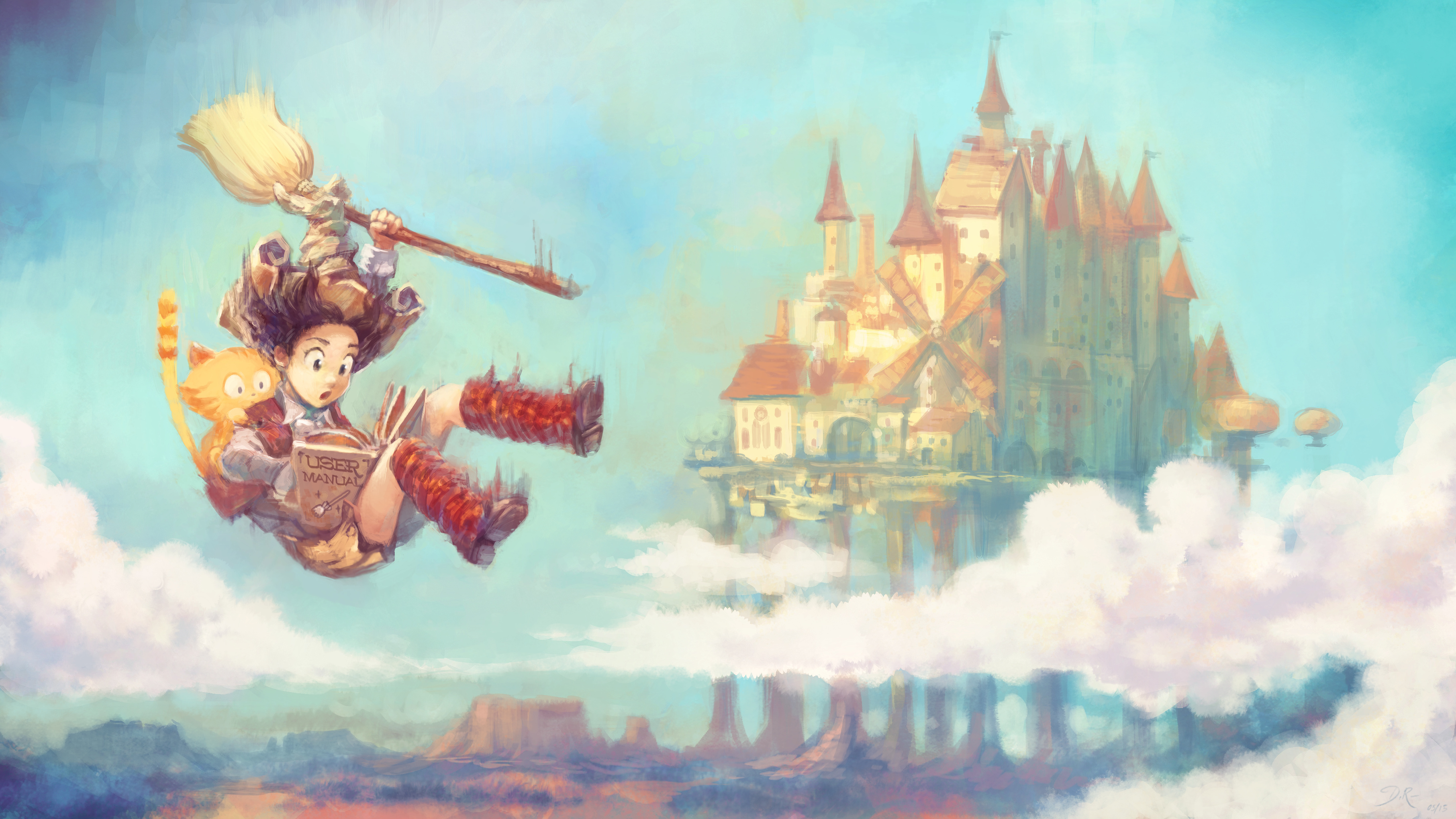
Illustration of the phrase by David Revoy

- WABM – "write a better manual" – an answer complaining that the manual is not written well
- LMGTFY – "let me Google that for you", a sarcastic response used to indicate that a person asking a question should have searched the web for the answer themselves.

== See also ==
- user error § Acronyms and other names
