= Parasol Records =

Independent record label of Urbana, Illinois

Parasol Records is an American independent record label based in Urbana, Illinois. The label was founded by Geoff Merritt as an outgrowth of the catalog Parasol Mail Order (which was started in 1991). The Parasol Records banner also includes the smaller labels associated with it including Mud, Spur, Hidden Agenda and Galaxy Gramophone.

The majority of Parasol's releases have been indie pop, CD, and 7" vinyl singles. Artists signed to Parasol Records include: 16 Tons, The 1900s, 7% Solution, Absinthe Blind, Acid House Kings, The Action, AK-Momo, Mark Bacino, Bikeride, Brian Leach, Matt Bruno, Budgie Jacket, Busytoby, C-Clamp, Doleful Lions, Elsinore, Honcho Overload, Hot Glue Gun, Lanterna, The Moon Seven Times, Neilson Hubbard, Hum, Jack & the Beanstalk, Jenifer Jackson, Ryan Groff, Sugarbuzz, and others.

Merritt and his friend Ric Menck (Velvet Crush) also run Reaction Recordings—best known for the "Songs of the Pogo" (Walt Kelly and Norman Monath) re-release along with re-releases from The Action, The Vertebrats, Crippled Pilgrims, and Richard Lloyd.

== See also ==
- List of record labels
