= List of people from Champaign, Illinois =

The following list includes notable people who were born or have lived in Champaign, Illinois. For a similar list organized alphabetically by last name, see the category page People from Champaign, Illinois.

== Business, science, and engineering ==
Name	Image	Birth	Death	Known for	Association	Reference
Scott Anderson		Jun 26, 1913	Oct 1, 2006	Physicist	President of the Rotary Club of Champaign (1963 to 1964); founder of the Urban League of Champaign County	
Marc Andreessen		Jul 9, 1971		Co-author of Mosaic and founder of Netscape	Graduate of the University of Illinois at Urbana–Champaign	
John Bardeen		May 23, 1908	Jan 30, 1991	Electrical engineer and physicist; two time Nobel Prize winner in Physics	Professor at the University of Illinois at Urbana–Champaign	
Steve Chen		Aug 18, 1978		Co-founder of YouTube	Graduate of the University of Illinois at Urbana–Champaign	
Jawed Karim		Jan 1, 1979		Co-founder of YouTube	Graduate of the University of Illinois at Urbana–Champaign	
Tony Khan		Oct 10, 1982		Founder of All Elite Wrestling	Born in Champaign	
Anthony James Leggett		Mar 26, 1938	Mar 8, 2026	Physicist; Nobel Prize winner in Physics	Professor at the University of Illinois at Urbana–Champaign	
Jimmy John Liautaud		Jan 12, 1964		Jimmy John's owner, founder, & chairman		
W. Dwight Pierce		Nov 16, 1881	Apr 29, 1967	Entomologist	Born in Champaign	
Jerry Sanders		Sep 12, 1936		Founder and CEO of Advanced Micro Devices	Graduate of the University of Illinois at Urbana–Champaign	
Lewis Hastings Sarett		Dec 22, 1917	Nov 29, 1999	Inventor of synthetic cortisone	Born in Champaign	
James Tobin		Mar 5, 1918	Mar 11, 2002	Laureate of the Nobel prize in economics (1981)	Born in Champaign	
Stephen Wolfram		Aug 29, 1959		Founder of Wolfram Research, makers of Mathematica	Professor at the University of Illinois at Urbana–Champaign	

== Crime ==
Name	Image	Birth	Death	Known for	Association	Reference
Steven Phillip Kazmierczak		Aug 26, 1980	Feb 14, 2008	Perpetrator in the Northern Illinois University shooting	Attended the University of Illinois at Urbana–Champaign	
Michael H. Kenyon				Convicted criminal; nicknamed the "Enema Bandit"	Graduate of the University of Illinois at Urbana–Champaign	
Karyn Hearn Slover			Sep 27, 1996	1996 murder victim		

== Media and arts ==
Name	Image	Birth	Death	Known for	Association	Reference
David Ayer		Jan 18, 1968		Filmmaker	Born in Champaign	
Irving Azoff		Dec 12, 1947		Music promotion	Attended UIUC, started Blytham Ltd with Bob Nutt	
Marc Beeson		Dec 20, 1954		Country music singer and songwriter	Born in Champaign	
Ian Blurton		1965		Canadian musician and record producer	Born in Champaign	
Tom Bodett		Feb 23, 1955		Author, voiceover actor, and spokesman	Born in Champaign	
Harold Bradley Jr.		Oct 13, 1929		Former American football player and actor, singer, artist, TV host (WCIA Channel 3, WICD Channel 15) and painter	Lived 19 years in Champaign	
Iris Chang		Mar 28, 1968	Nov 9, 2004	Author (The Rape of Nanking)	Graduate of the University of Illinois at Urbana–Champaign	
Amy Chua		Oct 26, 1962		Author (Battle Hymn of the Tiger Mother)	Born in Champaign	
Mike Connolly		1914	Nov 19, 1966	Magazine reporter and Hollywood gossip columnist for The Hollywood Reporter	Attended University of Illinois at Urbana–Champaign, where he was city editor of the Daily Illini, the independent student-run newspaper, known for his 1937–38 crusade against prostitution in Champaign	
Jeremih Felton		Jul 17, 1987		R&B singer	Attended the University of Illinois at Urbana–Champaign	
Hart D. Fisher				Comic book creator and publisher	Born in Champaign	
Michael Fumento				Journalist and author of The Myth of Heterosexual AIDS	Born in Champaign	
Bill Geist		May 10, 1945		CBS News correspondent and author	Born in Champaign	
Nathan Gunn		Nov 26, 1970		Operatic baritone; one of People magazine's 2008 Sexiest Men Alive	Graduate of the University of Illinois at Urbana–Champaign	
Steven Hager		May 25, 1951		Magazine editor	Born in Champaign	
Bruce Hall		Mar 5, 1953		Bass guitar player (REO Speedwagon)	Born in Champaign	
Stuart Hamm		Feb 8, 1960		Bass guitar player	Grew up in Champaign	
Laura Kakoma (a.k.a. Somi)		June 6, 1981		Singer, songwriter, actor and playwright	Born in Champaign	
Megyn Kelly		Nov 18, 1970		Journalist, political commentator, and former corporate defense attorney	Born in Champaign	
Alison Krauss		Jul 23, 1971		Bluegrass singer	Grew up in Champaign	
Ludacris		Sep 11, 1977		Rapper	Born in Champaign	
Marcella Martin		Jun 5, 1916	Oct 31, 1986	Actress	Born in Champaign	
Jack McDuff		Sep 17, 1926	Jan 23, 2001	Jazz musician	Born in Champaign	
Jeff Mondak		Mar 26, 1962		Children's poet and songwriter	Lives in Champaign	
David Foster Wallace		Feb 21, 1962	Sep 12, 2008	Author of Infinite Jest	Lived in Champaign	
George Will		May 4, 1941		Pulitzer Prize-winning journalist and author	Born in Champaign	
Douglas Wilson				Interior designer and television personality (Trading Spaces)	Graduate of the University of Illinois at Urbana–Champaign	
Louise Woodroofe		Jan 28, 1892	Feb 15, 1996	Painter and University of Illinois professor	Born and grew up in Champaign, attended University of Illinois at Urbana–Champaign	

=== Bands ===
Name	Image	Founded	Disbanded	Music	Association	Reference
The Beauty Shop		1999	2008	Alt-country band	Formed in Champaign	
Braid		1993		Rock band	Formed in Champaign	
Champaign		1981		R&B, soft rock group	Formed in Champaign	
Headlights		2004	2012	Indie rock band	Formed in Champaign	
Hostyle Gospel		2003		Christian hip hop	Formed in Champaign	
Hum		1989		Alternative rock group	Formed in Champaign	
Pacifica Quartet		1994		2008 Grammy-winning string quartet	Quartet-in-Residence at the University of Illinois School of Music, 2003–2012	
Poster Children		1987		Rock group	Formed in Champaign	
REO Speedwagon		1967		Rock group	Formed in Champaign	
Starcastle		1969	2006	Rock group	Formed in Champaign	

== Politics ==
Name	Image	Birth	Death	Known for	Association	Reference
Kamala Harris		Oct 20, 1964		Vice president of the United States	Lived in Champaign	
Mark Kirk		Sep 15, 1959		United States senator	Born in Champaign	
Vashti McCollum		Nov 6, 1912	Aug 20, 2006	Plaintiff in the landmark 1948 Supreme Court case McCollum v. Board of Education	Lived and died in Champaign	
William B. McKinley		Sep 5, 1856	Dec 7, 1926	United States senator, 1912 campaign manager for President William Howard Taft	Lived in Champaign, attended University of Illinois at Urbana–Champaign	

== Religion ==
Name	Image	Birth	Death	Known for	Association	Reference
Henry Herman Meyer		Nov 21, 1874	1951	American Methodist Episcopal clergyman and editor	Born in Champaign	

== Sports ==
Name	Image	Birth	Death	Known for	Association	Reference
Chantal Bailey		May 28, 1965		Olympic speed skater	Born in Champaign	
Walter "Boom-Boom" Beck		Oct 16, 1904	May 7, 1987	Pitcher for six Major League Baseball teams	Lived and died in Champaign	
Bonnie Blair		Mar 18, 1964		Speed skater, Olympic gold medalist	Grew up in Champaign	
Harold Bradley Jr.		Oct 13, 1929	Apr 13, 2021	Former American football player and actor, singer, artist, TV host (WCIA Channel 3, WICD Channel 15) and painter.	Lived 19 years in Champaign	
Fred Brainard		Feb 17, 1892	Apr 17, 1959	Infielder for the New York Giants	Born in Champaign	
Don Branson		Jun 2, 1920	Nov 12, 1966	Indy-car driver		
Jacob Bushue		May 15, 1992		Soccer player	Born in Champaign	
Dick Butkus		Dec 9, 1942	Oct 5, 2023	Football linebacker for the Fighting Illini	Attended UIUC	
Steve Dunn		Apr 18, 1970		First baseman for the Minnesota Twins	Born in Champaign	
Matt Herges		Apr 1, 1970		Pitcher for eight Major League Baseball teams	Born in Champaign	
Reggie Hodges		Jan 26, 1982		Punter for the Cleveland Browns	Born in Champaign	Raised in Champaign, graduate of Centennial High School
Bershawn Jackson		May 8, 1983		Olympic 400M hurdler	Lives in Champaign	
Rhaka Khan		Dec 25, 1981		Wrestler with the WWE	Born in Champaign	
Jonathan Kuck		Mar 14, 1990		Speed skater and silver medalist in the 2010 Winter Olympics	Attending University of Illinois at Urbana–Champaign	
Don Laz		May 17, 1929	Feb 21, 1996	Pole vaulter; Olympic silver medalist		
Jeremy Leman		Mar 1, 1985		Linebacker for Illinois Illini and six NFL teams	Born and lives in Champaign	
Mikel Leshoure		Mar 30, 1990		Running back for the Detroit Lions	Graduated from Centennial High School in Champaign	
Troy Mattes		Aug 26, 1975		Pitcher for the Montreal Expos	Born in Champaign	
Tyler McGill		Aug 18, 1987		Swimmer, US Olympic team 2012	Born in Champaign	
Big Jeff Pfeffer		Mar 31, 1882	Dec 19, 1954	Pitcher for the Chicago Cubs, Boston Beaneaters/Doves and Boston Rustlers	Born in Champaign	
Roy Radebaugh		Feb 22, 1881	Jan 17, 1945	Pitcher for the St. Louis Cardinals	Born in Champaign	
Katherine Reutter		Jul 30, 1988		Short track speed skater, Olympic silver medalist	Born in Champaign	
Rayvonte Rice		Jul 14, 1992		Starting guard for the Illinois Fighting Illini men's basketball team	Born in Champaign	
Bob Richards		Feb 20, 1926	Feb 26, 2023	Pole vaulter; Olympic gold medalist		
Adam Seward		Jun 15, 1982		Linebacker for the Carolina Panthers	Born in Champaign	
Emily Stevenson		Jul 26, 1925	Dec 30, 2012	Backup catcher in the All-American Girls Professional Baseball League	Born in Champaign	
