= Henry Meyer =

Henry Meyer may refer to:

- Henry Meyer (poet) (1840–1925), American poet
- Henry Albert Meyer (1894–1968), American philatelist
- Henry Cord Meyer (1912–2001), American historian
- Henry D. Meyer, owner of Meyer's department store
- Henry H. Meyer (1874–1951), American Methodist Episcopal clergyman and editor
- Henry Hoppner Meyer (1780–1847), English portrait painter and engraver

== See also ==
- Henry Maier (1918–1994), American politician and mayor of Milwaukee, Wisconsin
- Henry Mayer (disambiguation)
