= Concrete shell =

Structure composed of a relatively thin shell of concrete

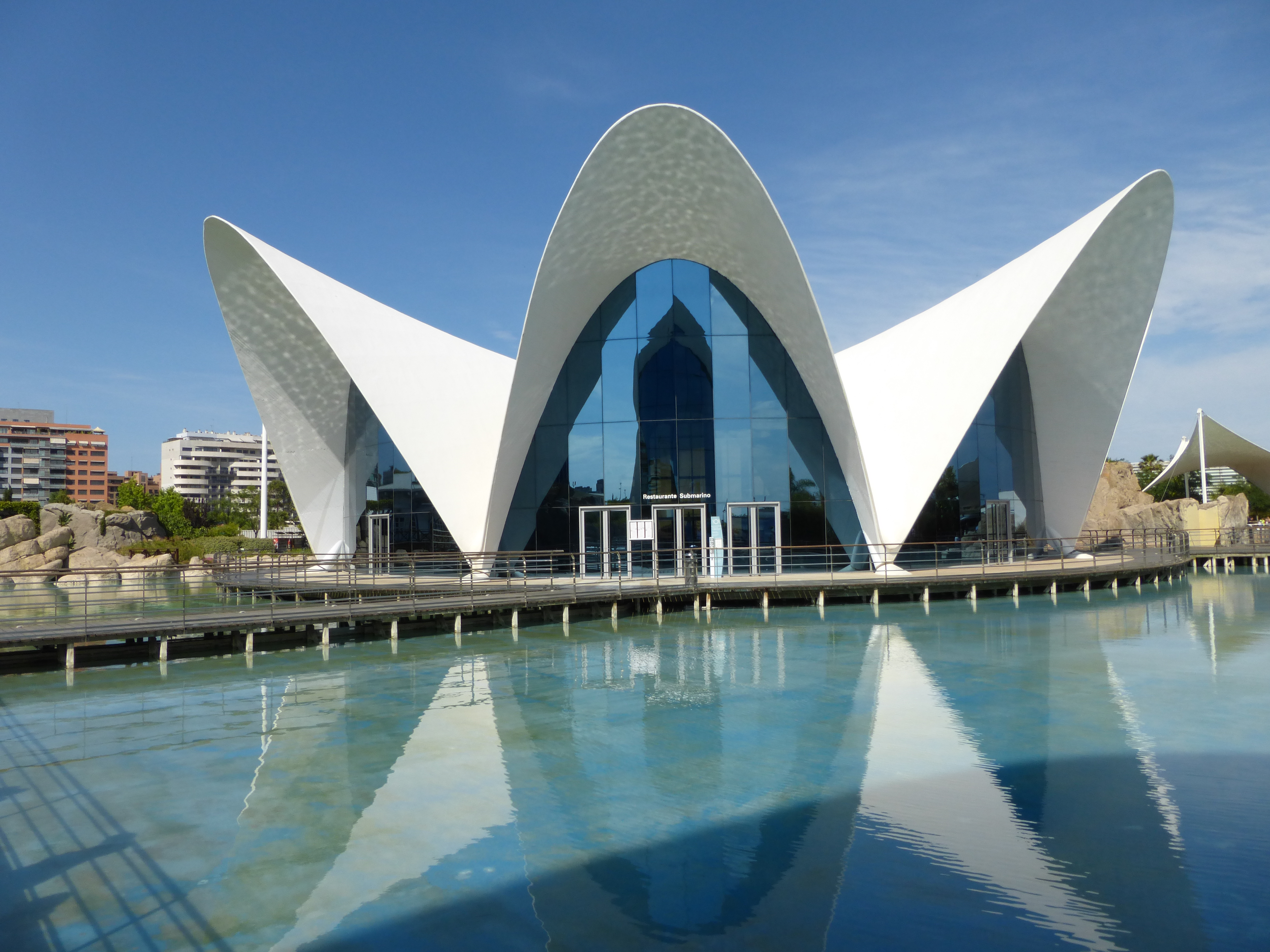
The Oceanografic, Valencia

A concrete shell, also commonly called thin shell concrete structure, is a structure composed of a relatively thin shell of concrete, usually with no interior columns or exterior buttresses. The shells are most commonly monolithic domes, but may also take the form of hyperbolic paraboloids, ellipsoids, cylindrical sections, or some combination thereof. The first concrete shell dates back to the 2nd century.

== Uses ==
Most concrete shell structures are roofs. Concrete shell construction techniques are well suited for complex curves and are also used to build boat hulls (called ferroconcrete). Historically, it was used by the British to create the Mulberry Harbours for the 1944 D-Day invasion of Normandy.

== Advantages ==
Like the arch, the curved shapes often used for concrete shells are naturally strong structures, allowing wide areas to be spanned without the use of internal supports, giving an open, unobstructed interior. The use of concrete as a building material reduces both materials cost and construction costs, as concrete is relatively inexpensive and easily cast into compound curves. Steel is often used in conjunction with concrete to reinforce the structure. The resulting structure may be immensely strong and safe; modern monolithic dome houses and the Miami Marine Stadium withstood hurricanes, and concrete shell structures survived the 1985 Mexico City earthquake. Concrete shells are widely considered to be strong enough to withstand even F5 tornadoes.

== Disadvantages ==
Since concrete is a porous material, concrete domes often have issues with sealing. If not treated, rainwater can seep through the roof and leak into the interior of the building. On the other hand, the seamless construction of concrete domes prevents air from escaping, and can lead to a buildup of condensation on the inside of the shell. Shingling or sealants are common solutions to the problem of exterior moisture, and dehumidifiers or ventilation can address condensation.

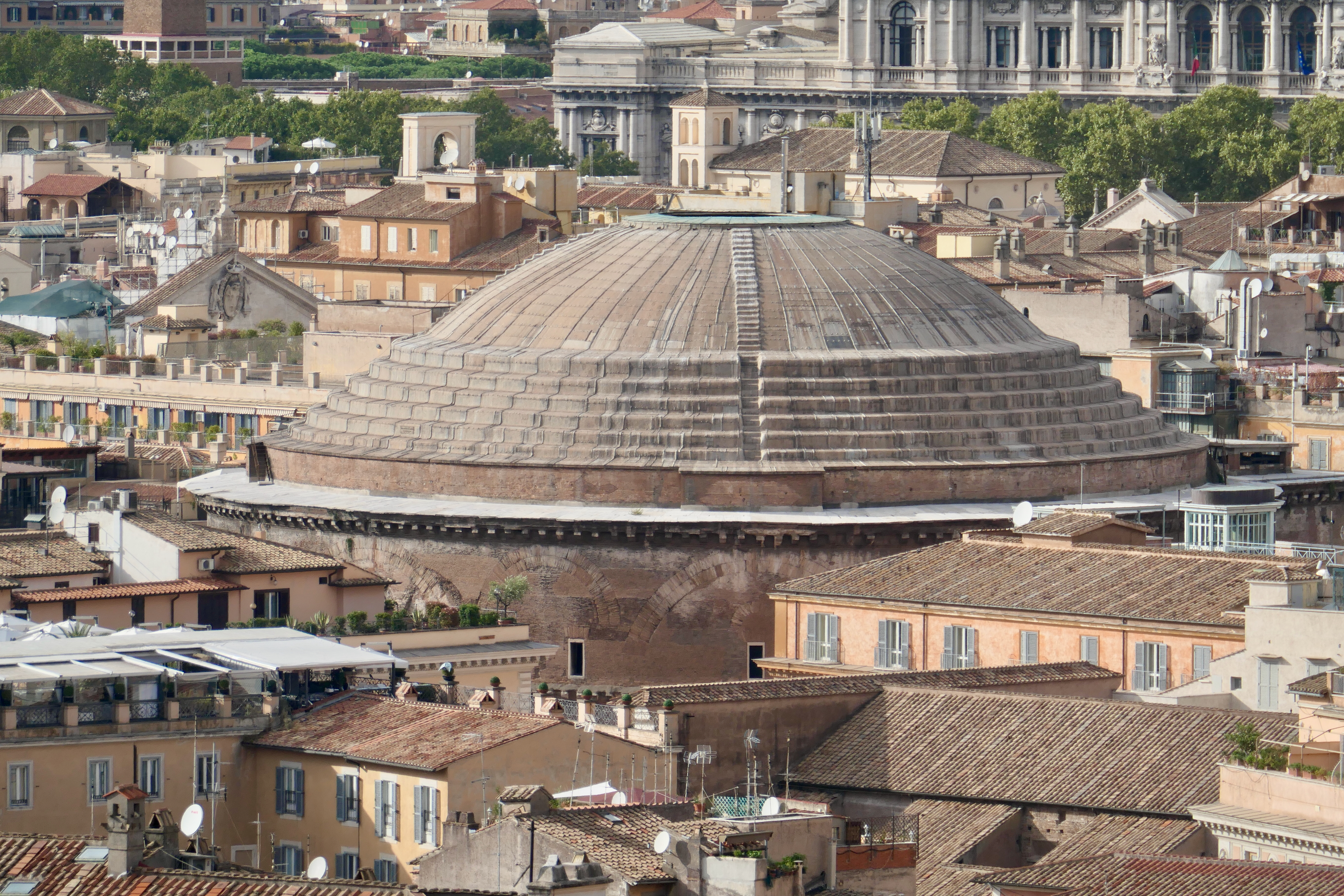
The dome of the Pantheon, Rome, the oldest known concrete shell

== Historic concrete shells ==
The oldest known concrete shell, the Pantheon in Rome, was completed about AD 125, and is still standing. It has a massive concrete dome 43m in diameter, with an oculus at its centre. A monolithic structure, it appears to have been sculpted in place by applying thin layers on top of each other in decreasing diameter. Massively thick at the bottom and thinning (with aerated volcanic pumice as part of the concrete mix) at the top, the Pantheon is a remarkable feat of engineering.

== Modern concrete shell construction ==
Modern thin concrete shells, which began to appear in the 1920s, are made from thin steel reinforced concrete, and in many cases lack any ribs or additional reinforcing structures, relying wholly on the shell structure itself.

Shells may be cast in place, or pre-cast off site and moved into place and assembled. The strongest form of shell is the monolithic shell, which is cast as a single unit. The most common monolithic form is the dome, but ellipsoids and cylinders (resembling concrete Quonset huts / Nissen huts) are also possible using similar construction methods.

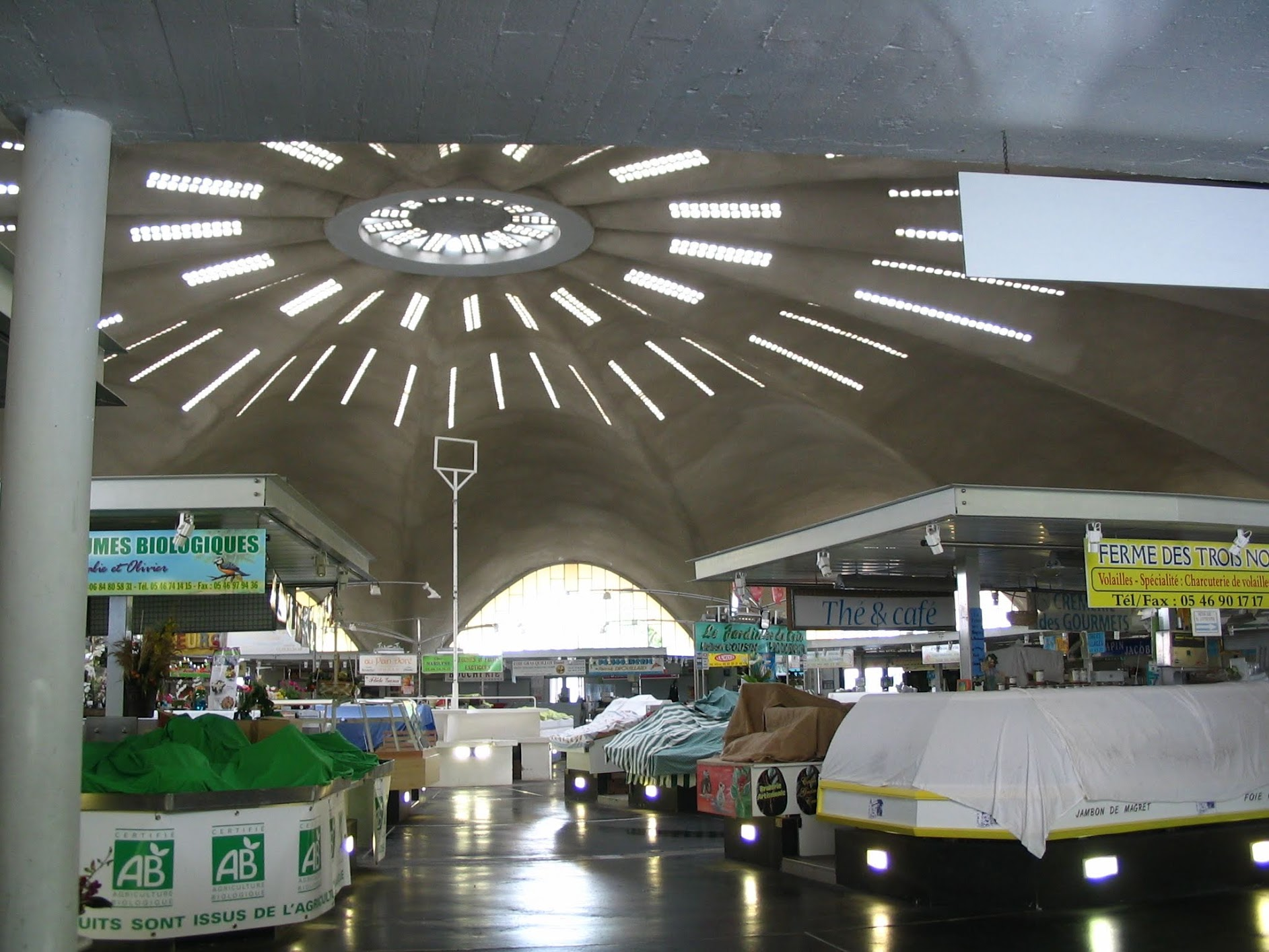
Royan Central Market.

Thin concrete shell buildings became popular in Post Second World War France because of the cost effectiveness of using minimal quantities of concrete. Examples at Royan include the Église Notre-Dame de Royan and the Marché central de Royan, whose roof reduces to just 80mm in thickness.

Geodesic domes may be constructed from concrete sections, or may be constructed of a lightweight foam with a layer of concrete applied over the top. The advantage of this method is that each section of the dome is small and easily handled. The layer of concrete applied to the outside bonds the dome into a semi-monolithic structure.

Monolithic domes are cast in one piece out of reinforced concrete and date back to the 1960s. Advocates of these domes consider them to be cost-effective and durable structures, especially suitable for areas prone to natural disasters. They also point out the ease of maintenance of these buildings. Monolithic domes can be built as homes, office buildings, or for other purposes.

Completed in 1963, the University of Illinois Assembly Hall, located in Champaign, Illinois was and is the first ever concrete-domed arena (see also the Gridshell-like Centennial Hall in Wrocław, Poland from 1913). The design of the new building, by Max Abramovitz, called for the construction of one of the world’s largest edge-supported structures. See Construction of Assembly Hall.

The Seattle Kingdome was the world's first (and only) concrete-domed multi-purpose stadium. It was completed in 1976 and demolished in 2000. The Kingdome was constructed of triangular segments of reinforced concrete that were cast in place. Thick ribs provided additional support.

== See also ==
Persons related

- Félix Candela
- Pier Luigi Nervi
- Eduardo Torroja
- Heinz Isler
- Ulrich Müther
- Dyckerhoff & Widmann
- Ildefonso Sánchez del Río
