= Heinz Meier =

Heinz Meier could refer to:

- Heinz Meier (actor) (1930-2013), German actor and theatre director
- Heinz Meier (bobsledder), Swiss bobsledder
- Heinz Meier (composer) (1925-1998), German composer who used the pseudonym "Henry Mayer"
- Heinz Meier (water polo) (1912–?), Swiss Olympic water polo player

== See also ==
- Henry Mayer (disambiguation)
