= Henry Mayer =

Henry Mayer could refer to:

- Henry Mayer (cartoonist) (1868–1954), German cartoonist
- Henry Mayer (historian) (1941–2000), American historian
- Henri Mayer (1878–1953/1955), German cyclist
- Heinz Meier (composer) (1925–1998), German composer who used the pseudonym "Henry Mayer"

== See also ==
- Henry Maier (1918–1994), American politician and mayor of Milwaukee, Wisconsin
- Heinz Meier (disambiguation)
- Henry Meyer (disambiguation)
