= Champaign Unit 4 School District =

School district in Illinois, United States

Champaign Community Unit School District No. 4
- 502 West Windsor Road Champaign, Champaign County, Illinois, 61820

District information
- Type: Unit school district
- Grades: PreK-12
- Established: 1948 (unit district)
- Superintendent: Dan Casillas
- Schools: 20
- NCES District ID: 1709420

Students and staff
- Students: 10179
- Faculty: 738.95 (FTE)
- Student–teacher ratio: 13.77

Other information
- Website: www.champaignschools.org

Champaign Community Unit School District No. 4 is a unit school district with over 10,000 students and 19 campuses covering Champaign and the villages of Bondville and Savoy in Champaign County, Illinois, United States. It was formed in 1948 from thirteen school districts.

== Facilities ==
In the 2010s, Unit 4 had about 1,500,000 square feet (140,000 m^{2}) of facility space, including a pre-kindergarten, 12 elementary schools, 4 middle schools, 2 general high schools, and an alternative high school.

As of 2025, schools were:

=== Specialty schools ===
- Champaign Early Childhood Center (CECC) — a pre-kindergarten program for ages 3–5 and is mainly for those with low-income, environmental factors, concerns for development or lack of kindergarten readiness skills
- Novak Academy — an alternative high school; later named after board of education member Greg Novak who advanced the creation of the school
- ACTIONS Program — an in-school suspension program

=== Elementary schools ===
- Vernon L. Barkstall Elementary School — named after Vernon L. Barkstall of the Champaign County Urban League
- Bottenfield Elementary School — named after Ezra Bottenfield, history teacher 1929–1946
- Carrie Busey Elementary School — in Savoy, Illinois; named after superintendent's office secretary 1911—1951
- Garden Hills Academy — named after its location in Garden Hills Subdivision
- Dr. Howard Elementary School — named after Hartwell D. Howard, settler in "West Urbana" in 1854, and one of the first two physicians in Champaign County
- International Prep Academy
- Kenwood Elementary School — named after its location in Kenwood Subdivision
- Robeson Elementary School — named after F.K. Robeson, Sr., whose family donated the school land
- South Side Elementary School — most likely named after its location, which was the far south side of Champaign at the time (1924)
- Stratton Academy of the Arts — named after Kenneth O. Stratton, first black school board member in Champaign
- Booker T. Washington STEM Academy — named after Booker T. Washington, former slave who became famous nationwide as an educator and education activist
- Westview Elementary School — named for its location on the west side of Champaign

=== Middle schools ===
- Edison Middle School — named after inventor Thomas Edison
- Franklin Middle School — named after Benjamin Franklin
- Jefferson Middle School — named after Thomas Jefferson; was "Parkside Junior High" during planning phases
- International Prep Academy (grades 6-8 since 2022-2023 SY)
- Garden Hills Academy (grades 6-8 since 2023-24 SY)

=== High schools ===
- Champaign Centennial High School — formerly the Champaign High School Annex, named after its location near Centennial Park
- Champaign Central High School — originally named just Champaign High School or Champaign Senior High School; renamed Champaign Central to distinguish it when Champaign Centennial was established

== History ==
=== Champaign School District 71 ===
Like much of the state of Illinois, Champaign school districts were formed by the statewide school law of 1855. Champaign had two school districts: District 1 west of First Street and District 2 east of First Street. District 1 was first to build a school — the "Little Brick" — on the corner of Randolph Street and Hill Street, and West High School in 1868 at Lynn, University and Park streets. District 2 built a school in 1860, but it and its successor were both destroyed by fires within a year. That school was finally rebuilt in 1872 and called East High School; it later was named Marquette. Districts 1 and 2 were combined into Union School District 6 in 1890 and students consolidated at West High School.

In 1892, Little Brick School was intentionally burned down to demolish it for a high school named Central School, and West High School was also destroyed by fire, being replaced with an elementary school named The Avenue School. Following that were Lincoln Elementary School in 1894, Willard School in 1898, and Gregory School in 1898.

The district was renumbered to No. 71 in 1901.

Schools built afterwards were Columbia (1905), Colonel Wolfe (1905), Lawhead (1907), Dr. Howard (1910), Senior High School (1914, later Edison). The old Central School switched from high school to grade school. Southside (1924), Lottie Switzer (1935) followed. A Junior High School was built on the site of the Avenue School; by this 21st century was Central High School. However, at the time, the school at Randolph and Hill was still called Central School, and when the junior high school was built, part of Central School was leased to businesses.

=== Community Unit School District 4 ===
Community Unit School District No. 4 was formed in 1948 from the territory of Champaign School District 71 and twelve one-room school districts.

With the 1950s baby boom came a run of school construction: Westview (1951), Booker T. Washington (1951), Franklin Junior High (1954), Bottenfield Elementary School (1955), Carrie Busey (1957), Garden Hills (1958), and Jefferson Junior High (1961), Kenwood (1963), and Robeson (1967). The old Senior High School became Edison Junior High School in 1956; the old Junior High School was expanded and converted to the new Champaign Central High School; and a new high school was built between 1963 and 1965, at first being used during construction in 1964 as the Senior High School Annex of Central High School, and after the end of construction in 1968 as the new Champaign Centennial High School.

Columbia, Franklin, and other schools were closed, re-opened, or re-purposed from the 1970s to the 1990s. Older schools closed after the baby boom included Hensley, Bondville, Colonel Wolfe, Gregory, and Lincoln, followed after by Savoy (1977) and Switzer (1978). South Side was closed in 1982 but re-opened in 1989.

Booker T. Washington School was rebuilt as a STEM school with a larger building, re-opening in August 2011.
