= Champaign Central High School =

Coordinates: 40°6′58.86″N 88°15′7.16″W

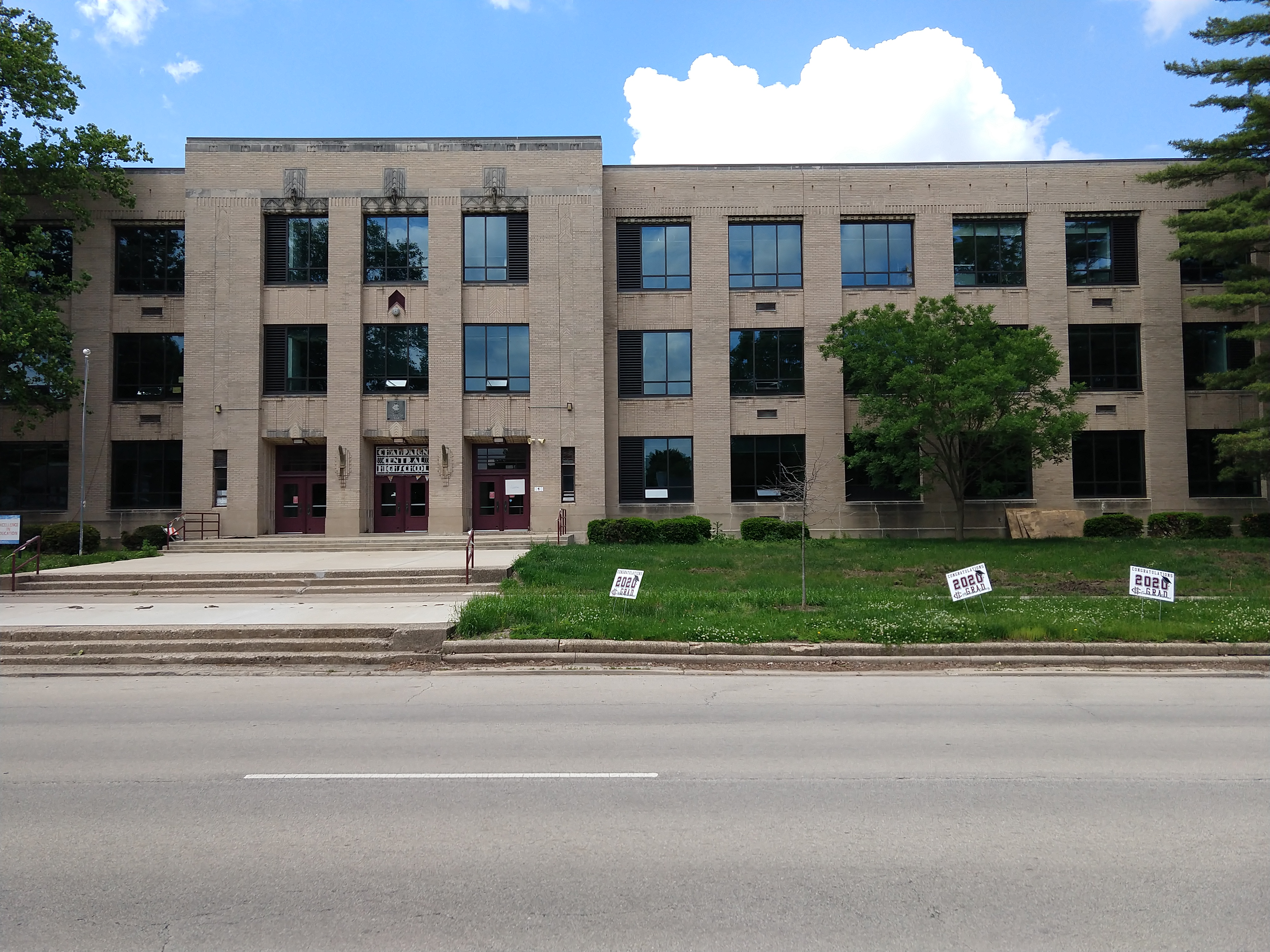

Location
- 610 West University Avenue; Champaign, Champaign County, Illinois 61820; United States

Information
- Former names: West Side High School Champaign High School Champaign Senior High School
- School type: Public
- Established: 1870
- School district: Champaign Community Unit 4 School District
- NCES District ID: 1709420
- Superintendent: Geovanny Ponce
- NCES School ID: 170942000546
- Principal: Dr. Angela Ward
- Teaching staff: 126.20 (on an FTE basis)
- Grades: 9-12
- Gender: Co-Ed
- Enrollment: 1,666 (2024-2025)
  - Grade 9: 509
  - Grade 10: 438
  - Grade 11: 374
  - Grade 12: 345
- Student to teacher ratio: 13.20
- Hours in school day: 8:05 am - 3:20 pm
- Colors: Maroon; White
- Fight song: Champaign Central Fidelity
- Athletics conference: Big 12
- Sports: Baseball (Boys) Basketball; Cross Country; Football; Golf; Soccer; Softball (Girls); Swimming; Tennis; Track & Field; Volleyball (Girls) Wrestling
- Mascot: Max Maroon (Bear); The Color of Maroon
- Nickname: Maroons
- Rival: Champaign Centennial High School; Urbana High School
- Newspaper: Champaign Chronicle
- Yearbook: The Maroon
- Website: Central Website

Champaign Central High School is a high school located in Champaign, Illinois. As of the 2024-25 school year, it has 1,666 students in grades 9-12. Dr. Angela Ward, longtime Champaign Unit 4 School District teacher and administrator, was named Interim Principal for Central High School in July 2026. It is part of the Champaign Unit 4 School District. Its sports teams are the Champaign Maroons.

== History ==
Champaign High School, now Champaign Central High School, began serving the public in 1870. The present school site, 610 W. University Avenue, was donated by J.P. White to the public schools of Champaign in 1868 and has housed Central High School since 1956. During the 1963–64 school year, approximately 300 students were assigned on a half-day basis to Jefferson Middle School due to over-crowding. These students attended three academic classes at Jefferson plus three classes at the senior high school. During the 1965–66 school year, approximately 550 sophomores attended classes in the first phase of the Senior High School Annex. They attended classes on the same schedule as those at Champaign High School. The 1966–67 school year found an equal distribution of sophomore and junior students at both Champaign Senior High School and the Annex. As a result, in 1968–69, the Champaign Board of Education officially established two district high schools, Central and Centennial. On April 1, 1997, the taxpayers of Champaign approved a bond issue that included an addition and extensive remodeling to Central High School. The main features of the new addition and remodeling were a large modern media center, a child development/day care center, foods laboratory, an expanded student services area, and three large state of the art a biological science laboratories. An open house and dedication of the new facilities was held on September 13, 1998. Central's mascot is a maroon bear, Max Maroon, and the school colors are maroon and white.

Champaign Central High School, circa 1996

In 2011, the Champaign school board began looking into replacing Champaign Central High School, citing concerns over the school's current facilities. Central had shared Centennial High School's football, softball, and soccer fields since the 1960s. By 2014 the district had purchased farmland in northern Champaign with the intent of building a new campus. However, local opposition led to the district approving a renovation plan in 2016 that kept both Central and Centennial in their current locations, while building additions to the two high schools. Central's renovations were completed in early 2023 at a cost of over $102 million and involved the demolition of multiple historic buildings in the surrounding neighborhood, including the former YMCA and Burnham mansion. As a result, Central now has its own sports facilities spread out within a mile of the school, but McKinley Field, Central's home football field, has not been allowed to host Central's football games due to neighborhood concerns and the field itself only having a capacity of 500 spectators.

== Notable alumni ==
- Alison Krauss, musical artist (attended, did not graduate)
- Bill Geist, TV journalist, CBS Sunday Morning
- Bob Richards, two-time Olympic gold medalist in pole vault
- J Leman, football player
- Somi (Laura Kakoma), singer
- Yvonne Suhor, actress
- Tyler McGill, Olympic gold medalist swimmer
- Rod Fletcher, All-American college basketball player
- Todd Peat, football player
- Jordan Caroline, Basketball Player
- George L. Wade, racecar manufacturer and minstrel show performer
