= Bondville, Illinois =

Bondville
- Village
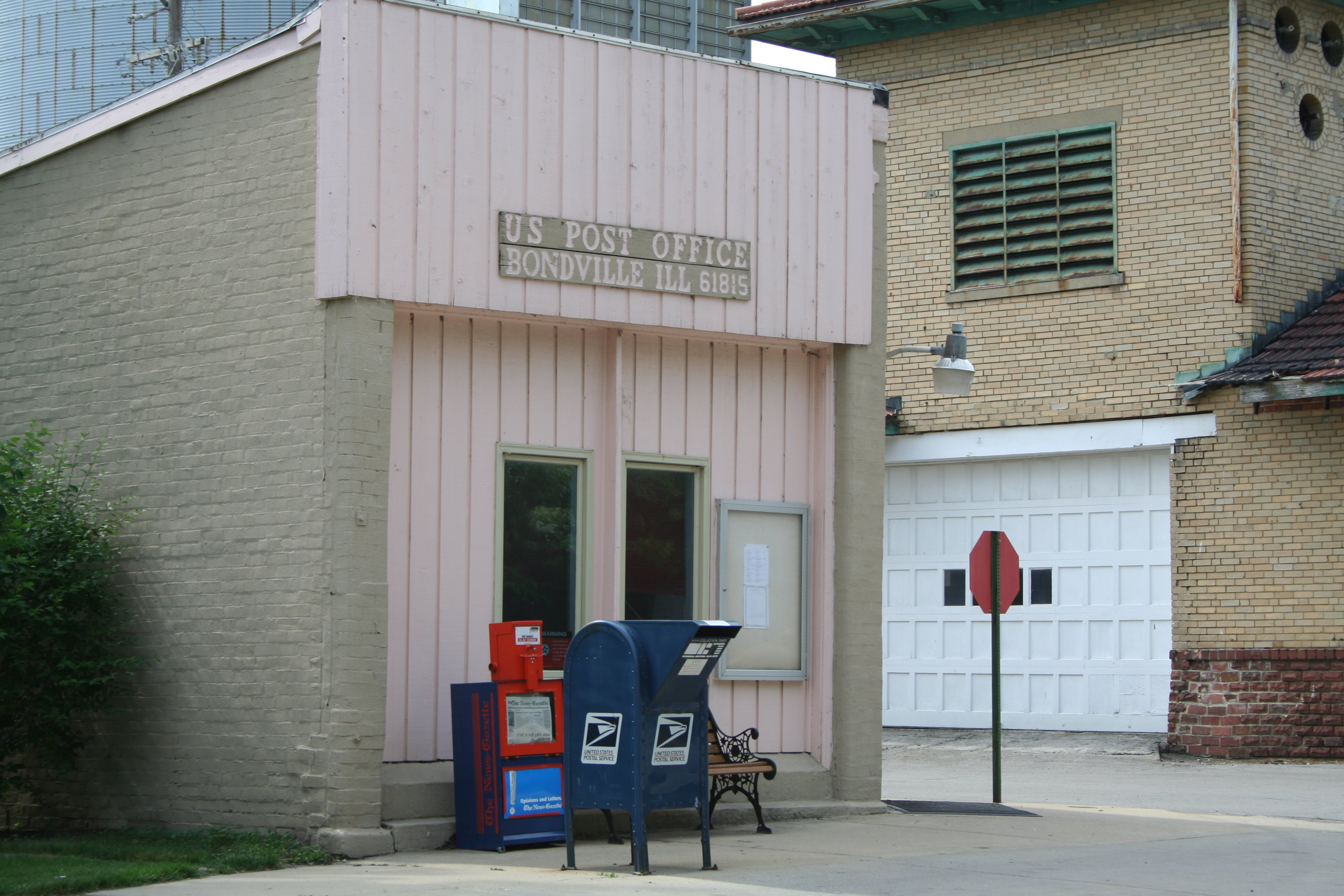
- Bondville Post Office, 2007

- Location of Bondville in Champaign County, Illinois.
- Coordinates: 40°06′43″N 88°22′15″W
- Country: United States
- State: Illinois
- County: Champaign

Government
  - Village president: Karl Kennicker

Area
  - Total: 0.25 sq mi (0.65 km^{2})
  - Land: 0.25 sq mi (0.65 km^{2})
  - Water: 0 sq mi (0.00 km^{2})
- Elevation: 715 ft (218 m)

Population (2020)
  - Total: 388
  - Density: 1,543.9/sq mi (596.11/km^{2})
- Time zone: UTC-6 (CST)
  - Summer (DST): UTC-5 (CDT)
- Postal code: 61815
- Area code: 217
- FIPS code: 17-07211
- GNIS feature ID: 2398149

Bondville is a village in Champaign County, Illinois, United States. The population was 388 at the 2020 census.

== Geography ==
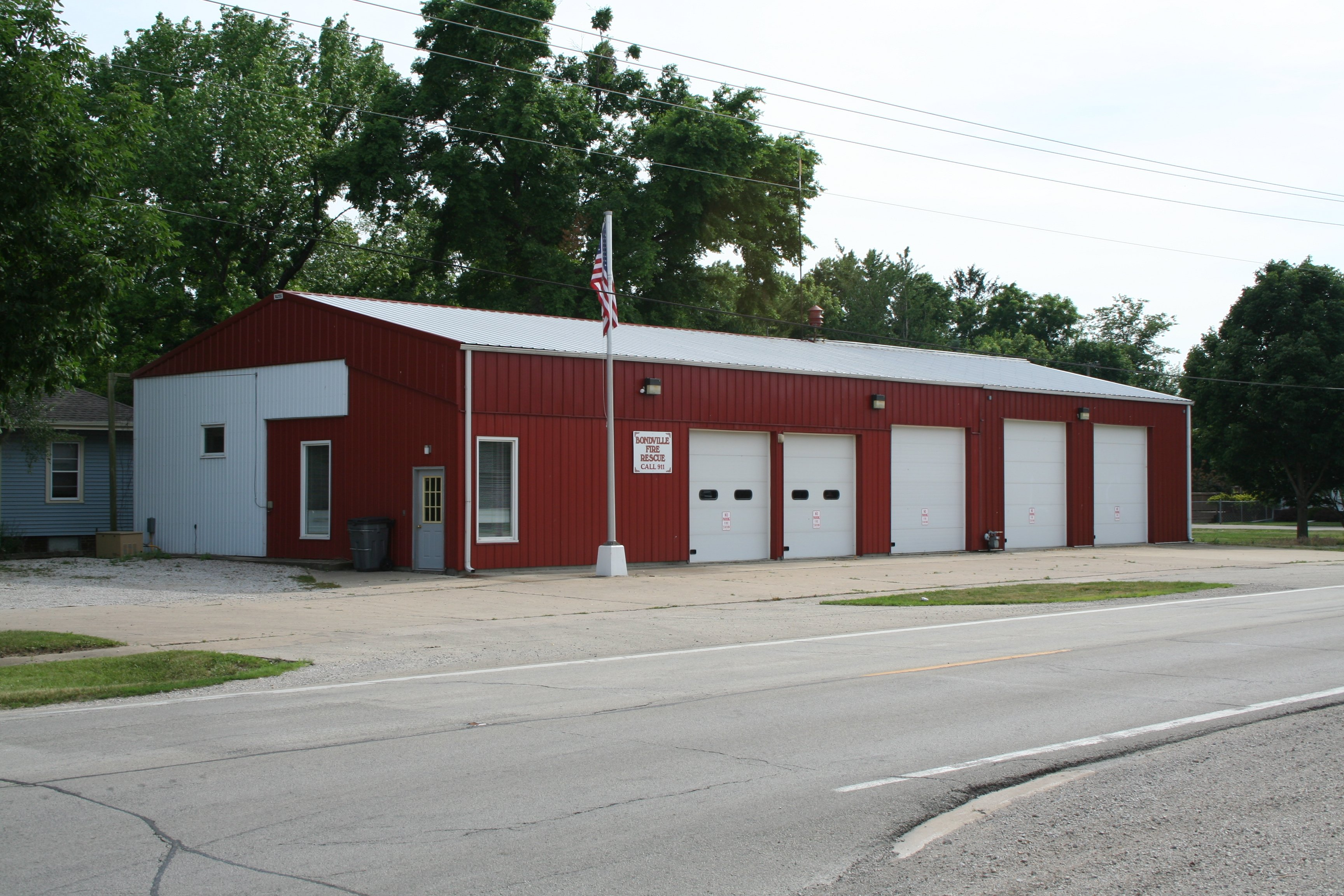
Bondville, Illinois Fire Station, 2007

Bondville is located about 2 miles (3.2 km) west of the western edge of Champaign, at the intersection of the east–west Illinois Route 10 and the north-south County Road 19. Interstate 72 passes from east to west about 0.5 miles (0.80 km) to the north of this intersection. The town of Seymour lies about 3 miles (4.8 km) further to the west. According to the 2021 census gazetteer files, Bondville has a total area of 0.25 square miles (0.65 km^{2}), all land.

== Demographics ==
Historical population
Census	Pop.	Note	%±
1980	442		—
1990	446		0.9%
2000	455		2.0%
2010	443		−2.6%
2020	388		−12.4%
U.S. Decennial Census

As of the 2020 census there were 388 people, 220 households, and 110 families residing in the village. The population density was 1,545.82 inhabitants per square mile (596.84/km^{2}). There were 201 housing units at an average density of 800.80 per square mile (309.19/km^{2}). The racial makeup of the village was 84.79% White, 2.84% African American, 0.26% Native American, 0.52% Asian, 0.52% from other races, and 11.08% from two or more races. Hispanic or Latino of any race were 3.35% of the population.

There were 220 households, out of which 13.2% had children under the age of 18 living with them, 42.27% were married couples living together, none had a female householder with no husband present, and 50.00% were non-families. 29.09% of all households were made up of individuals, and 7.27% had someone living alone who was 65 years of age or older. The average household size was 2.60 and the average family size was 2.07.

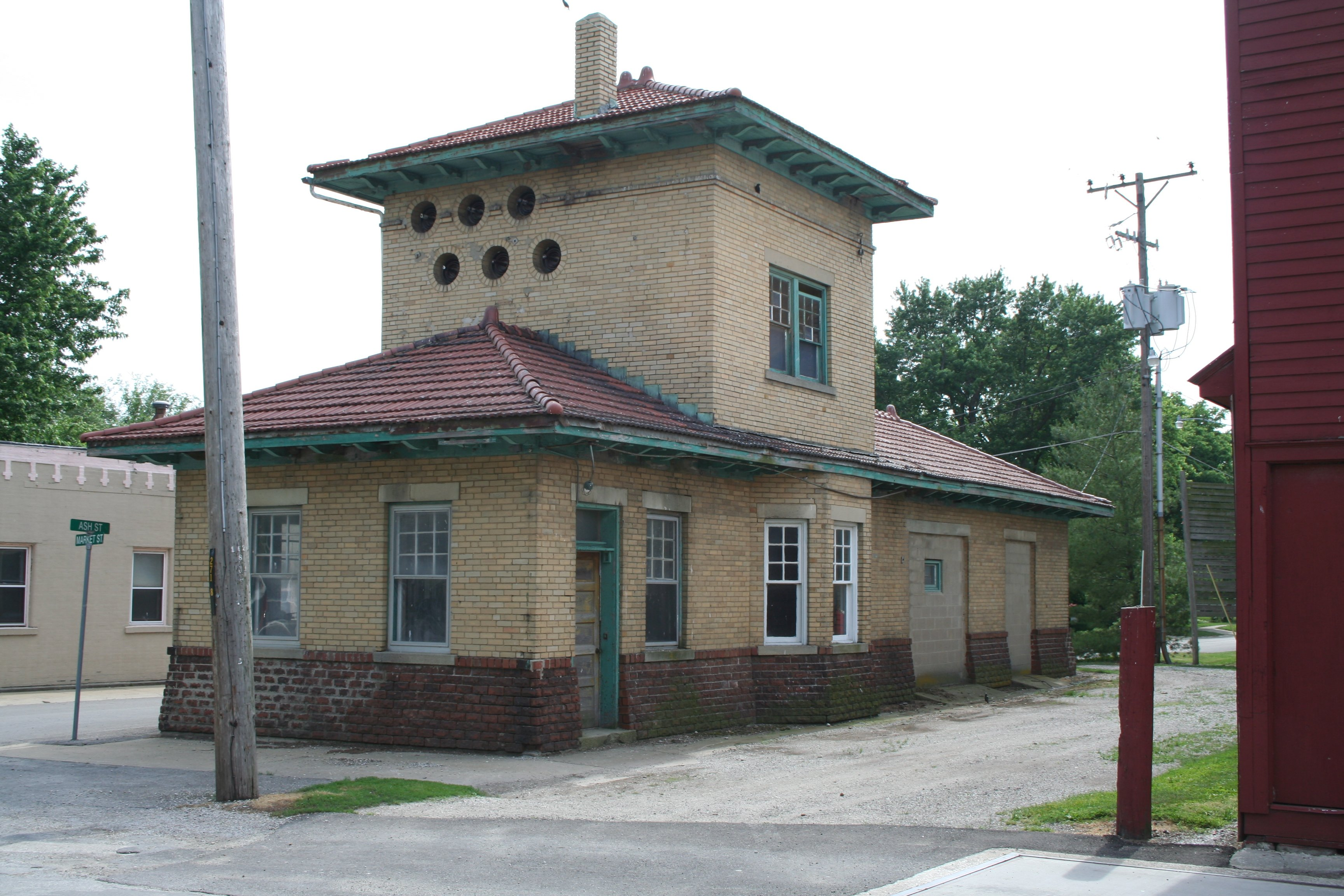
Old interurban rail station and power plant, 2007

The village's age distribution consisted of 10.8% under the age of 18, 10.1% from 18 to 24, 19.8% from 25 to 44, 37.3% from 45 to 64, and 22.0% who were 65 years of age or older. The median age was 50.3 years. For every 100 females, there were 124.1 males. For every 100 females age 18 and over, there were 113.7 males.

The median income for a household in the village was $53,750, and the median income for a family was $65,000. Males had a median income of $40,298 versus $29,500 for females. The per capita income for the village was $31,857. About 7.3% of families and 10.2% of the population were below the poverty line, including 0.0% of those under age 18 and 9.0% of those age 65 or over.

== Education ==
It is in the Champaign Community Unit School District 4.

== See also ==
- List of municipalities in Illinois
