= James Kinney (basketball) =

American basketball player

MBK Handlová
- Position: Point guard
- League: Slovak Basketball League

Personal information
- Born: October 11, 1990 (age 36) Champaign, Illinois
- Listed height: 6 ft 2 in (1.88 m)
- Listed weight: 180 lb (82 kg)

Career information
- High school: Champaign Centennial (Champaign, Illinois)
- College: Ohio (2009–2010); Utah State Eastern (2010–2011); San Jose State (2011–2013)
- NBA draft: 2013: undrafted
- Playing career: 2013–present

Career history
- 2013–2014: Özel Gelişim Koleji
- 2014–2015: KTE-Duna Aszfalt
- 2015–2016: Zalakerámia ZTE
- 2016: Szolnoki Olaj
- 2017: Inter Bratislava
- 2018–2019: BC Balkan
- 2019–2020: Soproni KC
- 2020–2021: Jászberényi KSE
- 2021–present: MBK Handlová

Career highlights
- WAC All-Newcomer team (2012); Second-team All-Scenic West (2011)

James Edwin Kinney Jr. (born October 11, 1990) is an American professional basketball player for MBK Handlová of the Slovak Basketball League.

== Early life ==
Kinney was born in Champaign, Illinois and graduated from Champaign Centennial High School in 2009. In his senior season, Kinney was The News-Gazette All-Area Player of the Year.

College recruiting
Name	Hometown	School	Height	Weight	Commit date
James Kinney; PG	Champaign, IL	Champaign Centennial HS	6 ft 1 in (1.85 m)	150 lb (68 kg)	Nov 5, 2008
James Kinney; PG	Recruit ratings: Scout: (85)				
Overall recruit ranking: Scout: 7 (IL); 83 (national) ESPN: 95 (national)
Note: In many cases, Scout, Rivals, 247Sports, On3, and ESPN may conflict in their listings of height and weight.; In these cases, the average was taken. ESPN grades are on a 100-point scale.; Sources: "2009 Ohio basketball commitment list". Rivals.; "2009 Ohio basketball recruiting". Scout.; "Ohio Bobcats 2009 player commits". ESPN.; "Scout.com Team Recruiting Rankings". Scout.; "2009 Team Ranking". Rivals.

== College career ==
As a freshman in 2009–10, Kinney played at Ohio University under coach John Groce. In 19 games with 3 starts, Kinney averaged 9.7 points and 1.5 rebounds.

On February 10, 2010, Kinney, already suspended indefinitely by Groce, pleaded guilty in Athens County court to a count of possession of marijuana. He was given a suspended jail sentence of 30 days, and his driver's license was suspended for 180 days. Groce subsequently dismissed Kinney from the team, and Kinney transferred to the College of Eastern Utah, a junior college. After Kinney's suspension began on February 4, Ohio won the 2010 Mid-American Conference men's basketball tournament and as #14 seed in the NCAA Tournament upset #3 seed Georgetown before losing to #6 seed Tennessee in the second round.

At Eastern Utah in 2010–11, Kinney averaged 13.0 points, 3.2 rebounds, and 3.5 assists in a 22–8 season and was named second-team All-Scenic West Athletic Conference.

Kinney transferred to San Jose State University to play under coach George Nessman. In his junior season, 2011–12, with the San Jose State Spartans, Kinney started all 31 games and led the team in scoring with 15.8 points per game. He also had 3.6 rebounds and 2.7 assists, as well as the most total steals on the season (40) and led the Western Athletic Conference in free throw shooting at 85.3%. San Jose State went 9–22 (1–13 WAC) that season.

As a senior in 2012–13, Kinney played 14 games with average 20.6 points, 5.5 rebounds, and 2.6 assists per game. Kinney was suspended twice in the season for violating team rules, the first time for the December 22, 2012 game against James Madison, the second time beginning January 11, 2013. On February 8, Nessman confirmed that Kinney's suspension would continue until the end of the season; the San Jose Mercury News reported that the suspension "is believed to be related to academics." After Kinney's second suspension, when the team was 9–6, San Jose State's scoring average went down 15 points to 49.8, and the team never won another game on the way to a 9–20 final record. Nessman was fired immediately after the season.

== Professional career ==
On August 6, 2013, Kinney signed with Özel Gelişim Koleji of the Turkish Basketball Second League. Kinney played 4 games for the team, with 2.5 points a game. He was sidelined by an ankle injury much of the season.

In September 2014, Kinney signed with KTE-Duna Aszfalt of the Hungarian Nemzeti Bajnokság I/A. In 29 games with KTE, Kinney has averaged 10.9 points, 3.2 rebounds, and 4.0 assists.

Kinney signed with ZTE KK of the same league for the 2015–16 season and averaged 16.9 points, 4.3 rebounds, and 4.5 assists.

In 2016, Kinney signed with Szolnoki Olaj KK also in Hungary.

On August 23, 2018, Kinney signed with BC Balkan of the Bulgarian league.

Kinney spent the 2020–21 season with Jászberényi KSE, averaging 9.3 points, 4.0 assists, 1.4 rebounds and 1.1 steals per game. On November 4, 2021, he signed with MBK Handlová of the Slovak Basketball League.
