= Centennial Park (Champaign, Illinois) =

Park in Champaign, Illinois, United States

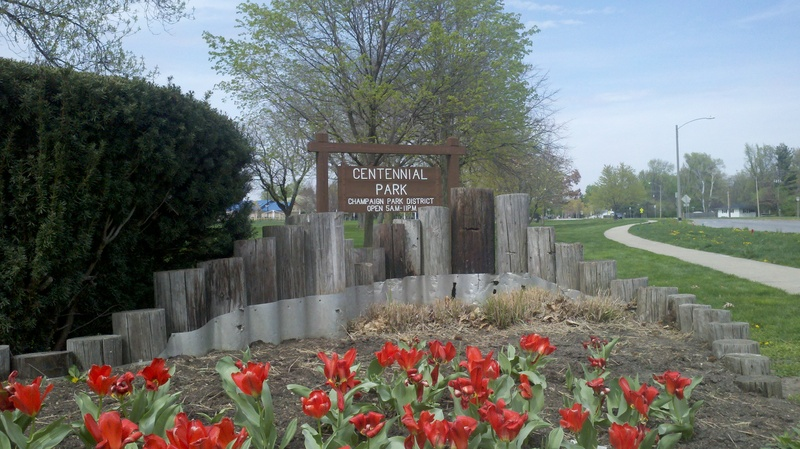
- Centennial Park Entrance Sign

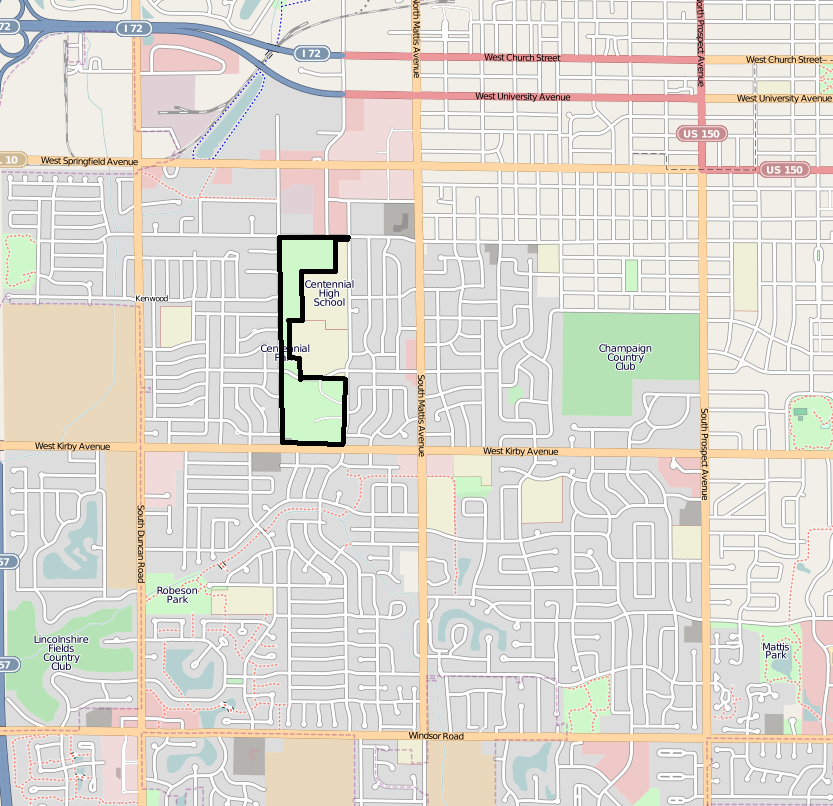
- Map of Centennial Park
- Location: Champaign, Illinois
- Coordinates: 40°06′02″N 88°17′02″W
- Area: 80 acres (32 ha)
- Elevation: 725 feet (221 m)
- Created: 1959
- Operator: Champaign Park District
- Status: Open all year
- Public transit: MTD

Located in the western part of Champaign, Illinois, Centennial Park is the second largest park operated by the Champaign Park District. Land for the park was acquired in 1959 for an estimated cost of $161,800. Since its acquisition of the land, the park district exchanged 5 acres (2.0 ha) of Centennial Park to Champaign Unit 4 School District in return for the land of Morrisey Park. Currently, Champaign Centennial High School and Jefferson Middle School sit within the park. The campus was designed by UIUC Professor Karl B. Lohmann.

== Facilities ==
The park features eight lighted tennis courts, one lighted baseball field, five additional unlit baseball fields, one soccer field, and one basketball court. Additionally, the park contains a playground and Centennial Hill, which is used as a sledding hill during the winter months.

== Leonhard Recreation Center ==
In 1976, the center was dedicated as the Bicentennial Center in honor of the United States' Bicentennial anniversary. However, the center was rededicated as its current namesake in 1984 to honor former park district commissioner Patricia H. Leonhard.

The Rec Center includes a full-size gymnasium, an air-conditioned activity space, locker rooms, and offices.

The park district announced in 2012 that the 35-year-old building will be replaced with a $5 million complex in the spring of 2014. Ground was broken on the project on July 3, 2013. The new complex will feature a geothermal heating and cooling system, a key feature that the current recreation center is lacking. Furthermore, the new rec center will feature the following:

- Indoor playground
- Walking track
- Basketball courts
- Volleyball courts
- Activity rooms

The new building will also host special interest classes, and sport and fitness programs. It will also continue to host the park district's summer programs for children.

== Bresnan Meeting Center ==
Originally dedicated as "The Meeting Center" when the facility opened on May 2, 1968, the Besnan Center houses the administrative offices for the Champaign Park District. The center was rededicated on May 9, 1984 after park commissioner Donald F. Bresnan for its current namesake. Additionally the Board of Directors' meetings are held at 7pm on the second Wednesday of every month.

== Sholem Aquatic Center ==
Sholem Aquatic Center
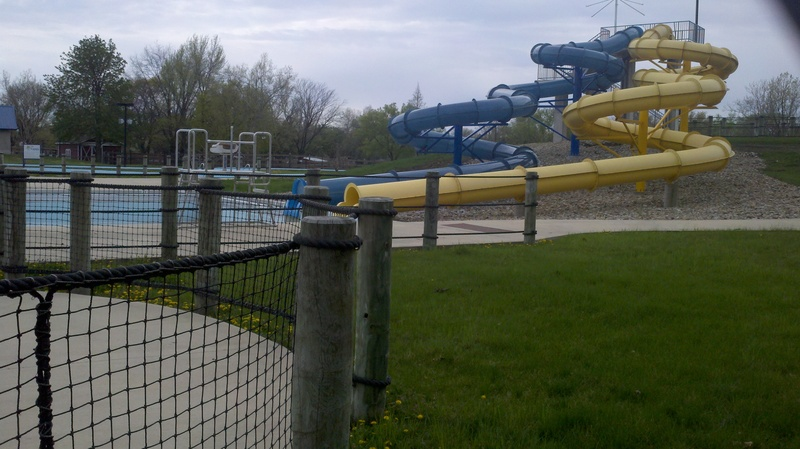
- Water slides at the park
- Interactive map of Sholem Aquatic Center
- Slogan: "Your Place to Play!"
- Location: 2005 Sangamon Drive; Champaign, IL 61821
- Owner: Champaign Park District
- Previous names: Sholem Pool
- Pools: 2 pools
- Water slides: 3 water slides
- Children's areas: 2 children's areas
- Website: homepage

Opening in 2006, the family water park serves the Champaign-Urbana metropolitan area each year from Memorial Day until Labor Day. Operating hours are typically reduced when Unit 4 schools are still in session. Staffed by award-winning Lifeguards, the Sholem Aquatic Center contains many different water features, pools a concession stand, and grassy areas for shade. Each feature is divided among the park in different areas:

- The Beach (8,000 sq-ft pool and waterplay area)
- The Puddle (a wading area for small children)
- The Sea (an eight-lane, 25 yard lap pool)
- The Falls (170 ft tube slide)
- The Plunge, and Blue Rush (both are 197 ft water slides enclosed in darkness)
- The Rapids (660 ft inner-tube river)
- The Oasis (concession stand with seating)

The aquatic center also offers swimming lessons, teen swim hours, and adult swim hours. Additionally, the complex is available for private rental after hours.

== Prairie Farm ==
Centennial Park also features Prairie Farm, which serves as a full-size, replica farm. Dedicated in 1966, the farm features barns, farmhouse, pond, pasture, and flower garden. The farm is open Memorial Day weekend through the middle of August and also hosts several children activities and programs throughout the season. Additionally, the farm houses traditional farm animals like sheep, pigs, goats, horses, cows, chickens, and geese. Admission is free, but donations are encouraged to help sustain the facility.
