= Meyer's =

Defunct department store chain based in Pasadena, California

Meyer's Department Store was a department store chain based in Pasadena, California. Over the years Meyer opened stores in Pasadena, Hemet, Holtville, and South Gate. Meyer established a Meyer Department Store in Long Beach at 151 Pine St. c. 1905, then re-opened it in 1909 as The Emporium, selling it in 1914.

Meyer's was founded in 1907 by G. H. and Henry D. Meyer, who until that time had been running a store in Long Beach. In 1919 the store acquired the spaces of the two stores to the north, Mertel's and Brenner & Wood, expanding its store into those spaces.

H. T. Sundbye, Meyer's brother-in-law, purchased the family's interest in the department store after Henry D. Meyer's passing in 1924, and took up the position of general manager of the store.
