= Louise Woodroofe =

American Fauvist painter

Louise Marie Woodroofe
- Born: January 28, 1892; Champaign, Illinois
- Died: February 15, 1996 (aged 104); Illinois
- Education: Champaign High School, University of Illinois, Syracuse University
- Alma mater: Syracuse University
- Known for: paintings of clowns and circus performers, teaching at University of Illinois
- Style: Impressionism; Fauvism; Abstract Modernism
- Movement: National Academy of Design 1955 award

Louise Marie Woodroofe (Champaign, Illinois, January 28, 1892 - Illinois, February 15, 1996) was an American Fauvist painter, best known for her paintings of circus performers.

== Life ==
Louise Woodroofe was the oldest child of Walter and Mary Woodroofe. Her mother died in childbirth in 1897, and her father moved to Chicago, leaving five-year-old Louise in Champaign to be raised by her maternal grandparents, Mr. and Mrs. John G. Miller.

Louise Woodroofe studied painting (and exhibited her works) initially at the University of Illinois (1913-1917), where she was a member of the Iota sorority and drew for the Illio yearbook, and continued the education at Syracuse University, graduating with a bachelor's degree in 1919. Initially leaning towards Impressionist techniques, she also learned from Hugh Breckenridge at the Breckenridge School of Art in East Gloucester, Massachusetts, who taught her Fauvist techniques and usage of color. In 1920 she was employed as an instructor of freehand drawing in the University of Illinois Architecture Department. She also traveled to Los Angeles, San Diego, San Francisco and Milwaukee before settling in the Chicago around 1927.

In 1925 she was featured on 32nd Annual Exhibition of American Art at the Cincinnati Art Museum, together with Childe Hassam, Robert Henri and Mary Cassatt. She also had a solo exhibition at the Findley Gallery in Chicago in 1928. In the same year she became an assistant professor of architecture at the University of Illinois, the first female engineering professor of the university.

Despite her shyness, Louise Woodroofe was a member of the North Shore Arts Association (1931-1937) National Association of Women Painters and the American Watercolor Society. In the 20s, 30s and 40s she traveled in the summers with the Ringling Brothers Circus, painting circus performers. She would be given free passes to the Ringling circus by John & Henry Ringling North until the 1960s.

Louise Woodroofe was moved from Architecture Department to the College of Fine and Applied Arts in 1941, becoming a full Professor of Art in 1948, which made her one of the first tenured female professors at the University of Illinois.

In the late 1940s, she had a solo exhibition of her circus paintings at the Crane Gallery of London, England. She won numerous awards for painting excellence from 1930 to 1965, such as 1955 award for a circus subject at the National Academy of Design.

Louise Woodroofe helped her student, Max Abramovitz, with design of the original Assembly Hall (now the State Farm Center), recommending circus-inspired features such as wide entry door at the base and ceiling installation for connecting a trapeze. She was voted the "Most Supportive University Faculty Member" at the University of Illinois in 1978.

Throughout her life, she exhibited at the North Shore Arts Association, Butler Institute of American Art, Pennsylvania Academy of the Fine Arts, National Arts Club, the National Academy of Design, and in galleries in Chicago and London, England. She never married, was known for her privacy and refusal to be interviewed, but also for “spectacular,” “wild and splashy” personality and love of color in her works and personal style. She died aged 104 in Illinois, well respected as an artist and teacher. After her death University of Illinois established Louise Woodroofe Prize, which is awarded annually to an architecture student based on their body of artistic work.
