= Construction of Assembly Hall (Champaign) =

Building process of an indoor arena

Coordinates: 40.096°N 88.236°W

The construction of State Farm Center, originally known as the Assembly Hall, at the University of Illinois at Urbana–Champaign consisted of building a huge indoor arena with a 400-foot-diameter (120 m) concrete dome whose center height is 125 feet (38 m) above the center floor, and which weighs 10 million pounds. The building is considered an engineering marvel because of the unique method used to build the concrete roof. State Farm Center, the first-ever concrete dome arena, hosts the campus's teams in men's and women's basketball, numerous concerts and other events. It holds sentimental value for numerous alumni and fans alike and attracts attention for its design and construction. The construction of the Assembly Hall was conceived to provide UIUC with needed space for ceremonies and athletic events. The university's population had outgrown the largest building on campus at that time, the Auditorium (later rededicated Foellinger Auditorium), and desired one building that could hold the entire university class. The design of the new building, by Max Abramovitz, called for the construction of one of the world's largest edge-supported structure. The assembly hall was completed in 1963, and was dedicated on Honors Day, Friday May 3.

The arena was renamed State Farm Center in 2013 after the Illinois-based insurance company purchased the naming rights to the facility for $60 million over 30 years. The sale of naming rights provided a significant portion of the funding for a planned renovation of the facility.

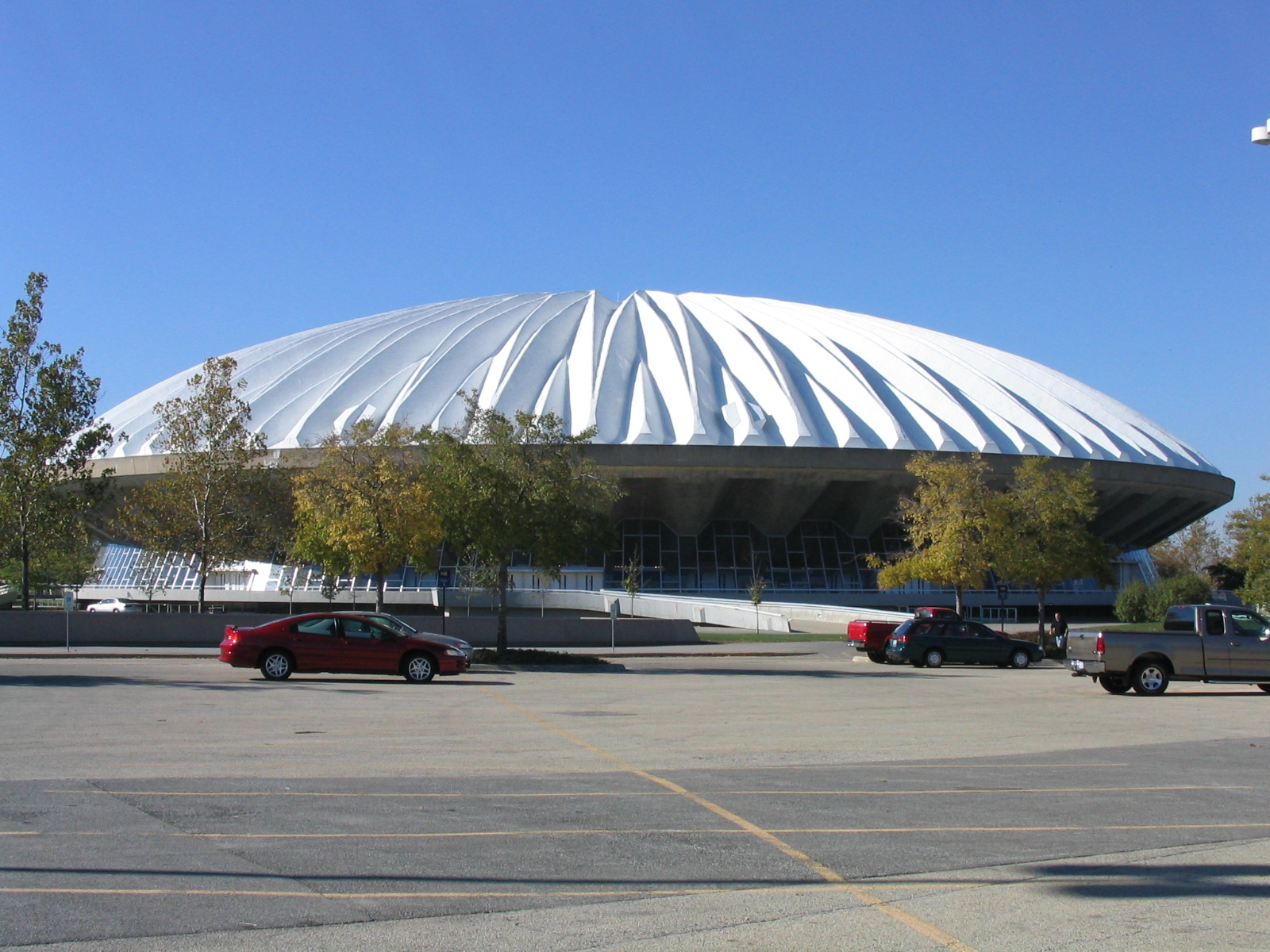
State Farm Center, formerly Assembly Hall

== Planning ==
Plans to build a new student center began before 1958. The student enrollment at the University of Illinois was growing tremendously through the years and the school's Building Committee wanted to plan for future growth. The student enrollment was 18,813 in 1958-58 and was predicted to reach 24,500 by 1965 and 34,000 by 1970. The university's Building Committee was quoted by The News-Gazette, saying, "The University of Illinois has not added a foot of space for organized student activities and recreation since the Illini Union Building was constructed in 1940-41. The enrollment at that time was slightly over 12,000 and the Union, fine though it is, is inadequate now and for expected enrollments in the future."

The main concern at the time was how to pay for the building's $8.7 million price tag. The university administration decided to fund the project through a student fee of $20 a semester and issue bonds.

The plans for Assembly Hall called for a very large structure with no interior supports. The project was overseen by Ray C. Dickerson, president of Felmley-Dickerson Co. who hired architects Harrison & Abramovitz and structural engineering firm Ammann & Whitney, of New York City. Max Abramovitz was helped by his University of Illinois teacher Louise Woodroofe, with design, who recommended circus-inspired features such as wide entry door at the base and ceiling installation for rigging a trapeze. Edward G. Maliskas (U of I Engineering, 1950) was Felmley-Dickerson's on-site construction superintendent. The building would hold 16,000 permanent seats with an additional 2,000 seats if necessary.

== Construction ==
The construction of Assembly Hall followed the process used for building any other building. The construction crews first built the foundation, then built the walls and supports for the roof, and, finally, built the roof. The Assembly Hall became known as an engineering marvel because of the unique method used to construct its roof. At its opening, and for the next few years, it was the largest dome structure in North America, a title that was retained until the Houston Astrodome opened in 1965.

=== Foundation, walls and supports ===
According to the article "To Cover This Assembly Bowl: A 400 ft (120 m) Prestressed Saucer" by Engineering News-Record, the total weight of Assembly Hall is carried by 48 massive buttresses to a 16 feet (4.9 m) wide and 3.5 feet (1.1 m) thick concrete ring foundation, with a 109 feet (33 m) radius. The construction crews first dug down 15 feet (4.6 m) from ground level and poured the concrete ring on high-density, hard gray clay. The center floor of the stadium is 24 feet (7.3 m) below ground level, however the contractors decided not to excavate all of the dirt before the roof was constructed. This decision gave the construction crews more surface area to work on, and decreased the height of scaffolding used when forming the concrete roof. After the roof was completed and the scaffolding was removed, the rest of the soil was excavated through the building's entrances. By building the structure into the ground, the top row is only 36 feet (11 m) above the ground line. The construction of Assembly Hall required excavation of 60,000 cu yd of soil. Most of the foundation: ring footing, 48 buttresses, and columns and walls of the circular concourse, was completed in 1960.

=== Construction of the dome roof ===
Construction of the roof started with pouring the concrete. After the concrete finished curing, construction crews post-tensioned the concrete roof to its final strength.

==== Process of pouring concrete ====
After the buttresses were completed, the construction crews could then begin building the falsework on which the concrete would harden. While the concrete was drying, the roof was supported by a central steel tower, the buttresses around the periphery, a circular timber tower about 135 feet (41 m) from the center, and two movable timber scaffolds at the midpoints of 120 feet (37 m) and 60-foot (18 m)-span joists. These supports totaled at 800,000 square feet (74,000 m^{2}) of wooden scaffolding. To aid in construction of the roof, a temporary steel tower was erected in the center of the stadium. As mentioned in the foundation section, the contractors decided not to fully excavate the interior of the building in order to reduce the required height of the steel tower and allow more surface area for construction crews. This decision decreased the tower height to only 100 feet (30 m) thus decreased cost.

According to the article "To Cover this Assembly Bowl: A 400-ft Prestressed Saucer, the roof was cast in 24 segments of 15° each. Each segment of the roof is 52 feet wide at the rim, and 6.5 feet wide at the center. The central ring beam, or very center of the dome, is a heavily reinforced 4 feet thick concrete slab that contains 170 cubic yards of lightweight concrete. The entire roof used 2,880 cubic yards of light weight concrete that weighed only 105 pounds per cubic feet."

Once the concrete had finished curing and dried, the top of the roof was painted with three applications of plastic material for water and weatherproofing.

==== Post-tensioning the concrete ====
The dome shape of the roof, by design, causes both vertical and horizontal reactions or forces on the buildings walls and monoliths. In order to make Max Abramovitz design a reality, a relatively new post-tensioning technique was required. The post-tensioning techniques required for the construction of the Assembly hall were first developed for Titan missile base construction. Felmley-Dickerson Co sub-contracted Preload Co. of New York City to post-tension a concrete ring girder around the perimeter of the dome. Preload Co. borrowed a special horizontal-wheeled tractor from the missile silo work to wind the steel wire around the dome. The wrapping machine required some slight modifications for this project.

In order to post-tension the concrete roof, the construction crews used the wrapping machine to wrap the edge of the roof in miles of steel wire and pull the wires extremely tight. The effect is similar to a rubber band. The rubber band (the steel wire) wants to constrict into a smaller circle, while the roof of Assembly Hall pushes radially outward. The two forces are designed to cancel each other out. In order to create the required stress, the wire was pulled through a steel die that reduced its diameter. The first 75% of steel wire was pulled through a 0.211-in.-dia die to create a 130,000-psi stress. The last 25% of steel wire was pulled through a 0.214-in.-dia die to create a 120,000-psi stress. The wrapping machine was propelled by a 200-hp motor, along an endless chain 1,260 feet (380 m) long around the circumference of the dome. Average speed of the machine was 8 mph.

As the wrapping machine traveled around the dome, 2,467 times, the wires were placed in 44 vertical rows and each row decreased from 77 wires on the innermost row to 37 wires for the outer row. Each row was separated by a 1 1/8 in. wide and 1/8 in. thick steel bar. These spacers were used in order allow each wire to be fully encase in grout, thus creating a permanent bond.

The construction crews torpedo-spliced spools of wire together to create 600 miles (970 km) of one continuous wire. Torpedo splicing consists of two half-sections screwed together at the center, with each section containing spring-loaded jaws that engaged the wire. The more tension put into the wires, the tighter they grip.

After all the post-tensioning was completed the 85 sq. in. of total cross-sectional area of wrapped steel was fully encased in 200 cu yd of grout, creating a permanent bond. The post-tensioning of the concrete worked so well that the 10 million pound roof was raised 2 in. off of the center tower by the wire structure when tensioning was finished. The post-tensioning of the roof was completed on March 16.
