= Mikel Leshoure =

American gridiron football player (born 1990)

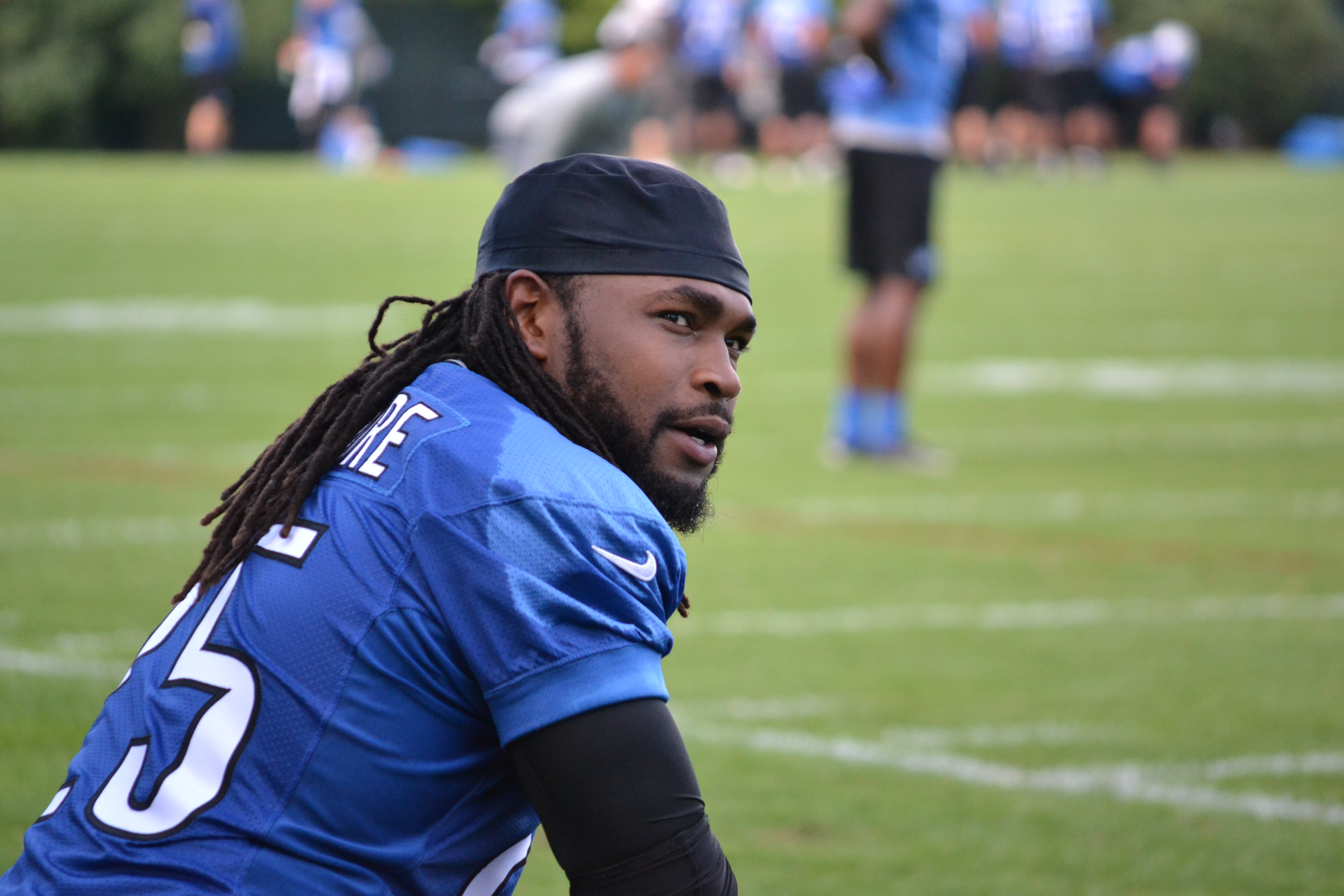
- Leshoure with the Detroit Lions in 2012

No. 25
- Position: Running back

Personal information
- Born: March 30, 1990 (age 36); Streator, Illinois, U.S.
- Listed height: 6 ft 0 in (1.83 m)
- Listed weight: 233 lb (106 kg)

Career information
- High school: Champaign Centennial
- College: Illinois (2008–2010)
- NFL draft: 2011: 2nd round, 57th overall pick

Career history
- Detroit Lions (2011–2013); BC Lions (2016)*
- * Offseason or practice squad member only

Awards and highlights
- Second-team All-American (2010); First-team All-Big Ten (2010)

Career NFL statistics
- Rushing attempts: 217
- Rushing yards: 807
- Rushing touchdowns: 9
- Receptions: 34
- Receiving yards: 214
- Stats at Pro Football Reference

Mikel Leshoure (born March 30, 1990) is an American former professional football player who was a running back in the National Football League (NFL). He was selected by the Detroit Lions in the second round of the 2011 NFL draft. He played college football for the Illinois Fighting Illini.

== Early life ==
Leshoure attended Champaign Centennial High School in Champaign, Illinois. During his career, he rushed for 4,652 yards on 681 carries and scored 52 rushing touchdowns.

== College career ==
As a freshman at the University of Illinois, Leshoure played sparingly collecting 126 yards on 35 carries. Leshoure first received a significant amount of playing time as a sophomore, playing in 12 games and running for 734 yards on only 108 carries. During the 2010 season, Leshoure rushed for 1,697 yards on 281 carries (126.1 yards per game, which was eighth best in the nation) with 17 touchdowns, playing in all 13 games. and capping off the season by scoring three touchdowns in the Illini's 38–14 victory over Baylor in the 2010 Texas Bowl. He also is the Illinois single game rushing record holder by rushing for 330 yards against Northwestern.

=== Statistics ===
Year	Team	Att	Yards	Average	TDs	Receptions	Yards	TDs
2008	Illinois	35	126	3.6	1	6	66	0
2009	Illinois	108	734	6.8	5	14	177	2
2010	Illinois	281	1,697	6.0	17	17	196	3
Totals		424	2,557	6.0	23	37	439	5

== Professional career ==
Pre-draft measurables
Height	Weight	Arm length	Hand span	Wingspan	40-yard dash	10-yard split	20-yard split	20-yard shuttle	Three-cone drill	Vertical jump	Broad jump	Bench press
5 ft 11 5/8 in (1.82 m)	227 lb (103 kg)	32 5/8 in (0.83 m)	9 1/2 in (0.24 m)	6 ft 3 1/2 in (1.92 m)	4.65 s	1.64 s	2.72 s	4.40 s	6.82 s	38.0 in (0.97 m)	10 ft 2 in (3.10 m)	21 reps
All values from NFL Combine

=== Detroit Lions ===
Leshoure was taken with the 57th overall pick in the second round of the 2011 NFL draft by the Detroit Lions. On August 8, 2011, Leshoure tore his Achilles tendon in practice after a collision with Cliff Avril, and missed his entire rookie season.

After being suspended for the first two games of the 2012 season and missing his entire rookie season, Leshoure made his NFL debut in Week 3 against the Tennessee Titans. Leshoure had 26 carries for 100 yards and a touchdown, but the Lions lost 44–41 in overtime.

On August 30, 2014, Leshoure was released by the Lions as a 53-man roster cut.

=== BC Lions ===
Leshoure signed with the BC Lions on February 5, 2016. He was released by the team on May 5.

== See also ==
- List of NCAA major college football yearly scoring leaders
