= Champaign Centennial High School =

Coordinates: 40.105863°N 88.282081°W

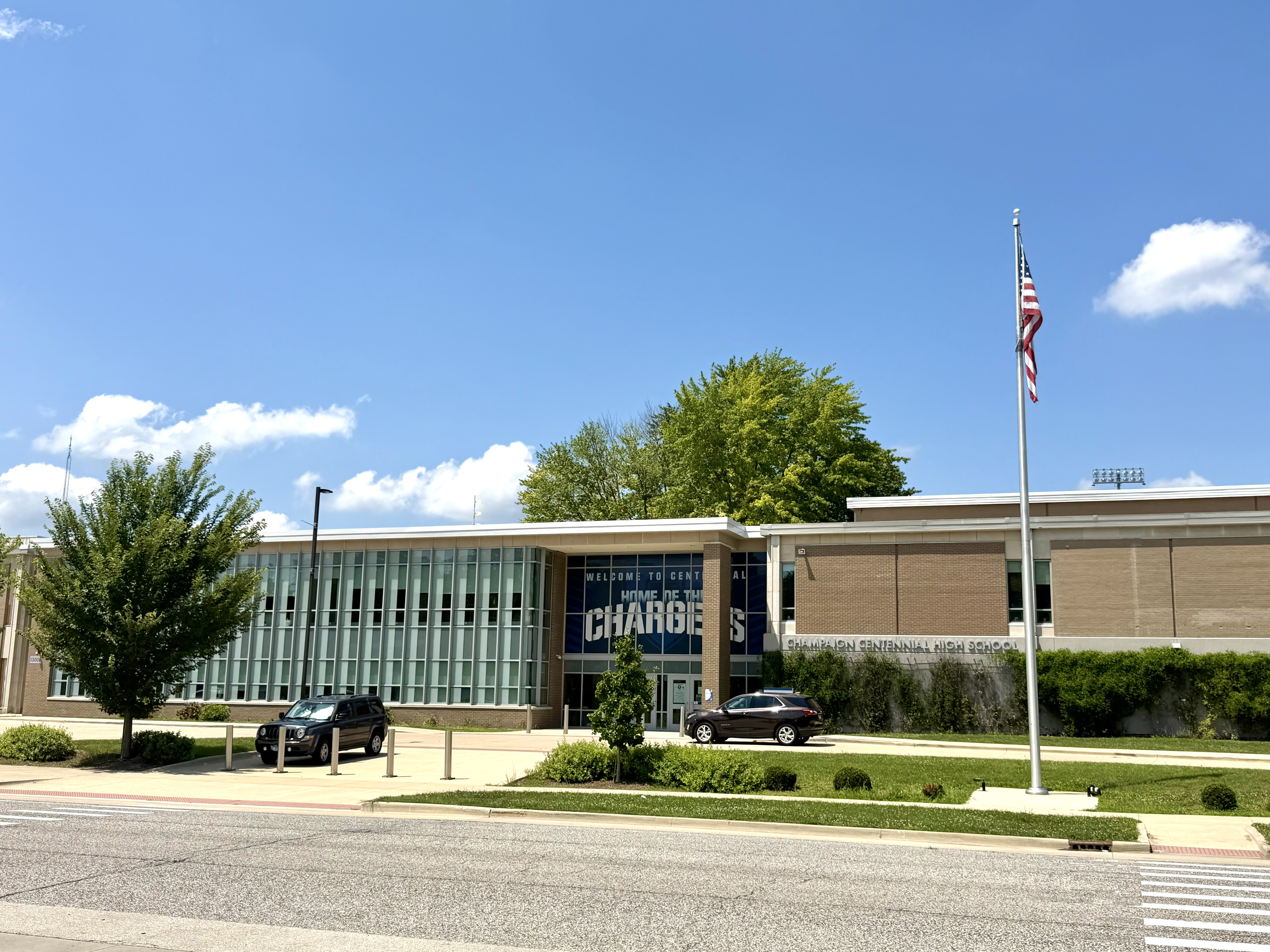

Location
- 913 South Crescent Drive; Champaign, Champaign County, Illinois 61821; United States

Information
- School type: Public high school
- Opened: 1966
- Status: Open
- School district: Champaign Unit 4 School District
- NCES District ID: 1709420
- Superintendent: Geovanny Ponce
- NCES School ID: 170942000545
- Principal: Sara Sanders
- Teaching staff: 109.40 (on an FTE basis)
- Grades: 9–12
- Enrollment: 1,476 (2024–25)
  - Grade 9: 456
  - Grade 10: 334
  - Grade 11: 352
  - Grade 12: 334
- Student to teacher ratio: 13.49
- Hours in school day: 8:05am – 3:20pm
- Colors: Columbia blue Navy blue White
- Athletics: Illinois High School Association
- Athletics conference: Big Twelve Conference (Illinois)
- Mascot: Charger (knight seated on a horse)
- Nickname: Chargers
- Rival: Champaign Central High School
- Newspaper: The Centinal
- Yearbook: The Centurian
- Website: School website

Champaign Centennial High School is a public high school serving grades 9–12 in Champaign, Illinois. It is part of Champaign Unit 4 School District. As of the 2024–25 school year, it had 1,476 students. The school is located next to Jefferson Middle School and Centennial Park.

== Curriculum ==
The school offers a variety of courses, including AP courses in Macroeconomics, English, Calculus AB or BC, Physics C: Mechanics, Chemistry, Biology, U.S. History, U.S. Government and Politics, Statistics, and more. In addition, many consumer science and industrial technology courses are offered. The school also offers a Young Adult Program for students 18–21 years of age, which is based at Parkland College. The student-teacher ratio is 16:1, average for the state.

== Extracurricular activities ==
=== Athletics ===
Centennial competes in interscholastic sports in the Big Twelve Conference (Illinois) of the Illinois High School Association (IHSA).

=== Fall sports ===
- Cheerleading
- Boys cross-country
- Girls cross-country
- Football
- Boys golf
- Girls golf
- Marching band
- Boys soccer
- Girls swimming and diving
- Girls tennis
- Volleyball

=== Winter sports ===
- Boys basketball
- Girls basketball
- Cheerleading
- Boys swimming and diving
- Wrestling
- Archery

=== Spring sports ===
- Baseball
- Girls soccer
- Softball
- Boys tennis
- Boys track and field
- Girls track and field

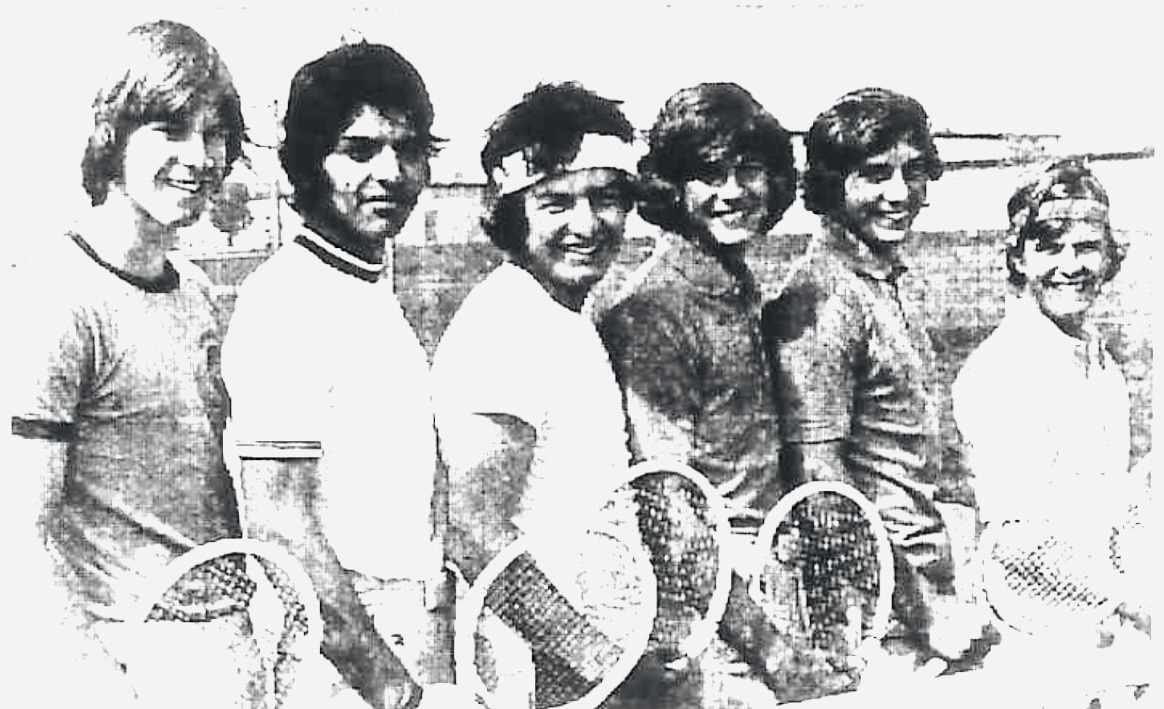
Champaign Centennial Chargers varsity tennis team May 9, 1975; from Left to Right: Vance Barr, Javier Gonzalez, Fernando Gonzalez, Doug Wentworth, Tim Iben, Paul Carter (captain); photo by Mike van Antwerp courtesy of Champaign County Newspaper Archives at Urbana Free Library

The boys tennis team won Capitol Conference and Danville District titles and placed 12th at the Illinois state championships in 1975. The coach was Donald Lee Shuman, originally from the small town of Morrison, Illinois, who had been Illinois state high school runner up in doubles in 1942 and a three-time letterman as a hurdler on the University of Illinois varsity track and field team.

The girls tennis team won consecutive Illinois state championships in 1995 and 1996.

The school's basketball team also won their first state championship game in 2009, beating Oswego 61–59. They had a repeat appearance to the state championships in 2010, taking 4th place overall.

== Performance ==
In 2006, the school was named as one of the top 50 high schools in Illinois, according to the Chicago Sun-Times. In 2006, students' ACT scores exceeded both the state and national averages by about 2 points. In 2007, the school's scores on the Prairie State Achievement Examination (PSAE) Reading and Math tests exceeded the state averages, with around 60-65% of students meeting or exceeding state standards. Currently, the school is not making Adequate Yearly Progress (AYP).

== Notable alumni ==
- Chantal Bailey, 1994 Olympics speed skating
- Bonnie Blair, five-time gold medalist and one-time bronze medalist in Olympic speed skating
- F. DuBois Bowman, President, Morehouse College
- Fernando Gonzalez Sfeir, Harvard University and Northwestern University educated medical doctor and surgeon, Board-certified in urology; philanthropist
- Matt Herges, pitcher for several MLB teams
- Reggie Hodges, punter for several NFL teams
- Dan Hornbuckle, professional mixed martial arts fighter
- James Kinney (class of 2009): professional basketball player
- Mikel Leshoure, played football for Illinois, selected by Detroit Lions in 2011 NFL draft
- Gia Lewis-Smallwood, American discus player who competed in the 2012 Summer Olympics
- Jeff Lindgren, professional baseball player
- Trent Meacham, graduate of Centennial, played on Illinois Fighting Illini men's basketball team
- Nichole Millage, two-time gold medalist & two-time silver medalist in Paralympic sitting volleyball
- Scott Nagy, basketball head coach at Southern Illinois University Carbondale
- Katherine Reutter, silver and bronze medalist in Olympic speed skating
- Rayvonte Rice, guard for 2013-2014 Illinois Fighting Illini men's basketball team
- Lou Skizas, former Major League baseball player and friend of Mickey Mantle; PE and health sciences teacher and head coach of baseball team
