= Jeremy Leman =

American football player (born 1985)

- Leman (47) during his tenure with the Fighting Illini

No. 47, 57, 54
- Position: Linebacker

Personal information
- Born: March 1, 1985 (age 41); Champaign, Illinois, U.S.
- Listed height: 6 ft 2 in (1.88 m)
- Listed weight: 240 lb (109 kg)

Career information
- High school: Champaign Central
- College: Illinois
- NFL draft: 2008: undrafted

Career history
- Minnesota Vikings (2008)*; Carolina Panthers (2009)*; Philadelphia Eagles (2009)*; San Diego Chargers (2009)*; Minnesota Vikings (2009–2010); Florida Tuskers (2010); San Diego Chargers (2010)*; Oakland Raiders (2011)*
- * Offseason or practice squad member only

Awards and highlights
- Consensus All-American (2007); 2× First-team All-Big Ten (2006, 2007)
- Stats at Pro Football Reference

Jeremy Leman (born March 1, 1985, Illinois, U.S.) is an American former professional football player who was a linebacker in the National Football League (NFL). He played college football for the Illinois Fighting Illini, earning consensus All-American honors in 2007. He was signed by the Minnesota Vikings as an undrafted free agent in 2008, and was also a member of the Oakland Raiders, Carolina Panthers, Philadelphia Eagles, and San Diego Chargers. He is currently a football analyst for the Big Ten Network.

== Early life ==
Leman (47) and Illinois' other captains take the field.

Leman was born and raised in Champaign, Illinois. He played high school football at Champaign Central High School where he played middle linebacker and tight end. During his senior year, he tallied 191 tackles and was named to the prestigious Illinois High School Football Coaches Association All-State Team.

== College career ==
Leman attended the University of Illinois, where he played for the Illinois Fighting Illini football team from 2003 to 2007. He redshirted as a true freshman in 2003. Leman was a first-team All-Big Ten selection on defense in 2006 and 2007, and was recognized as a consensus first-team All-American in 2007. He started over 40 games at linebacker during his college career. During the 2007 campaign, Leman led the Illini to nine wins and helped the team earn a trip to the Rose Bowl.

Leman stands at sixth place on Illinois' all time tackle list. His 152 tackles in the 2006 season ranked first in the Big Ten and is the sixth-best single-season effort ever posted by an Illini player. He also ranks fifth on the Illinois charts in career tackles for loss.

=== Statistics ===
Illinois		Defensive stats
Season	Games	Tackles	T/Loss	Sacks	Forced fumbles	Interceptions
2004	11	56	3	1.5	1	0
2005	11	67	5.5	0	2	0
2006	12	152	19	4	2	0
2007	13	132	10.5	2.5	1	1
Total	47	407	39.5	8.5	6	1

== Professional career ==
=== Minnesota Vikings (first stint) ===
After going undrafted in the 2008 NFL draft, Leman signed with the Minnesota Vikings as an undrafted free agent. He was waived by team during final cuts on August 30.

=== Carolina Panthers ===
After spending the 2008 season out of football, Leman signed a future contract with the Carolina Panthers on January 13, 2009. He was waived by the team as a final cut on September 5.

=== Philadelphia Eagles ===
Leman was signed to the Philadelphia Eagles practice squad on September 7, 2009. He was released by the team on October 13.

=== San Diego Chargers (first stint) ===
Leman was signed to the San Diego Chargers practice squad on November 3, 2009. He was released by the team on December 1.

=== Minnesota Vikings (second stint) ===
Leman was re-signed to the Vikings practice squad on December 9, 2009, and was promoted to the active roster on December 15, after linebacker Erin Henderson was suspended for four games.

He was released by the team with an injury settlement on October 19, 2010.

=== Florida Tuskers ===
Leman was signed by the Florida Tuskers of the United Football League on November 1, 2010.

=== San Diego Chargers (second stint) ===
Leman was signed to the Chargers practice squad on November 30, 2010. He was waived by the team on August 30, 2011.

=== Oakland Raiders ===
The Oakland Raiders claimed Leman off of waivers on August 31.

Oakland then cut Leman on September 3, 2011, when they announced their 53-man roster for the 2011 season. However, the following day, the Raiders named Leman to their eight-man practice squad for the 2011 season. He was cut from the practice squad on December 6.

== Personal life ==
Leman graduated from the University of Illinois with a speech communication degree and a master's degree in human resource education.
