= Henry H. Meyer =

Henry Herman Meyer (21 November 1874 in Champaign, Illinois – 1951) was an American Methodist Episcopal clergyman and editor.

== Biography ==
He was educated at California State Normal School; German Wallace College, Ohio; the Drew Theological Seminary; Teachers College, Columbia; and at Jena. He was ordained in the ministry in 1900.

He filled pastorates in Wilmington, California, and Mount Vernon, New York. He was professor at Saint Paul College, Minnesota, in 1900-01, and in 1903 became assistant editor of the Methodist Episcopal Sunday School publications, becoming editor in 1914. In 1911 he served as secretary of the Sunday School Council of the United States and Canada, and he became a member of the executive council of the Religious Education Association.

== Works ==
- The Lesson Handbook (annual beginning 1904)
- Stencil Maps and Missionary Chalk Talks (1904)
- The Graded Sunday School in Principle and Practice (1910)
