= Burnham 310 =

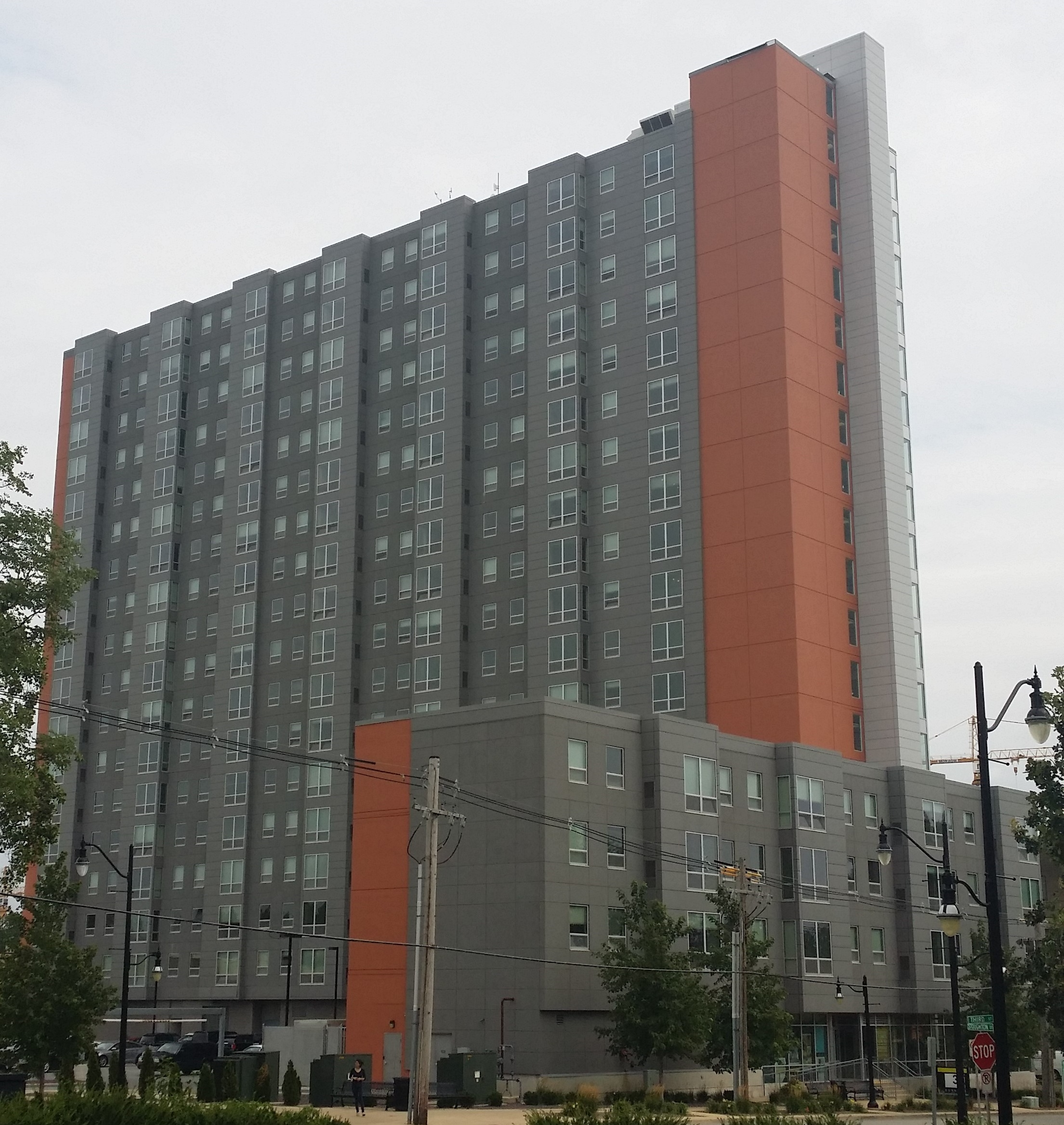
- Southeast view of Burnham 310
- Interactive map of the Burnham 310 area

General information
- Status: Completed
- Type: Residential
- Location: 310 East Springfield Ave., Campustown, Champaign, Illinois, U.S.
- Coordinates: 40.1129°N 88.2346°W
- Construction started: December 2006
- Completed: September 2008
- Cost: $US44 million

Height
- Height: 244 ft (74 m)

Technical details
- Floor count: 18

Design and construction
- Architecture firm: VOA Associates
- Main contractor: Construction Reality

Other information
- Number of rooms: 259 apartments

Burnham 310 is a skyscraper in Champaign, Illinois, United States. Construction was started in December 2006 and completed in September 2008 after months of planning, development and delayed construction. Originally, the city block at 310 East Springfield Avenue had been occupied by the area's first hospital. The establishment of the Burnham City Hospital was proposed in 1935, the same year as the Champaign City Building. Under the Public Works Administration program, which was established as part of the New Deal of 1933 during President Franklin D. Roosevelt's first term, both building proposals qualified for federal grant funding.

In 1989, the Burnham City Hospital merged with Mercy Hospital to form Provena Covenant Medical Center and, in 1992, most services were consolidated which caused the Burnham to close. The structure then stood vacant for 14 years until it was razed in summer 2004.

== Building design ==
The tower was designed by VOA Associates, and was intended to be the cornerstone of the "Burnham District" that would link Campustown near the University of Illinois at Urbana-Champaign campus with Downtown Champaign. Upon its completion in 2008, Burnham 310 became the tallest building in the Champaign–Urbana metropolitan area, surpassing the Tower at Third. However, the building has been surpassed in height by 309 Green in 2009, and by HERE Champaign in 2015.

The first floor of the tower is occupied by sales office space for Greystar Communities and Apartments. Attached to the east side of the tower is a Niemanns grocery store (previously County Market).

== Neighborhood impact ==
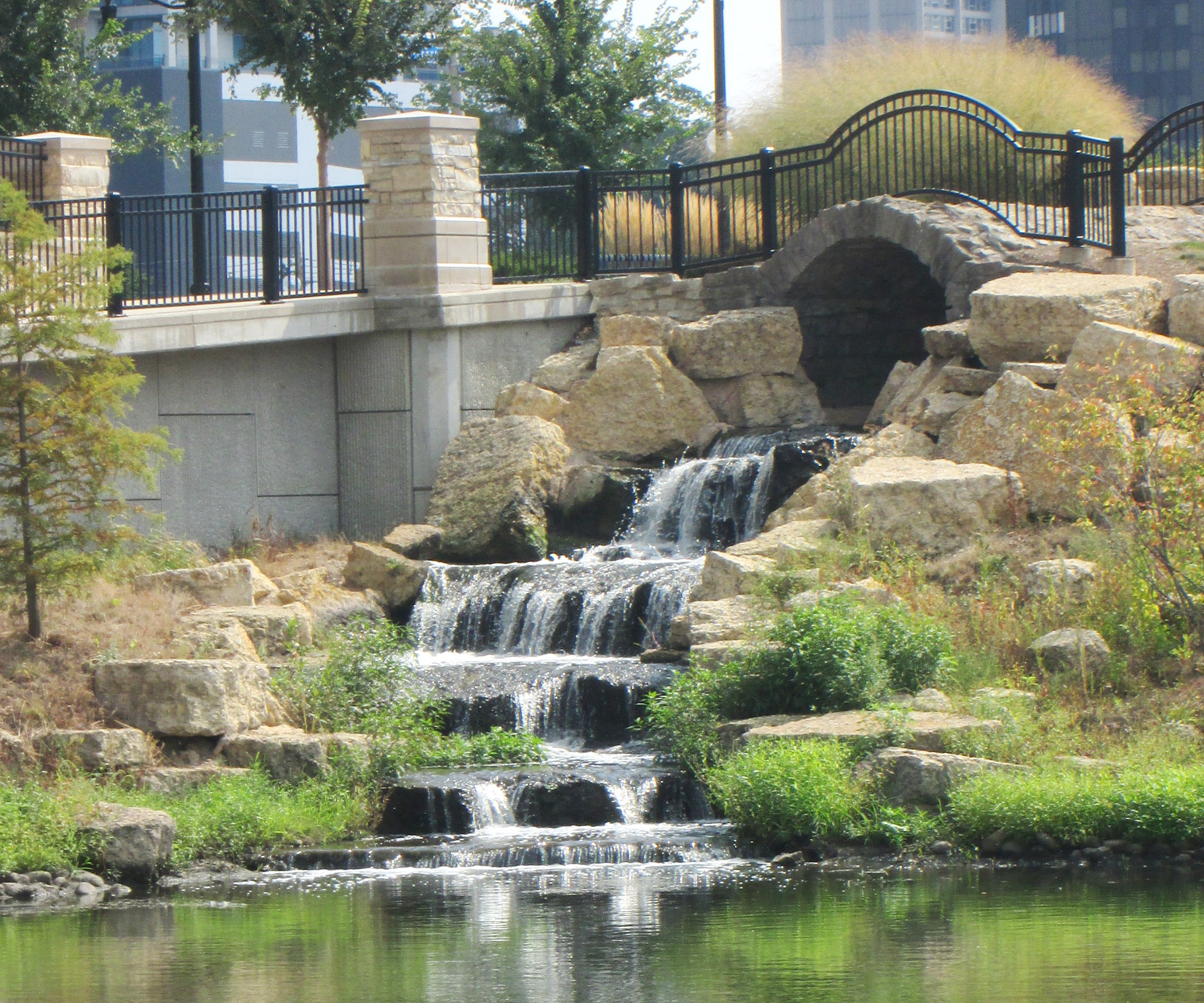
North view of the Stone Arch Bridge

Because of the completion of Burnham 310, the Champaign Park District made improvements to Scott Park. New playground equipment and landscaping updates were completed during summer 2009. The Stone Arch Bridge was structurally improved.
