= Campustown =

Campustown may refer to:

- Campustown (Champaign, Illinois), a locality of Champaign, Illinois, United States
- a locality of Ames, Iowa, United States
