= Stone Arch Bridge (Champaign, Illinois) =

- U.S. National Register of Historic Places
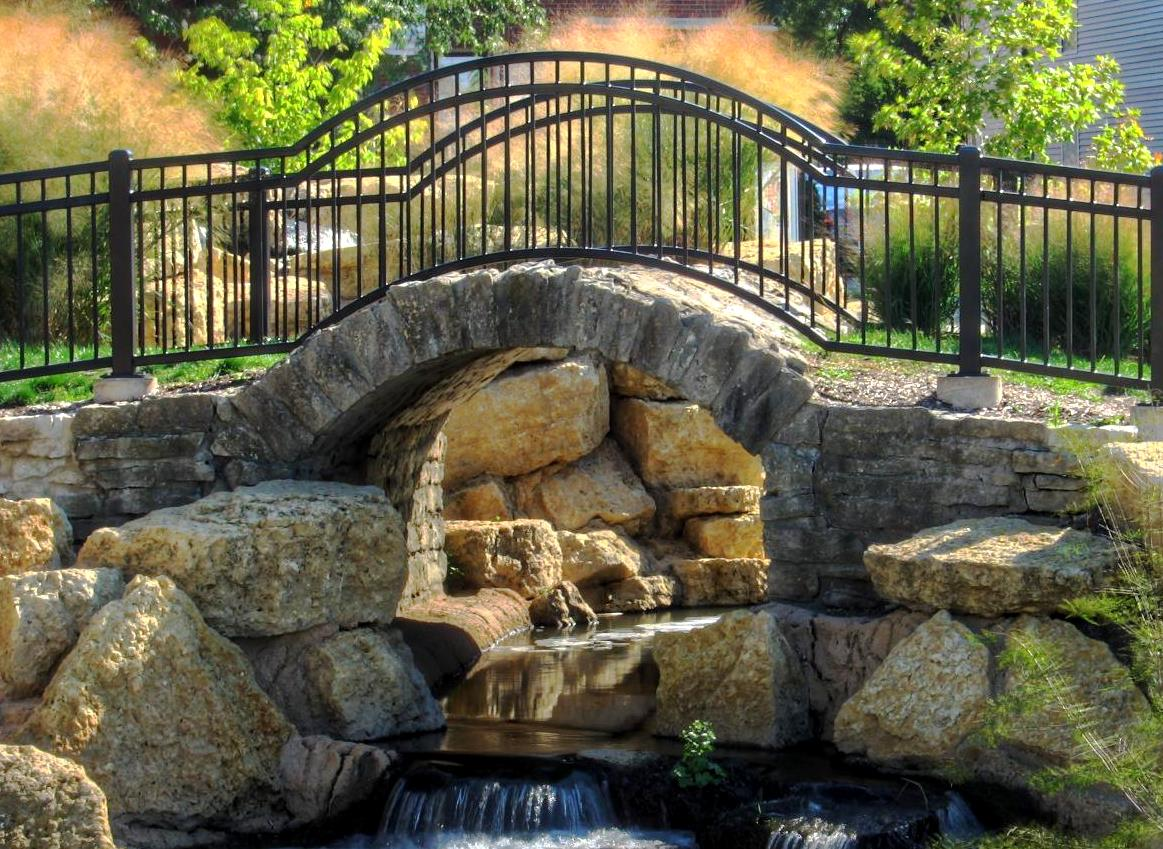
- (2012)

- Location within Illinois Location within the United States
- Location: near Springfield Ave. and 2nd St. Champaign, Illinois
- Coordinates: 40°6′46″N 88°14′14″W
- Area: 0.1 acres (0.040 ha)
- Built: 1860
- NRHP reference No.: 81000210
- Added to NRHP: May 14, 1981

The Stone Arch Bridge, located near the intersection East Springfield Avenue and South Second Street in Champaign, Illinois was built in 1860. In c.2010, it was integrated into the design of the Boneyard Creek Second Street Basin, a flood control facility and recreational amenity which is located between First and Second Streets and Springfield and University Avenues.

The bridge was listed on the National Register of Historic Places in 1981.
