= Campustown (Champaign, Illinois) =

Neighborhood of Champaign, Illinois, U.S.

Campustown University District
- District
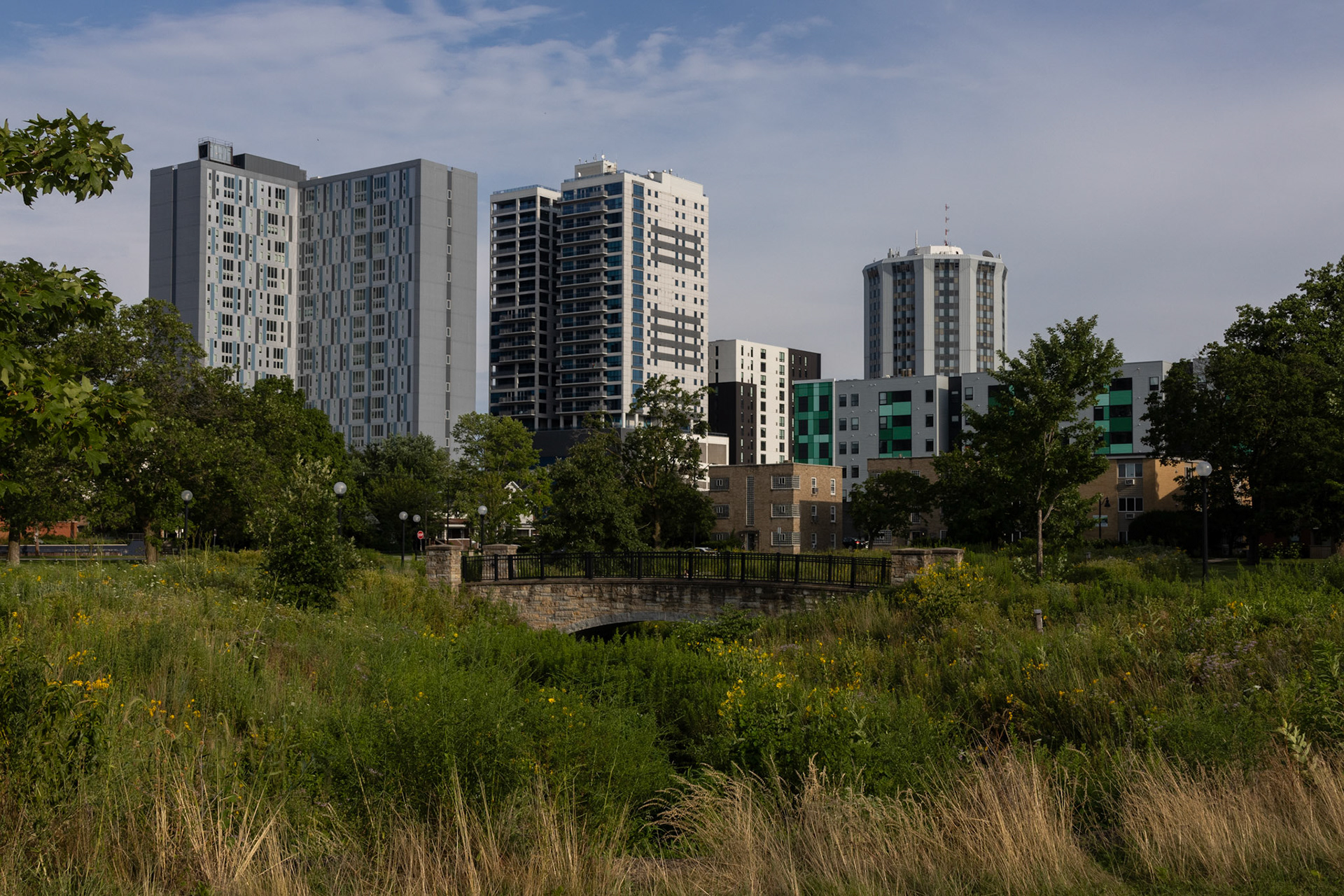
- Campustown as seen from Scott Park in 2024.
- Interactive map of Campustown
- Country: United States
- State: Illinois
- County: Champaign County
- City: Champaign
- Established: 1920s
- Named for: University of Illinois at Urbana–Champaign Campus
- City Council District: 1, 2, 4

Government
  - City Council Member: Davion Williams; Alicia Beck; Michael Foellmer
- Time zone: UTC-6 (CST)
  - Summer (DST): UTC-5 (CDT)
- Postal code: 61820
- Area code: 217
- Website: champaigncenter.com

Campustown is an area in Champaign, Illinois. Centered on Green Street, the district contains about eight city blocks occupied by various small businesses, restaurants, bars, and apartment buildings which mostly house university students. Campustown is located along the west side of the University of Illinois Urbana–Champaign campus.

Notable landmarks include the Alma Mater, The Tower at Third, 309 Green, Legend's Bar & Grill, KAMS, Red Lion, and Murphy's Pub.

== Master streetscape plan ==
In 1995, then University of Illinois at Urbana–Champaign Provost Michael Aiken constructed a planning committee, referred to as the Campustown 2000 Task Force, in an effort to revitalize the deteriorating infrastructure in the Campustown district. As the committee's chairperson, Aiken hoped to transform the district into a safer, more inviting area for university students and visitors. The committee was composed of representatives from the cities of Champaign, its twin city Urbana, the Champaign County Chamber of Commerce, the C-U Economic Partnership, land and business owners within Campustown and the University of Illinois.

Since the creation of the district, Campustown's main thoroughfare, East Green Street, carried four lanes of vehicular traffic, despite serving a mostly pedestrian-based commercial district for the university. Campustown's deteriorating infrastructure was highlighted when a student was killed by vehicular traffic and during the 2002 NFL season when the Chicago Bears played their home games at Memorial Stadium during the renovation of Soldier Field.

The Campustown 2000 Task Force was instrumental in moving the development of Green Street and the rest of Campustown. This group initiated two efforts, the Campus Area Transformation Study (CATS) and the Campustown Action Plan, that outlined important changes that needed to be made in order to create a safer and more welcoming environment for students and others visiting the location. Coupled with the Campustown Existing Conditions Report, created by the City of Champaign Planning Department between 1996 and 1998, the Champaign City Council was able to approve plans for a seven million dollar project, which was completed in 2003. Green Street was reconstructed from Wright to Fourth Streets and various safety features were added such as new street-lights, railings, large planters, and proper signage. Campustown's speed limit was also reduced to 25 mph (40 km/h) and Green Street was reduced to two lanes of traffic, with bike lanes on each shoulder. To facilitate the construction of a new Champaign-Urbana Mass Transit District bus stop, Wright Street was converted to a pedestrian mall allowing bus access only between Chalmers and John Streets. Since the creation of the Transit Plaza, it has become the largest bus stop in the Champaign–Urbana metropolitan area.

The resulting streetscape of Campustown has been very well-received, and is so far considered a resounding success. It achieved a number of the goals set forth in the Campustown Action Plan, most notable Goal II, "Develop an Overall Look for the Campustown Area," and Goal III, "Maintain and Improve Campustown Infrastructure." In order to build on the successes of the Campustown Action Plan, and also further its goals, the City of Champaign developed the University District Streetscape Master Plan in Fall of 2003. This plan not only focuses on the Green Street area, but highlights changes to be made throughout the entire University District. The planned improvements differ by each street, and are broken down into three categories: the Commercial Area, the Transition Area, and the Neighborhood Area. The full plan discusses proposed changes to the infrastructure of each area type, and goes over estimated costs as well as projects that should be prioritized over others

== Urban core development ==
Over the past 10 years, since the completion of the Campustown 2000 project, the Campustown skyline and streetscape has drastically transformed. While the Tower at Third high-rise, which stands 205 ft (62 m), was completed in 1972, another high-rise had not been built in Campustown until after the completion of Campustown 2000. In 2008, two high-rise residential towers opened for residents, 309 Green and Burnham 310. The 2008 Economic Recession nixed plans for another high-rise at 311 Green, which would have been a "sister building" to 309 Green, though the same developers have submitted plans for an 8-story apartment building at Fourth and Green.

Since the start of 2013, construction projects have restarted in campustown. Bankier Apartments has contracted Broeren-Russo Company of Champaign to build their 14-story residential high-rise at 519 East Green. The tower was completed just before the summer of 2014. Under construction are the 22-story 308-312 East Green Street and US$20 million 526 East Green Street mixed residential and commercial buildings.

=== Tallest buildings ===
Below is a listing of the tallest buildings in Champaign's Campustown district, by height.

Rank	Name	Height ft (m)	Floors	Year	Street address	Image
1	309 Green	268 (82)	24	2009	309 East Green St.	
2	HERE Champaign	267 (81)	27	2015	308 East Green St.	
3	Burnham 310	224 (68)	18	2008	310 East Springfield Ave.	
4	The Tower at Third	205 (62)	21	1972	302 East John St.	
5	Skyline Tower	169 (52)	14	2014	519 East Green St.	
6	Illini Tower	166 (51)	17	1967	409 East Chalmers St.	
7	Bromley Hall	151 (46)	14	1967	910 South Third St.	
8	Sherman Hall	127 (39)	13	1966	909 South Fifth St.	
9	Park Place Tower	108 (33)	9	2003	202 East Green St.	
10	Green Street Towers	96 (29)	8	2001	616 East Green St.	

== Gallery ==
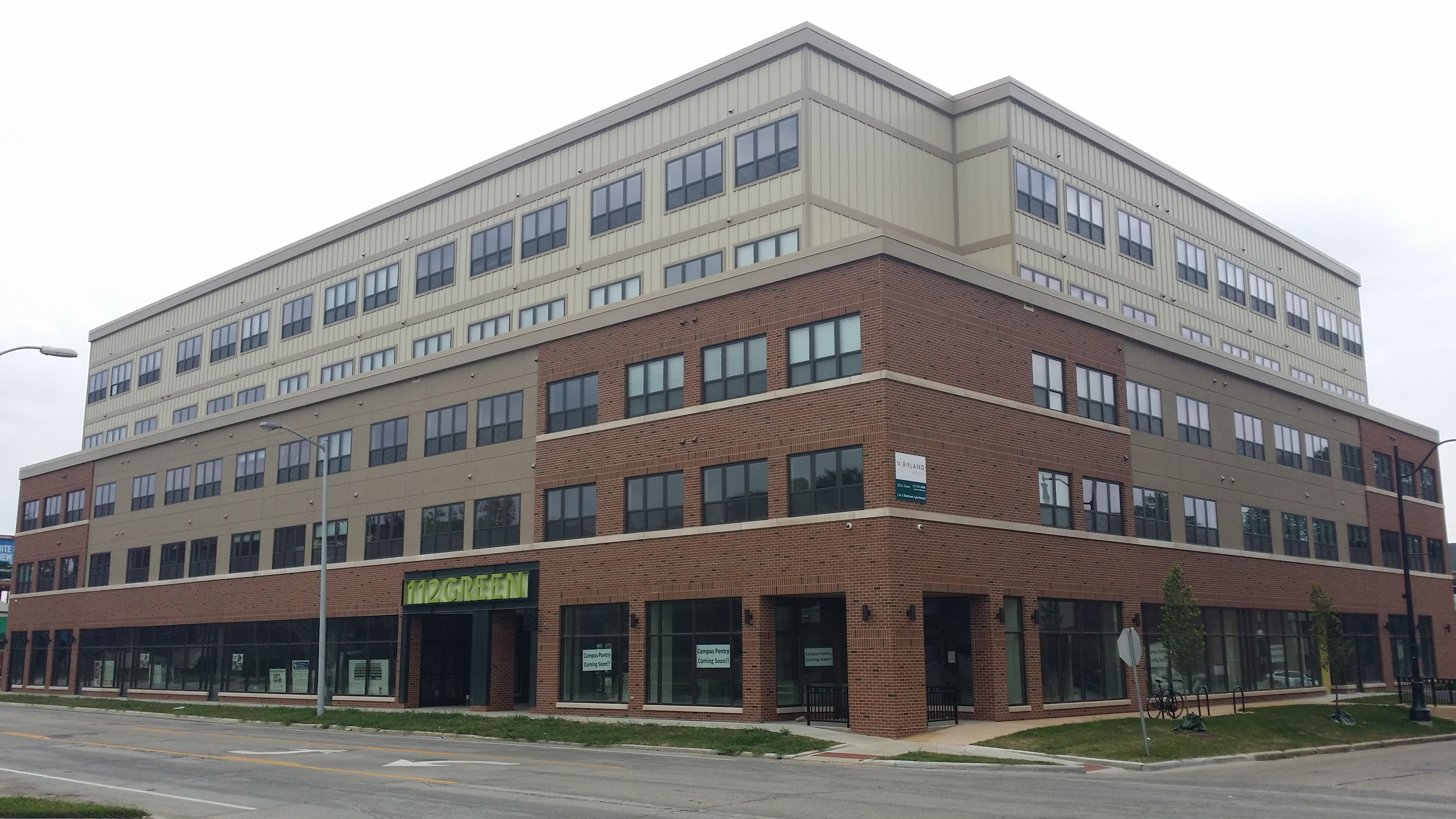
Northwest facing view of 112 Green

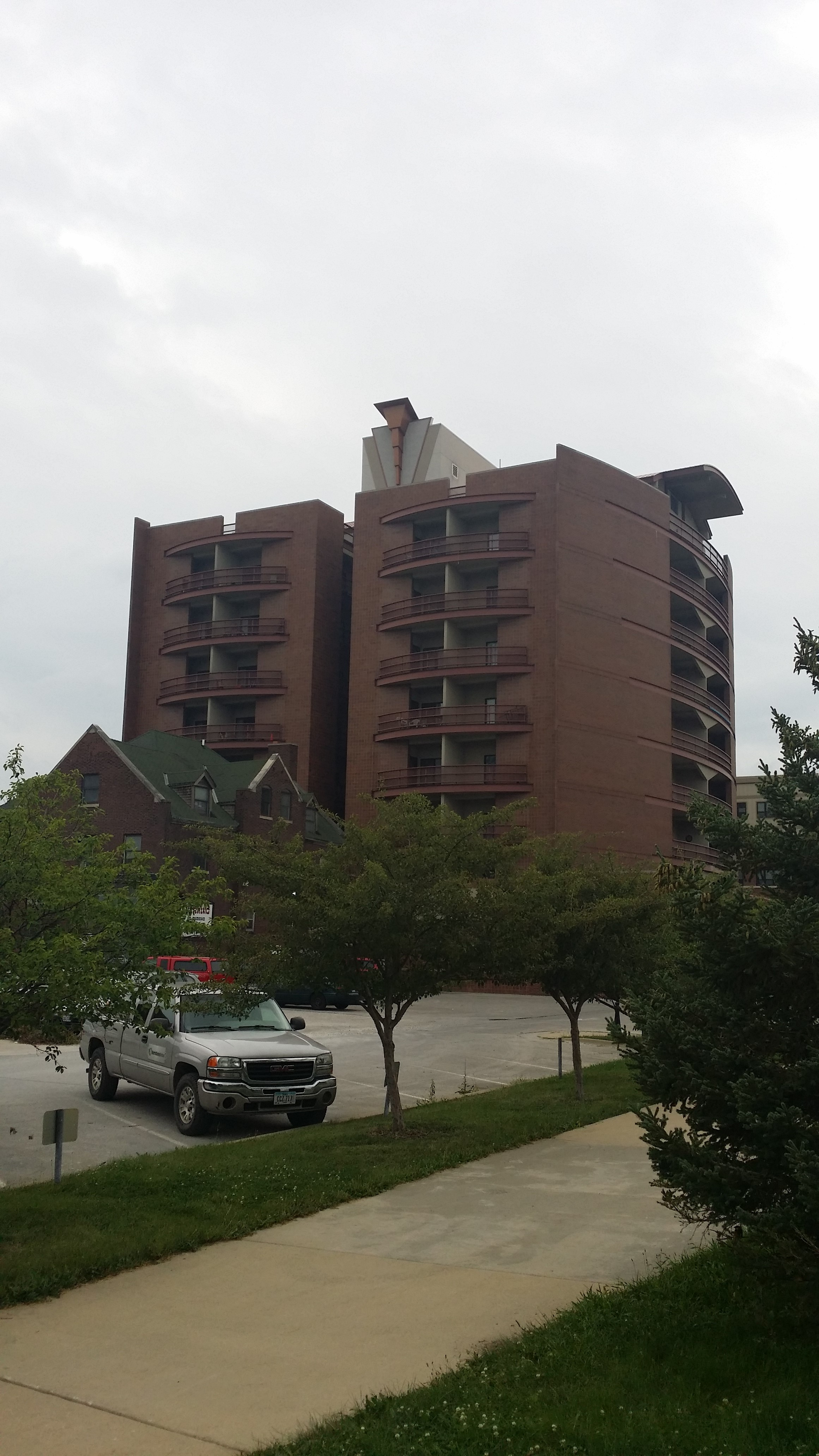
West facing view of Park Place Tower

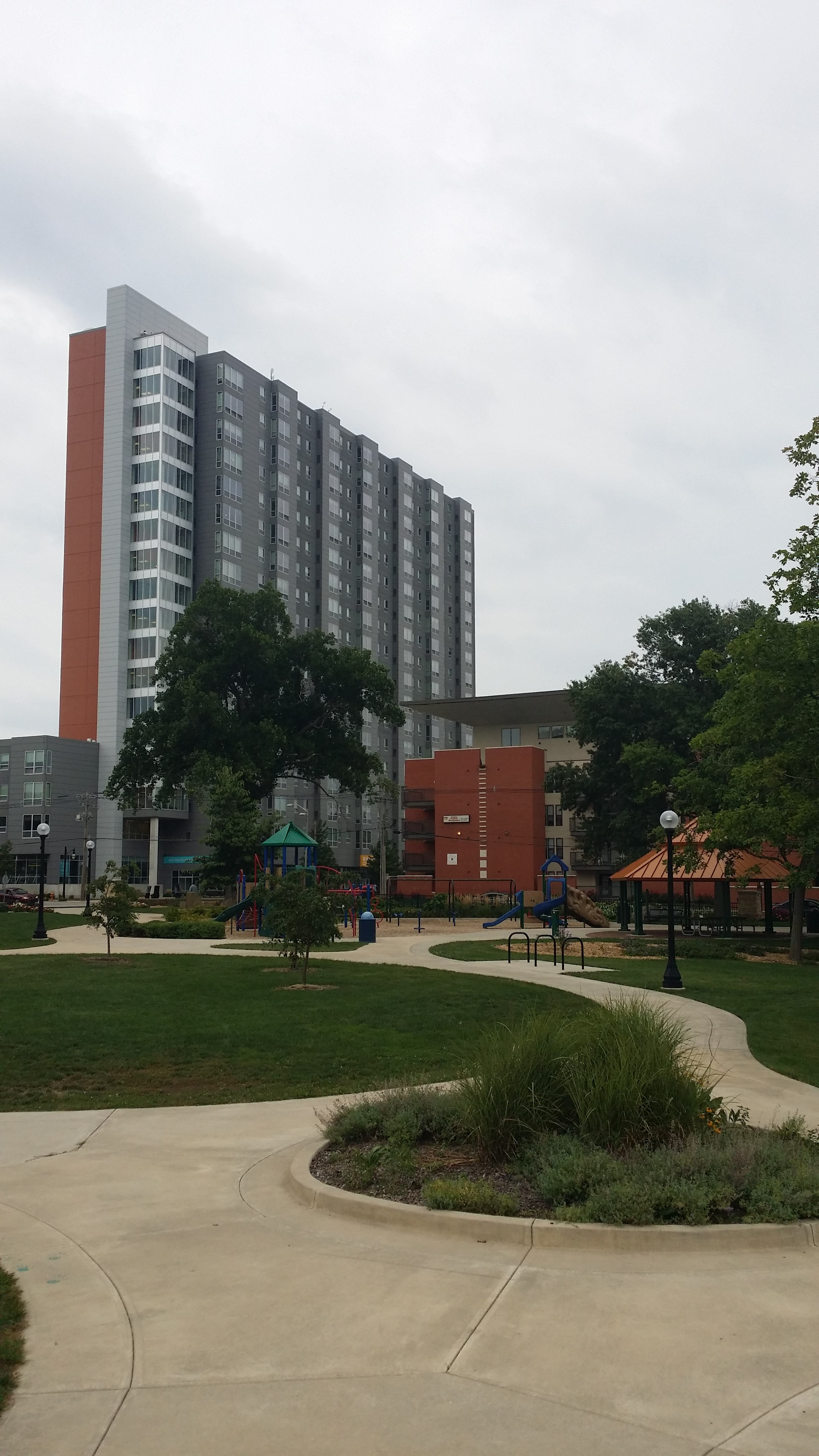
Northeast facing view of Burnham 310 from Scott Park

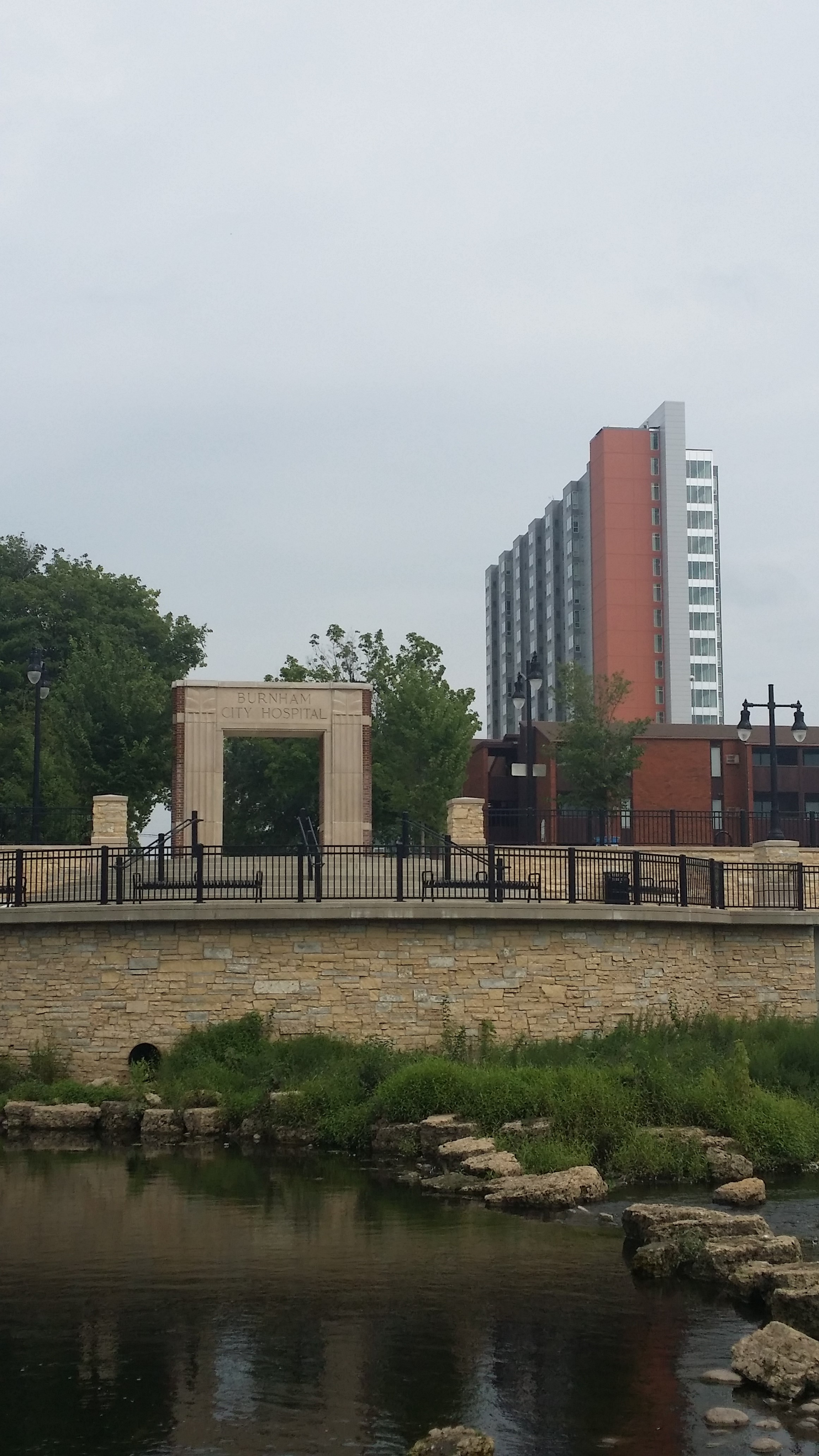
East facing view of the memorial dedicated to the Burnham City Hospital that once stood where the Burnham 310 building is now located.

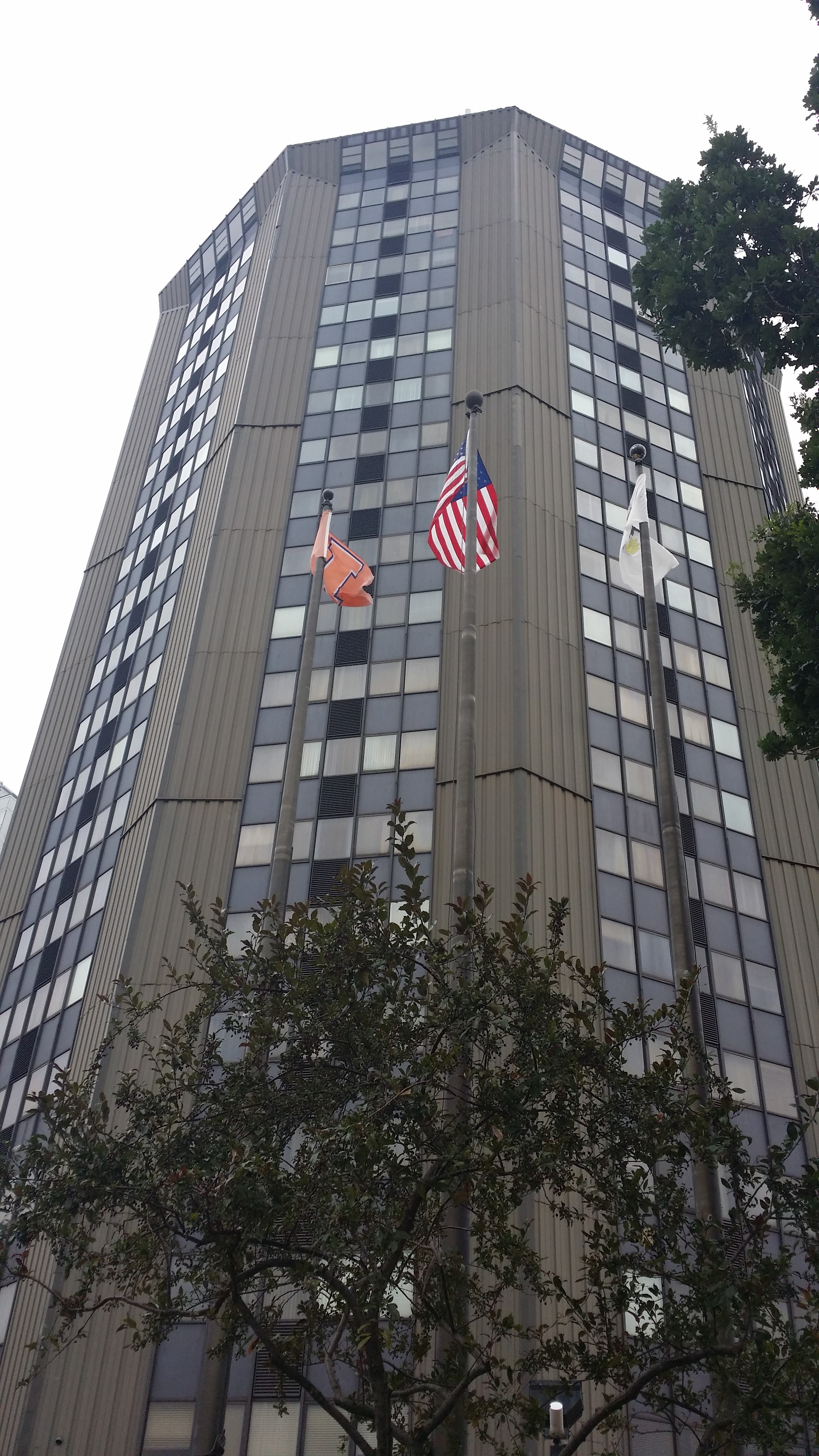
Northeast facing view of the Tower at Third

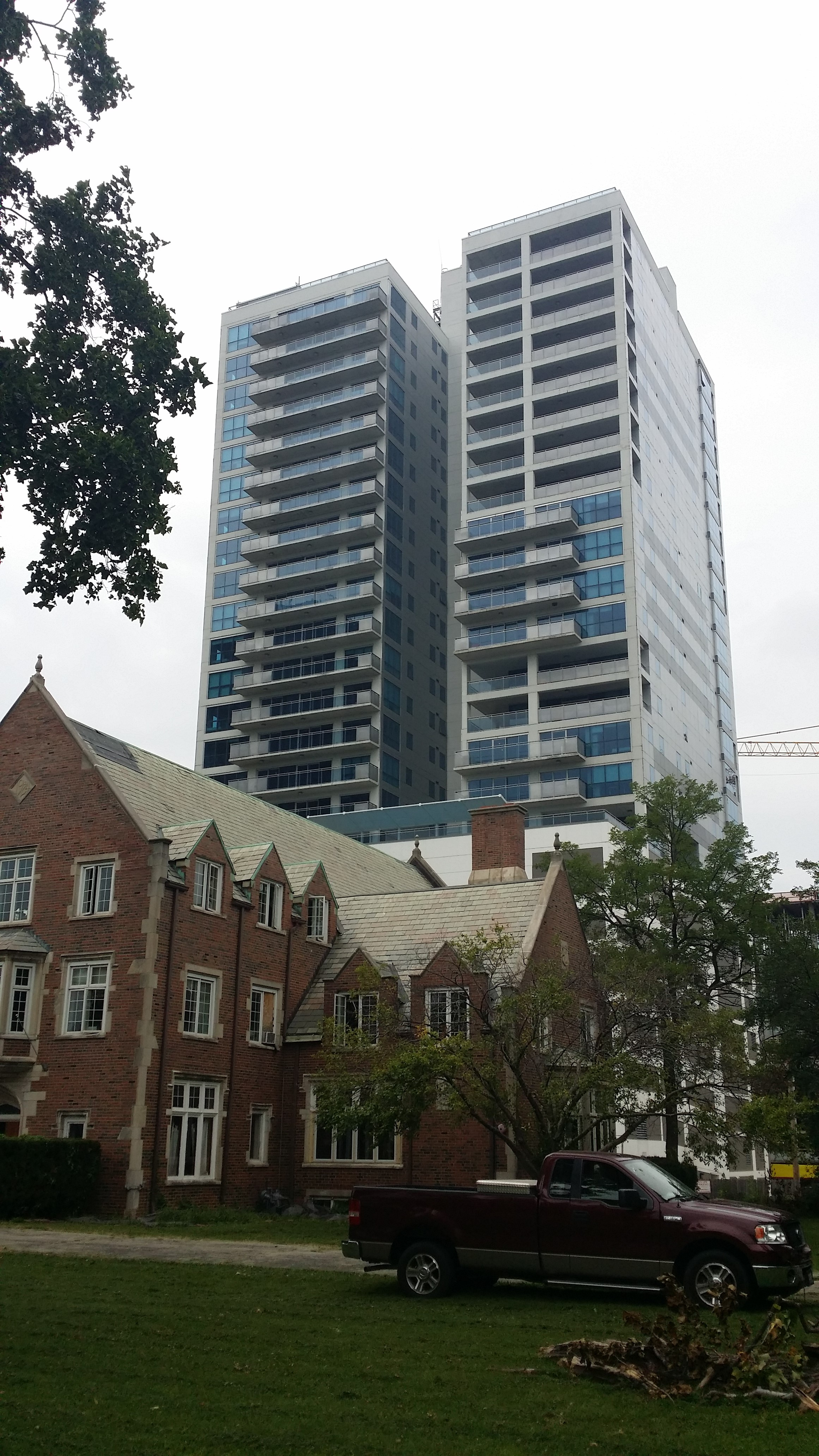
North facing view of 309 Green

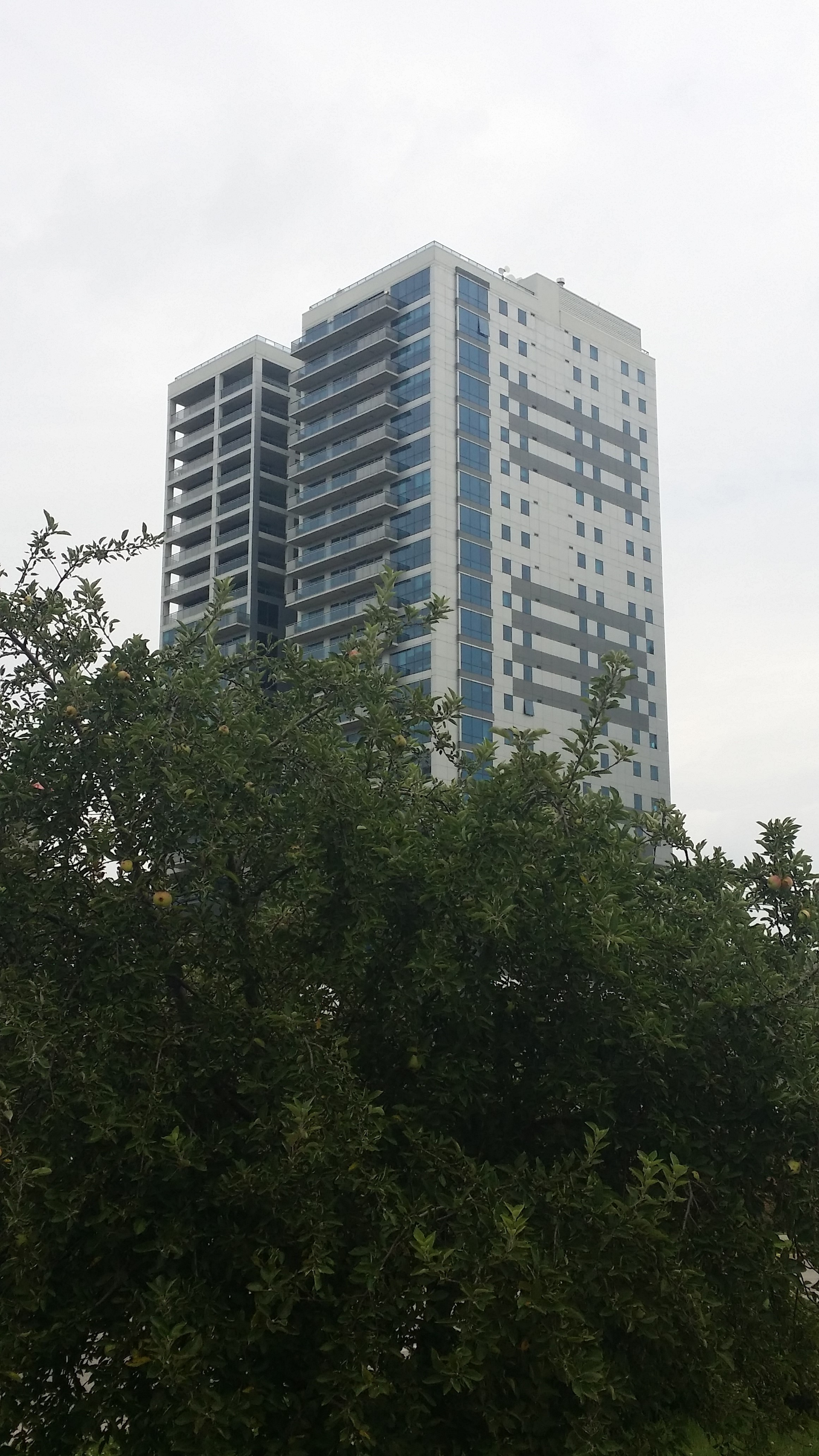
Southeast facing view of 309 Green

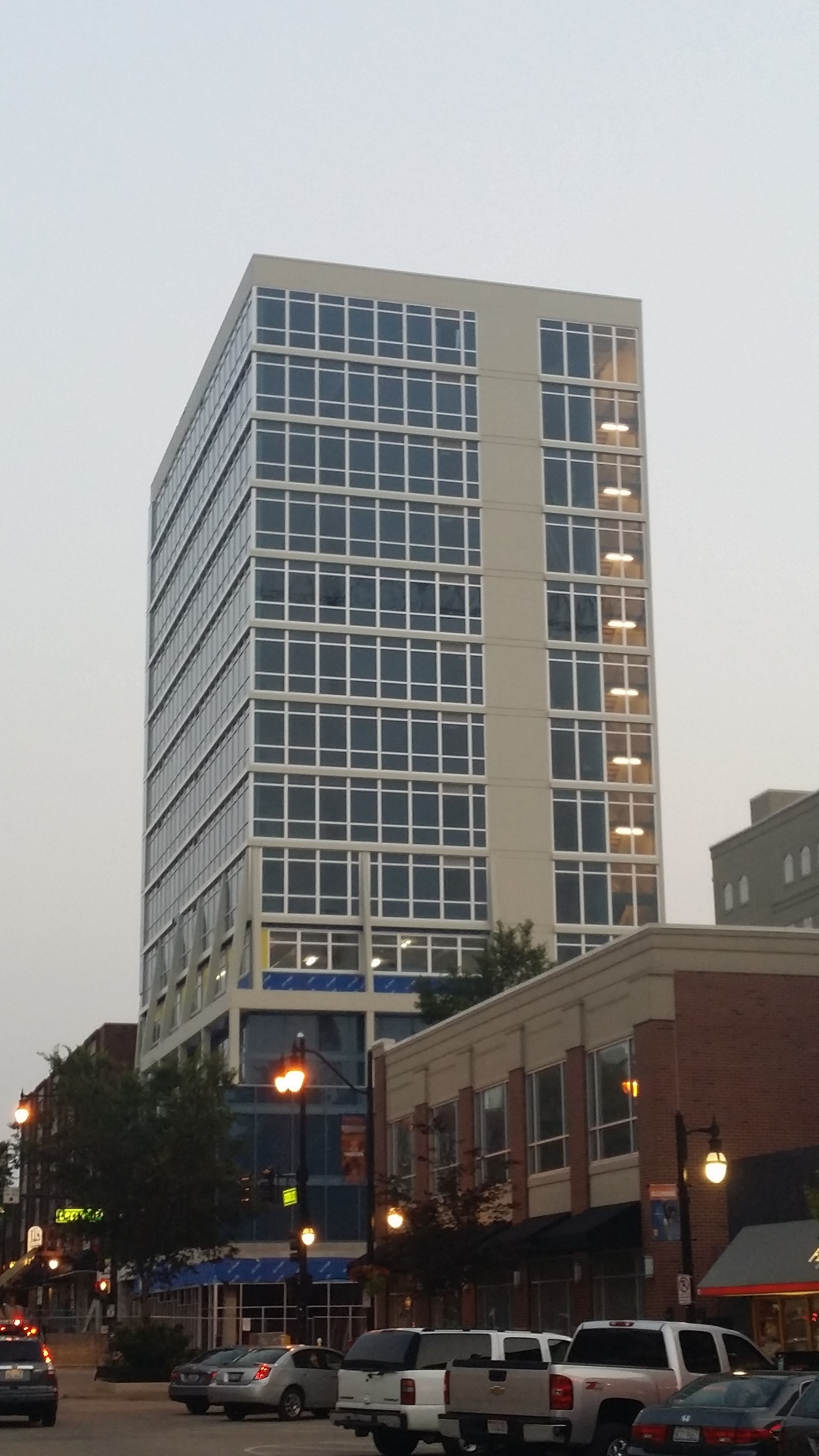
South facing view of Skyline Tower
