= List of radio stations in Illinois =

The following is a list of FCC-licensed radio stations in the U.S. state of Illinois, which can be sorted by their call signs, frequencies, cities of license, licensees, and programming formats.

== List of radio stations ==
Call sign	Frequency	City of license	Licensee	Format
KLIS	590 AM	Wood River	Zobrist Media, LLC	Talk
KPNT	105.7 FM	Collinsville	St. Louis FCC License Sub, LLC	Alternative rock
KQCJ	93.9 FM	Cambridge	Virden Broadcasting Corp.	Alternative rock
KSGM	980 AM	Chester	Donze Communications, Inc.	Country/News/Talk
KTLK-FM	104.9 FM	Columbia	iHM Licenses, LLC	Conservative talk
KUUL	101.3 FM	East Moline	iHM Licenses, LLC	Top 40 (CHR)
KXBS	95.5 FM	Bethalto	Gateway Creative Broadcasting, Inc.	Christian CHR
WAAG	94.9 FM	Galesburg	Galesburg Broadcasting Company	Country
WEAD	88.5 FM	Sheridan	Silver Fish Broadcasting, Inc.	
WAGI-LP	97.5 FM	Kankakee	First Assembly of God Church	Religious
WAJK	99.3 FM	La Salle	Starved Rock Media, Inc.	Hot adult contemporary
WAKO	910 AM	Lawrenceville	DLC Media, Inc.	Country
WAKO-FM	103.1 FM	Lawrenceville	DLC Media, Inc.	Adult contemporary
WALS	102.1 FM	Oglesby	Shaw Local Radio Co.	Country
WAOX	105.3 FM	Staunton	Talley Broadcasting Corporation	Hot adult contemporary
WAPO	90.5 FM	Mount Vernon	American Family Association	Religious talk (AFR)
WARG	88.9 FM	Summit	Community High School District #217	Alternative
WARH	106.5 FM	Granite City	St. Louis FCC License Sub, LLC	Adult hits
WAUR	1550 AM	Somonauk	Grundy County Broadcasters, Inc.	Country
WAWE	94.3 FM	Glendale Heights	Educational Media Foundation	Worship music (Air1)
WAWF	88.3 FM	Kankakee	Family Worship Center Church, Inc.	Religious
WAWJ	90.1 FM	Marion	American Family Association	Inspirational (AFR)
WAWY	103.9 FM	Dundee	Educational Media Foundation	Worship music (Air1)
WAXR	88.1 FM	Geneseo	American Family Association	Religious Talk (AFR)
WAZU	90.7 FM	Peoria	Sirius Syncope Inc.	Urban
WBBA-FM	97.5 FM	Pittsfield	GBI Communications, LLC	Country
WBBE	97.9 FM	Heyworth	Neuhoff Media Bloomington, LLC	Adult hits
WBBM	780 AM	Chicago	Audacy License, LLC	News
WBBM-FM	96.3 FM	Chicago	Audacy License, LLC	Rhythmic Top 40
WBEK	91.1 FM	Kankakee	Chicago Public Media, Inc.	Public radio
WBEL	1380 AM	South Beloit	Big Radio	1990s' hits
WBEL-FM	88.5 FM	Cairo	American Family Association	Inspirational (AFR)
WBEQ	90.7 FM	Morris	Chicago Public Media	Public radio
WBEZ	91.5 FM	Chicago	Chicago Public Media	Public radio
WBGL	91.7 FM	Champaign	University of Northwestern – St. Paul	Christian adult contemporary
WBGX	1570 AM	Harvey	Great Lakes Radio-Chicago, LLC	Gospel
WBGZ	1570 AM	Alton	Metroplex Communications, Inc.	News/Talk
WBIG	1280 AM	Aurora	Auril Broadcasting LLC	Talk/Home Shopping/Sports (FSR)
WBJW	91.7 FM	Albion	Music Ministries Inc	Christian
WBMF	88.1 FM	Crete	Family Worship Center Church, Inc.	Christian
WBMV	89.7 FM	Mount Vernon	University of Northwestern – St. Paul	Christian adult contemporary
WBMX	104.3 FM	Chicago	Audacy License, LLC	Classic hip hop
WBNH	88.5 FM	Pekin	Central Illinois Radio Fellowship, Inc.	Christian
WBNQ	101.5 FM	Bloomington	Cumulus Licensing LLC	Pop contemporary hit radio
WBVN	104.5 FM	Carrier Mills	Kenneth W. And Jane A. Anderson	Contemporary Christian
WBWN	104.1 FM	Le Roy	Cumulus Licensing LLC	Country
WBYS	1560 AM	Canton	Spoon River Media, LLC	Country
WBZG	100.9 FM	Peru	Shaw Local Radio Co.	Classic rock
WCAZ	1510 AM	Macomb	Hancock County Broadcasting, LLC	Full-service Classic country
WCBH	104.3 FM	Casey	The Cromwell Group, Inc. of Illinois	Top 40 (CHR)
WCBU	89.9 FM	Peoria	Bradley University	News & Information
WCBW-FM	89.7 FM	East St. Louis	University of Northwestern – St. Paul	Christian adult contemporary
WCCI	100.3 FM	Savanna	Carroll County Communications, Inc.	Country
WCCQ	98.3 FM	Crest Hill	Alpha Media Licensee LLC	Country
WCEZ	93.9 FM	Carthage	Keokuk Broadcasting Inc	Classic hits
WCFL	104.7 FM	Morris	University of Northwestern – St. Paul	Christian adult contemporary
WCFS-FM	105.9 FM	Elmwood Park	Audacy License, LLC	News
WCFS-LP	105.9 FM	Du Quoin	Christian Fellowship Church	Religious
WCGO	1590 AM	Evanston	Evanston Broadcasting LLC	Ethnic
WCHI-FM	95.5 FM	Chicago	iHM Licenses, LLC	Mainstream rock
WCIC	91.5 FM	Pekin	University of Northwestern – St. Paul	Christian adult contemporary
WCIL	1020 AM	Carbondale	MRR License LLC	News/Talk
WCIL-FM	101.5 FM	Carbondale	MRR License LLC	Top 40 (CHR)
WCKG	1530 AM	Elmhurst	DuPage Radio, LLC	Sports (FSR)
WCKL	97.9 FM	Chicago	Educational Media Foundation	Christian adult contemporary (K-Love)
WCLR	92.5 FM	DeKalb	Educational Media Foundation	Christian adult contemporary (K-Love)
WCMY	1430 AM	Ottawa	NRG License Sub, LLC	News/Talk
WCOY	99.5 FM	Quincy	Staradio Corporation	Country
WCPT	820 AM	Willow Springs	WYPA, Inc.	Progressive talk
WCPY	92.7 FM	Arlington Heights	WKIE, Inc.	Polish
WCRA	1090 AM	Effingham	The Cromwell Group, Inc. of Illinois	News/Talk
WCRC	95.7 FM	Effingham	The Cromwell Group, Inc. of Illinois	Country
WCRX	88.1 FM	Chicago	Columbia College	Dance
WCSF	88.7 FM	Joliet	College of St. Francis	Alternative
WCSJ-FM	103.1 FM	Morris	Grundy County Broadcasters, Inc.	Classic hits/Oldies, News/Talk
WCSW	88.1 FM	Arrowsmith	2820 Communications Inc	
WCVS-FM	99.7 FM	Hillsboro	Neuhoff Media Springfield, LLC	Classic hits
WCXO	96.7 FM	Carlyle	Clinton County Broadcasting, Inc.	Adult hits
WCXP-LP	107.1 FM	Chicago	Chicago Independent Radio Project	Variety
WDAN	1490 AM	Danville	Neuhoff Media Danville, LLC	News/Talk
WDBQ-FM	107.5 FM	Galena	Townsquare License, LLC	Classic hits
WDBR	103.7 FM	Springfield	Saga Communications of Illinois, LLC	Top 40 (CHR)
WDBX	91.1 FM	Carbondale	Heterodyne Broadcasting Company	Community radio
WDCB	90.9 FM	Glen Ellyn	College of Du Page, District 502	Public radio, Jazz
WDCR	88.9 FM	Oreana	St. Mary's Hospital, Decatur	Catholic talk
WDDD-FM	107.3 FM	Johnston City	Withers Broadcasting of Southern Illinois, LLC	Country
WDGC-FM	88.3 FM	Downers Grove	WDGC-FM, School District #99	Variety
WDKB	94.9 FM	DeKalb	Long Nine, Inc.	Hot adult contemporary
WDKR	107.3 FM	Maroa	WDKR, Inc.	Oldies
WDLJ	97.5 FM	Breese	KM Radio of Breese, L.L.C.	Classic rock
WDLM	960 AM	East Moline	The Moody Bible Institute of Chicago	Christian
WDLM-FM	89.3 FM	East Moline	The Moody Bible Institute of Chicago	Christian
WDML	106.9 FM	Woodlawn	WDML, LLC	Classic rock
WDNL	102.1 FM	Danville	Neuhoff Media Danville, LLC	Adult contemporary
WDQN	1580 AM	Duquoin	Duquoin Broadcasting Company, A General Partnership	Silent
WDQN-FM	95.9 FM	Duquoin	Three Angels Broadcasting Network, Inc.	Religious
WDRV	97.1 FM	Chicago	Chicago FCc License Sub, LLC	Classic rock
WDUK	99.3 FM	Havana	Illinois Valley Radio	Country
WDWS	1400 AM	Champaign	Champaign Multimedia Group, LLC	News/Talk
WDWS-FM	107.9 FM	Arcola	Champaign Multimedia Group, LLC	Country
WDYS	1480 AM	Somonauk	Nelson Multimedia, Inc.	Adult standards
WDZ	1050 AM	Decatur	Neuhoff Media Decatur, LLC	Sports (FSR)
WDZQ	95.1 FM	Decatur	Neuhoff Media Decatur, LLC	Country
WEAI	107.1 FM	Lynnville	Jacksonville Area Radio Broadcasters, Inc.	Hot adult contemporary
WEBQ	1240 AM	Harrisburg	WEBQ, LLC	Country
WEBQ-FM	102.3 FM	Eldorado	WEBQ, LLC	Soft adult contemporary
WEEF	1430 AM	Deerfield	Polnet Communications, Ltd.	Ethnic
WEFI	89.5 FM	Effingham	American Family Association	Religious talk (AFR)
WEFT	90.1 FM	Champaign	WEFT/Prairie Air, Inc.	Community radio
WEGN	88.7 FM	Kankakee	The Power Foundation	Southern gospel (The Life FM)
WEIC	1270 AM	Charleston	Kaskaskia Broadcasting, Inc.	News/Talk
WEIU	88.9 FM	Charleston	Eastern Illinois University	Adult contemporary/Mix
WEJT	105.1 FM	Shelbyville	The Cromwell Group, Inc. of Illinois	Adult hits
WEMV-LP	103.1 FM	Vandalia	Elijah Message Ministry	Christian
WEPS	88.9 FM	Elgin	Board of Education School District U-46	High school/Classical
WERV-FM	95.9 FM	Aurora	Alpha Media Licensee LLC	Classic alternative
WESN	88.1 FM	Bloomington	Illinois Wesleyan University	Alternative
WEUR	1490 AM	Oak Park	CSWWII, LLC	Polish
WEZC	95.9 FM	Clinton	Kaskaskia Broadcasting, Inc.	Adult standards
WFAV	95.1 FM	Kankakee	Milner Media Partners, LLC	Top 40 (CHR)
WFEL-LP	99.9 FM	Antioch	Faith Evangelical Lutheran Church	Full service
WFEN	88.3 FM	Rockford	Faith Center	Contemporary Christian
WFIW	1390 AM	Fairfield	The Original Company, Inc.	News Talk/Sports
WFIW-FM	104.9 FM	Fairfield	The Original Company, Inc.	Adult hits
WFMB	1450 AM	Springfield	Neuhoff Media Springfield, LLC	Sports (ESPN)
WFMB-FM	104.5 FM	Springfield	Neuhoff Media Springfield, LLC	Country
WFMT	98.7 FM	Chicago	Window to the World Communications	Classical
WFPS	92.1 FM	Freeport	Big Radio	Country
WFRL	1570 AM	Freeport	Big Radio	Oldies
WFRX	1300 AM	West Frankfort	Withers Broadcasting of Southern Illinois, LLC	Sports (FSR)
WFXN	1230 AM	Moline	iHM Licenses, LLC	Sports (FSR)
WFYR	97.3 FM	Elmwood	Radio License Holding CBC, LLC	Country
WGBK	88.5 FM	Glenview	Glenbrook High School District	Indie/College Music, News, Sports
WGCA	88.5 FM	Quincy	Great Commission Broadcasting Corporation	Christian
WGCI-FM	107.5 FM	Chicago	iHM Licenses, LLC	Urban
WGCY	106.3 FM	Gibson City	F & G Broadcasting, Inc.	Beautiful music
WGEL	101.7 FM	Greenville	Bond Broadcasting Inc.	Country
WGEM-FM	105.1 FM	Quincy	Gray Television Licensee, LLC	Sports (ESPN)
WGEN-FM	88.9 FM	Monee	Wild World Media, Inc.	Eclectic music/Talk
WGFA-FM	94.1 FM	Watseka	Iroquois County Broadcasting Company	Adult contemporary
WGFB	103.1 FM	Rockton	Long Nine, Inc.	Adult contemporary
WGGH	1150 AM	Marion	Fishback Media, Inc.	News/Talk
WGIL	1400 AM	Galesburg	Galesburg Broadcasting Company	News/Talk
WGKC	105.9 FM	Mahomet	S.J. Broadcasting, LLC	Country
WGLC-FM	100.1 FM	Mendota	Shaw Local Radio Co.	Country
WGLO	95.5 FM	Pekin	Radio License Holding CBC, LLC	Classic rock
WGLT	89.1 FM	Normal	Illinois State University	News/Jazz/Blues
WGMR	91.3 FM	Effingham	Covenant Network	Catholic
WGN	720 AM	Chicago	Tribune Media Company	News/Talk
WGNJ	89.3 FM	St. Joseph	Good News Radio, Inc.	Christian
WGNN	102.5 FM	Fisher	Good News Radio, Inc.	Christian
WGNX	96.7 FM	Colchester	Patricia Van Zandt	Religious
WGRB	1390 AM	Chicago	iHM Licenses, LLC	Gospel
WGRG-LP	100.5 FM	Geneseo	Geneseo Community Radio Group, Inc.	1980s hits
WGRN	89.5 FM	Greenville	Greenville College Educational Broadcasting Foundation, Inc	Contemporary Christian
WGVD-LP	97.3 FM	Dwight	Dwight First Baptist Church and Academy	Religious Teaching
WGVV-LP	92.5 FM	Rock Island	Quad Cities Community Broadcasting Group	Urban contemporary
WHCM	88.3 FM	Palatine	William Rainey Harper College	College
WHCO	1230 AM	Sparta	Southern Illinois Radio Group, Inc.	Country
WHET	97.7 FM	West Frankfort	Withers Broadcasting of Southern Illinois, LLC	Country
WHFH	88.5 FM	Flossmoor	Community High School District #233	High school broadcasting
WHIW-LP	101.3 FM	Harvard	Harvard Broadcasting, Inc.	Variety
WHJG-LP	93.3 FM	Rockford	Pelley Road Christian Fellowship	Christian talk
WHJR	88.3 FM	Murphysboro	Covenant Network	Catholic
WHMS-FM	97.5 FM	Champaign	Champaign Multimedia Group, LLC	Adult contemporary
WHOW	1520 AM	Clinton	Kaskaskia Broadcasting, Inc.	News/Talk
WHPA	89.7 FM	Macomb	Good News Radio, Inc.	Christian
WHPI	96.5 FM	Farmington	Advanced Media Partners, LLC	Adult hits
WHPK	88.5 FM	Chicago	University of Chicago	College
WHPO	100.9 FM	Hoopeston	Hoopeston Radio, Inc.	Country
WHQQ	98.9 FM	Neoga	The Cromwell Group, Inc. of Illinois	Sports (ESPN)
WHRD	106.9 FM	Freeport	Northwestern Illinois Radio Fellowship, Inc.	Christian
WHRU-LP	101.5 FM	Huntley	Huntley Community Radio Ltd. NFP	Variety
WHSD	88.5 FM	Hinsdale	Hinsdale Twsp. High Sch. Dist. #86	High school
WIBH	1440 AM	Anna	WIBH, Inc.	Country
WIBI	91.1 FM	Carlinville	University of Northwestern – St. Paul	Contemporary Christian
WIBK	1360 AM	Watseka	Iroquois County Broadcasting Company	News/Talk
WIBL	107.7 FM	Fairbury	Pilot Media, LLC	Country
WIBV	102.1 FM	Mount Vernon	Benjamin Stratemeyer	Country
WIHM	1410 AM	Taylorville	Covenant Network	Religious
WIHM-FM	88.1 FM	Harrisburg	Covenant Network	Catholic
WIHN	96.7 FM	Normal	Neuhoff Media Bloomington, LLC	Active rock
WIIT	88.9 FM	Chicago	Illinois Institute of Technology	Variety
WIJR	880 AM	Highland	Birach Broadcasting Corporation	Regional Mexican
WIKC	96.7 FM	Virden	Educational Media Foundation	Contemporary Christian (K-Love)
WIKK	103.5 FM	Newton	V.L.N. Broadcasting, Inc.	Classic rock
WILL	580 AM	Urbana	The Board of Trustees of the University of Illinois	News/Talk; Public radio
WILL-FM	90.9 FM	Urbana	The Board of Trustees of the University of Illinois	Classical; Public radio
WILP	98.1 FM	Cuba	Spoon River Media, LLC	
WILV	91.1 FM	Loves Park	Educational Media Foundation	Contemporary Christian (K-Love)
WILY	1210 AM	Centralia	WRXX, LLC	Silent
WIMB	89.1 FM	Murphysboro	University of Northwestern – St. Paul	Contemporary Christian
WIND	560 AM	Chicago	Salem Media of Illinois, LLC	News/Talk
WINI	1420 AM	Murphysboro	Southern Illinois Radio Group, Inc.	Oldies
WIPA	89.3 FM	Pittsfield	The Board of Trustees of the University of Illinois	Public radio
WIQI	95.9 FM	Watseka	Smash Hit Media, Inc.	Classic rock
WIRL	1290 AM	Peoria	Midwest Communications, Inc.	Conservative talk
WISH-FM	98.9 FM	Galatia	WISH Radio, LLC	Adult contemporary
WITM	88.7 FM	West Frankfort	Three Angels Broadcasting Network, Inc.	Religious
WITY	980 AM	Danville	Randy Richmond Services LLC	Adult hits/Farm
WIUM	91.3 FM	Macomb	Western Illinois University	Public broadcasting
WIUS	88.3 FM	Macomb	Western Illinois University	College
WIUW	89.5 FM	Warsaw	Western Illinois University	Public broadcasting
WIVQ	103.3 FM	Spring Valley	Shaw Local Radio Co.	Top 40 (CHR)
WIXN	1460 AM	Dixon	NRG License Sub, LLC	Oldies
WIXO	105.7 FM	Peoria	Radio License Holding CBC, LLC	Active rock
WIXY	100.3 FM	Champaign	Saga Communications of Illinois, LLC	Country
WJAF-LP	103.7 FM	Centralia	Day Star Christian Broadcasting	Religious
WJBC	1230 AM	Bloomington	Cumulus Licensing LLC	News/Talk
WJBD-FM	100.1 FM	Salem	NRG License Sub, LLC	Full service
WJBM	1480 AM	Jerseyville	GBI Communications, LLC	News/Talk
WJCH	91.9 FM	Joliet	Family Stations, Inc.	Religious
WJCZ	91.3 FM	Milford	Calvary Radio Network, Inc.	Christian (Calvary Radio Network)
WJDK-FM	95.7 FM	Seneca	Grundy County Broadcasters, Inc	Country
WJEK	95.3 FM	Rantoul	S.J. Broadcasting, LLC	Contemporary Christian
WJEQ	102.7 FM	Macomb	Virden Broadcasting Corp.	Classic rock
WJEZ	98.9 FM	Dwight	Cumulus Licensing LLC	Classic hits
WJHV-LP	95.1 FM	Fairbury	Faith Fellowship Ministries, Inc.	Religious
WJIL	1550 AM	Jacksonville	Morgan County Media LLC	News/Talk
WJKG	105.5 FM	Altamont	The Cromwell Group, Inc. of Illinois	Adult hits
WJLI	98.3 FM	Metropolis	Sun Media, Inc.	Classic rock
WJLY	88.3 FM	Ramsey	Countryside Broadcasting	Christian
WJMU	89.5 FM	Decatur	Millikin University	Alternative
WJOL	1340 AM	Joliet	Alpha Media Licensee LLC	News/Talk
WJPF	1340 AM	Herrin	MRR License LLC	News/Talk
WJRE	102.5 FM	Galva	Virden Broadcasting Corp.	Country
WJVO	105.5 FM	South Jacksonville	Morgan County Media LLC	Country
WJWR	90.3 FM	Bloomington	Good News Radio, Inc.	Christian
WKAI	100.1 FM	Macomb	Virden Broadcasting Corp.	Top 40 (CHR)
WKAN	1320 AM	Kankakee	Staradio	Talk/Personality
WKAY	105.3 FM	Knoxville	Galesburg Broadcasting Company	Adult contemporary
WKBM	930 AM	Sandwich	Relevant Radio, Inc.	Catholic
WKEI	1450 AM	Kewanee	Virden Broadcasting Corp.	News/Talk
WKGL-FM	96.7 FM	Loves Park	Townsquare License, LLC	Classic rock
WKIB	96.5 FM	Anna	WKIB, LLC	Pop contemporary hit radio
WKIO	105.5 FM	Monticello	Neuhoff Media Decatur, LLC	Classic rock
WKJR	1460 AM	Rantoul	Ruben's Productions, Inc.	Spanish variety
WKJT	102.3 FM	Teutopolis	Premier Broadcasting Inc.	Country
WKKC	89.3 FM	Chicago	Board of Trustees Community College Dist.	Urban contemporary
WKQX	101.1 FM	Chicago	Radio License Holdings LLC	Alternative rock
WKRO	1490 AM	Cairo	Benjamin Stratemeyer	Urban adult contemporary
WKRS	1220 AM	Waukegan	Alpha Media Licensee LLC	Spanish sports
WKRV	107.1 FM	Vandalia	The Cromwell Group, Inc. of Illinois	Classic hits
WKSC-FM	103.5 FM	Chicago	iHM Licenses, LLC	Top 40 (CHR)
WKTA	1330 AM	Evanston	Polnet Communications, Ltd.	Spanish tropical
WKXQ	92.5 FM	Rushville	LB Sports Productions LLC	Adult standards
WKYX-FM	94.3 FM	Golconda	Bristol Broadcasting Company, Inc.	News/Talk
WKZF	102.3 FM	Morton	Midwest Communications, Inc.	Rhythmic classic hits
WKZI	800 AM	Casey	American Hope Communications, Inc.	Christian
WLBK	1360 AM	DeKalb	DeKalb County Broadcasters, Inc.	News/Talk/Adult contemporary
WLBM-LP	105.7 FM	Danville	Blues & Soul Inc.	R&B/Blues/Jazz/Gospel
WLCA	89.9 FM	Godfrey	Lewis & Clark Community College	Alternative rock/College
WLCN	96.3 FM	Atlanta	KM Radio of Atlanta, L.L.C.	Country
WLDS	1180 AM	Jacksonville	Jacksonville Area Radio Broadcasters, Inc.	Soft adult contemporary
WLEY-FM	107.9 FM	Aurora	Wley Licensing, Inc.	Regional Mexican
WLFZ	101.9 FM	Springfield	Saga Communications of Illinois, LLC	Country
WLGS-LP	101.5 FM	Lake Villa	Calvary Chapel of Lake Villa	Contemporary Christian
WLHF-LP	95.7 FM	Champaign	Trinity Educational Association	Catholic
WLHW	91.5 FM	Casey	American Hope Communications, Inc.	Christian
WLIQ	1530 AM	Quincy	Townsquare License, LLC	Classic country
WLIT-FM	93.9 FM	Chicago	iHM Licenses, LLC	Soft adult contemporary
WLKL	89.9 FM	Mattoon	Community College District #517	Alternative rock
WLKU	98.9 FM	Rock Island	Educational Media Foundation	Christian Contemporary (K-Love)
WLLM	1370 AM	Lincoln	Good News Radio, Inc.	Christian
WLLM-FM	90.1 FM	Carlinville	Good News Radio, Inc.	Christian
WLLT	94.3 FM	Polo	Sauk Valley Broadcasting Company	Oldies
WLLU-LP	107.9 FM	Decatur	Love Life Community Radio	Variety
WLMD	104.7 FM	Bushnell	Virden Broadcasting Corp.	News/Talk
WLNX	88.9 FM	Lincoln	Lincoln University	Alternative
WLPL-LP	104.3 FM	Dixon	Turning Point Community Church	Religious talk
WLPN-LP	105.5 FM	Chicago	Public Media Institute	Variety
WLPO	1220 AM	Lasalle	Starved Rock Media, Inc.	News/Talk
WLRA	88.1 FM	Lockport	Lewis University	Variety
WLRW	94.5 FM	Champaign	Saga Communications of Illinois, LLC	Hot adult contemporary
WLS	890 AM	Chicago	Radio License Holdings LLC	Talk
WLS-FM	94.7 FM	Chicago	Radio License Holdings LLC	Classic hits
WLSB	98.5 FM	Augusta	Lifestyle Education Academy International, Inc.	Christian
WLSE	103.3 FM	Canton	Lifestyle Education Academy International, Inc.	Christian
WLSR	92.7 FM	Galesburg	Galesburg Broadcasting Company	Alternative rock
WLTL	88.1 FM	La Grange	Lyons Township High School	Variety rock
WLTM	90.3 FM	Harrisburg	Madisonville Baptist Temple	Christian
WLUJ	89.7 FM	Springfield	Good News Radio, Inc.	Christian talk and music
WLUV	1520 AM	Loves Park	VCY America, Inc.	Conservative Christian
WLUW	88.7 FM	Chicago	Loyola University of Chicago	Alternative rock
WLWF	96.5 FM	Marseilles	Starved Rock Media, Inc.	Country
WLWJ	88.1 FM	Petersburg	Good News Radio, Inc.	Christian
WLWX	88.1 FM	Wheaton	Educational Media Foundation	Christian hits (K-Love Eras)
WMAY	970 AM	Springfield	Long Nine, Inc.	Classic hits
WMAY-FM	92.7 FM	Taylorville	Long Nine, Inc.	News/Talk
WMBD	1470 AM	Peoria	Midwest Communications, Inc.	News/Talk
WMBI-FM	90.1 FM	Chicago	The Moody Bible Institute of Chicago	Religious
WMCI	101.3 FM	Mattoon	The Cromwell Group, Inc. of Illinois	Country
WMCL	1060 AM	McLeansboro	Dana Communications Corporation	Country
WMFN	640 AM	Peotone	Birach Broadcasting Corporation	Stunting
WMIX	940 AM	Mount Vernon	Withers Broadcasting Company of Illinois, LLC	News/Talk & Adult standards
WMIX-FM	94.1 FM	Mount Vernon	Withers Broadcasting Company of Illinois, LLC	Country
WMKB	102.9 FM	Earlville	KM Radio of Earlville, L.L.C.	Regional Mexican
WMKR	94.3 FM	Pana	Miller Communications, Inc.	Country
WMMC	105.9 FM	Marshall	JKO Media Group, LLC	Classic hits
WMOI	97.7 FM	Monmouth	Robbins-Treat Resources, LLC	Adult contemporary
WMOK	920 AM	Metropolis	Withers Broadcasting Company of Paducah, LLC	Country
WMQZ	104.1 FM	Colchester	Virden Broadcasting Corp.	Classic hip hop
WMSH	90.3 FM	Sparta	Covenant Network	Catholic
WMTH	90.5 FM	Park Ridge	Board of Education, Maine Twp. #207	High school
WMVP	1000 AM	Chicago	Good Karma Broadcasting, L.L.C.	Sports (ESPN)
WMXM	88.9 FM	Lake Forest	Lake Forest College	College
WNIE	89.1 FM	Freeport	Northern Illinois University	Public radio (News/Talk, AAA)
WNIJ	89.5 FM	DeKalb	Northern Illinois University	Public radio (News/Talk, AAA)
WNIQ	91.5 FM	Sterling	Northern Illinois University	Public radio (News/Talk, AAA)
WNIU	90.5 FM	Rockford	Northern Illinois University	Classical
WNIW	91.3 FM	La Salle	Northern Illinois University	Public radio (News/Talk, AAA)
WNLD	88.1 FM	Decatur	University of Northwestern – St. Paul	Contemporary Christian
WNLF	95.9 FM	Macomb	Virden Broadcasting Corp.	Country
WNNS	98.7 FM	Springfield	Long Nine, Inc.	Adult contemporary
WNOI	103.9 FM	Flora	H & R Communications, Inc.	Adult contemporary
WNSV	104.7 FM	Nashville	Dana Communications, Inc.	Classic hits
WNTA	1330 AM	Rockford	Long Nine, Inc.	Regional Mexican
WNTH	88.1 FM	Winnetka	Board of Education, New Trier Township District 203	Variety
WNUR-FM	89.3 FM	Evanston	Northwestern University	Variety
WNVR	1030 AM	Vernon Hills	Polnet Communications, Ltd.	Polish
WNWI	1080 AM	Oak Lawn	Birach Broadcasting Corporation	Ethnic
WOAM	1350 AM	Peoria	American Education Foundation, Inc.	Urban ads;t contemporary
WOJO	105.1 FM	Evanston	Tichenor License Corporation	Regional Mexican
WOKL	89.1 FM	Round Lake Beach	Educational Media Foundation	Contemporary Christian (K-Love)
WOKZ	105.9 FM	Fairfield	The Original Company, Inc.	Country
WOLG	95.9 FM	Carlinville	Covenant Network	Catholic
WONC	89.1 FM	Naperville	North Central College	Album-oriented rock
WONU	89.7 FM	Kankakee	Olivet Nazarene University	Contemporary Christian
WOOZ-FM	99.9 FM	Harrisburg	MRR License LLC	Country
WOWA	93.7 FM	West Salem	V.L.N. Broadcasting, Inc.	Classic hits
WPBG	93.3 FM	Peoria	Midwest Communications, Inc.	Classic hits
WPCD	88.7 FM	Champaign	Parkland College	Alternative
WPEO	1020 AM	Peoria	WPEO Radio Foundation	Christian radio
WPEO-FM	98.3 FM	Farmer City	WPEO Radio Foundation	Christian
WPFS-LP	105.9 FM	Monmouth	Monmouth College	Variety
WPGU	107.1 FM	Urbana	Illini Media Company	Alternative
WPIA	98.5 FM	Eureka	Advanced Media Partners, LLC	Top 40 (CHR)
WPJC	88.3 FM	Pontiac	2820 Communications, Incorporated	Catholic
WPJX	1500 AM	Zion	Polnet Communications, Ltd.	Heavy metal
WPMB	1500 AM	Vandalia	The Cromwell Group, Inc. of Illinois	Adult contemporary
WPMJ	94.3 FM	Chillicothe	Covenant Network	Catholic
WPNA-FM	103.1 FM	Niles	Alliance Radio, LLC	Polish
WPNV-LP	106.3 FM	Peoria	Black Business Alliance Peoria Chapter	Urban adult contemporary
WPOK	93.7 FM	Pontiac	Casson Media, LLC	Classic hits
WPPN	106.7 FM	Des Plaines	Univision Radio Illinois, Inc.	Spanish adult contemporary
WPRC	88.7 FM	Sheffield	University of Northwestern – St. Paul	Christian adult contemporary
WPTH	88.1 FM	Olney	VCY America, Inc.	Conservative Christian
WPWQ	106.7 FM	Mount Sterling	LB Sports Productions LLC	Oldies
WPXN	104.9 FM	Paxton	Paxton Broadcasting Corporation	Adult contemporary
WPZA	107.9	Canton	Educational Media Foundation	Contemporary Christian
WQCY	103.9 FM	Quincy	Staradio Corporation	Adult contemporary
WQEG-LP	98.3 FM	Chicago	Sound of Hope Radio NFP	Chinese Conservative talk/Classical Music
WQFL	100.9 FM	Rockford	Educational Media Foundation	Worship music (Air1)
WQIN-LP	102.9 FM	Quincy	3 Angels Broadcasting Messengers	Christian
WQJC-LP	107.9 FM	Quincy	Quincy Not for Profit Jazz Corporation	Jazz
WQJT-LP	105.7 FM	Freeport	Flight Radio Studio Production Company Inc.	Variety
WQKQ	92.1 FM	Dallas City	Pritchard Broadcasting Corporation	Classic rock
WQLF	102.1 FM	Lena	Big Radio	Classic rock
WQLZ	97.7 FM	Petersburg	Long Nine, Inc.	Active rock
WQQB	96.1 FM	Rantoul	S.J. Broadcasting, LLC	Top 40 (CHR)
WQRL	106.3 FM	Benton	Dana Communications Corporation	Oldies
WQUB	90.3 FM	Quincy	The Curators of the University of Missouri	Public radio
WQUD	107.7 FM	Erie	JMRW, LLC	Classic hits/Country
WRAM	1330 AM	Monmouth	Robbins-Treat Resources, LLC	Classic country
WRAN	97.3 FM	Taylorville	Miller Communications, Inc.	Oldies
WRCV	101.7 FM	Dixon	NRG License Sub, LLC	Country
WRDZ	1300 AM	La Grange	Polnet Communications, Ltd.	Polish
WREE	92.5 FM	Urbana	Saga Communications of Illinois, LLC	Classic hits
WREZ	105.5 FM	Metropolis	Withers Broadcasting Company of Paducah, LLC	Top 40 (CHR)
WRFU-LP	104.5 FM	Urbana	Urbana-Champaign Independent Media Center Foundation	Variety
WRHK	94.9 FM	Danville	Neuhoff Media Danville, LLC	Classic rock
WRHL	1060 AM	Rochelle	Rochelle Broadcasting Co., Inc.	Classic hits
WRIK	750 AM	Brookport	Daniel S. Stratemeyer	Country
WRKX	95.3 FM	Ottawa	NRG License Sub, LLC	Classic rock
WRLJ	88.3 FM	White Hall	Good News Radio, Inc.	Christian
WRLL	1450 AM	Cicero	Midway Broadcasting Corporation	Latin music & Talk
WRLR-LP	98.3 FM	Round Lake Heights	Rondaradio	Eclectic
WRME-LD	87.7 FM	Chicago	WLFM, LLC	Soft Adult Contemporary/Oldies
WRMJ	102.3 FM	Aledo	WRMJ LLC	Country
WRMN	1410 AM	Elgin	Elgin Community Broadcasting LLC	News/Talk
WRMS	790 AM	Beardstown	Covenant Network	Catholic
WRMS-FM	94.3 FM	Beardstown	LB Sports Productions LLC	Country
WROK	1440 AM	Rockford	Townsquare License, LLC	News/Talk
WROY	1460 AM	Carmi	The Original Company, Inc.	Oldies
WRPW	92.9 FM	Colfax	Pilot Media, LLC	Talk
WRRG	88.9 FM	River Grove	Triton College	Indie/Progressive rock
WRTB	95.3 FM	Winnebago	Long Nine, Inc.	Country
WRTE	90.7 FM	Chicago	Chicago Public Media	Public radio, Jazz
WRTK	90.5 FM	Paxton	Hyles-Anderson College	Christian
WRTO	1200 AM	Chicago	Latino Media Network, LLC	Spanish News/Talk
WRUL	97.3 FM	Carmi	The Original Company, Inc.	Country
WRVY-FM	100.5 FM	Henry	Virden Broadcasting Corp.	Country
WRWO-LP	94.5 FM	Ottawa	Here and Again	Variety
WRXQ	100.7 FM	Coal City	Walnut Radio Illinois, LLC	Classic rock
WRXX	95.3 FM	Centralia	WRXX, LLC	Hot adult contemporary
WRYT	1080 AM	Edwardsville	Covenant Network	Catholic
WSBC	1240 AM	Chicago	WSBC LLC	Ethnic
WSCR	670 AM	Chicago	Audacy License, LLC	Sports (ISN)
WSCT	90.5 FM	Springfield	University of Northwestern – St. Paul	Religious
WSDR	1240 AM	Sterling	Virden Broadcasting Corp.	News/Talk
WSDZ	1260 AM	Belleville	Relevant Radio, Inc.	Catholic
WSEI	92.9 FM	Olney	V.L.N. Broadcasting, Inc.	Country
WSFI	88.5 FM	Antioch	BVM Helping Hands	Catholic talk
WSFS	950 AM	Chicago	Relevant Radio, Inc.	Catholic
WSFV	88.7 FM	Indian Creek	BVM Helping Hands	Catholic talk
WSIE	88.7 FM	Edwardsville	Board of Trustees Southern Illinois University	Jazz
WSIQ	1350 AM	Salem	NRG License Sub, LLC	Country
WSIU	91.9 FM	Carbondale	Board of Trustees of Southern Illinois University	News/Talk, Classical
WSJK	93.5 FM	Tuscola	S.J. Broadcasting, LLC	Sports (ESPN)
WSLE	91.3 FM	Salem	American Family Association	Religious talk (AFR)
WSMI	1540 AM	Litchfield	Talley Broadcasting Corporation	Classic country
WSMI-FM	106.1 FM	Litchfield	Talley Broadcasting Corporation	Country
WSOG	88.1 FM	Spring Valley	Spirit Education Association, Inc.	Catholic
WSOY	1340 AM	Decatur	Neuhoff Media Decatur, LLC	News/Talk
WSOY-FM	102.9 FM	Decatur	Neuhoff Media Decatur, LLC	Top 40 (CHR)
WSPI	89.5 FM	Ellsworth	2820 Communications Incorporated	Catholic
WSPL	1250 AM	Streator	Shaw Local Radio Co.	News/Talk
WSPY-FM	107.1 FM	Plano	Nelson Enterprises, Inc.	Adult contemporary
WSQR	1180 AM	Sycamore	DeKalb County Broadcasters, Inc.	Classic hits
WSRB	106.3 FM	Lansing	Dontron, Inc.	Urban adult contemporary
WSRI	88.7 FM	Sugar Grove	Educational Media Foundation	Worship music (Air1)
WSSQ	105.5 FM	Sterling	Virden Broadcasting Corp.	Adult contemporary
WSSR	96.7 FM	Joliet	Alpha Media Licensee LLC	Adult hits
WSTQ	97.7 FM	Streator	Shaw Local Radio Co.	Top 40 (CHR)
WSVZ	98.3 FM	Tower Hill	Miller Communications, Inc.	Country
WSWS	89.9 FM	Smithboro	The Power Foundation	Southern gospel (The Life FM)
WSWT	106.9 FM	Peoria	Midwest Communications, Inc.	Adult contemporary
WTAD	930 AM	Quincy	Staradio Corporation	News/Talk
WTAO-FM	105.1 FM	Murphysboro	Withers Broadcasting of Southern Illinois, LLC	Active rock
WTAX	1240 AM	Springfield	Saga Communications of Illinois, LLC	News/Talk
WTAX-FM	93.9 FM	Sherman	Saga Communications of Illinois, LLC	News/Talk
WTAY	1570 AM	Robinson	The Original Company, Inc.	News/Talk/Sports
WTBC-FM	100.3 FM	Chicago	Chicago FCC License Sub, LLC	Rhythmic adult hits
WTGT-LP	100.9 FM	Donnellson	Rose of Sharon Broadcasting Association	Silent
WTIM	870 AM	Assumption	Miller Communications, Inc.	News/Talk
WTMX	101.9 FM	Skokie	Chicago FCC License Sub, LLC	Hot adult contemporary
WTND-LP	106.3 FM	Macomb	T And D Communications	Community radio
WTPB-LP	99.3 FM	Rockford	Third Presbyterian Church of Rockford	Religious/Easy listening
WTRH	93.3 FM	Ramsey	Countryside Broadcasting, Inc.	News/Talk
WTTT	88.3 FM	Springfield	Covenant Network	Catholic
WTYE	101.7 FM	Robinson	The Original Company, Inc.	Classic hits
WTZI	88.1 FM	Rosemont	RadioEd	Ethnic
WTZY	91.3 FM	Wonder Lake	Calvary Radio Network, Inc.	Christian (Calvary Radio Network)
WUEZ	95.1 FM	Carterville	MRR License LLC	Adult hits
WUIS	91.9 FM	Springfield	Board of Trustees of the University of Illinois	Public radio
WUON	89.3 FM	Morris	2820 Communications Incorporated	Christian Contemporary
WURX	95.7 FM	Oregon	NRG License Sub, LLC	Classic rock
WUSI	90.3 FM	Olney	Board of Trustees of Southern Illinois University	News/Talk
WUSN	99.5 FM	Chicago	Audacy License, LLC	Country
WVAZ	102.7 FM	Oak Park	iHM Licenses, LLC	Urban adult contemporary
WVEL	1140 AM	Pekin	Radio License Holding CBC, LLC	Urban gospel
WVIK	90.3 FM	Rock Island	Augustana College	Public radio
WVIL	101.3 FM	Virginia	LB Sports Productions LLC	Sports (FSR)
WVIV-FM	93.5 FM	Lemont	Univision Radio Illinois, Inc.	Spanish urban
WVJC	89.1 FM	Mount Carmel	Illinois Eastern Community Colleges	Alternative
WVKC	90.7 FM	Galesburg	Knox College	Alternative
WVLI	92.7 FM	Kankakee	Milner Media Partners, LLC	Classic hits
WVLN	740 AM	Olney	V.L.N. Broadcasting, Inc.	Sports (ISN)
WVNL	91.7 FM	Vandalia	University of Northwestern – St. Paul	Contemporary Christian
WVON	1690 AM	Berwyn	iHM Licenses, LLC	Urban talk
WVSI	88.9 FM	Mt. Vernon	Board of Trustees of Southern Illinois University	News/Talk
WVYN	90.9 FM	Bluford	Pure Word Radio, Inc.	Contemporary Christian
WVZA	92.7 FM	Herrin	Withers Broadcasting of Southern Illinois, LLC	Alternative rock
WWAD	88.5 FM	Carol Stream	Adelante Community Health Center	Christian talk
WWCT	99.9 FM	Bartonville	Advanced Media Partners, LLC	Alternative rock
WWDV	96.9 FM	Zion	Chicago FCC License Sub, LLC	Classic rock
WWGN	88.9 FM	Ottawa	Family Worship Center Church, Inc.	Religious
WWGO	92.1 FM	Charleston	The Cromwell Group, Inc. of Illinois	Classic rock
WWHN	1510 AM	Joliet	Hawkins Broadcasting Company	Urban adult contemporary
WWHX	100.7 FM	Normal	Neuhoff Media Bloomington, LLC	Hot adult contemporary
WWKJ-LP	102.9 FM	Peoria	Peoria Christian Radio Corporation	Religious Teaching
WWQC	107.3 FM	Clifton	The Power Foundation	Southern gospel (The Life FM)
WWTG	88.1 FM	Carpentersville	Cary Grove Adventist Fellowship	Christian
WWVR	98.5 FM	Paris	Midwest Communications, Inc.	Classic rock
WXAN	103.9 FM	Ava	Mountain Valley Media LLC	Southern gospel
WXAV	88.3 FM	Chicago	St. Xavier College	Indie rock
WXCL	104.9 FM	Pekin	Midwest Communications, Inc.	Country
WXEC-LP	103.1 FM	Eureka	Eureka College	Alternative
WXEF	97.9 FM	Effingham	Premier Broadcasting, Inc.	Classic hits
WXES	1110 AM	Chicago	El Sembrador Ministries	Spanish Catholic
WXFM-FM	99.3 FM	Mount Zion	Educational Media Foundation	Christian adult contemporary (K-Love)
WXLC	102.3 FM	Waukegan	Alpha Media Licensee LLC	Country
WXLP	96.9 FM	Moline	Townsquare License, LLC	Classic rock
WXLT	103.5 FM	Christopher	MRR License LLC	Sports (ESPN)
WXMR-LP	94.3 FM	Marengo	Marril Corsen Media Project, Inc.	Variety
WXNU	106.5 FM	St. Anne	Staradio Corporation	Country
WXOS	101.1 FM	East St. Louis	St. Louis FCC License Sub, LLC	Sports (ESPN)
WXRJ-LP	94.9 FM	Bloomington	Black Business Alliance, Inc.	Urban adult contemporary
WXRT	93.1 FM	Chicago	Audacy License, LLC	Adult album alternative
WXRX	104.9 FM	Belvidere	Long Nine, Inc.	Active rock
WXWS-LP	100.1 FM	Bone Gap	Independent Church of Bone Gap	Religious Teaching
WXXQ	98.5 FM	Freeport	Townsquare License, LLC	Country
WYCA	102.3 FM	Crete	Dontron Inc.	Black gospel
WYDS	93.1 FM	Decatur	The Cromwell Group, Inc. of Illinois	Top 40 (CHR)
WYHI	99.9 FM	Park Forest	Bible Broadcasting Network, Inc.	Conservative religious
WYKT	105.5 FM	Wilmington	Staradio Corporation	Sports (FSR)
WYLL	1160 AM	Chicago	Salem Media Group, LLC	Christian talk
WYMG	100.5 FM	Jacksonville	Saga Communications of Illinois, LLC	Classic rock
WYML-LP	99.9 FM	Ingleside	Local Community Broadcasting Inc	Variety
WYNG	94.9 FM	Mount Carmel	Educational Media Foundation	Contemporary Christian (K-Love)
WYOT	102.3 FM	Rochelle	Rochelle Broadcasting Co., Inc.	Country
WYRB	106.3 FM	Genoa	Dontron, Inc.	Rhythmic contemporary
WYUR	103.7 FM	Gilman	Milner Media Partners, LLC	Classic rock
WYWL	88.9 FM	Harvard	2820 Communications INC	Catholic
WYXY	99.1 FM	Savoy	Saga Communications of Illinois, LLC	Classic country
WYYS	106.1 FM	Streator	Shaw Local Radio Co.	Classic hits
WZGL	88.1 FM	Charleston	University of Northwestern – St. Paul	Religious
WZIE	106.1 FM	Abingdon	Galesburg Broadcasting Company	Classic hits
WZIM	99.5 FM	Lexington	Pilot Media, LLC	Adult contemporary
WZIV	90.7 FM	Princeton	Road Map Ministries	Contemporary Christian
WZJM-LP	99.9 FM	Freeburg	M&M Community Development Inc., E. St. Louis Branch	Urban
WZKL	91.7 FM	Woodstock	Educational Media Foundation	Contemporary Christian (K-Love)
WZND-LP	103.3 FM	Bloomington	Illinois State University Foundation	Christian CHR
WZNX	106.7 FM	Sullivan	The Cromwell Group, Inc. of Illinois	Mainstream rock
WZOE	1490 AM	Princeton	Virden Broadcasting Corp.	News/Talk
WZOE-FM	98.1 FM	Princeton	Virden Broadcasting Corp.	Classic hip hop
WZOK	97.5 FM	Rockford	Townsquare License, LLC	Top 40 (CHR)
WZPN	101.1 FM	Glasford	Advanced Media Partners, LLC	Sports (FSR)
WZPW	92.3 FM	Peoria	Radio License Holding CBC, LLC	Rhythmic contemporary
WZQC-LP	99.1 FM	Cicero	Morton College	Variety
WZRD	88.3 FM	Chicago	Northeastern Illinois University	Freeform
WZSR	105.5 FM	Woodstock	Alpha Media Licensee LLC	Hot adult contemporary
WZUS	100.9 FM	Macon	The Cromwell Group, Inc. of Illinois	News/Talk
WZZT	102.7 FM	Morrison	Virden Broadcasting Corp.	Country

== Defunct ==
- WEAD
- WAMV
- WCEV
- WCHI
- WCLM
- WENR
- WGEM
- WGHC-LP
- WIBU
- WJAZ
- WMBB-WOK
- WRSE
