= Shaw Media (United States) =

American newspaper publisher, founded 1851

- Status: Active
- Predecessor: The Dixon Telegraph
- Founded: 1851; 175 years ago
- Founder: Benjamin Flower Shaw
- Headquarters location: 7717 South Illinois Route 31, Crystal Lake, IL 60014.
- Owner: Mabel S. Shaw Family Trust
- Official website: www.shawmedia.com

Shaw Family Holdings, Inc., doing business as Shaw Media, is a newspaper publisher based in Crystal Lake, Illinois, a suburb of Chicago, and wholly owned by the Mabel S. Shaw Family Trust. Its portfolio includes about 80 newspapers and news websites in Illinois and Iowa. Originally based in Dixon, Illinois; it has acquired a swath of properties in the Chicago suburbs and moved its headquarters there. Founded in 1851, Shaw Media is the third oldest, continuously owned and operated family newspaper company in the United States.

== History ==
Benjamin Flower Shaw was born on a farm in Waverly, New York on March 31, 1831. His parents died when he was in his early teens. At age 14, he worked delivering mail on horseback from Cedar Rapids, Iowa to Galena, Illinois. The route was a distance of 100 miles. At age 16, Shaw worked at a printing plant in Rock Island where he learned the printer's trade. At age 20, he came to Dixon, Illinois to visit his siblings and then found work at the local newspaper. The first issue of the Dixon Telegraph and Lee County Herald was published on May 1, 1851. It was founded Charles R. Fisk, a retired Presbyterian minister who brought a Washington hand press and other printing equipment with him as his family traveled by carriage to come settle in Dixon. It was the area's first newspaper. About six months later Fisk sold the paper to J. F. Hooper and M. P. Bull, who shortened the name on Dec. 3, 1851. Hopper dropped out before the end of the year and Shaw joined the firm two weeks before Bull sold out to J. V. Eustace, who became editor and proprietor.

Shaw became the paper's publisher on January 21, 1852, and then the sole proprietor on April 30, 1854. Shaw briefly traveled west to make his riches in the Pike's Peak gold rush. He found no gold and to support himself worked as a compositor. He set type on the first issue of the Rocky Mountain News. According to Shaw, the owner offered the newspaper to him in exchange for Shaw's team of mules. But Shaw declined, needing them to make the return journey home. He left Colorado after four months. Upon returning, Shaw took over The Amboy Times for a time and then returned to Dixon to again be the editor and publisher of the Dixon Telegraph. In 1856, Shaw was one of a dozen editors who met in Decatur to help found the Republication Party in Illinois. Abraham Lincoln was at the meeting as the group's legal adviser. Shaw then helped organize the Bloomington Convention and at the event was a member of the resolutions committee. Shaw also went on to cover and report on the Lincoln–Douglas debates. Decades later B. F. Printing Company was incorporated on July 2, 1891. At that time, B. F. Shaw's only son Eustace Shaw became managing editor and publisher. He helped run the business until his sudden death on September 5, 1902. He was 45 years old.

Three years prior Eustace Shaw was wed to Mabel S. Shaw, and the couple had three sons together. Immediately upon his death Mabel S. Shaw came to work at the paper. B. F. Shaw died suddenly on September 18, 1909. After his death, Mabel S. Shaw assumed management of company and served as its president. She was known for her personal attention to detail, business acumen and became known as "The First Lady" of midwestern journalism. In her lifetime the business grew to encompass six daily and one weekly newspaper in Illinois and Iowa, along with the Dixon Publishing company, which was a large commercial printing firm. The company had 500 employees in total. In the 1930s, she incorporated the company and transferred ownership of the company to family trust, with the trustees being her children. Mabel S. Shaw died in 1955. Six decades later, B. F. Shaw's great-great-grandson Tom Shaw in 2011 said: “She was the one that ultimately really had a vision and laid the framework for the company to be here today." The Illinois Press Association in 1994 created the Mabel S. Shaw trophy awarded annual in her honor.

Succeeding their mother was her three sons George B. (died 1962), Robert E. Shaw (died in 1969) and Benjamin T. Shaw (died in 1986). The company remained relatively static after Mabel S. Shaw's death until another period of expansion in the 1980s. In 1981, B. F. Shaw Printing Co. created a subsidy called Shaw Media Group, which managed the Daily Sentinel of Woodstock and its newspapers in McHenry County, Illinois. Two years later Shaw Media Group merged with the Free Press Newspaper Group, owned by Free Press, Inc. The new company was named Shaw / Free Press Media. Over time the family-controlled company moved toward a professional management structure. Due to the Great Recession in the United States, the company consolidated operations and outsourced printing to a third-party. Jobs were eliminated and the total workforce dropped by 15%. In 2010, the company changed its name from Shaw Newspapers to Shaw Media. By 2013, the company owned 35 Illinois newspapers and a handful of publications in Iowa. Around that time a group of minority owners with a 35% ownership stake sued the family members who owned the remaining 65% stake over alleged mismanagement of the company. The lawsuit was settled in 2014 and the minority owners were bought out for $5.25 million.

== Acquisitions ==
Shaw purchased the Newton Daily News in 1944, Creston News Advertiser in 1946, Woodstock Daily Sentinel in 1948; Polo Tri County Press, Mount Morris Times, the Foreston Journal and Carrol County Market Place in 1977; Kane County Chronicle in 1988 and The Daily Gazette of Sterling in 1995 from Thomson Corporation.

In 2005, the company acquired Lakeland Media, publisher of 12 weekly newspapers in Lake County, and reorganized the papers under its subsidy NorthWest News Group. The company purchased the Osceola Sentinel-Tribune in 2006, El Conquistador in 2006 the Daily Chronicle from Lee Enterprises in 2007, and Suburban Life Publications, a group of 22 weekly newspapers in Chicago's western suburbs, from GateHouse Media in 2012.

Shaw Media purchased The Herald-News from Sun-Times Media in 2013; The Fontanelle Observer and Adair County Free Press in 2017, The Ottawa Times from Small Newspaper Group in 2018; and the La Salle NewsTribune and Illinois AgriNews / Indiana AgriNews in 2019.

In 2023, Shaw Media acquired Studstill Media in Peru, Illinois and their eight radio stations (WALS, WBZG, WGLC-FM, WIVQ, WSPL, WSTQ (FM), and WYYS) for $1.8 million. The sale marked Shaw Media's launch into radio and digital media, whereas previously, they exclusively owned newspapers. On April 3, 2023, Shaw Media officially assumed ownership of Studstill Media under the name Shaw Local Radio.

In March 2024, Shaw Media further expanded its radio presence by acquiring NRG Media, which included stations in Dixon, Illinois: WIXN-AM/FM 1460/95.1 (news and information), WRCV-FM 101.7 (River Country 101.7 - Country music), and WSEY-FM 95.7 (Sky 95.7 - Adult contemporary). In October 2024, the company purchased the Daily Journal. In August 2025, Shaw Media purchased four papers from News Media Corporation after the company had ceased operations. The sale included The Rochelle News-Leader, The Mendota Reporter, Ogle County Life and The Amboy News.

In November 2025, Shaw Media sold the News Printing Company, including the Newton Daily News, to J. Louis Mullen. In April 2026, the company acquired three radio stations from STARadio Corporation. The sale included WYKT 105.5 FM, WKAN 1320 AM, and WXNU 106.5 FM. In September 2026, the company acquired The Free Press Newspapers, which included the Braidwood Journal, Coal City Courant and Free Press Advocate.

== Other properties ==
Shaw Media and the Daily Herald announced in spring 2014 the launch of a new Chicago Football magazine led by veteran football analyst Hub Arkush. The magazine subsequently merged with the re-launched Pro Football Weekly.

On December 18, 2020, they launched Shaw Local, a digital news platform covering northern Illinois.
