= WSPL =

Radio station in Streator, Illinois

Streator, Illinois; United States
- Broadcast area: La Salle/Peru
- Frequency: 1250 kHz
- Branding: FM 98.5 WSPL

Programming
- Format: Defunct (was oldies)

Ownership
- Owner: Shaw Media; (Shaw Local Radio Co.)
- Sister stations: WALS, WBZG, WGLC-FM, WIVQ, WSTQ, WYYS

History
- First air date: September 26, 1953 (as WIZZ)
- Last air date: September 1, 2023
- Former call signs: WIZZ (1953–2001)
- Call sign meaning: "Where Streator People Listen"

Technical information
- Licensing authority: FCC
- Facility ID: 63535
- Class: D
- Power: 500 watts day; 64 watts night
- Transmitter coordinates: 41°09′30″N 88°50′13″W
- Translator: 98.5 W253BX (Streator)
- Repeater: 106.1 WYYS-HD2 (Streator)

Links
- Public license information: Public file; LMS
- Webcast: Listen Live
- Website: www.985spl.com/

WSPL (1250 AM) was an American radio station licensed to serve the community of Streator, Illinois. The station is owned by Shaw Media, through licensee Shaw Local Radio Co., after previously being owned by Studstill Media/Mendota Broadcasting, Inc. until April 2023.

The station, established in 1953 as WIZZ, was assigned the call sign WSPL by the Federal Communications Commission (FCC) on January 25, 2001.

Logo before translator sign on

== Programming ==
Station's logo as a news/talk station

WSPL aired an oldies format; it previously broadcast a news/talk radio format. Local programming on WSPL included a morning drive show, and sports with Illinois Hall of Fame Broadcaster "Big Al" Hauessler, along with a tradio show called The Swap Shop. Sports broadcasts included Streator Township High School football and, up until recently, simulcasts of Chicago White Sox baseball and Chicago Bulls basketball.

On January 24, 2023, it was announced that Studstill Media had sold WSPL, along with its sister stations, to Shaw Media in Crystal Lake, Illinois, for a total of $1.8 million. The sale was under FCC review for just under two months before being finalized on March 23, 2023. Shaw Local Radio officially assumed ownership of WSPL and its sister stations on April 3, 2023. WSPL's 1250 AM facility went silent on September 1, 2023; its programming continued on translator station W253BX (98.5 FM) and the second HD Radio channel of WYYS.

== Alumni ==
"Cousin Ed" Nowotarski hosted "Polka Party", a live polka music program, on WSPL for 34 years before retiring from broadcasting in November 2001. Nowotarski died in January 2004.

== License ==
Shaw Local Radio requested the cancellation of WSPL's license on March 6, 2024; the Federal Communications Commission cancelled it on March 8.
