= WGFA =

WGFA may refer to:

- WGFA-FM, a radio station (94.1 FM) licensed to Watseka, Illinois, United States
- WIBK, a radio station (1360 AM) licensed to Watseka, Illinois, which held the call sign WGFA from 1961 to 2017
