= WFIW =

WFIW may refer to:

- World Federation of Industry Workers, a former global union federation
- WFIW (AM), a radio station (1390 AM) licensed to Fairfield, Illinois, United States
- WFIW-FM, a radio station (104.9 FM) licensed to Fairfield, Illinois, United States
