= WJBD =

WJBD may refer to:

- WJBD-FM, a radio station (100.1 FM) licensed to serve Salem, Illinois, United States
- WSIQ, a radio station (1350 AM) licensed to serve Salem, Illinois, which held the call sign WJBD until 2016
