= WSMI =

WSMI may refer to:

- WSMI (AM), a radio station (1540 AM) licensed to Litchfield, Illinois, United States
- WSMI-FM, a radio station (106.1 FM) licensed to Litchfield, Illinois, United States
