= El Conquistador =

Weekly bilingual newspaper in Illinois, United States

- The October 30, 2008 front page of El Conquistador
- Type: Weekly newspaper
- Format: Tabloid
- Owner: Shaw Newspapers
- Editor: Yadira Sanchez Olson
- Founded: 1993
- Ceased publication: 2011
- Language: English and Spanish
- Headquarters: Geneva, Illinois
- Website: www.elconquistadornews.com

El Conquistador was a weekly bilingual newspaper serving McHenry County, Lake County and DeKalb County, Illinois, United States. El Conquistador was published from 1993 to 2011, when it merged with Reflejos.

In addition to single-copy sales, El Conquistador was popular with schools, which used it as a learning aid because all articles were published in both English and Spanish.

El Conquistador was a part of Shaw Suburban Media's NorthWest News Group and was owned by Shaw Newspapers. Shaw Suburban Media includes the Northwest Herald, Kane County Chronicle, DeKalb Daily Chronicle, Lake County Journals, Weekly Journals, The Business Journal, Great Lakes Bulletin, and McHenryCountySports.com.

== History ==
Laura Carrillo Barth, a long-time Elgin resident and two other investors saw the need for an English and Spanish newspaper in the Elgin area. In January 2002, Vision del Fox Valley started covering issues of interest to the Hispanic community in Elgin on a monthly basis. The slogan was "two languages, one voice."

In October 1992, Barth parted ways with her associates and expanded coverage to Aurora with the creation of Vision del Fox Valley - Aurora Edition. Operations moved to Aurora, where Vision shared office space with the Aurora Hispanic Chamber of Commerce.

In February 1993, the newspaper changed its frequency to twice a month, with plans to expand coverage beyond the Fox Valley area. The publication changed its name to El Conquistador, added the Don Quixote logo, and modified its slogan: "El Conquistador, like Don Quixote and his 'impossible dream,' seeks to conquer the barrier between two languages and between two cultures, for all Hispanics by birth and Hispanics at heart, through our articles, stories and photos, reflecting the Hispanic culture, language and, at the same time, serving the community." Circulation expanded to Rockford.

In 1995, El Conquistador moved to its own building in downtown Aurora.

In 1997, circulation was reviewed and an opportunity came to cover the Hispanic community in the growing Joliet market, located in the southwestern Chicago suburbs. The decision was made to eliminate the Rockford market. El Conquistador acquired the Latino Journal, a bilingual publication in the Joliet area. With the addition of this market, audited circulation jumped to 15,000 copies per issue.

The need for more information with shorter periods in between issues prompted the change in circulation from twice a month to weekly. The change took place with the Nov. 2, 2001 issue.

In November 2004, the newspaper underwent a design and content transformation. Sections that appeared occasionally became permanent and the publication size changed from an 11 by 17 to a 10 by 11.7' tabloid to make it more reader-friendly.

On Jan. 21, 2006, El Conquistador was acquired by the NorthWest News Group, a division of Shaw Newspapers, and a new era began, moving operations to the Kane County Chronicle building in Geneva and redesigning the newspaper. Publication size changed again, this time to 9.667 by 11.5. Changes included elimination of Joliet as a coverage area, and circulation was increased throughout McHenry County to better support the NorthWest News Group market.

In June 2006, NorthWest News Group purchased Lo Nuestro, a bilingual Hispanic publication serving DeKalb County. Lo Nuestro news and photos were blended into El Conquistador.

In July 2011, El Conquistador merged with Daily Herald Media Group's Reflejos. The merged paper began publishing under the Reflejos nameplate on August 6, 2011.
