= WOKZ =

WOKZ may refer to:

- WOKZ-CD, a low-power television station (channel 33, virtual 50) licensed to serve Kalamazoo, Michigan, United States
- WOKZ (FM), a radio station (105.9 FM) licensed to serve Fairfield, Illinois, United States
