= Daily Chronicle (Illinois) =

Newspaper

- Type: Daily newspaper
- Format: Print, digital
- Owner(s): Shaw Media
- Founded: 1879
- Headquarters: DeKalb, DeKalb County, Illinois, United States
- Circulation: 19,968
- OCLC number: 27019477
- Website: www.shawlocal.com/daily-chronicle/

The Daily Chronicle is a newspaper which covers DeKalb County in northern Illinois. Its newsroom and press are located in DeKalb, Illinois, a city about 60 miles west of Chicago along Interstate 88.

== History ==
Prior to 1970, the publication ran under the title The DeKalb Daily Chronicle, which began publication in 1909.

The newspaper was formerly owned by Scripps League Newspapers, which was acquired by Pulitzer in 1996; Lee Enterprises acquired Pulitzer in 2005. Shaw Newspapers (now Shaw Media) of Dixon, Illinois, acquired the newspaper in late 2007.

== Circulation ==
The paper has a daily circulation of 19,968 and a Saturday/Sunday "Weekend Edition" circulation of 20,719, as of September 30, 2006.

== Archival access ==
1. LCCN sn92-53420 (The DeKalb Daily Chronicle: 1909–1970)
2. LCCN sn92-53421 (The Daily Chronicle: 1970–current)
3. OCLC 849810401 (blogs; from May 18, 2009, to present via Newsbank at infoweb.newsbank.com)
4. OCLC 27019477 (print)
5. OCLC 942729447 (print)
6. OCLC 10118016 (print)
7. OCLC 45440848 (print; Daily Chronicle. 35 mm microfilm reels, Monmouth, Illinois, Forman Co.)
8. OCLC 45440869 (print; De Kalb Chronicle. 35 mm microfilm reels, Monmouth, Illinois, Forman Co.)
9. OCLC 489053721 (eNewspaper; via – Factiva; December 1992 – July 2001)
10. OCLC 1010519688 (eNewspaper)
11. OCLC 1125678206 (eNewspaper)
12. OCLC 49548802 (eNewspaper)
13. OCLC 1167715459 (eNewspaper)
14. OCLC 956443688 (eNewspaper; via – "Illinois Digital Newspaper Collections" → "De Kalb County))
15. OCLC 1057994364 (ProQuest → 1992 to 1997 → eNewspaper; Proquest Central database)
16. OCLC 958734680 (ProQuest → 1992 to 1997 → eNewspaper; Proquest Central database)
17. OCLC 27019477 (De Kalb Daily Chronicle; 1909–1970)
18. Via Newspapers.com (From January 2, 1970, to present).
19. Via Illinois Digital Newspaper Collections. (thru 1930)

== Bibliography ==
=== References ===
- Cryor, Clark Crawford (1907–1977) (1960). News at Your Doorstep: The Dekalb Daily Chronicle (VHS: 26 minutes → Originally produced as a 16mm film in the 1960s. Transferred to VHS by the DeKalb County Public Library). Story of the local newspaper in DeKalb, Illinois, in the 1960s. Narrated by Veikko Richard "Dick" Hietikko (1920–1992). OCLC 61163763.
1. See Northern Illinois University ArchivesSpace: Clark C. Cryor Audiovisual Collection (RHC-RC-279: Box 4, folder 16).
- Cryor, Clark Crawford (1907–1977) (1963) [DVD: 2005]. A Puppy for Sale (1 videodisc → 27 minutes → 4¾ inch → Originally produced as a 16mm film in 1963). A film showing how the daily newspaper, The DeKalb Daily Chronicle, is published, including the role of the advertising department, editors and reporters, and typesetters, proofreaders, and the presses. OCLC 61669617.
- Lee Enterprises (June 3, 2005). "Lee Completes Pulitzer Acquisition" (press release). Archived from the original on April 22, 2006.
- "Lee Enterprises (official site)" (archived via Wayback Machine). Davenport, Iowa. Archived from the original on November 22, 2011.
- Library of Congress. "About The Dekalb Daily Chronicle (De Kalb, Ill.) 1909–1970". Chronicling America → The DeKalb Daily Chronicle. LCCN sn92-53420
- Northwest Herald. "Shaw Adds DeKalb Papers". Northwest Herald. Vol. 22, no. 339. Crystal Lake, Illinois. pp. 1, 3 (section E) – via Newspapers.com.
- "Shaw Newspapers" → "The Story Inside the Story". 2007. Archived from the original on May 11, 2008.
- Times Wire Services. "Pulitzer to Purchase Scripps Newspapers". Los Angeles Times. ISSN 0458-3035.
1. Blog ed. via Los Angeles Times archives. May 7, 1996.
2. Print ed. via ProQuest (Home ed.). May 7, 1996. p. 2. ProQuest 293423421. (US Newsstream database).
