= The Herald News (disambiguation) =

The Herald News is a newspaper based in Fall River, Massachusetts.

The Herald News may also refer to:

- The Herald-News, based in Joliet, Illinois
- Herald News, based in Woodland Park, New Jersey
