= WSTQ =

WSTQ may refer to:

- WSTQ (FM), a radio station (97.7 FM) licensed to Streator, Illinois, United States
- WSTQ-LP, a defunct low-power television station (channel 14 (cable 6)) formerly licensed to Syracuse, New York, United States
