= Newton Daily News =

The Newton Daily News
- Type: Biweekly newspaper
- Owner: J. Louis Mullen
- Editor: Christopher Braunschweig
- Founded: 1902
- Language: English
- Headquarters: 200 1st Ave. East, Newton, Iowa U.S.
- Circulation: 1,723
- Website: newtondailynews.com

The Newton Daily News is a twice-weekly paper published Tuesdays and Fridays based in Newton, Iowa. The newspaper publishes its main print edition under the banner Newton News but maintains a daily presence on its website. The switch was made in April 2020 due to the effects the coronavirus had on the industry.

In 1944, the newspaper was acquired by Shaw Media, who decades later sold it to J. Louis Mullen in 2025.

== "Gaystapo" controversy ==
In April 2014, the Daily News became the source of controversy when its editor-in-chief, Bob Eschilman, published on his personal blog criticism about a website, The Queen James Bible, that rewrites the Christian Bible to be friendlier to gays and lesbians. Eschliman wrote in part: "If you ask me, it sounds like the Gaystapo is well on its way. We must fight back against the enemy." National media critic Jim Romenesko emailed Eschliman if he thought the Daily News "could fairly cover gay issues when he has 'declared gays the enemy.'" The blog was later removed.

In the wake of the comments, Eschilman was suspended from his position on April 30 and on May 5, Shaw Media announced Eschliman's dismissal. "Last week, he expressed an opinion in his personal blog that in no way reflects the opinion of the Newton Daily News or Shaw Media," Shaw Media president John Rung wrote in an editorial published the day after Eschilman was fired. "While he is entitled to his opinion, his public airing of it compromised the reputation of this newspaper and his ability to lead it." In June, Abigail Pelzer was named the new editor.
