= WGLC (AM) =

Radio station in Mendota, Illinois (1964–1998)

Coordinates: 41°32′56″N 89°07′16″W

- Mendota, Illinois; United States
- Frequency: 1090 kHz

Programming
- Format: Defunct

Ownership
- Sister stations: WGLC-FM

History
- First air date: September 1, 1964
- Last air date: 1998

Technical information
- Facility ID: 41166
- Class: D
- Power: 250 Watts day

WGLC (1090 AM) was a radio station licensed to Mendota, Illinois. The station ran 250 watts during daytime hours only. Its transmitter was located on US 51, 2 miles north of Mendota.

== History ==
WGLC began broadcasting September 1, 1964. It was originally owned by Jeanne Morgan. In May 1965, the station's studios were moved to the First State Bank Building in downtown Mendota. Its sister station, WGLC-FM, began broadcasting September 1, 1965. WGLC's programming would be simulcast on its FM sister station, until AM 1090 was taken off the air in 1998. In 1967, the station was sold to Jel-Co Radio, along with WGLC-FM. Both stations were later sold to Agri-Voice, owned by Michael Ross, for $145,000, effective January 1, 1971.

In the 1970s and early 1980s, the station aired a beautiful music format, along with farm programming. In 1983, the station was sold to Arthur S. Kimball, along with WGLC 1090, for $310,000. By 1984, the station had begun airing an adult contemporary format. In 1988, the station was sold to Studstill Broadcasting, along with WGLC-FM, for $380,000. By 1990, the station had adopted a country music format.

In 1998, WGLC AM 1090 was taken off the air, and its license surrendered, so that WNWI AM 1080 could move from Valparaiso, Indiana, to Oak Lawn, Illinois, and increase power from 250 watts to 1,900 watts. Its sister station, WGLC-FM, remains on the air and airs a classic country format.
