= Kane County Chronicle =

Newspaper in St. Charles, Illinois

- Type: Weekly newspaper
- Format: Tabloid
- Owner: Shaw Media
- Publisher: Laura Shaw
- Editor: Mark Hume
- Founded: 1881
- Language: English
- Headquarters: St. Charles, Illinois
- Country: United States
- Website: www.shawlocal.com/kane-county-chronicle/

Kane County Chronicle is a weekly newspaper, published in St. Charles, Illinois, serving Kane County.

== Market ==
The Kane County Chronicle serves central Kane County, located in the Fox Valley region of Illinois, about 40 miles west of Chicago.

== History ==
Samuel W. Durant founded the Valley Chronicle in 1881. In its first issue, Vol. 1, No. 1, on May 27, 1881, Durant listed the paper's goals: "It will stand aloof from personalities, petty neighborhood difficulties, and unauthorized gossip. It will not wage war on its contemporaries, in the interest of any class, political, religious, sectional or otherwise. Its course will be directed with eye single to the dignified position which journalism should occupy, and in the general interests of the valley and surrounding region."

Durant ran the paper until his death in 1891, after which his brother, Pliney A. Durant, took over its operation. Soon after Pliney took over, John F. Dewey became owner and publisher and, shortly after that, the reins were passed on to Albert L. Hall, who in 1899 changed the name of the paper to the St. Charles Chronicle.

Hall's desire for bigger and better things had him starting the Elgin Daily Courier in 1903, and he sold the paper to his sister-in-law, Lina Paschal, which began a family tradition in town. In 1926, Lina Paschal was named St. Charles postmistress. She sold the paper at that time to local philanthropist Lester Norris. Norris held on to the paper for about 20 years before selling the paper to Paul Paschal, grandfather to Rob and Jim Paschal, whose father Don Paschal was a great-nephew to Lina Paschal. Rob and Jim were the fourth generation of the family to run the Chronicle.

In the 1970s and '80s, the Paschals embarked on expansion, starting the Geneva Chronicle in 1973 and buying the Batavia Herald, which was started in 1893, in 1976. The Elburn Chronicle was formed in 1987.

The Chronicle's first office was located in the building where Steel Beam Theater is now, 111 W. Main Street. The company later moved to 16 S. First Ave. A large front door was installed so that the presses could be moved in. In 1966, the Chronicle moved to east Main Street, leaving its old presses downtown and contracting with an offset printing company.

The Paschals sold the newspaper in 1989 to B.F. Shaw Printing Company (now Shaw Media), the fourth oldest continuously owned and operated family newspaper company in the nation, which built the present Chronicle office at 1000 Randall Road in 1990.

In 1990, the Chronicle's four semi-weekly papers, St. Charles, Geneva, Batavia, and Elburn, combined into one edition with the name changed to the Kane County Chronicle. Up until 1991, the paper had been published twice a week on Wednesday and Friday. In 1991, it began printing five days a week, Tuesday through Saturday, and in 1997, a Monday edition was added. As of 2003, the Chronicle became a daily paper with the addition of a Sunday edition.

Beginning with the 17 March edition, the Chronicle took a new tabloid format. Also, the Chronicle began publishing five days a week, Tuesday through Saturday, as it had between 1991 and 1997. Additionally, an increased local news focus was unveiled.

== See also ==
- Northwest Herald
