= Daily Journal (Illinois) =

- Type: Daily newspaper
- Owner: Shaw Media
- Founded: 1903
- Language: English
- Headquarters: 70 Meadowview Ctr, Kankakee, Illinois 60901; United States
- Website: daily-journal.com

The Daily Journal is the only local daily newspaper in Kankakee, Illinois. Its surrounding circulation area is Kankakee County, which includes the adjacent municipalities of Bourbonnais and Bradley. The newspaper also circulates in portions of the adjacent counties of Ford, Grundy, Iroquois, Livingston, and Will.

The newspaper is published five days a week, on the four afternoons of Monday through Thursday and a fifth daily edition on Saturday morning. No papers are published on Friday or Sunday.

== History ==
The newspaper was founded in 1903.

Beginning the week of Jan. 9, 2023, will publish a print edition on Monday, Wednesday and Saturday. An e-edition will be published on Tuesday and Thursday.

In October 2024, the Small family sold the Daily Journal to Shaw Media.
