= The Herald-News =

Newspaper in Joliet, Illinois

Herald-News

- Type: Daily newspaper
- Format: Tabloid
- Owner: Shaw Media
- Founder: Ira Clifton Copley
- Editor: Judy Harvey
- Founded: 1877
- Language: English
- Headquarters: 1100 Essington Rd, Suite. 4 Joliet, Illinois 60435; USA
- Country: United States
- OCLC number: 30591638
- Website: shawlocal.com/the-herald-news

The Herald-News is a daily newspaper headquartered in Joliet, Illinois, United States. It serves the Joliet, Will County and Grundy County area, and is owned by Shaw Media.

== History ==
The paper was founded in 1904 as the Joliet Herald. In 1913, its founder, Ira Clifton Copley, purchased the Joliet News, a paper that had been founded in 1877. In 1915, the two papers were merged producing the Herald-News. In 2000, Copley Press sold the publication to Hollinger International (later the Sun-Times Media Group). In 2013, Sun-Times sold the Herald News to Shaw Media, parent company of the Northwest Herald.

== Distribution ==
The Herald-News is printed early at one of its parent-company's facilities in Chicago, driven to Northwest Indiana and distributed based on delivery region.
