= WSTQ (FM) =

Radio station in Streator, Illinois

Simulcasts WIVQ, Spring Valley
- Streator, Illinois; United States
- Broadcast area: Ottawa, Illinois
- Frequency: 97.7 MHz
- Branding: Q Hit Music 977 & 1033

Programming
- Format: Top 40/CHR
- Affiliations: Premiere Networks

Ownership
- Owner: Shaw Media; (Shaw Local Radio Co.)
- Sister stations: WALS, WBZG, WGLC-FM, WIVQ, WYYS

History
- Former call signs: WIZZ-FM (1965–1974); WLAX (1974–1984)

Technical information
- Licensing authority: FCC
- Facility ID: 63534
- Class: A
- ERP: 6,000 watts
- HAAT: 100 meters (330 ft)
- Transmitter coordinates: 41°10′49.1″N 88°52′6.3″W

Links
- Public license information: Public file; LMS
- Webcast: Listen Live
- Website: qhitmusic.com

WSTQ (97.7 MHz) is an FM radio station broadcasting a contemporary hit radio format. Licensed to Streator, Illinois, United States, the station serves the Ottawa, Illinois, area. The station is owned by Shaw Media, through licensee Shaw Local Radio Co., after previously being owned by Studstill Media/Mendota Broadcasting Inc. until April 2023.

== History ==
In 1965, the FCC licensed WIZZ-FM to Streator Broadcasting Company, owners of WIZZ (1250 AM; later WSPL). The station became beautiful music WLAX in 1974. In 1984, WLAX became WSTQ and made the switch from beautiful music to a satellite-fed hot AC format. This lasted until the late 1980s, when the station switched to country music.

In 1993, WYYS (106.1 FM), also licensed to Streator, joined WSTQ; they simulcast the country format until the two stations were sold along with co-owned WIZZ to Mendota Broadcasting.

On January 3, 2000, the simulcast with WYYS was split, and WSTQ ran announcements that a format change would be coming the next afternoon. WYYS began simulcasting WIZZ and at 10:00 a.m. on January 4, 2000, WSTQ changed to top 40; the first song played on the new format was Counting Crows' "Hanginaround". It was the area's first true CHR station. There were two hot AC stations—WAJK in La Salle and WRKX in Ottawa—but they did not play any hard rock or rap, which WSTQ did. WSTQ was also used on a local access channel in Streator as well.

On March 6, 2000, WAIV in Spring Valley, another station owned by Mendota Broadcasting, joined WSTQ and the two stations simulcast the CHR format. They are known as Q 97.7 and Q103.3. The Federal Communications Commission (FCC) granted a call sign change to WIVQ on February 26, 2001.

On January 24, 2023, it was announced that Studstill Media had sold WSTQ, along with its sister stations, to Shaw Media in Crystal Lake, Illinois, for a total of $1.8 million. The sale was under FCC review for just under two months before being finalized on March 23, 2023. Shaw Local Radio officially assumed ownership of WSTQ and its sister stations on April 3, 2023.
