= WXEC-LP =

Low-power FM radio station at Eureka College in Eureka, Illinois

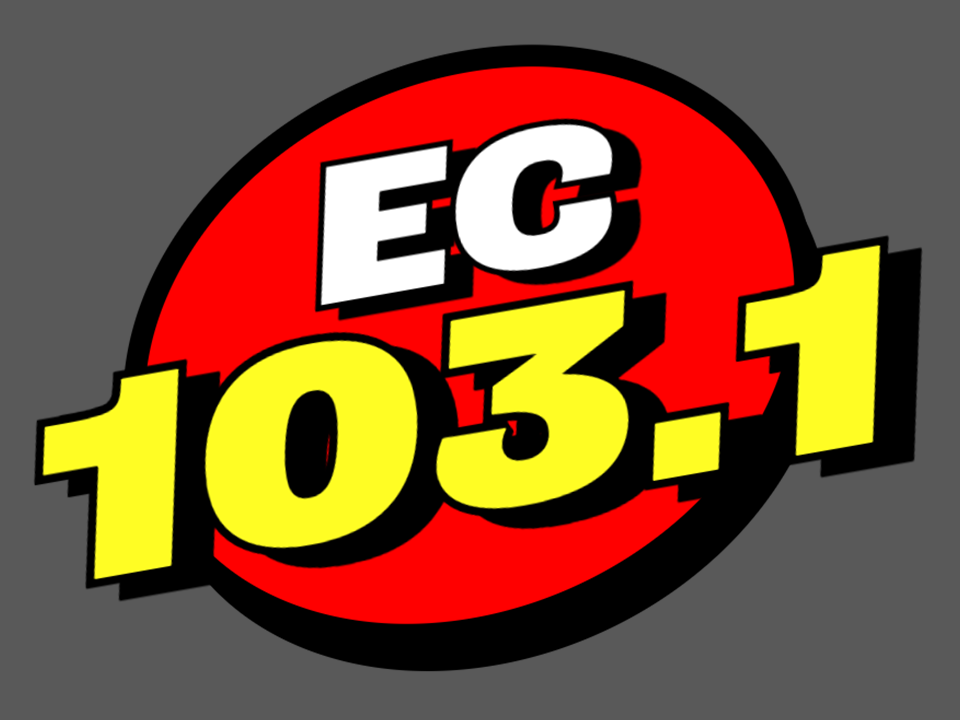
- Eureka, Illinois; United States
- Broadcast area: Woodford County, Illinois
- Frequency: 103.1 MHz
- Branding: EC 103.1

Programming
- Format: College radio, Alternative

Ownership
- Owner: Eureka College
- Sister stations: WLNX

History
- Founded: April 1963
- First air date: March 25, 2024

Technical information
- Licensing authority: FCC
- Facility ID: 779143
- Class: L1
- ERP: 71 watts
- HAAT: 36 meters (118 ft)
- Transmitter coordinates: 40.714111°N 89.268750°W
- Repeater: 88.9 WLNX (Lincoln)

Links
- Public license information: LMS

WXEC-LP (103.1 FM) is a low-power FM radio station licensed for Eureka, Illinois, United States, serving the Woodford County area. The station is staffed by students of Eureka College and airs an alternative rock music format, along with specialty programs and the live sports broadcasts featuring the college's athletic program.

== History ==
=== Early Eureka College radio ===
Student broadcasting at Eureka College appeared in April 1963 when the speech department began operation of WEUR, a 25-watt FM station originating from the top floor of Burgess Hall that could be received within a radius of 300 feet from any building on campus. No records exist that can confirm how long the radio station continued broadcasting beyond 1963.

=== WEUR Internet radio ===
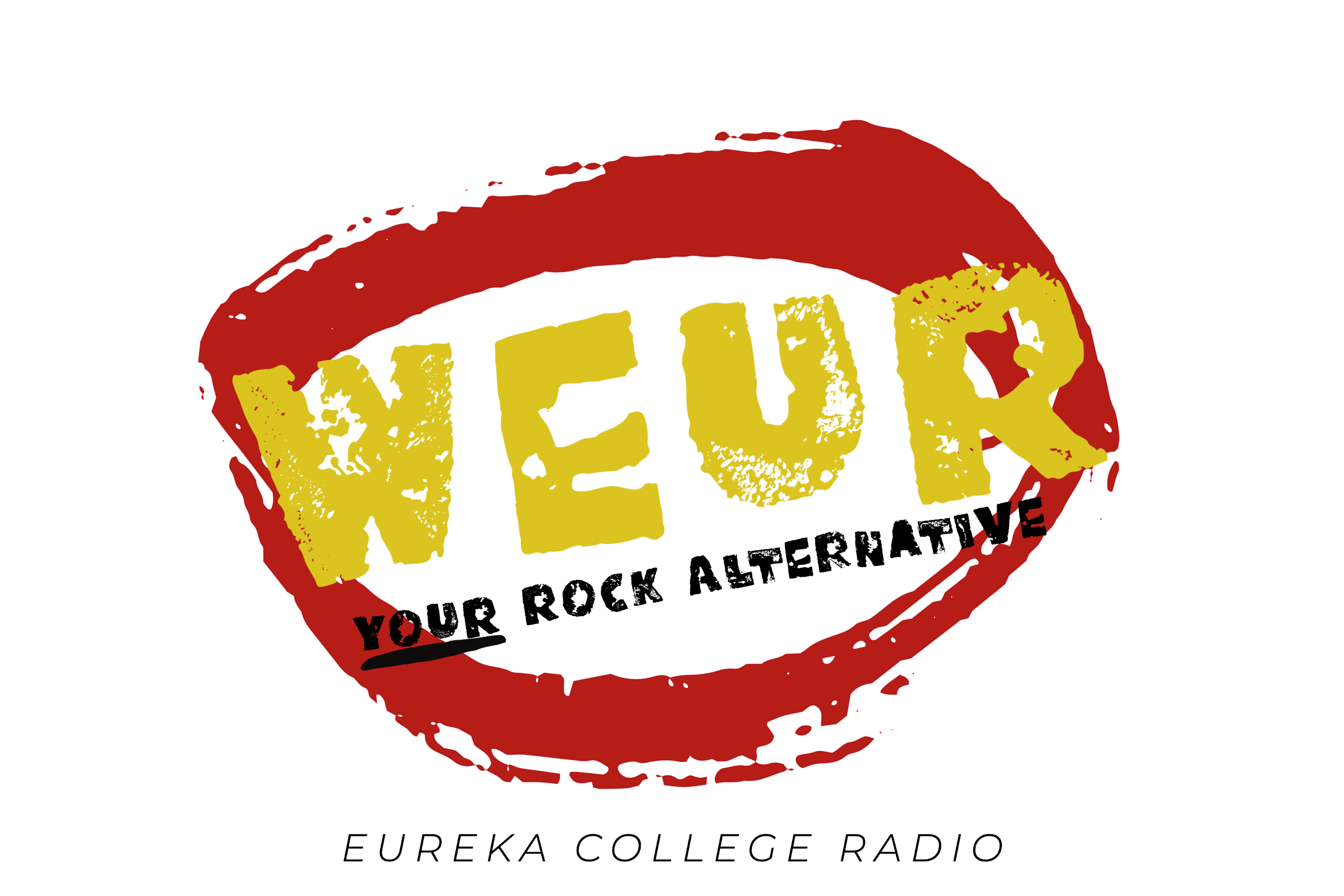
WEUR_LOGO

In October 2022, Eureka College began operating an Internet radio station named WEUR. Eureka College adopted the radio and television academic program and its physical assets from Lincoln College after its May 2022 closure. WEUR then began broadcasting on the iHeartRadio platform position vacated by Lincoln College's WLNX. WLNX resumed broadcasting in May 2024 as a simulcast of WEUR.

=== WXEC-LP ===
Eureka College applied for a low-power FM license during the FCC's December 2023 filing window. The commission issued a construction permit on February 2, 2024. WXEC's license was granted on March 25, 2024, and began broadcasting on the same day.

WXEC operates within Eureka College's Communication and Media Studies degree program at the college. John Malone, a Communication faculty and former director of the Lincoln College radio and television program, serves at the station's General Manager and faculty advisor.
