= WRHL =

Coordinates: 41°55′24″N 89°03′30″W

- Rochelle, Illinois; United States
- Broadcast area: North Central Illinois
- Frequency: 1060 kHz 93.5 MHz
- Branding: Superhits 93.5

Programming
- Format: Classic hits
- Affiliations: ABC Radio News; ABC Sports; Compass Media Networks; Premiere Networks; United Stations Radio Networks; Colbert Media Group

Ownership
- Owner: Rochelle Broadcasting Company
- Sister stations: WYOT

History
- First air date: September 16, 1966
- Call sign meaning: W RocHeLle

Technical information
- Licensing authority: FCC
- Facility ID: 57268
- Class: D
- Power: 250 watts day 50 watts night
- Translator: 93.5 W228DT (Rochelle)

Links
- Public license information: Public file; LMS
- Webcast: Listen live
- Website: www.superhits935.com

WRHL (1060 AM) is a radio station licensed to Rochelle, Illinois, also broadcasting on 93.5 FM The station serves the Rochelle and DeKalb area and airs a classic hits format and is owned by Rochelle Broadcasting Company.

== History ==
The station began broadcasting on September 16, 1966, running 250 watts during daytime hours only. The station was originally owned by Tilton Publications. In 1970, the station was sold to Rochelle Broadcasting Company for $130,000. In 1994, the station added nighttime operations, running 20 watts. In 1995, the station's nighttime power was increased to 50 watts.

In 1996, the station switched from country music programming to a talk format. The station was branded "Newstalk 1060 WRHL". On December 28, 2016, after stunting with Christmas music throughout most of the month as "Santa 1060", WRHL flipped to oldies as "Good Time Oldies 1060". The station is retaining its news elements including its full service morning show hosted by Jeff Leon along with Fox Newscasts & Fox News Updates. Kris Wexell Program Director & Operations Manager. WRHL aired Chicago Bears, Chicago Bulls, and Chicago White Sox Sports. As of January 5, 2018 WRHL held a construction permit for a 250-watt FM translator station, W228DT 93.5 MHz.

On February 12, 2020 the AM (and FM translator) flipped to a classic hits format of music from the 1960s, 1970s, and 1980s. They kept their on-air staff and branded themselves as "Superhits 93.5". This was the first time that their FM translator was ever promoted, and, furthermore, the station no longer references their AM station except for the top-of-the-hour identification. Under Program Director & Operations Manager Kris Wexell, SuperHits 93.5 has a live local morning show with Gary Petersen, Charles Van Horn with News Jeff Leon with Sports and weather with Aaron Wilson, mid-days with Ashley & Brad afternoons with Murphy Sam and Jodi evenings with Rick Dees, and overnights with John Tesh. During the Christmas Holiday, SuperHits 93.5 becomes Your Christmas Super Station with 24/7 Christmas Music. You can also listen to SuperHits 93.5 on iHeart Radio and the iHeart Radio App.

== Former logo ==
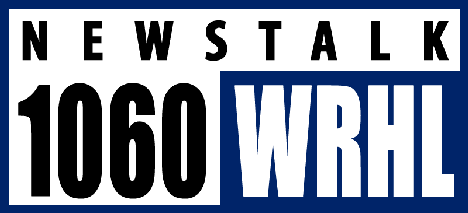
