= WYOT =

Coordinates: 41.923°N 89.058°W

- Rochelle, Illinois; United States
- Broadcast area: North Central Illinois
- Frequency: 102.3 MHz
- Branding: 102.3 The Coyote

Programming
- Format: Country
- Affiliations: ABC Radio News; ABC Sports; Westwood One; Premiere Networks; Sun Broadcast Group

Ownership
- Owner: Rochelle Broadcasting Company
- Sister stations: WRHL

History
- First air date: October 5, 1973
- Former call signs: WRHL-FM (1973-2015)
- Call sign meaning: Coyote

Technical information
- Licensing authority: FCC
- Facility ID: 57269
- Class: A
- ERP: 6,000 watts
- HAAT: 56 meters (184 ft)

Links
- Public license information: Public file; LMS
- Webcast: Listen live
- Website: 1023thecoyote.com

WYOT (102.3 FM, "102.3 The Coyote") is a radio station broadcasting a country music format. Licensed to Rochelle, Illinois, the station serves the Rochelle and DeKalb areas. The station is owned by Rochelle Broadcasting Company.

== Programming ==
The Coyote's programming includes Kris Wexell with Charles Van Horn news and sports with Jeff Leon plus Meteorologist Aaron Wilson weekday mornings, Susan Tyler weekday afternoons, as well as nationally syndicated shows such as The Sandy Show, B-Dub Radio, B-Dub Saturday Night, American Country Countdown, Country Top 30 With Bobby Bones and The Sam Alex Show .

== History ==
The station began broadcasting on October 5, 1973, holding the call sign WRHL-FM, and was a sister station to WRHL 1060. The station initially simulcast the country music programming of WRHL 1060. In 1994, the station's format was changed to adult contemporary, and the station was branded "The Hub". In 2006, the station's format was changed to adult hits, and the station was branded "102.3 Sam-FM". The station aired programming from Dial Global's S.A.M.: Simply About Music, along with local programming.

=== The Coyote ===
In December 2012, the station's format was changed to country music, and the station was branded "102.3 The Coyote". In 2015, the station's call sign was changed to WYOT. 102.3 The Coyote was named "Small Business of the Year" by the Rochelle Chamber of Commerce in 2014. In May 2014, Kris Wexell was recognized by the 98th General Assembly of Illinois for his work with The Coyote. The Coyote was also named the Illinois National Guard's Small Market Station of the Year for 2014. In 2016, 2017, and 2018, Kris Wexell was named by the Illinois Broadcasters Association (IBA), Illinois Radio Personality of the Year for small market, also placing 2nd for Best Morning Show in 2014 and 1st place in 2019, 2020 & 2021. WYOT was also named as one of the Top 3 radio stations in the state of Illinois by the IBA in 2020. In 2024 & 2025 Kris Wexell was chosen as one of Radio Ink's Best Program Directors in Country Radio at CRS in Nashville, and also named one of the Best Program Directors in America by Radio Ink in 2025.

December of 2025 WYOT-FM was named one of the 50 stations nationwide to be finalists for the prestigious 2026 NAB Crystal Radio Awards. These awards honor radio stations for their outstanding year-round commitment to community service and local impact through initiatives like fundraising, disaster relief, and general civic engagement

102.3 The Coyote also is a reporter for Mediabase, Music Row Country Breakout™ Chart & CDX TRACtion Weekly Chart. You can also listen to 102.3 The Coyote on iHeart Radio and the iHeart Radio App. 102.3 The Coyote (WYOT-FM) was named 2022 Station of the Year for Small Market in the State of Illinois by the Illinois Broadcasters Association. 102.3 The Coyote (WYOT-FM) is the Nielsen Rated Number 1 Radio Station in DeKalb & Ogle Counties IL.

Spring of 2026 102.3 The Coyote (WYOT-FM) was nominated by The Academy of Country Music (ACM) for Small Market Radio Station of The Year.
