= WYYS =

Radio station in Streator, Illinois

Coordinates: 41.275°N 88.966°W

- Streator, Illinois; United States
- Broadcast area: LaSalle County
- Frequency: 106.1 MHz (HD Radio)
- Branding: Classic Hits 106

Programming
- Format: Classic hits
- Subchannels: HD2: Soft adult contemporary "Love 98.5"
- Affiliations: Premiere Networks; United Stations Radio Networks

Ownership
- Owner: Shaw Media; (Shaw Local Radio Co.)
- Sister stations: WALS, WBZG, WGLC-FM, WIVQ, WSTQ

History
- First air date: 1995

Technical information
- Licensing authority: FCC
- Facility ID: 35058
- Class: A
- ERP: 2,450 watts
- HAAT: 158.6 meters (520 ft)
- Translator: HD2: 98.5 W253BX (Streator)

Links
- Public license information: Public file; LMS
- Webcast: Listen live HD2: Listen live
- Website: classichits106.com love-985.com (HD2)

WYYS (106.1 FM) is a radio station broadcasting a classic hits format. Licensed to Streator, Illinois, the station covers LaSalle, Ottawa, and vicinity and is owned by Shaw Media, through Shaw Local Radio Co., after previously being owned by Studstill Media/Mendota Broadcasting Inc. until April 2023.

== History ==
WYYS began as a simulcast of co owned WSTQ 97.7 in 1995, airing a country music format. The station was owned by Kleven-Rodriguez Partners. In 2000, the station was bought by Mendota Broadcasting. In January 2000, WYYS began simulcasting the talk radio format of sister station WIZZ AM 1250. In 2002, the station adopted a soft AC format. On December 26, 2004, the station flipped to its current classic hits format.

Former logo

On January 24, 2023, it was announced that Studstill Media had sold WYYS, along with its sister stations, to Shaw Media in Crystal Lake, Illinois, for a total of $1.8 million. The sale was under FCC review for just under two months before being finalized on March 23, 2023. Shaw Local Radio officially assumed ownership of WYYS and its sister stations on April 3, 2023.
