= WLWF =

- Marseilles, Illinois; United States
- Broadcast area: LaSalle-Peru
- Frequency: 96.5 MHz
- Branding: 96.5 The Wolf

Programming
- Format: Country
- Affiliations: Compass Media Networks

Ownership
- Owner: John Spencer; (Starved Rock Media, Inc.)
- Sister stations: WLPO, WAJK

History
- First air date: March 1992
- Former call signs: WKOT-FM (1990–2010)

Technical information
- Licensing authority: FCC
- Facility ID: 3958
- Class: A
- ERP: 2,500 watts
- HAAT: 100 meters (330 ft)
- Transmitter coordinates: 41°18′33.00″N 88°48′45.00″W

Links
- Public license information: Public file; LMS
- Webcast: Listen live
- Website: Official website

WLWF (96.5 FM), branded "96.5 The Wolf", is a radio station broadcasting a country music format. Licensed to Marseilles, Illinois, United States, the station serves the LaSalle-Peru market in the heart of Starved Rock Country. The station is owned by Starved Rock Media, Inc and plays today's country hits and Starved Rock Country Classics and features 20 in a row "Wolf Runs" throughout the day. Rise & Grind with Jaimie (London) & Chris (Yucus) tarts the day. Brad Spelich hosts middays and Clare Bennett afternoons. Taste of Country Nights is featured weeknights. Each weekend listeners hear B-dub Radio Saturday night, American Country Countdown and CT30 with Bobby Bones.

== History ==
The station began broadcasting in March 1992, as WKOT, and aired an oldies format, featuring programming from Satellite Music Network's "Pure Gold" channel. WKOT also featured local personalities, and was branded "Kool 96.5".

The station was originally owned by Barden Broadcasting. In 1998, the station was sold to Pride Communications. In 1999, the station was purchased by La Salle County Broadcasting for $550,000.

By 2006, WKOT's format had shifted to classic hits. In 2010, the station's call sign was changed to WLWF, and it began airing a country music format as "96.5 The Wolf".

On January 1, 2020, the station was purchased from La Salle County Broadcasting Corp. by Starved Rock Media, Inc. Starved Rock Media is a company formed by LCBC employees Steve Vogler and John Spencer.
