= Illiana =

Region around the Indiana-Illinois border

Coordinates: 39°45′N 87°30′W

Illiana is the general area around the border between the U.S. states of Illinois and Indiana, containing the eastern edge of Illinois and the western edge of Indiana. The word is a portmanteau of the two states' names.

The name also applies specifically to Illiana, Illinois, which is the name given to the part of the Indiana town of State Line that protrudes west across the border into Illinois. Illiana is also the namesake of the Illiana Motor Speedway.

== Cities ==
Major Illiana cities include the Chicago metropolitan area and Hammond, Indiana. Danville, Illinois is a significant community in Central Illiana, while the cities of Terre Haute and Evansville lie close to the line further south.

== Colleges and universities ==
The colleges listed below may not be directly on the Illiana line, but are significant to the communities along the border:

In Illinois:

- Danville Area Community College (DACC), Danville
- University of Illinois Urbana-Champaign (UIUC), Urbana-Champaign

In Indiana:

- Indiana State University, Terre Haute
- Purdue University, West Lafayette
- Rose-Hulman Institute of Technology, Terre Haute
- Saint Mary of the Woods College, Saint Mary of the Woods
- University of Evansville, Evansville
- University of Southern Indiana, Evansville

== Highways ==
- Illiana Expressway (proposed and cancelled)
