= WIBK =

Radio station in Watseka, Illinois, United States

- Watseka, Illinois; United States
- Broadcast area: Iroquois County; Benton County; Newton County
- Frequency: 1360 kHz
- Branding: WIBK The Buckle

Programming
- Format: Classic country
- Affiliations: ABC News Radio

Ownership
- Owner: Iroquois County Broadcasting Company
- Sister stations: WGFA-FM

History
- First air date: September 1, 1961
- Last air date: May 2024
- Former call signs: WGFA (1961–2017)

Technical information
- Licensing authority: FCC
- Facility ID: 29202
- Class: D
- Power: 1,000 watts day
- Transmitter coordinates: 40°47′37.1″N 87°45′17.1″W
- Translator: 96.9 W245CV (Watseka)
- Repeater: 94.1 WGFA-FM HD2 (Watseka)

Links
- Public license information: Public file; LMS
- Website: www.wibkradio.com

WIBK (1360 AM) was a classic country-formatted broadcast radio station licensed to Watseka, Illinois, serving Watseka and Eastern Iroquois County, Illinois, and Western Benton and Southern Newton counties in Indiana. WIBK was a daytime only station and was owned and operated by Iroquois County Broadcasting Company, which is owned by Richard and Margaret Martin.

WIBK was an AM radio station broadcasting on the regional frequency of 1360 kHz. The WIBK antenna was a three-tower array. The station was a member of the National Association of Farm Broadcasters.

== History ==
The original call letters were WGFA. WIBK changed format from talk radio to country music on August 25, 2017.

On May 1, 2024, the owners filed for special temporary authority with the Federal Communications Commission (FCC) to take the station silent. The WIBK license was surrendered in April 2025; it was cancelled on May 1, 2025.

== Signal ==
WIBK's signal was beamed towards the southeast to protect the signal of WLBK in Dekalb, Illinois. WIBK used a three-tower antenna array.

== Translator ==
In addition to the main station, WIBK was relayed by an FM translator to widen its broadcast area and to provide nighttime coverage.

Broadcast translator for WIBK
Call sign	Frequency	City of license	FID	ERP (W)	Class	Transmitter coordinates	FCC info
W245CV	96.9 FM	Watseka, Illinois	142613	250	D	40°47′37.1″N 87°45′17.1″W	LMS

W245CV, also owned by Iroguois County Broadcasting Company, now relays the second HD Radio channel of WGFA-FM.
