= WLPO =

Radio station in LaSalle, Illinois

Coordinates: 41°18′14″N 89°05′44″W

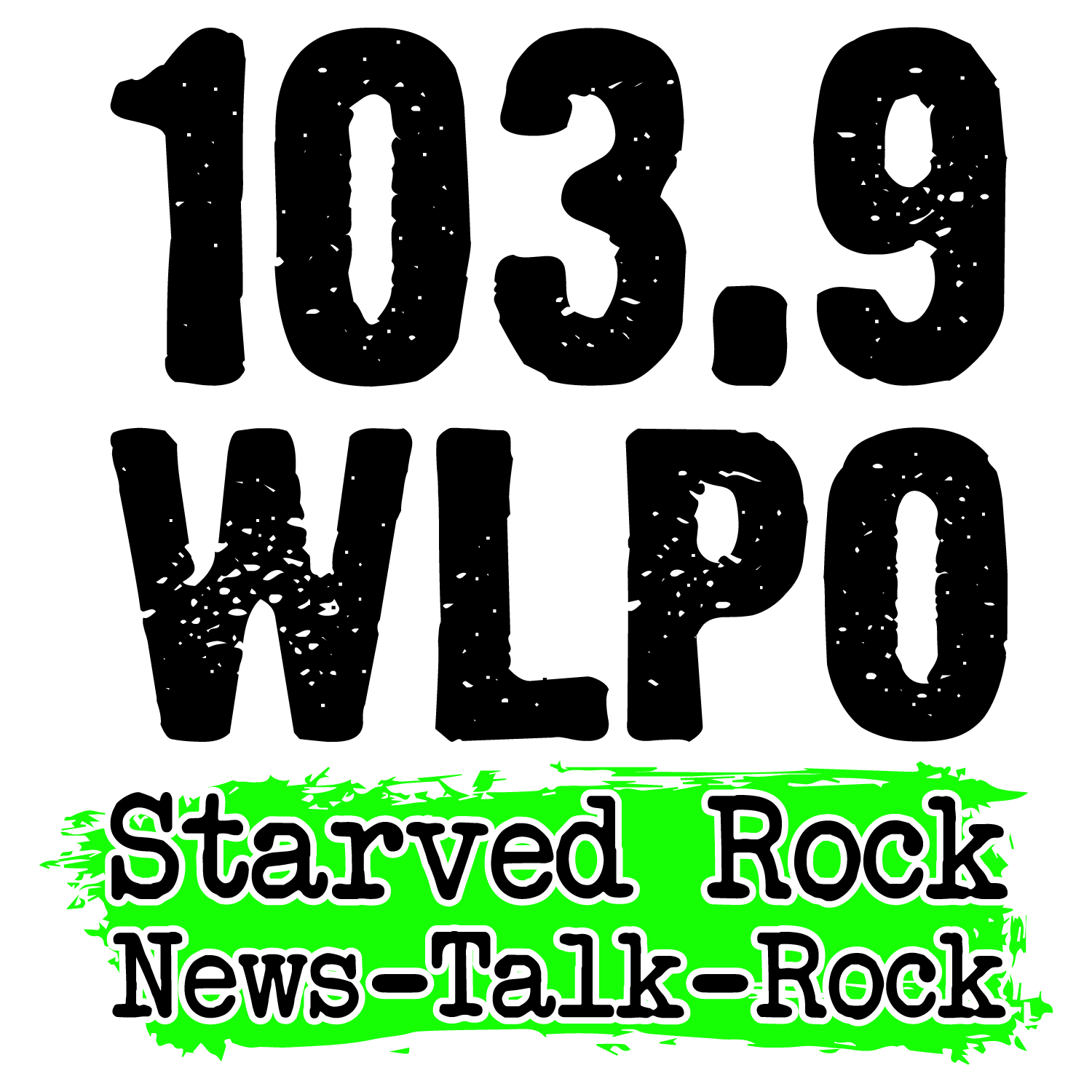
- LaSalle, Illinois; United States
- Broadcast area: Northern Illinois / LaSalle - Peru
- Frequency: 1220 kHz
- Branding: 103.9 WLPO

Programming
- Format: News-Talk-Rock

Ownership
- Owner: John Spencer; (Starved Rock Media, Inc.)
- Sister stations: WAJK, WLWF

History
- First air date: November 16, 1947
- Call sign meaning: LaSalle-Peru-Oglesby

Technical information
- Licensing authority: FCC
- Facility ID: 36645
- Class: B
- Power: 1,000 watts day 500 watts night
- Translator: 103.9 W280EG (Peru)

Links
- Public license information: Public file; LMS
- Webcast: Listen Live
- Website: WLPO Online

WLPO (1220 AM) is a radio station licensed to LaSalle, Illinois covering Northern Illinois, including LaSalle, Ottawa, and Princeton from the heart of Starved Rock Country. The station features news and talk in conjunction with a classic rock format. WLPO-AM/FM is ranked #6 in the market ratings. Station personalities include Rod (Thorson) and Tom (Henson) in the morning, Clare Bennett middays and Jeremy Aitken (news director) afternoons. On January 1, 2020, the stations were purchased by Starved Rock Media, Inc. Starved Rock Media is a company formed by long-time employees Steve Vogler and John Spencer.

== History ==
The station began broadcasting on November 16, 1947, and originally ran 250 watts during daytime hours only. In 1957, the station's power was increased to 1,000 watts, and it began using a directional array. For many years, the station aired an MOR format, with farm and talk programming as well. By 1988, the station had added nighttime operations, running 500 watts at night. By 1997, the station's music programming would be changed to oldies. The station was branded the "Spirit of the Valley".

By 2005, the station was completely airing a news-talk format branded the "Voice of the Valley". It would later be branded the "News and Talk of the Valley". During this period, the station variety of local programming as well as nationally syndicated shows, such as Glenn Beck, Rush Limbaugh, Dave Ramsey, Dennis Miller, and Dr. Joy Browne. On December 26, 2013, the station began airing a classic hits format.

== Translator ==
In June 2013, 103.9 signed on as a 24-hour simulcast of WLPO AM 1220. The FM simulcast gives the station better coverage over the Illinois Valley and Starved Rock areas, especially at night when WLPO AM is legally required to lower their power so they don't interfere with other stations on the frequency.

| Call sign | Frequency | City of license | FID | ERP (W) | HAAT | Class | FCC info |
|---|---|---|---|---|---|---|---|
| W280EG | 103.9 FM | Peru, Illinois | 151843 | 250 | 62.6 m (205 ft) | D | LMS |
