= WLNX =

- Lincoln, Illinois; United States
- Frequency: 88.9 MHz

Programming
- Format: Christian

Ownership
- Owner: Independent Baptist Media

History
- First air date: January 1974
- Call sign meaning: "Lynx", Lincoln College (former owner) school mascot

Technical information
- Licensing authority: FCC
- Facility ID: 37558
- Class: A
- ERP: 225 watts
- HAAT: 21 meters (69 ft)
- Transmitter coordinates: 40°9′23.00″N 89°21′40.00″W

Links
- Public license information: Public file; LMS
- Website: https://ibmradio.com/

WLNX (88.9 FM) is a Christian radio station licensed to Lincoln, Illinois, United States.

From 1974 to 2022, the station was the campus radio station of Lincoln College, last broadcasting an alternative rock format. It was silent from June 2022 to May 2023 as the result of the college's closure after the spring 2022 semester and was put up for sale. It resumed broadcasting in May 2023, went silent again in July 2023, and resumed broadcasting again on May 10, 2024 after the announcement of its sale to Independent Baptist Media, Inc.

== History ==
=== Lincoln College ownership ===
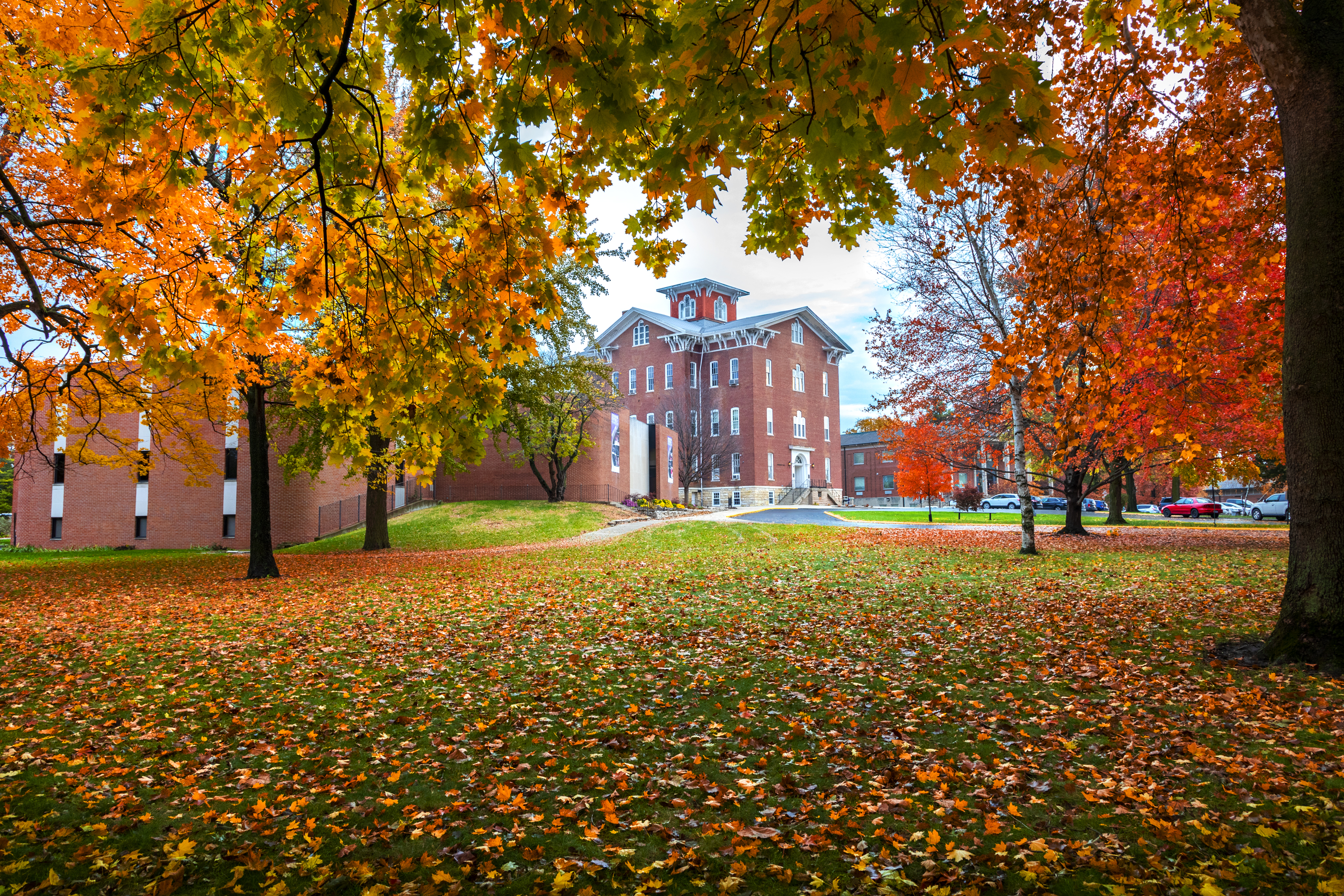
University Hall at Lincoln College

On October 12, 1973, Lincoln College (Note: The licensee was listed as Lincoln University, the original name under which the institution was chartered, with the FCC for its entire history.) obtained a construction permit for a new educational radio station, originally with 10 watts on 90.1 MHz. The station began broadcasting in January 1974 with test programming and formally launched on February 18 from studios in the basement of University Hall. Power was increased to 225 watts in 1982 along with a frequency change to 88.9 MHz.

The founder of the radio station was Brayton Danner, a long-time science instructor at Lincoln College. Student interest caused Danner to found the Lincoln College Broadcasting Club, initially exploring the world of amateur radio operation. As student interest in broadcasting grew, Danner spent countless hours soliciting support for a broadcast radio station. He, along with the station's first chief engineer, Ray Knochel, set up the initial studios of WLNX. To complement the interest in broadcasting, Danner also petitioned the college and had broadcasting courses added to the curriculum. He taught these classes as part of his full-time duties, in addition to also serving as faculty adviser and general manager of the station from 1974 to 1987. Danner continued overseeing the broadcasting program as a part-time instructor toward the end of his employment at Lincoln College, although he maintained an interest in the radio station as well as groundskeeping, photography, and other aspects of the Lincoln College campus.

During its early years, WLNX aired music from a wide variety of genres. The initial philosophy of the founders was that the station was created by students for students, and students should determine the programming. Due to the FCC requirements that stations operate "in the public interest, convenience, and necessity," WLNX aired a variety of public affairs types of programming. Religious services from Lincoln Christian Church were broadcast Sunday mornings, students put together newscasts of both national and campus items, and various programs and public service announcements were incorporated into the station's broadcast schedule. While providing these programs to satisfy FCC licensing requirements, such programming was also aired in an effort to build the station into more than just a "free on-air jukebox." In an effort to provide a more consistent "sound" for the station, as well as taking into account college radio's place within the music industry, an effort was made early in the 1980s to emphasize alternative and new music.

Until 2004, the broadcasting schedule of WLNX always mirrored the semesters of the Lincoln College academic calendar, never broadcasting 24 hours per day. The station would routinely sign off during summer recess and for all scheduled breaks.

In mid-2004, WLNX began a satellite-delivered simulcast of classical music station WCPE-FM in Raleigh, North Carolina. At the same time, with the addition of computers and broadcast automation software, WLNX began broadcasting 24 hours a day, seven days a week. Under Malone's direction, during the fall of 2005, WLNX returned to local programming with a student-run and strictly formatted station. On November 22, 2006, after one year of airing a classic rock format, WLNX re-christened itself "89X - Lincoln's New Rock Alternative" and began airing a modern alternative rock format. A year later, it began streaming on the internet.

Following Danner, local commercial radio veteran Jim Ash, who worked at WLNX when attending college at LC, was hired as part-time instructor and general manager of the station from 1987 to 1989. Lincoln College and WLNX alumnus Lloyd Kirby was hired as full-time instructor and general manager of the station from 1989 to 1998. In August 2004, Lincoln College hired John Malone, a veteran broadcaster from the Peoria, Illinois, market. On June 11, 2006, the WLNX facility narrowly survived a fire that damaged portions of two floors of the historic building.

In the fall of 2013, WLNX departed from its alternative rock format in favor of active rock, though it switched to its original By the fall of 2014, the station quietly reverted to its original alternative rock format, featuring an even more pop-focused playlist. Lincoln College added management of a cable access channel and started a four-year radio, television, and new media degree program in 2016.

=== Closure and sale ===
In early 2022, Lincoln College suffered a cyberattack that severely disrupted the university's enrollment systems, creating additional strains atop the effects of COVID-19, and led it to announce it would close after 157 years. On June 3, 2022, as part of the winding down of the college's operations, WLNX went off the air and was placed up for sale. It resumed broadcasting on May 10, 2024, after being silent since July 2023 and broadcasting from May to July 2023. It was sold to Independent Baptist Media in for $15,000 in 2024, and relaunched as a simulcast of WXEC-LP at Eureka College in Eureka, Illinois, which became the home of the Lincoln College broadcasting equipment and faculty after its closure.
