= WXNU =

Coordinates: 41.006°N 87.695°W

- St. Anne, Illinois; United States
- Broadcast area: Kankakee, Illinois
- Frequency: 106.5 MHz
- Branding: X Country

Programming
- Format: Country music

Ownership
- Owner: Shaw Media
- Sister stations: WKAN, WYKT

History
- First air date: 2006

Technical information
- Licensing authority: FCC
- Facility ID: 164267
- Class: A
- ERP: 1,950 Watts
- HAAT: 141 meters (463 ft)

Links
- Public license information: Public file; LMS
- Webcast: Listen live
- Website: www.xcountry1065.com

WXNU (106.5 FM) is a radio station licensed to St. Anne, Illinois, and serving Kankakee County, and Iroquois County in Illinois, and Newton County in Indiana. The station first started its broadcasts in 2006. WXNU has a country music format and is owned by Shaw Media.

Hosts include Bill Yohnka, weekdays 6 am-9 am, Kendra, weekdays 10 am-2 pm, and Scott Hardy, weekdays 4 pm-6 pm.

Other programming includes Country Countdown USA with Lon Helton. Each week, a charted country star joins Helton to count down the week’s Top 30. It airs on WXNU on Sundays from 8am-11am.

During the high school football and basketball season, the station broadcasts the game of the week with Game Night.

WXNU is the most listened to radio station in Kankakee County.
