= WOKZ (FM) =

- Fairfield, Illinois; United States
- Frequency: 105.9 MHz
- Branding: Real Country 105.9

Programming
- Format: Country music

Ownership
- Owner: The Original Company, Inc.
- Sister stations: WFIW, WFIW-FM

History
- First air date: September 1996

Technical information
- Licensing authority: FCC
- Facility ID: 71164
- Class: A
- ERP: 6,000 watts
- HAAT: 100 meters (330 ft)
- Transmitter coordinates: 38.3794921°N 88.3258782°W

Links
- Public license information: Public file; LMS
- Website: wfiwradio.com

WOKZ (105.9 FM) is a radio station broadcasting a country music format. Licensed to Fairfield, Illinois, the station is owned by The Original Company, Inc.

== History ==
The station began broadcasting in September 1996, airing a country music format. The station was originally owned by David Land's Wayne County Broadcasting Co. In 2012, Land sold WOKZ, along with WFIW and WFIW-FM, to The Original Company for $962,766.67.

The call letters WOKZ-FM were previously assigned to a station in Alton, Illinois; it began broadcasting in 1948 on 99.9 MHz.
