= WBZG =

Radio station in Peru, Illinois

- Peru, Illinois; United States
- Broadcast area: LaSalle / Princeton
- Frequency: 100.9 MHz
- Branding: 100.9 FM Rocks!

Programming
- Format: Classic rock
- Affiliations: Westwood One

Ownership
- Owner: Shaw Media; (Shaw Local Radio Co.)
- Sister stations: WALS, WGLC-FM, WIVQ, WSTQ, WYYS

History
- First air date: March 15, 1970
- Former call signs: WGSY (1969–1977); WIVQ (1977–1984); WLRZ (1984–2000)
- Call sign meaning: For aborted rock branding of The Buzz

Technical information
- Licensing authority: FCC
- Facility ID: 69732
- Class: A
- ERP: 3,000 watts
- HAAT: 100 meters (330 ft)
- Transmitter coordinates: 41.303°N 89.236°W

Links
- Public license information: Public file; LMS
- Webcast: Listen live
- Website: wbzg.net

WBZG (100.9 FM) is a radio station licensed to Peru, Illinois, covering, LaSalle, Peru, Princeton, and Vicinity. WBZG airs a classic rock format and is owned by Shaw Media, through licensee Shaw Local Radio Co., after previously being owned by Studstill Media/Mendota Broadcasting, Inc. until April 2023.

== History ==
=== WGSY ===
The station began broadcasting on March 15, 1970, holding the call sign WGSY. The station was originally owned by George W. Yazell, and had an ERP of 3,000 watts at a HAAT of 145 feet. WGSY aired a variety format. In 1977, the station was sold to Radio Illinois, Ltd. for $85,000.

=== WIVQ ===
In 1977, the station's call sign was changed to WIVQ, and the station began airing a MOR format. By 1980, the station had begun airing an adult rock format. By 1983, the station had begun airing a beautiful music/easy listening format. By 1984, the station was airing a MOR format. In 1984, the station was sold to Starved Rock Radio Project for $155,000.

=== WLRZ ===
In September 1984, the station's call sign was changed to WLRZ. WLRZ would air an adult contemporary format. By 1990, the station had begun airing a classic rock format. In 1994, the station was sold to Valley Plus Broadcasting for $150,000. In 1997, the station was sold to Mendota Broadcasting, Inc., along with 103.3 WAIV, for $700,000.

=== WBZG ===
In July 2000, the station's call sign was changed to WBZG, and the station was branded "The Buzz". However, in August 2000, 107.7 WBZM in Bloomington would begin broadcasting with "The Buzz" branding, airing a modern rock format. Unbeknownst to WBZG, the owner of WBZM had trademarked "The Buzz" branding for the entire state of Illinois, and WBZG stopped calling itself "The Buzz" to avoid a lawsuit. The station would later be branded "100.9 FM Rocks!".

On January 24, 2023, it was announced that Studstill Media had sold WBZG, along with its sister stations, to Shaw Media in Crystal Lake, Illinois, for a total of $1.8 million. The sale was under FCC review for just under two months before being finalized on March 23, 2023. Shaw Local Radio officially assumed ownership of WBZG and its sister stations on April 3, 2023.
