= WGLC-FM =

Radio station in Mendota, Illinois

Coordinates: 41.538°N 89.107°W

- Mendota, Illinois; United States
- Broadcast area: Mendota / LaSalle
- Frequency: 100.1 MHz

Programming
- Format: Classic country
- Affiliations: United Stations Radio Networks; Westwood One

Ownership
- Owner: Shaw Media; (Shaw Local Radio Co.)
- Sister stations: WALS, WBZG, WIVQ, WSTQ, WYYS

History
- First air date: September 1, 1965

Technical information
- Licensing authority: FCC
- Facility ID: 41165
- Class: A
- ERP: 6,000 watts
- HAAT: 100 meters (330 ft)

Links
- Public license information: Public file; LMS
- Webcast: Listen Live
- Website: www.wglc.net

WGLC-FM (100.1 MHz) is a radio station licensed to Mendota, Illinois, covering Northern Illinois, including Mendota, LaSalle, Princeton, and Peru. WGLC-FM has a classic country music format and is owned by Shaw Media, through licensee Shaw Local Radio Co., after being owned by Studstill Media/Mendota Broadcasting, Inc. until April 2023. The station abandoned local content and hosts on January 2, 2025, and now airs the Westwood One Classic Country satellite programming 24/7, ending a 50 year legacy of local programming.

Its tower is located by the county fairgrounds on East 3rd Road, southeast of Mendota. It broadcasts from studios at 3905 Progress Blvd in Peru, shared with its sister stations. The station is the home to the Mendota Trojans of Mendota Township High School, broadcasting all the football games every season.

== History ==
WGLC-FM began broadcasting September 1, 1965. At the time, it was a sister station to WGLC AM 1090, and simulcast its programming during the daytime hours its sister station was on the air. It originally broadcast on 100.9 MHz with an ERP of 3,000 watts and a tower height of 98 feet. The station's studios were originally inside the First State Bank Building in downtown Mendota, with its tower atop the building. The station was originally owned by Jeanne Morgan. In 1967, the station was sold to Jel-Co Radio. In 1970, the station's frequency was changed to 100.1 MHz, and the station was sold to Agri-Voice, along with WGLC 1090, for $145,000, effective January 1, 1971.

In the 1970s and early 1980s, the station aired a beautiful music format, along with farm programming. In 1983, the station was sold to Arthur S. Kimball, along with WGLC 1090, for $310,000. By 1984, the station had begun airing an adult contemporary format. In 1988, the station was sold to Studstill Broadcasting, along with WGLC 1090, for $380,000. By 1989, the station's HAAT had been increased to 328 ft. By 1990, the station had adopted a country music format. By 1991, the station's ERP had been increased to 6,000 watts. In 1998, WGLC 1090 was taken off the air so that another station could increase power, and the long standing simulcast ended.

Previous logo

On January 24, 2023, it was announced that Studstill Media had sold WGLC-FM, along with its sister stations, to Shaw Media in Crystal Lake, Illinois, for a total of $1.8 million. The sale was under FCC review for just under two months before being finalized on March 23, 2023. Shaw Local Radio officially assumed ownership of WGLC-FM and its sister stations on April 3, 2023.
