= WURX (FM) =

Coordinates: 42.072°N 89.419°W

- Oregon, Illinois; United States
- Broadcast area: Northern Illinois / Rockford / Dixon, Illinois
- Frequency: 95.7 MHz
- Branding: 95.7 The Rock

Programming
- Format: Classic rock

Ownership
- Owner: Shaw Media; (Shaw Family Holdings, LLC)
- Sister stations: WIXN, WRCV

History
- First air date: December 27, 1999 (as WSEY)
- Former call signs: WSEY (1999-2025)

Technical information
- Licensing authority: FCC
- Facility ID: 1641
- Class: A
- ERP: 3,200 watts
- HAAT: 109 meters (358 ft)

Links
- Public license information: Public file; LMS
- Webcast: Listen live
- Website: www.therock957.com

WURX (95.7 FM, "95.7 The Rock") is a radio station licensed to Oregon, Illinois, covering Northern Illinois, including Rockford, Dixon, and Freeport. WURX currently airs a classic rock format and is owned by Shaw Media.

== History ==
Former "Kool 95.7" logo

The station began broadcasting December 27, 1999, airing Christmas music, beginning its oldies format in January 2000. The station's format would later shift to classic hits. Two decades later in February 2020, WSEY changed its format and branding as Sky 95.7 broadcasting an adult contemporary format. WSEY has recently applied for the call letters WURX, to be effective on July 1, 2025.

On July 1, 2025, WURX changed their format from adult contemporary to classic rock, branded as "95.7 The Rock".
