= WSIQ =

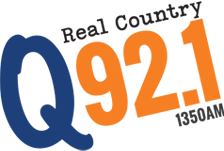
- Salem, Illinois; United States
- Frequency: 1350 kHz
- Branding: Q 92.1

Programming
- Format: country music

Ownership
- Owner: SCI Multimedia, LLC
- Sister stations: WJBD-FM

History
- First air date: December 14, 1956
- Former call signs: WJBD (AM)

Technical information
- Licensing authority: FCC
- Facility ID: 70298
- Class: D
- Power: 430 watts daytime 59 watts nighttime
- Transmitter coordinates: type:city 38°37′56.00″N 88°55′2.00″W

Links
- Public license information: Public file; LMS
- Website: www.southernillinoisnow.com

WSIQ is an AM radio station licensed to Salem, Illinois and broadcasting on the frequency of 1350 kHz. The format for WSIQ is Country music and is known as Q 92.1.

Previous call letters were WJBD (AM) and are still used for the FM station.

== FM Translator ==
WSIQ can also be heard at 92.1 MHz. W221DU is owned by SCI Multimedia, LLC led by long time General Manager Bruce Kropp.

Call sign	Frequency	City of license	FID	ERP (W)	Class	FCC info
W221DU	92.1 FM	Salem, IL	157749	250	D	LMS
