= WSMI (AM) =

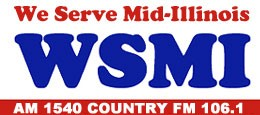
- Litchfield, Illinois; United States
- Frequency: 1540 kHz

Programming
- Format: Classic country

Ownership
- Owner: Talley Broadcasting Corporation
- Sister stations: WSMI-FM

History
- Call sign meaning: We Serve Mid-Illinois

Technical information
- Licensing authority: FCC
- Facility ID: 64565
- Class: D
- Power: 1,000 watts (days only)
- Transmitter coordinates: 39°10′21″N 89°34′14″W
- Translators: 92.9 W225CX (Staunton); 105.9 W295BQ (Litchfield)

Links
- Public license information: Public file; LMS
- Website: wsmiradio.com

WSMI 1540 AM is a radio station broadcasting a Classic Country format. Licensed to Litchfield, Illinois, the station operates only during daytime hours, and is owned by Talley Broadcasting Corporation. WSMI rebroadcasts on translators W225CX at 92.9 MHz, in Staunton, and W295BQ at 106.9 MHz, in Litchfield, which can be heard 24 hours a day.

Operations first began in Carlinville IL, in November 1950, when it signed on at the campus of Blackburn College A 550 foot radio tower was erected between Litchfield and Hillsboro.
