= WALS =

Radio station in Oglesby, Illinois

- Oglesby, Illinois; United States
- Broadcast area: LaSalle-Peru
- Frequency: 102.1 MHz
- Branding: WALLS 102

Programming
- Format: Country
- Affiliations: Performance Racing Network; Premiere Networks

Ownership
- Owner: Shaw Media; (Shaw Local Radio Co.)
- Sister stations: WBZG, WGLC-FM, WIVQ, WSTQ, WYYS

History
- First air date: 1993
- Former call signs: WZLC (1993–1995)
- Call sign meaning: "Walls"

Technical information
- Licensing authority: FCC
- Facility ID: 17316
- Class: A
- ERP: 2,250 watts
- HAAT: 166 meters (545 ft)
- Transmitter coordinates: 41°16′30.00″N 88°57′56.00″W

Links
- Public license information: Public file; LMS
- Website: Official website

WALS (102.1 FM) is an American radio station broadcasting a country music format. Licensed to Oglesby, Illinois, United States, the station serves the LaSalle-Peru area. Branded as WALLS 102, the station is owned by Shaw Media, through licensee Shaw Local Radio Co., after being previously owned by Studstill Media/Laco Radio until April 2023. The flagship program is "The Morning Show with Dani" weekday mornings.

== History ==
The station was assigned the call sign WZLC on February 26, 1993. At first, it simulcast the country music format of co-owned WGLC-FM in Mendota, Illinois. WZLC was put on the air to give WGLC coverage in the southern part of the La Salle/Peru area. On February 1, 1995, the station changed its call sign to the current WALS and started carrying separate country music programming.

On January 24, 2023, it was announced that Studstill Media had sold WALS, along with its sister stations, to Shaw Media in Crystal Lake, Illinois, for a total of $1.8 million. The sale was under FCC review for just under two months before being finalized on March 23, 2023. Shaw Local Radio officially assumed ownership of WALS and its sister stations on April 3, 2023.
