= WIXN =

- Dixon, Illinois; United States
- Broadcast area: Northern Illinois
- Frequency: 1460 kHz
- Branding: FM 95.1 and AM 1460

Programming
- Format: Oldies
- Affiliations: ABC News Radio; Westwood One

Ownership
- Owner: Shaw Media; (Shaw Family Holdings, LLC)
- Sister stations: WRCV; WSEY

History
- First air date: 1961

Technical information
- Licensing authority: FCC
- Facility ID: 21201
- Class: D
- Power: 1,000 watts (day); 23 watts (night)
- Transmitter coordinates: 41°49′38″N 89°29′11″W
- Translator: 95.1 W236DM (Dixon)

Links
- Public license information: Public file; LMS
- Webcast: Listen live
- Website: www.am1460wixn.com

WIXN (1460 AM) is a radio station licensed to Dixon, Illinois, covering Northern Illinois. WIXN airs an oldies format, and is owned by Shaw Media. The station is also rebroadcast on translator station W236DM 95.1 FM in Dixon.
