= WIVQ =

Radio station in Spring Valley, Illinois

- Spring Valley, Illinois; United States
- Broadcast area: La Salle-Peru
- Frequency: 103.3 MHz
- Branding: Q Hit Music 977 & 1033

Programming
- Format: Top 40/CHR
- Affiliations: Premiere Networks

Ownership
- Owner: Shaw Media; (Shaw Local Radio Co.)
- Sister stations: WALS, WBZG, WGLC-FM, WSTQ, WYYS

History
- First air date: April 1994
- Former call signs: WAIV (1990–2001)

Technical information
- Licensing authority: FCC
- Facility ID: 28312
- Class: A
- ERP: 4,900 watts
- HAAT: 110 meters (360 feet)
- Transmitter coordinates: 41°18′09″N 89°14′11″W
- Repeater: 97.7 WSTQ (Streator)

Links
- Public license information: Public file; LMS
- Webcast: Listen Live
- Website: qhitmusic.com

WIVQ (103.3 FM) is a radio station licensed to serve Spring Valley, Illinois, United States, serving the La Salle-Peru area. The station is owned by Shaw Media, through licensee Shaw Local Radio Co, after being previously owned by Studstill Media/Mendota Broadcasting Inc. until April 2023.

WIVQ broadcasts a contemporary hit radio format as a simulcast with sister station WSTQ.

The station was assigned the WIVQ call sign by the Federal Communications Commission on February 26, 2001.

== History ==
WIVQ signed on in April 1994 as WAIV, carrying a talk radio format. In the spring of 1997, the station was sold along with co-owned WLRZ (now WBZG) from Crest Broadcasting to "The Radio Group" also known as Mendota Broadcasting. In July 1997, the station switched from all-talk to adult contemporary, using ABC Radio's Starstation format. It kept the AC format until March 6, 2000, at 9 p.m., when it began simulcasting a top 40 format with WSTQ.

On January 24, 2023, it was announced that Studstill Media had sold WIVQ, along with its sister stations, to Shaw Media in Crystal Lake, Illinois, for a total of $1.8 million. The sale was under FCC review for just under two months before being finalized on March 23, 2023. Shaw Local Radio officially assumed ownership of WIVQ and its sister stations on April 3, 2023.
