= WGFA-FM =

- Watseka, Illinois; United States
- Broadcast area: Central Illiana
- Frequency: 94.1 MHz (HD Radio)
- Branding: 94.1 WGFA

Programming
- Format: Adult contemporary
- Subchannels: HD2: Classic country "96.9 The Buckle"
- Affiliations: ABC News Radio

Ownership
- Owner: Iroquois County Broadcasting Company

History
- First air date: March 2, 1962
- Call sign meaning: "World's Greatest Farming Area"

Technical information
- Licensing authority: FCC
- Facility ID: 29203
- Class: B
- ERP: 50,000 watts
- HAAT: 111 meters (364 ft)
- Transmitter coordinates: 40°47′37.1″N 87°45′17.1″W
- Translator: HD2: 96.9 W245CV (Watseka)

Links
- Public license information: Public file; LMS
- Webcast: Listen live; HD2: Listen live
- Website: wgfaradio.com; HD2: www.969thebuckle.com

WGFA-FM (94.1 MHz) is an adult contemporary formatted broadcast radio station licensed to Watseka, Illinois, serving Central Illiana. WGFA-FM is owned and operated by Iroquois County Broadcasting Company.

The station began broadcasting March 2, 1962.

== HD Radio ==
WGFA-FM's second HD Radio channel carries a classic country format, "96.7 The Buckle", which is also heard on FM translator W245CV (96.9).

Broadcast translator for WGFA-FM HD2
Call sign	Frequency	City of license	FID	ERP (W)	Class	Transmitter coordinates	FCC info
W245CV	96.9 FM	Watseka, Illinois	142613	250	D	40°47′37.1″N 87°45′17.1″W	LMS
