= WFIW (AM) =

Coordinates: 38°22′46″N 88°19′33″W

- Fairfield, Illinois; United States
- Broadcast area: Fairfield, Illinois
- Frequency: 1390 kHz

Programming
- Format: News Talk / Sports
- Affiliations: Genesis Communications Network; Premiere Networks; Radio America; USA Radio Network

Ownership
- Owner: The Original Company, Inc.
- Sister stations: WFIW-FM, WOKZ

History
- First air date: August 21, 1953
- Call sign meaning: "Fairfield-Illinois-Wayne"

Technical information
- Licensing authority: FCC
- Facility ID: 71167
- Class: D
- Power: 710 watts day 58 watts night
- Translator: 103.3 W277CZ (Fairfield)

Links
- Public license information: Public file; LMS
- Website: www.wfiwradio.com

WFIW (1390 kHz) is an AM radio station broadcasting a news talk format. Licensed to Fairfield, Illinois, the station is currently owned by The Original Company, Inc., which also owns WFIW-FM 104.9 FM and WOKZ 105.9 FM. WFIW AM and FM simulcast their programming until February 15, 1983.

WFIW carries a variety of local programming, as well as nationally syndicated shows such as Dave Ramsey, Rush Limbaugh, Clark Howard, Roger Hedgecock, Dr. Joy Browne, Coast to Coast AM, and Bill Cunningham.

== History ==
WFIW began broadcasting on August 21, 1953. The station was originally owned by Thomas Smoot Land and Bryan Davidson, doing business as Wayne County Broadcasting Company. In May 1974, Thomas Land would take sole ownership of the station, and would later pass ownership of the station to his son, Dave Land. In 2012, Land sold WFIW, along with WFIW-FM and WOKZ, to The Original Company for $962,766.67.

WFIW originally ran 500 watts during daytime hours only. On May 25, 1961, the station's power was increased to 1,000 watts. From the early to mid 1980s, the station was an affiliate of Music of Your Life. By 1986, the station was airing a modern country format. By 1989, nighttime operations were added, running 87 watts. By 1991, the station had added news-talk programming. By 1993, the station was completely airing a talk format.

The call letters WFIW were originally assigned to a station in Hopkinsville, Kentucky. In 1932, that station was bought by George Norton Jr., and its transmitter was moved to Louisville, Kentucky, with the call letters being changed to WAVE.
