= WFIW-FM =

Coordinates: 38°22′46″N 88°19′33″W

- Fairfield, Illinois; United States
- Frequency: 104.9 MHz

Programming
- Format: Adult hits

Ownership
- Owner: The Original Company, Inc.
- Sister stations: WFIW, WOKZ

History
- First air date: August 18, 1965

Technical information
- Licensing authority: FCC
- Facility ID: 71161
- Class: A
- ERP: 4,900 watts
- HAAT: 111 meters (364 ft)

Links
- Public license information: Public file; LMS
- Webcast: Listen live
- Website: wfiwradio.com

WFIW-FM 104.9 FM is a radio station broadcasting an adult hits format. Licensed to Fairfield, Illinois, the station is owned by The Original Company, Inc.

== History ==
WFIW-FM began broadcasting on August 18, 1965. The station was originally owned by Thomas Smoot Land and Bryan Davidson, doing business as Wayne County Broadcasting Company. In May 1974, Thomas Land would take sole ownership of the station, and would later pass ownership of the station to his son, Dave Land. In 2012, Land sold WFIW-FM, along with WFIW 1390 and WOKZ, to The Original Company for $962,766.67.

The station originally had an ERP of 3 kW at an HAAT of 197 feet. In 1979, its HAAT was increased to 273 ft. The station originally simulcast the programming of WFIW 1390, but on February 15, 1983, the simulcast ended, and the station began airing an adult contemporary format independent of its AM sister station. In 1985, the station had begun airing a CHR format as "I-105". By 1988, the station would return to airing an adult contemporary format. In 1993, the station's format was changed from adult contemporary to oldies. In September 1999, the station's format was changed to soft AC. In 2009, the station's format was changed to adult hits.

== Former Programming ==
WFIW as a CHR station is a former affiliate of Dan Ingram's Top 40 Satellite Survey.
