= WJBD-FM =

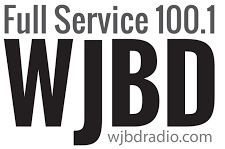
- Salem, Illinois; United States
- Frequency: 100.1 MHz
- Branding: Full service 100.1 WJBD

Programming
- Format: Full-service radio
- Affiliations: ABC

Ownership
- Owner: SCI Muitimedia, LLC; (SCI Multimedia, LLC)
- Sister stations: WSIQ

History
- First air date: July 18, 1972 (first license granted)

Technical information
- Licensing authority: FCC
- Facility ID: 70308
- Class: A
- ERP: 1.15 kilowatts
- HAAT: 137 meters (449 ft)

Links
- Public license information: Public file; LMS
- Website: www.southernillinoisnow.com

WJBD-FM is a radio station broadcasting on the frequency of 100.1 MHz and licensed to the city of Salem, Illinois. The format is Full-service radio and is known as Full Service 100.1 WJBD.

WJBD-FM was owned and operated by NRG Media, through licensee NRG License Sub, LLC. It was purchased by long-time manager Bruce Kropp in 2024.
