= WSMI-FM =

Coordinates: 39.2558816°N 89.6134243°W

- Litchfield, Illinois; United States
- Frequency: 106.1 MHz

Programming
- Format: Country music

Ownership
- Owner: Talley Broadcasting Corporation

History
- Call sign meaning: We Serve Mid-Illinois

Technical information
- Licensing authority: FCC
- Facility ID: 64566
- Class: B
- ERP: 50,000 watts
- HAAT: 140 meters (460 ft)

Links
- Public license information: Public file; LMS
- Website: wsmiradio.com

WSMI-FM 106.1 FM is a radio station broadcasting a country music format. Licensed to Litchfield, Illinois, the station is owned by Talley Broadcasting Corporation. WSMI-FM has separate programming from WSMI (AM).
