= WYKT =

- Wilmington, Illinois; United States
- Broadcast area: Joliet, Illinois
- Frequency: 105.5 MHz
- Branding: 105.5 The Ticket

Programming
- Format: Sports radio
- Affiliations: Fox Sports Radio

Ownership
- Owner: Shaw Media
- Sister stations: WKAN, WXNU

History
- First air date: September 29, 1980; 45 years ago
- Former call signs: WLMT (1980–1982); WDND (1982–1995)
- Call sign meaning: Y kat

Technical information
- Licensing authority: FCC
- Facility ID: 36120
- Class: A
- ERP: 1,300 watts
- HAAT: 147 meters (482 ft)
- Transmitter coordinates: 41°17′11″N 88°14′23″W

Links
- Public license information: Public file; LMS
- Webcast: Listen live
- Website: www.1055theticket.com

WYKT (105.5 FM, "The Ticket") is a radio station licensed to Wilmington, Illinois. It is affiliated with Fox Sports Radio. WYKT has an effective radiated power of 1,300 watts at 147 meters height above average terrain.

== History ==
The station began broadcasting on September 29, 1980, and held the call sign WLMT. The station was originally owned by Viking Broadcasting Corporation, and had an ERP of 3 kw at an HAAT of 275 feet. WLMT initially aired a MOR format, later switching to a top 40 format. In 1982, the station was sold to DBC Broadcasting for $160,000.

On November 1, 1982, the station's call sign was changed to WDND by then-owner Donald T. Burgeson. WDND aired an adult contemporary format. In 1994, the station was sold to L.B.R. Enterprises for $257,000.

In February 1995, the station's format was changed from adult contemporary to Triple-A. In April 1995, the station's call sign was changed to WYKT. The station was branded "The Kat". In July 1995, the station picked up the WDRE Underground Network at night, while continuing to air its local Triple-A format during the day. In 1998, the station was sold to STARadio Corporation. WYKT would continue airing a Triple-A format until 2003.

On August 18, 2003, WYKT adopted an oldies format branded as "The Pickle", playing music from 1964 to 1983. In October 2007, WYKT began airing a Top 40 format and was branded as "My 105.5". "My 105.5" carried American Top 40, along with local personalities. In September 2009, the station switched to a classic rock format, and was again branded "The Kat", with the slogan "The Southland's Rock and Roll Animal". The station's format would gradually shift to active rock.

On July 10, 2014, the station's format was switched to sports, as "105.5 The Ticket". "The Ticket" was initially a CBS Sports Radio affiliate, but by 2018, it would become an affiliate of Fox Sports Radio.

In 2026, the station was sold to Shaw Media.
