= WRCV =

Coordinates: 41.825°N 89.498°W

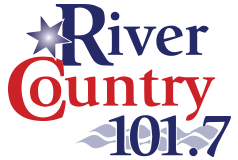
- Dixon, Illinois; United States
- Broadcast area: Dixon, Illinois
- Frequency: 101.7 MHz
- Branding: River Country 101.7

Programming
- Format: Country music

Ownership
- Owner: Shaw Media; (Shaw Family Holdings, LLC)
- Sister stations: WIXN, WSEY

History
- First air date: September 1, 1965 (as WIXN-FM)
- Former call signs: WIXN-FM (1965-2003)

Technical information
- Licensing authority: FCC
- Facility ID: 21203
- Class: A
- ERP: 6,000 Watts
- HAAT: 100 meters (330 ft)

Links
- Public license information: Public file; LMS
- Website: www.rivercountry1017.com

WRCV 101.7 FM is a radio station licensed to Dixon, Illinois, covering Northern Illinois, including Dixon, Sterling, and Rock Falls. WRCV has a country music format and is owned by Shaw Media. The station began broadcasting September 1, 1965, and held the call sign WIXN-FM. The station was originally owned by Russell G. Salter, and simulcast the programming of WIXN 1460.
