= WAJK =

Radio station in La Salle, Illinois

- La Salle, Illinois; United States
- Broadcast area: La Salle-Peru
- Frequency: 99.3 MHz
- Branding: 99.3 WAJK

Programming
- Format: Hot adult contemporary

Ownership
- Owner: John Spencer; (Starved Rock Media, Inc.)
- Sister stations: WLPO, WLWF

History
- First air date: December 4, 1964 (as WLPO-FM)
- Former call signs: WLPO-FM (1964–1979)

Technical information
- Licensing authority: FCC
- Facility ID: 36181
- Class: B1
- ERP: 11,000 watts
- HAAT: 149 meters (489 ft)
- Transmitter coordinates: 41°24′47.00″N 89°16′34.00″W

Links
- Public license information: Public file; LMS
- Webcast: Listen live
- Website: Official website

WAJK (99.3 FM) is a radio station broadcasting a hot adult contemporary format. Licensed to La Salle, Illinois, United States, the station serves a large portion of North Central Illinois from the heart of Starved Rock Country. The station is currently owned by John Spencer, through licensee Starved Rock Media, Inc., and features a variety of pop music from 2K and today. Air personalities include Brad Spelich and Jaimie London in the morning, Amber Miller afternoons, Pop Crush Nights, and Throwback2K every weekend.
