= WKAN =

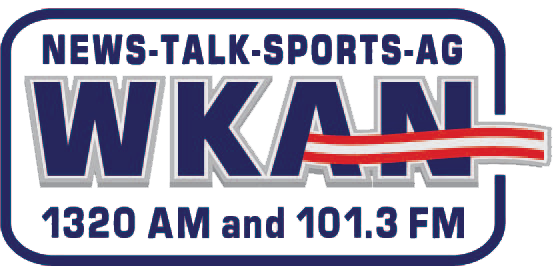
- Kankakee, Illinois; United States
- Frequency: 1320 kHz
- Branding: 1320 AM and 101.3 FM

Programming
- Format: Talk/Personality
- Affiliations: Fox News Radio; Premiere Networks; Westwood One; Illinois News Network

Ownership
- Owner: Shaw Media
- Sister stations: WXNU, WYKT

History
- First air date: 1947
- Call sign meaning: Kankakee

Technical information
- Licensing authority: FCC
- Facility ID: 62359
- Class: B
- Power: 1,000 watts day 500 watts night
- Transmitter coordinates: 41°8′8.00″N 87°49′10.00″W
- Translator: see below

Links
- Public license information: Public file; LMS
- Webcast: Listen Live
- Website: wkan.com

WKAN (1320 AM) is a radio station broadcasting a Talk/Personality format. Licensed to Kankakee, Illinois, United States. Founded in 1947, WKAN is Kankakee County's heritage station. The station is currently owned by Shaw Media and features programming from Fox News Radio, Premiere Networks and Westwood One.

== FM Translator ==
In addition to the main station at 1320 kHz, WKAN is relayed by an FM translator which provides improved sound and coverage.

Broadcast translator for WKAN
Call sign	Frequency	City of license	FID	ERP (W)	Class	FCC info
W267CI	101.3 FM	Kankakee, Illinois	156887	250	D	LMS

== Programming ==
WKAN broadcasts a local morning show, The Morning Roundtable hosted by Joshua Carman, weekdays 7-9 am. WKAN also broadcasts several network shows such as Glenn Beck, Dave Ramsey, Sean Hannity, Mark Levin, and Jim Bohannon. Local news is covered by Jared Cerullo. Other news is provided by Fox News Radio and Illinois News Network.

WKAN previous logo
