= Northwest Herald =

Daily newspaper published in Crystal Lake, Illinois, USA

- Type: Daily newspaper
- Format: Tabloid
- Owner: Shaw Media
- Publisher: John Rung
- Editor: Diana Wallace
- Founded: 1985
- Headquarters: 7717 S. Route 31; Crystal Lake, IL 60014; United States
- Website: shawlocal.com/northwest-herald

The Northwest Herald is a daily tabloid newspaper published in Crystal Lake, Illinois. The paper serves the northwest suburbs of Chicago, including all of McHenry County and northern Kane County. Its main competition is the Daily Herald.

The Northwest Herald is the flagship title of Shaw Media, whose corporate headquarters are shared with the paper's offices.

== History ==
Shaw Newspapers first entered McHenry County in 1948, when it bought the Woodstock Sentinel. It bought several more McHenry County outlets over the next three decades.

In 1983, Shaw Newspapers acquired the Cardunal Free Press, making it the owner of every newspaper based in McHenry County. At the time, these titles were mostly weeklies and small dailies, some with more than 150 years of service to their communities. In 1985, Shaw merged the McHenry County papers into the Northwest Herald, a daily and Saturday newspaper serving all of McHenry County.

On March 12, 1989, the Northwest Herald added a Sunday edition and became McHenry County's first hometown, seven-day newspaper. It had a daily circulation of 29,688 and its new Sunday edition had 29,337 subscribers, which dropped to 21,440 in 2017.

The paper was redesigned for the first time in 1992, with stock quotes added to the Business section and more space and sources for wire stories in the Front section. A Friday entertainment section in tabloid form named Sidetracks was added, as was a Saturday Neighbors section devoted entirely to readers' submissions.

Beginning in 1992, four different Northwest Herald front pages were printed each weekday. The practice, called zoning, ensured that readers would have the most local news product available to them on the front page of their paper. Zoning of the newspaper eventually would be expanded to seven editions in 2002, but was discontinued in February 2004.

After five years as a seven-day paper, the Northwest Herald won its first award for excellence from the Illinois Press Association in 1994. It has won IPA's Sweepstakes award, the Mabel Shaw Trophy (named after one of the founders of Shaw Media), six of the past eight years.
