= Urbana, Illinois =

City in Illinois, United States

- City
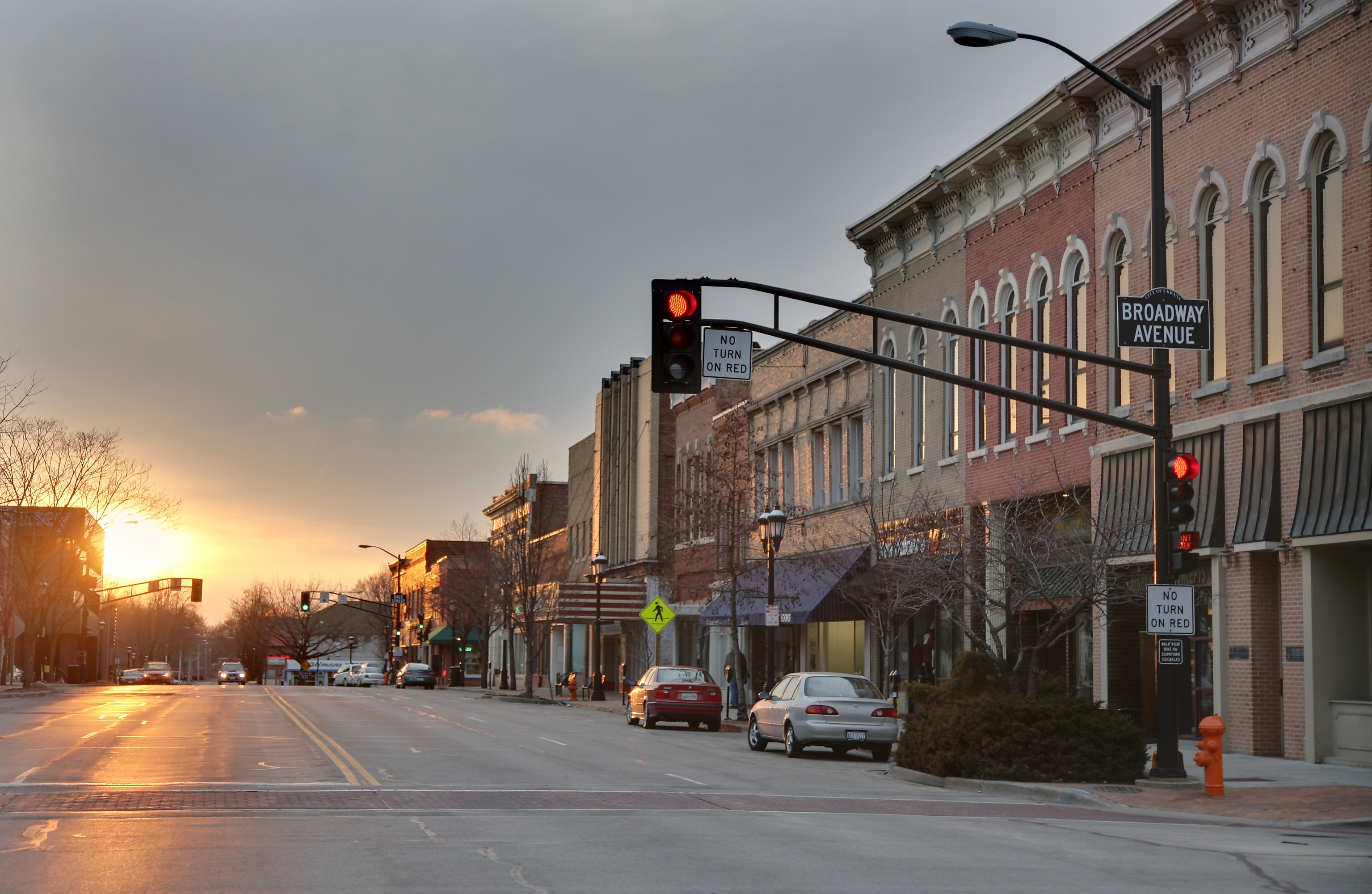
- Downtown Urbana

- Logo
- Interactive map of Urbana, Illinois
- Location within Illinois Location within the United States
- Coordinates: 40°06′38″N 88°11′50″W
- Country: United States
- State: Illinois
- County: Champaign
- Township: Cunningham
- Founded: 1833
- Named for: Urbana, Ohio, US

Government
  - Type: Mayor–council
  - Mayor: DeShawn Williams (D)

Area
  - City: 11.90 sq mi (30.83 km^{2})
  - Land: 11.83 sq mi (30.64 km^{2})
  - Water: 0.073 sq mi (0.19 km^{2})
- Elevation: 732 ft (223 m)

Population (2020)
  - City: 38,336
  - Density: 3,240.5/sq mi (1,251.15/km^{2})
  - Metro: 236,072
- Time zone: UTC−6 (CST)
  - Summer (DST): UTC−5 (CDT)
- Postal code: 61801–61803
- Area codes: 217, 447
- FIPS code: 17-77005
- GNIS ID: 2397097
- Website: www.urbanail.gov

Urbana (/ɜːrˈbænə/) is a city in Champaign County, Illinois, United States, and its county seat. As of the 2020 census, Urbana had a population of 38,336. It is a principal city of the Champaign–Urbana metropolitan area, which had about 236,000 residents in 2020. Urbana is notable for sharing the main campus of the University of Illinois with its twin city of Champaign.

== History ==
The Urbana area was first settled by Europeans in 1822, when it was called "Big Grove". When the county of Champaign was organized in 1833, the county seat was located on 40 acres of land, 20 acres donated by William T. Webber and 20 acres by M. W. Busey, considered to be the city's founder, and the name "Urbana" was adopted after Urbana, Ohio, the hometown of State Senator John W. Vance, who authored the enabling act creating Champaign County. The creation of the new town was celebrated for the first time on July 4, 1833.

Stores began opening in 1834. The first mills were founded in c. 1838-50. The town's first church, the Methodist Episcopal Church, and the parsonage, was built in 1840 by the Rev. A. Bradshaw, with the Baptist Church following in 1855. The Presbyterian Church was founded in 1856. The city's first school was built in 1854.

Urbana suffered a setback when the Chicago branch of the Illinois Central Railroad, which had been expected to pass through town, was instead laid down two miles west, where the land was flatter. The town of West Urbana grew up around the train depot built there in 1854; further, in 1861, its name was changed to Champaign. The competition between the two cities provoked Urbana to tear down the 10-year-old county courthouse and replace it with a much larger and fancier structure, to ensure that the county seat would remain in Urbana.

Champaign-Urbana was selected as the site for a new state agricultural school, thanks to the efforts of Clark Griggs. Illinois Industrial University, which evolved into the University of Illinois Urbana-Champaign, opened in 1868 with 77 students.

A number of efforts to merge Urbana and Champaign have failed at the polls.

On October 9, 1871, a fire burned much of downtown Urbana. Children playing with matches started the fire. (It is unrelated to the Great Chicago Fire that started the day before, though both fires occurred during severe drought and were spread by high winds.)

== Geography ==
According to the 2021 census gazetteer files, Urbana has a total area of 11.90 square miles (30.82 km^{2}), of which 0.07 sq mi (0.18 km^{2}) (or 0.60%) is covered by water.

Urbana borders the city of Champaign. The main campus of the University of Illinois Urbana-Champaign is situated on this border. Together, these two cities are often referred to as Urbana-Champaign (the designation used by the university) or Champaign-Urbana (the more common usage, due to the larger size of Champaign). With the nearby village of Savoy, they form the Champaign–Urbana metropolitan area.

Climate data for Urbana, Illinois (1981–2010 normals)
Month	Jan	Feb	Mar	Apr	May	Jun	Jul	Aug	Sep	Oct	Nov	Dec	Year
Record high °F (°C)	70 (21)	72 (22)	85 (29)	95 (35)	97 (36)	103 (39)	109 (43)	102 (39)	102 (39)	93 (34)	80 (27)	71 (22)	109 (43)
Mean daily maximum °F (°C)	32.9 (0.5)	37.7 (3.2)	49.9 (9.9)	62.8 (17.1)	73.4 (23.0)	82.5 (28.1)	85.0 (29.4)	83.7 (28.7)	78.2 (25.7)	65.2 (18.4)	50.6 (10.3)	36.7 (2.6)	61.7 (16.5)
Mean daily minimum °F (°C)	16.7 (−8.5)	20.2 (−6.6)	30.0 (−1.1)	41.1 (5.1)	51.6 (10.9)	61.9 (16.6)	64.9 (18.3)	63.1 (17.3)	54.2 (12.3)	42.6 (5.9)	32.0 (0.0)	21.2 (−6.0)	41.7 (5.4)
Record low °F (°C)	−25 (−32)	−25 (−32)	−5 (−21)	15 (−9)	26 (−3)	34 (1)	41 (5)	37 (3)	24 (−4)	12 (−11)	−5 (−21)	−20 (−29)	−25 (−32)
Average precipitation inches (mm)	2.02 (51)	2.13 (54)	2.85 (72)	3.68 (93)	4.89 (124)	4.28 (109)	4.70 (119)	3.93 (100)	3.13 (80)	3.26 (83)	3.66 (93)	2.73 (69)	41.25 (1,048)
Average snowfall inches (cm)	7.0 (18)	6.0 (15)	2.4 (6.1)	0.4 (1.0)	0 (0)	0 (0)	0 (0)	0 (0)	0 (0)	0.1 (0.25)	0.8 (2.0)	6.4 (16)	23.3 (59)
Average precipitation days (≥ 0.01 in)	9.3	8.9	10.6	11.9	12.2	10.3	10.0	9.4	7.7	9.5	10.2	10.6	120.6
Average snowy days (≥ 0.1 in)	5.3	4.1	2.2	0.3	0	0	0	0	0	0.1	1.0	5.0	18.1
Source: NOAA (extremes 1888–present)

== Demographics ==
Historical population
Census	Pop.	Note	%±
1850	210		—
1860	1,370		552.4%
1870	2,277		66.2%
1880	2,942		29.2%
1890	3,511		19.3%
1900	5,728		63.1%
1910	8,245		43.9%
1920	10,244		24.2%
1930	13,060		27.5%
1940	14,064		7.7%
1950	22,834		62.4%
1960	27,294		19.5%
1970	33,976		24.5%
1980	35,978		5.9%
1990	36,344		1.0%
2000	36,395		0.1%
2010	41,250		13.3%
2020	38,336		−7.1%
U.S. Decennial Census

=== Racial and ethnic composition ===
Urbana city, Illinois – Racial and ethnic composition Note: the US Census treats Hispanic/Latino as an ethnic category. This table excludes Latinos from the racial categories and assigns them to a separate category. Hispanics/Latinos may be of any race.
Race / Ethnicity (NH = Non-Hispanic)	Pop 2000	Pop 2010	Pop 2020	% 2000	% 2010	% 2020
White alone (NH)	23,811	23,809	18,848	65.42%	57.72%	49.17%
Black or African American alone (NH)	5,181	6,651	7,112	14.24%	16.12%	18.55%
Native American or Alaska Native alone (NH)	49	59	54	0.13%	0.14%	0.14%
Asian alone (NH)	5,169	7,305	6,985	14.20%	17.71%	18.22%
Pacific Islander alone (NH)	10	57	13	0.03%	0.14%	0.03%
Other race alone (NH)	109	134	172	0.30%	0.32%	0.45%
Multiracial (NH)	778	1,070	1,884	2.14%	2.59%	4.91%
Hispanic or Latino (any race)	1,288	2,165	3,268	3.54%	5.25%	8.52%
Total	36,395	41,250	38,336	100.00%	100.00%	100.00%

=== 2020 census ===
As of the 2020 census, Urbana had a population of 38,336, with 16,075 households and 6,680 families residing in the city. The population density was 3,220.97 inhabitants per square mile (1,243.62/km^{2}).

The median age was 27.2 years; 13.6% of residents were under 18 and 11.8% were 65 or older. For every 100 females, there were 101.6 males, and for every 100 females 18 and over, there were 100.6 males 18 and over.

All of the residents lived in urban areas, while none lived in rural areas.

Of the 16,075 households in Urbana, 17.7% had children under 18 living in them, 26.3% were married-couple households, 31.6% were households with a male householder and no spouse or partner present, and 35.3% were households with a female householder and no spouse or partner present. About 42.4% of all households were made up of individuals, and 9.6% had someone living alone who was 65 or older.

Racial composition as of the 2020 census
Race	Number	Percent
White	19,784	51.6%
Black or African American	7,229	18.9%
American Indian and Alaska Native	116	0.3%
Asian	7,002	18.3%
Native Hawaiian and other Pacific Islander	13	0.0%
Some other race	1,367	3.6%
Two or more races	2,825	7.4%
Hispanic or Latino (of any race)	3,268	8.5%

== Housing ==
The 2020 census counted 18,321 housing units in Urbana, with an average density of 1,539.32 per square mile (594.33/km^{2}). The 2020–2024 American Community Survey estimated 19,228 housing units, consisting of 10,569 renter-occupied units, 6,287 owner-occupied units, and 2,372 vacant units.

College towns commonly have rental-oriented housing markets. In Urbana, the city reports more than 10,000 rental units, comprising nearly two-thirds of its housing stock.

Estimates of housing vacancy vary according to their source, definition, and methodology. In a July 2026 presentation to the Urbana City Council, city staff and the Champaign County Regional Planning Commission presented preliminary landlord-survey results indicating a rental vacancy rate between 1.3% and 5.5%. Written materials accompanying the presentation noted that disruptions associated with the COVID-19 pandemic limited the accuracy of Urbana's 2020 census data. They also stated that the American Community Survey estimates did not fully account for the city's 2025 special census and that local and non-Census sources were being used to provide context for federal data.

Census classifications of vacant housing are broader than the number of homes available to prospective tenants and can include units that have been rented or sold but are not yet occupied, seasonal units, and units otherwise unavailable to the rental market. A contemporaneous study in neighboring Champaign found a rental vacancy rate of 1.5% in its landlord survey and a residential vacancy rate of 1.8% in United States Postal Service data. It used a rate closer to 2% for its housing-demand projections.

== Arts and culture ==
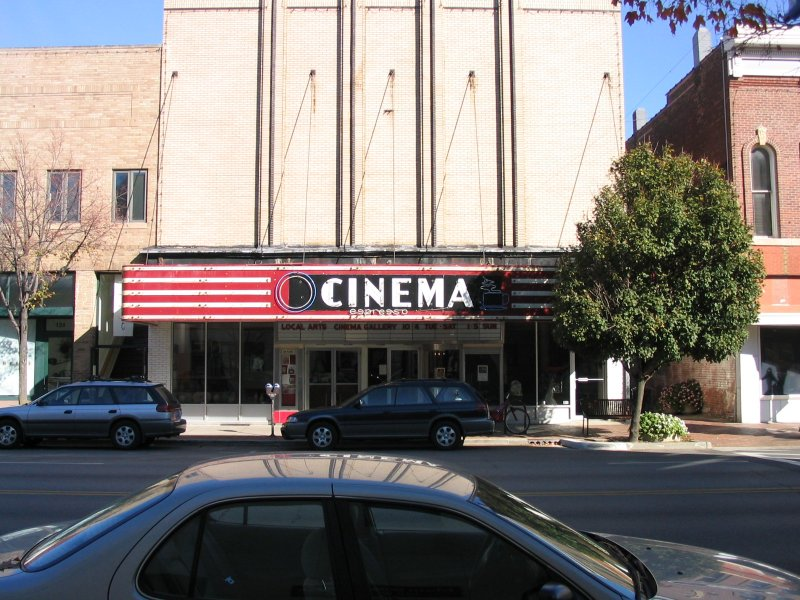
The Cinema Gallery in downtown Urbana

=== Candlestick Lane ===
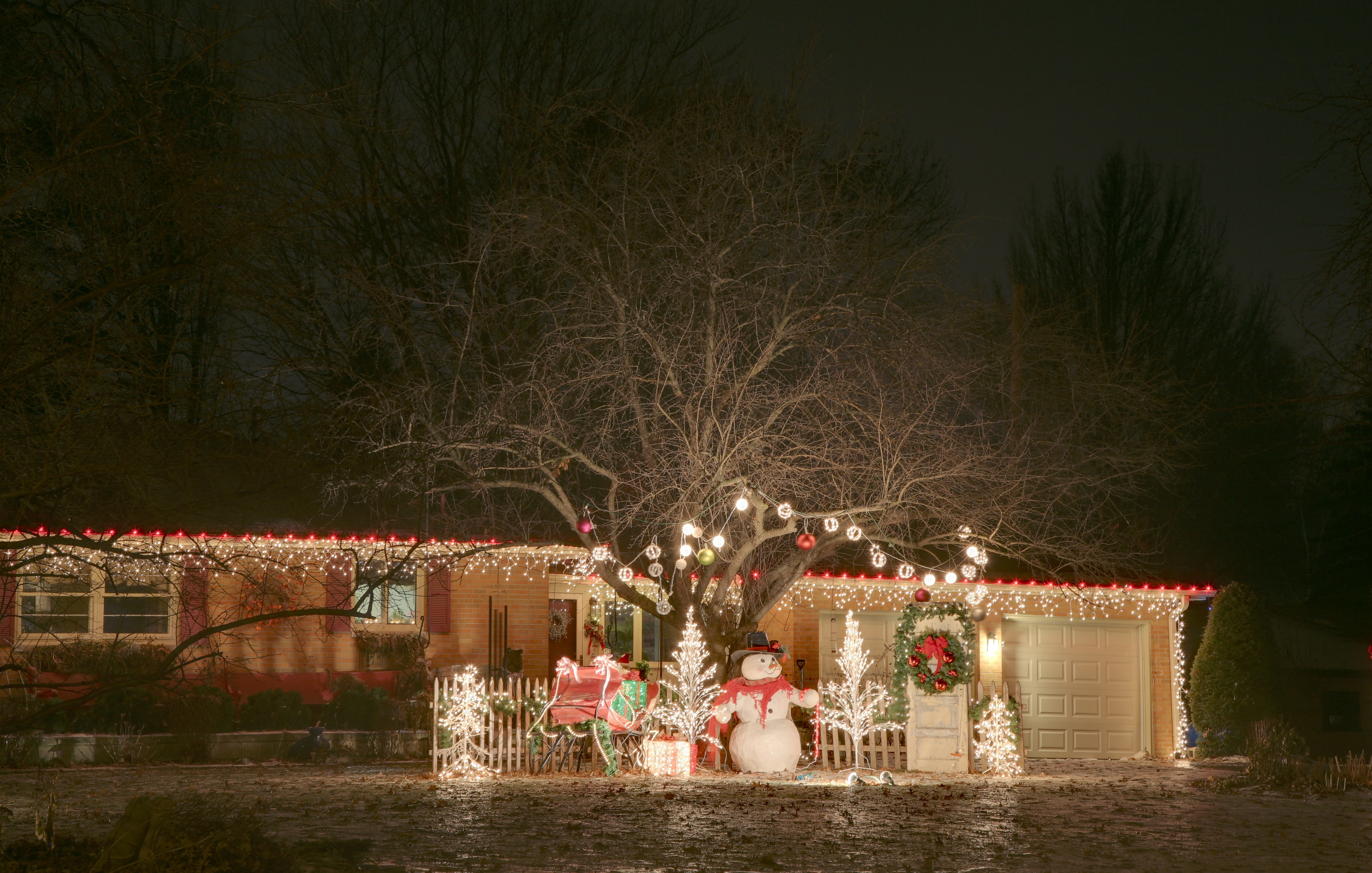
A house on Candlestick Lane colorfully decorated for Christmas

Candlestick Lane is the name of a neighborhood in eastern Urbana. This neighborhood consists of Grant Place and adjacent properties on Fairlawn and Eastern Drives. It is called Candlestick Lane because every year, the residents decorate their yards for Christmas with lights and figures. The tradition began around 1961 as a house-decorating contest sponsored by the Illinois Power Company. The neighborhood used its prize money to purchase electric candlesticks for each home. The City of Urbana installs special red and green street signs, reading "Candlestick Lane" and "Grant Place" during the holiday season. The lights are turned on from around 5:00 to 10:00 pm from the third Saturday in December through New Year's Day.

=== Market at the Square ===
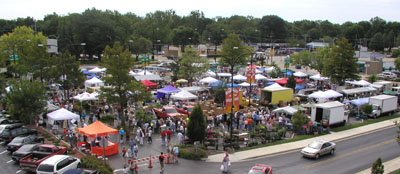
Market at the Square

The Market at the Square, also known as the Farmers' Market, has been a community event in Urbana since 1979. Every Saturday morning from sometime in May to sometime in November, dozens of vendors set up shop in the Lincoln Square parking lot in downtown Urbana. They primarily sell local produce (including corn, tomatoes, lettuce, and watermelons), but one can also find local crafts, music, kettle corn, and booths for various community and political organizations.

=== Urbana Sweetcorn Festival ===
The Urbana Sweetcorn Festival was an annual festival in Urbana, first held in August 1975 in the Busey Bank parking lot in downtown Urbana. It was a community event put on by employees of Busey Bank. Since then, the Sweetcorn Festival continued to grow. The Urbana Business Association was responsible for the planning of the festival, over the years adding a local car show, an expanded family area, live music on multiple stages, food, vendors, beer, in the heart of downtown Urbana.

In addition to corn and beverages, the festival offered a range of activities and events, including a display of antique and other collectors' cars and volksmarches, arts events, a dog show, and a book sale organized by the Friends of the Urbana Free Library.

In 2021, The Urbana Business Association closed due to COVID-19 and a lack of funding. The last Urbana Sweetcorn Festival was held in 2019, and currently no plans have been made for the city or another organization to plan the festival in future years.

=== Urbana Lincoln Hotel ===
The Urbana Lincoln Hotel is connected to Lincoln Square Mall, an indoor walking mall, in the center of Urbana. The hotel was designed by famed Urbana architect Joseph Royer in 1923 and opened several rooms on November 1, 1923, to accommodate guests for the university's homecoming game. The original building was built in the Tudor Revival style. A convention center was added in the 1970s in the Bavarian style. While being forced to close twice between 1990 and 2009, the hotel was purchased by a private developer in 2010 and underwent major rehabilitation. The hotel opened under new management and with a new name, Urbana Landmark Hotel, on December 1, 2012, but it closed in July 2015 and sold January 2020 for redevelopment as a Hilton Tapestry hotel.

=== Points of interest ===
- American Football House
- University of Illinois Arboretum
- University of Illinois Conservatory and Plant Collection
- Krannert Center for the Performing Arts
- Spurlock Museum
- Station Theatre

== Parks and recreation ==
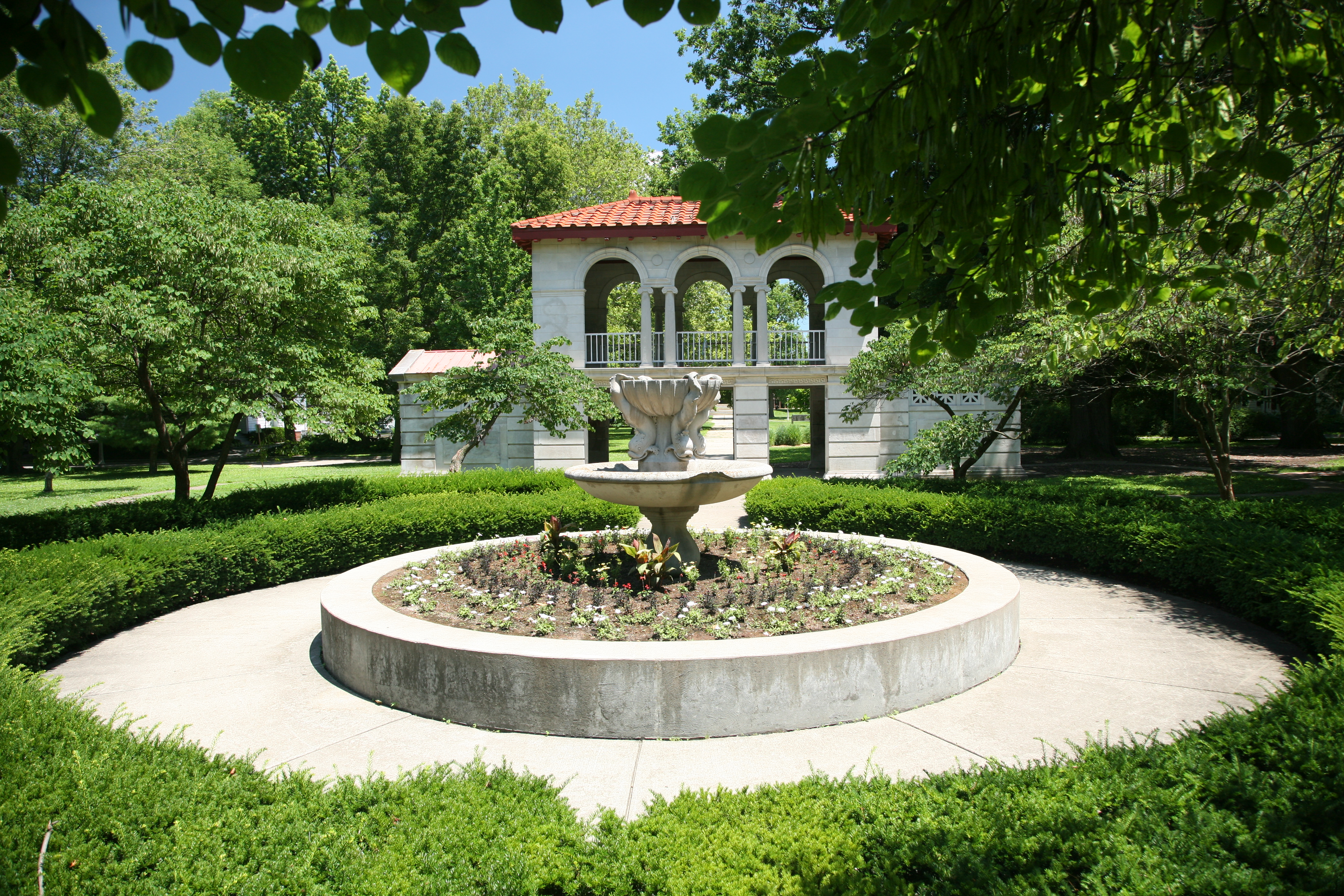
Carle Park

Carle Park, established in 1909, is located at Indiana and Garfield, just west of Urbana High School in central Urbana. Measuring 8.3 acres (34,000 m^{2}), it contains a statue entitled Lincoln the Lawyer by Lorado Taft and more than 50 well-established trees that are part of the Hickman Tree Walk. The Lincoln statue was previously sited in front of the Urbana Lincoln Hotel, but was moved after only a few months.

Meadowbrook Park is located southeast of the Race Street and Windsor Road intersection. The park covers 130 acres (0.53 km^{2}), including 80 of recreated Illinois tallgrass prairie. The area on which the park is currently located was formerly a farm, which was acquired by the Park District in 1967. Beginning in 1977, areas of the property underwent ecological restoration to tallgrass prairie, wetland, floodplains, and woods. There are more than 3 miles of paved and 2 miles of unpaved trails through the park and its restored natural areas. Several small hills make the path unsuitable for inexperienced inline skaters. The path is adorned with about 20 large sculptures from local artists. A playground, shelter, and parking lot are located near the Windsor Road entrance. A community garden, an herbal garden, the Timpone Ornamental Tree Grove, and a shelter are located near the Race Street entrance. The park also contains many streams, which are among the first tributaries of the Embarras River.

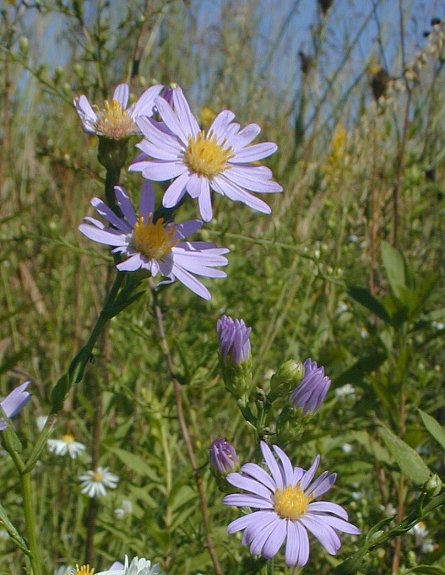
This blooming Smooth Blue Aster was among those species seeded in Meadowbrook Park during its original restoration. It is persisting in the park as of 2011.

In 2011, the Urbana Park District contracted with John White to survey the vascular flora of Meadowbrook Park. This survey found 608 species of plants growing in the park, 371 of those being native to the East-Central Illinois region, including some rare and sensitive species. Among those were 59 species of invasive plants; White noted that there were severe infestations of Amur Honeysuckle, Reed Canary Grass, and the native forb Tall Goldenrod. These invasive species are still being managed by the Urbana Park District in collaboration with members of the public, in the form of volunteer environmental stewardship programs. Employees of the Urbana Park District also conduct controlled burns in Meadowbrook Park.

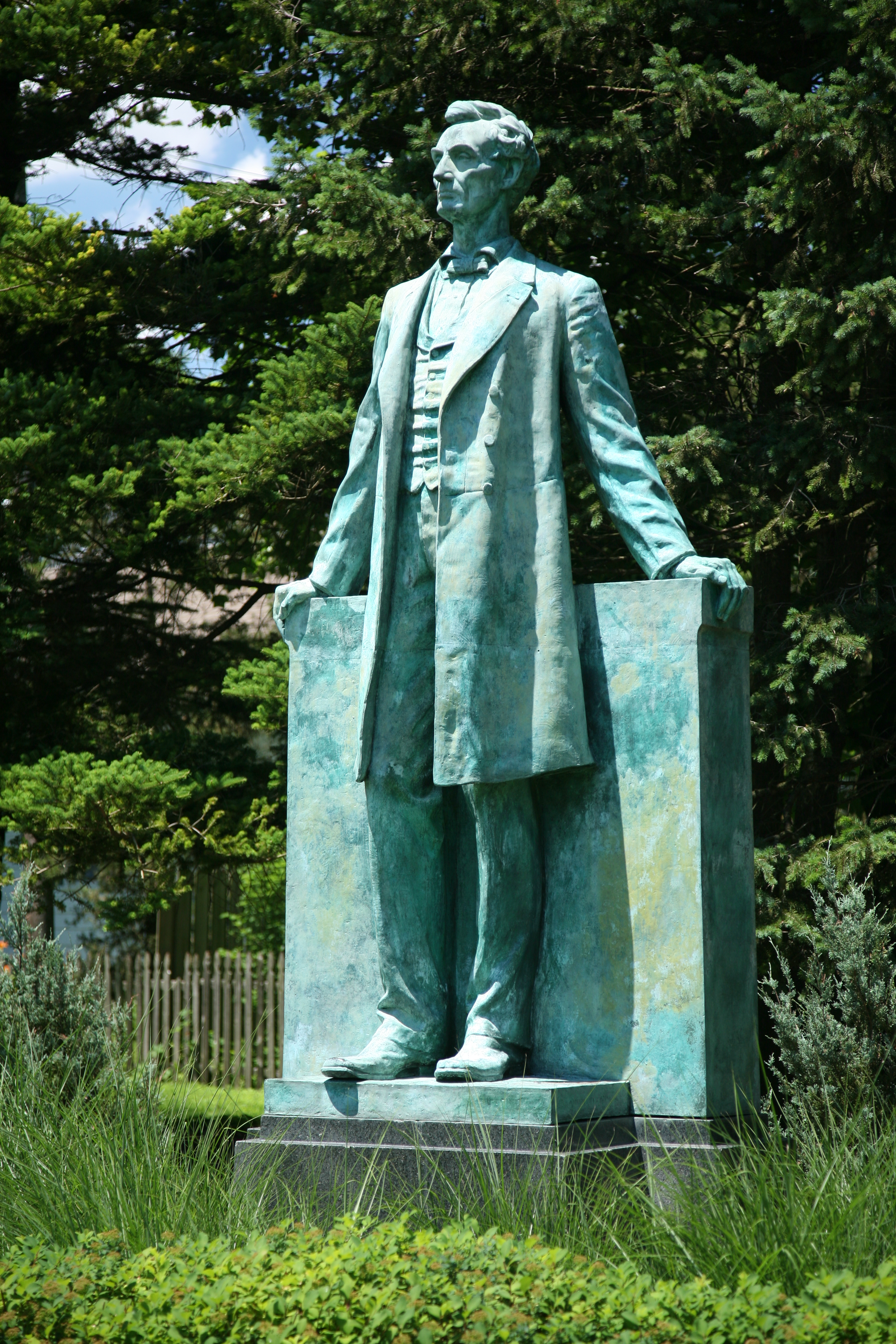
Lincoln the Lawyer by Lorado Taft

The Urbana Dog Park, located on East Perkins Road, is a place to walk a dog without a leash. Adjacent to the Dog Park but closed to the public is the Perkins Road Site, which is currently undergoing environmental rehabilitation and improvements to its trails in anticipation of its later opening to the public.

The Anita Purves Nature Center, located on the north end of Crystal Lake Park and to the east of Busey Woods, offers nature education programs.

The "Art in the Park", just north of the Urbana City Hall (400 S. Vine St.), dedicated in October 2012, took 22 years of struggle and efforts of three mayors. The environmental and sculptural artists/curator of the park, John David Mooney, designed the plantings, walkways, a 12-foot-high fountain sculpture (Falling Leaf), and a 33-foot-high light sculpture (Spirit Tree). The Spirit Tree specifically gives new meaning to Urbana's designation as a "Tree City" and to trees as landmarks or beacons. Mooney, an internationally acclaimed artist, is a native of Champaign-Urbana.

=== Swimming pools ===
The Urbana Indoor Aquatic Center is a public indoor pool operated by the Urbana Park District and Urbana School District. It is located between Urbana High School and Urbana Middle School.

Crystal Lake Pool is a public outdoor pool. It is located on Broadway Street, across from the Anita Purves Nature Center. It was closed after the summer 2008 season due to deteriorating conditions and concomitant safety issues; it was rebuilt and reopened in 2013.

Campus Recreation Center East has an indoor leisure pool with a hot tub. It is owned by the University of Illinois Urbana–Champaign. In Urbana, the pools in Freer Hall, formerly a 25-yard and six-lane lap pool, and Kenney Gym have been closed and filled, the former redeveloped as research and teaching spaces.

== Sports ==
=== Illinois Fighting Illini ===
The University of Illinois Urbana-Champaign fields 10 men's and 11 women's varsity sports.

=== Minor league ===
Urbana has been home to several separate minor league baseball clubs in conjunction with Champaign. The Champaign-Urbana Velvets played in the Illinois–Missouri League from 1911 until the league disbanded after 1914. The city's most recent minor league team was the Champaign-Urbana Bandits, who played during the single 1994 season of the Great Central League. The Bandits played at Illinois Field. Prior to holding postseason play, the league folded. The Champaign-Urbana Colts played in the Central Illinois Collegiate League from 1990 until the team folded in 1996.

== Government ==
Urbana has mayor–council government, of the strong-mayor form. The city council has seven members, each elected from a different ward. The mayor is elected in a citywide vote.

== Education ==
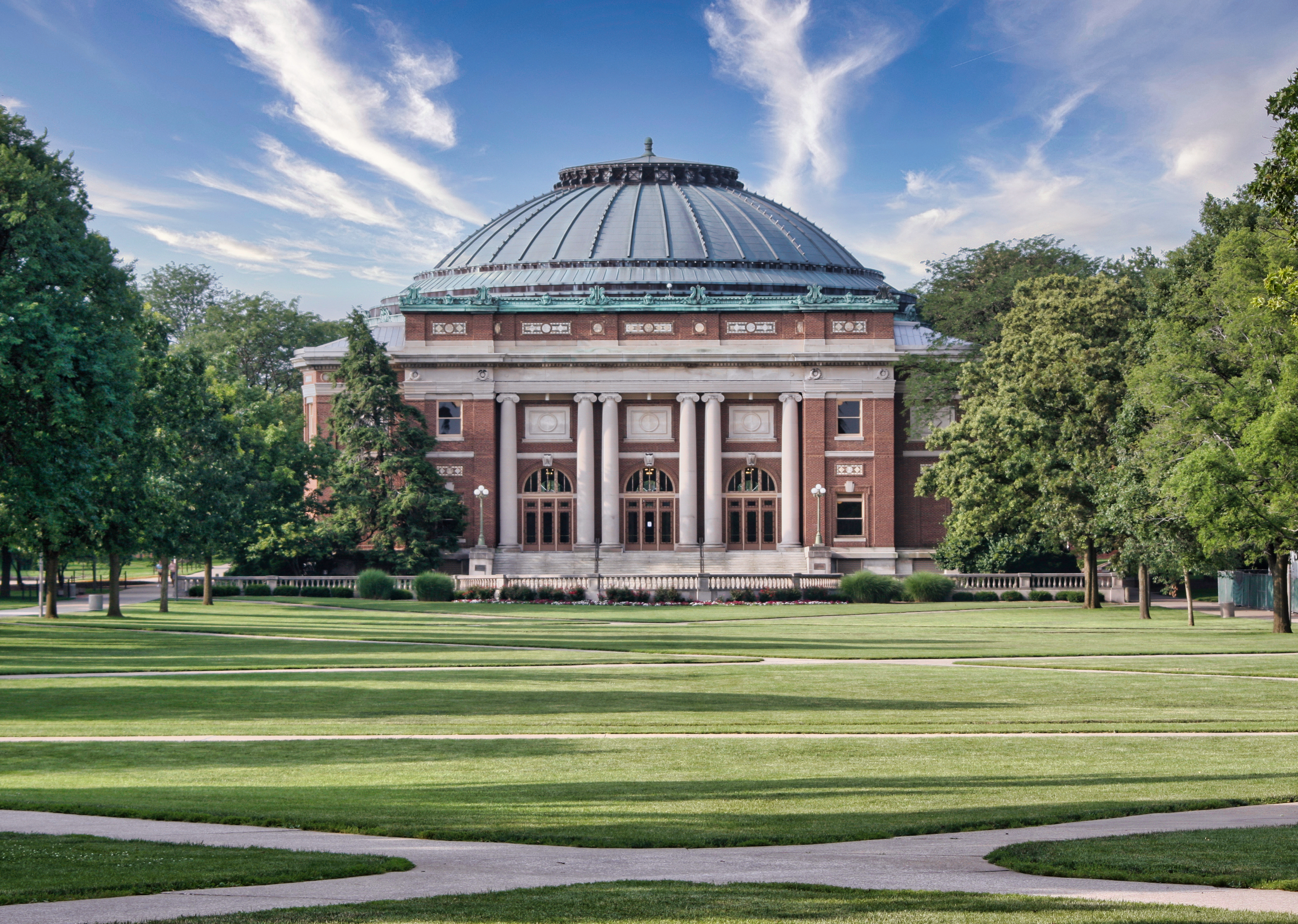
Foellinger Auditorium at the University of Illinois Urbana-Champaign

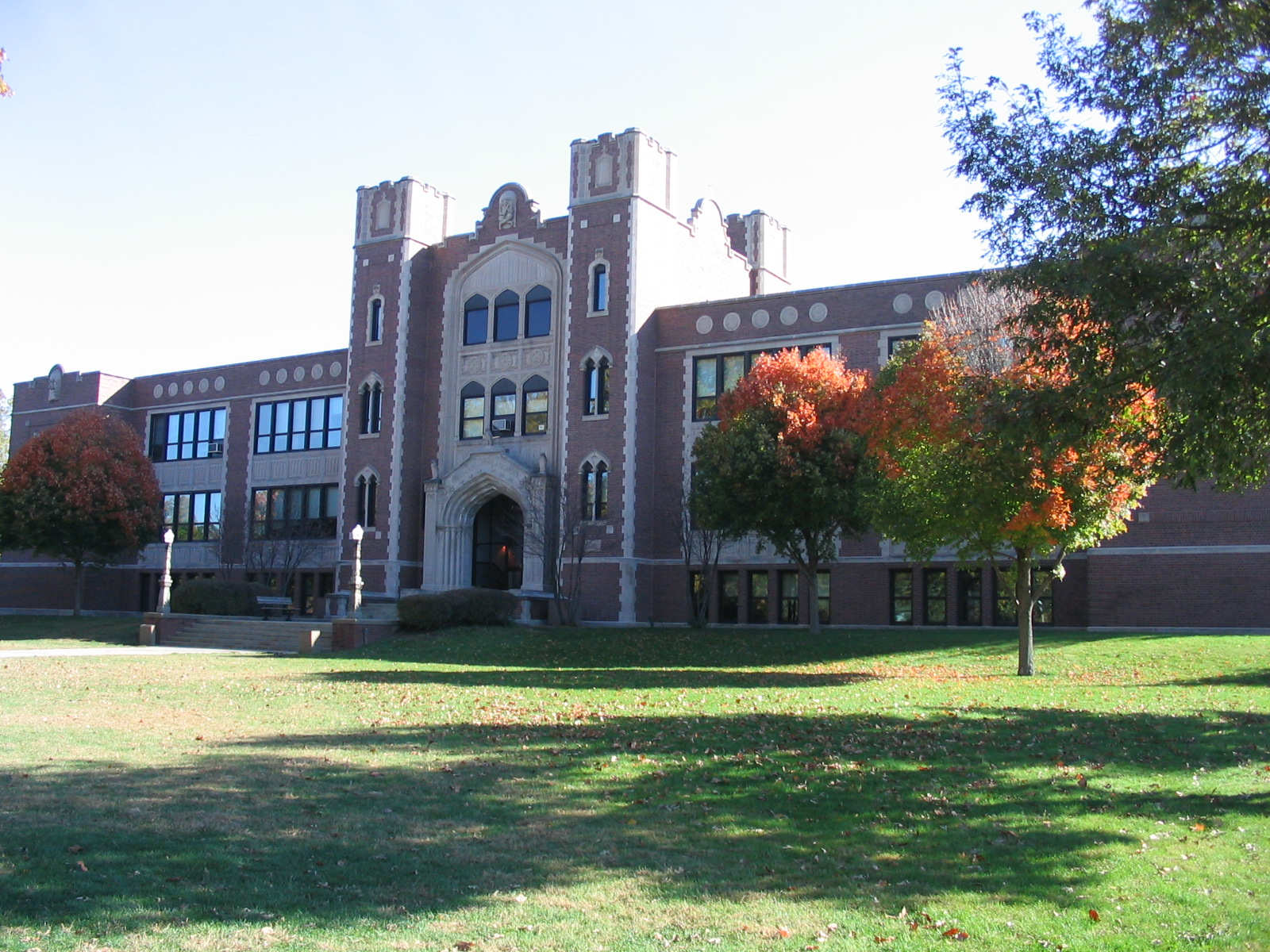
Urbana High School in 2003

=== Primary and secondary ===
Urbana High School's current building was built in 1914. It was designed by architect Joseph Royer, who also designed many other area buildings, such as the Urbana Free Library and the Champaign County Court House. The architecture is of the Tudor style defined primarily by the towers over the main entrance and flattened point arches over the doors.

Not part of the Urbana School District, University Laboratory High School, locally known as Uni High, is a publicly funded laboratory school located on the campus of the University of Illinois in Urbana. Founded in 1921, it is a research project of the University of Illinois College of Education.

Urbana Middle School was first known as Urbana Junior High School in 1953. In 2003, the school was renovated for space. As of 2024, the school serves 897 students from grades 6 to 8.

The elementary schools in Urbana are Leal, Dr. Martin Luther King Jr., Dr. Preston L. Williams Jr., Thomas Paine, and Yankee Ridge. Urbana Early Childhood School, the former Washington Early Childhood Center, is located on the Prairie Campus next to Dr. Preston L. Williams Elementary.

=== Colleges and universities ===
Most of the University of Illinois Urbana-Champaign campus lies in this city. It is a public land-grant research university and the flagship institution of the University of Illinois system. It is one of the largest public universities by enrollment in the United States, with over 50,000 students enrolled annually, giving Urbana a large student population throughout the year.

=== Urbana Free Library ===
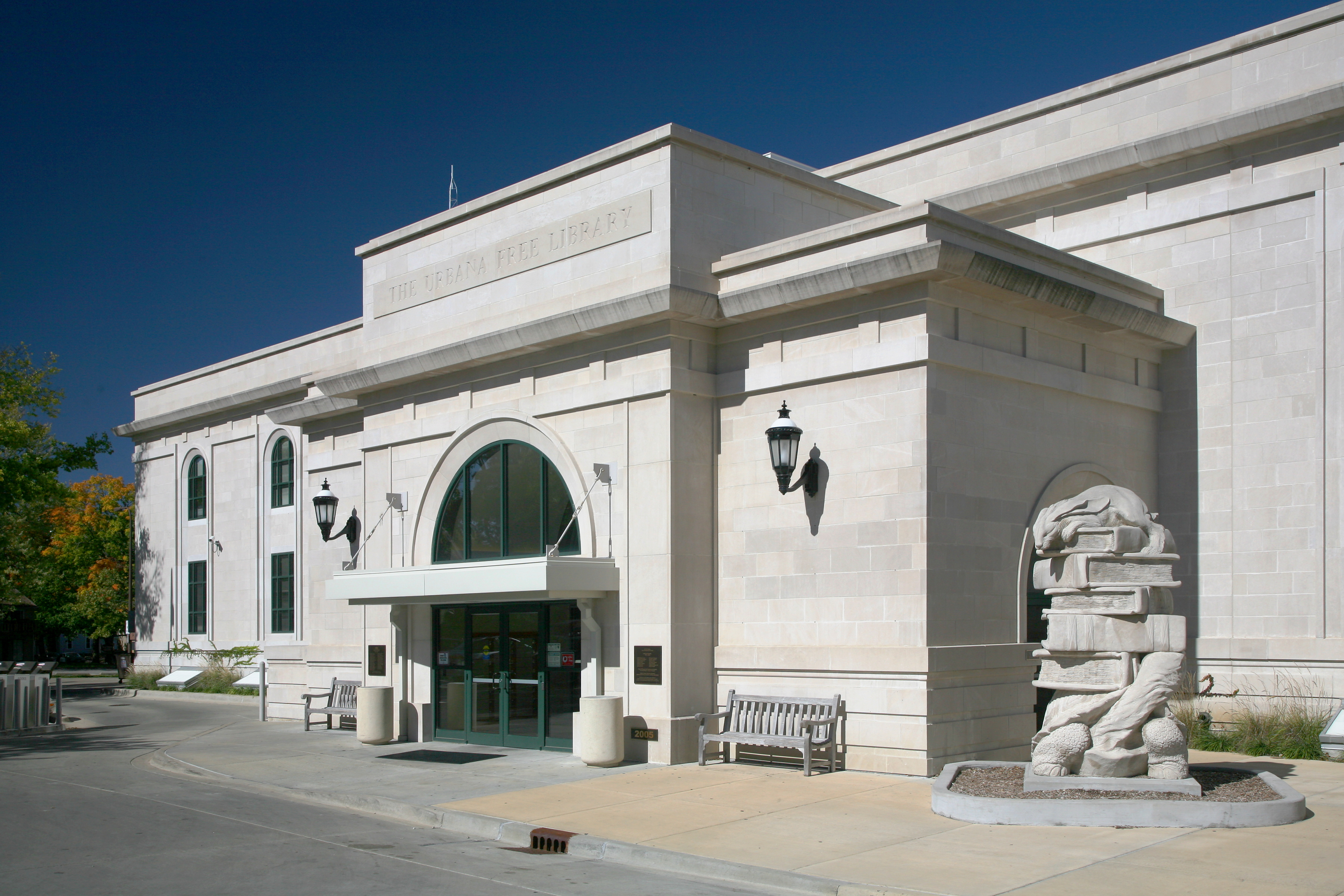
Urbana Free Library in 2008

The Urbana Free Library, one of the first public libraries in Illinois, was founded in 1874 and is located in the downtown area. The historic building which houses the library was built in 1918. A major new addition was opened in 2005.

The library houses historical archives of Champaign County, which can be used for genealogical research. Established in 1956, the Champaign County Historical Archives is a department of the Urbana Free Library that maintains a research-level collection on the history and genealogy of Champaign County. In 1987 it was designated the official repository for non-current Champaign County records. Although it focuses on Champaign County, the Archives holds extensive collections of works dealing with the rest of Illinois and those states that document the significant migration routes of the communities that comprise Champaign County. The CCHA is also home to the Local History Online database. Local History Online gives access to holdings (books and journals, Champaign County records, City of Urbana municipal records, newspapers, directories, school yearbooks, images, maps, oral histories, local organization newsletters, and other special collections) of the Champaign County Historical Archives, including digital content. The catalog is frequently updated.

The library is publicly funded and receives additional support from about 600 people who have joined the Friends of the Urbana Free Library.

== Media ==
FM radio

- 88.1 W201CK (Translates 90.7 KHRI) "Air 1", Christian CHR
- 88.7 WPCD, College radio
- 89.3 WGNJ, Religious
- 90.1 WEFT, Community Radio, Variety
- 90.9 WILL-FM, Classical music, Public Radio, (RDS), broadcasting from Urbana
- 91.7 WBGL, Christian AC (RDS)
- 92.5 WREE "Rewind 92.5", Classic Hits (RDS – Artist/Title)
- 93.5 WSJK "ESPN Radio" Sports (RDS)
- 94.5 WLRW "Mix 94.5" Hot AC (RDS – Artist/Title) (HD Radio)
- 95.3 WJEK "Sunny 95.3" Adult contemporary (RDS)
- 96.1 WQQB "Q 96", CHR/Pop (RDS)
- 97.5 WHMS-FM "Lite Rock 97.5" Adult Contemporary
- 99.1 WYXY "Extra 99.1" Rock (RDS – Artist/Title)
- 99.7 WQQB "Hits 99.7" Popular and hip hop
- 100.3 WIXY "WIXY 100.3" Country (RDS – Artist/Title)
- 100.9 WHPO "100.9 WHPO" Country
- 101.1 W266AF (Translates 90.9 WILL-FM HD2), 24-hour Classical music
- 102.5 WGNN, Religious
- 103.9 W280DE (Translates 102.5 WGNN), Religious
- 104.5 WRFU-LP "Radio Free Urbana", Community/Political Activism (Low-power 100 watts FM)
- 105.5 WKIO "105.5 WKIO" ClaWS-FMssic rock
- 105.9 WGKC "Classic Rock 105.9 WGKC" Classic Rock
- 107.1 WPGU College Radio Alternative
- 107.9 WDWS-FM "107.9 The Rooster" Country

AM radio

- 580 WILL, Public Radio, broadcasting from Urbana
- 1400 WDWS, News/Talk (AM Stereo)
- 1460 WJCI, Hispanic

Analog television

- 3 WCIA, CBS
- 7 W07DD, Three Angels Network
- 12 WILL-TV, PBS
- 15 WICD "NewsChannel 15", ABC
- 17 WAND, NBC
- 23 WBUI, The CW
- 27 WCCU "Fox 55/27"
- 34 W33AY, Trinity Broadcast Network
- 44 WBXC-CA, MTV 2
- 49 WCIX "My WCFN TV", My Network TV
- 51 WEIU, PBS

Digital television (DTV)

- 9 WILL-DT, PBS
- 18 WAND-DT, NBC
- 22 WBUI-DT, WB
- 26 WCCU-DT, Fox
- 41 WICD-DT, ABC
- 48 WCIA-DT, CBS
- 50 WEIU-DT, PBS

Print

- The News-Gazette, daily local newspaper
- Daily Illini
- Buzz Weekly
- The Public I independent media newspaper

== Transportation ==
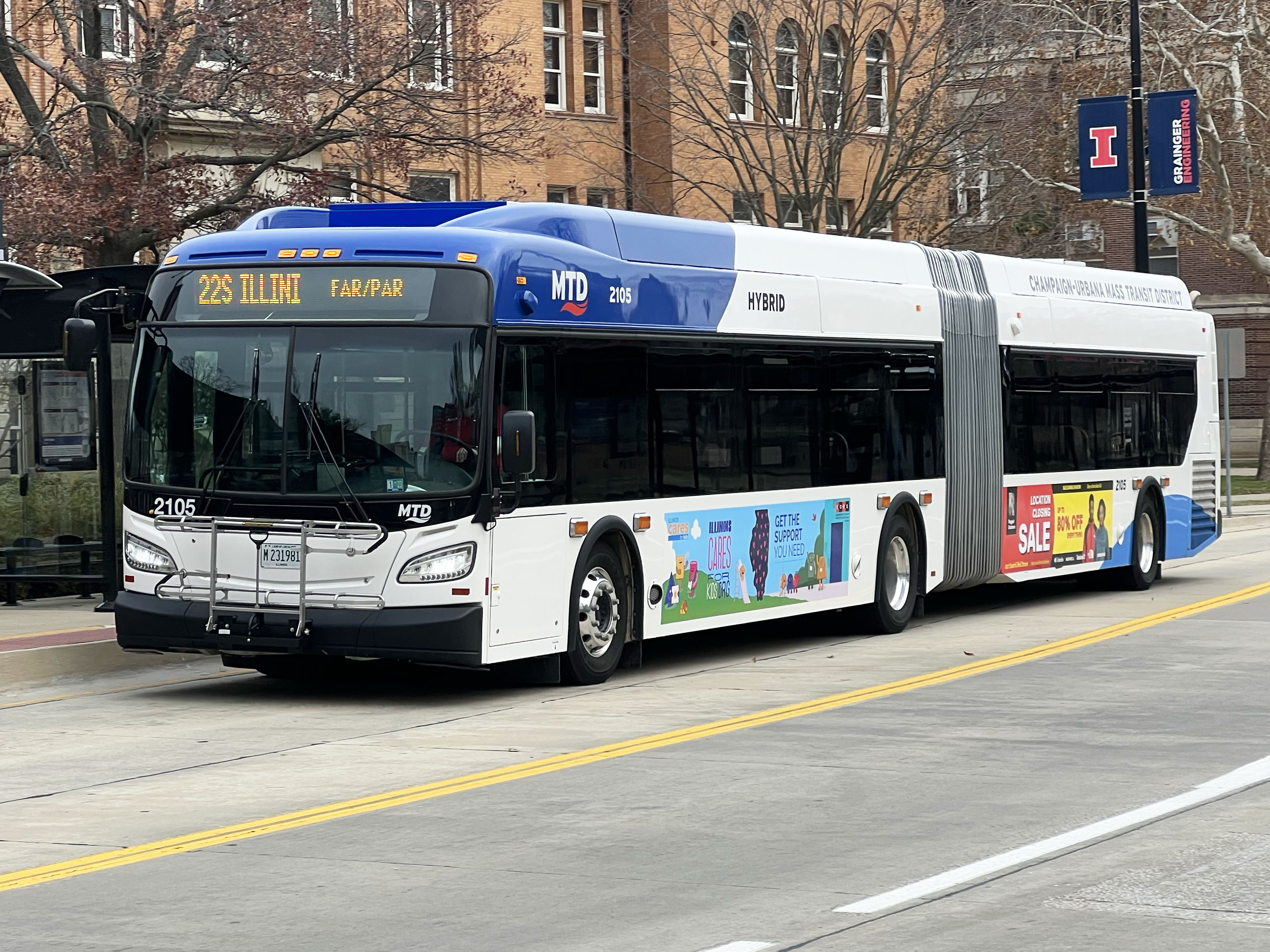
A Champaign–Urbana Mass Transit District bus

Downtown Urbana is located southwest of the intersection of its two busiest streets: U.S. 150 (University Avenue) and U.S. 45 (Vine Street-Cunningham Avenue).

Most of Urbana lies south of I-74. There are three exits (from west to east): Lincoln (I-74 milepost 183), Cunningham (184) and University (185). The Lincoln exit is closest to the University of Illinois, while the Cunningham exit goes to downtown Urbana. The university exit goes to downtown Urbana as well as Illinois Route 130 to Philo.

Local bus service is primarily provided by the Champaign–Urbana Mass Transit District, although limited service is available from Champaign County Area Rural Transit System and Danville Mass Transit, operators that primarily serve Rantoul and Danville, respectively.

The Norfolk Southern operates an east to west line through Urbana. The NS line connects industries in eastern Urbana to the Norfolk Southern main line at Mansfield, Illinois, west of Champaign. The line now operated by Norfolk Southern is the former Peoria & Eastern Railway, later operated as part of the Big Four (Cleveland, Cincinnati, Chicago and St. Louis Railway), New York Central, Penn Central, and Conrail systems, being sold by Conrail to Norfolk Southern in 1996. Construction of the line was begun by the Danville, Urbana, Bloomington and Pekin Railroad. This short-lived entity became part of the Indianapolis, Bloomington and Western Railway before the railroad was completed. A branch line of the Norfolk and Western Railway (formerly the Wabash Railroad) used to connect Urbana with the main line from Danville to Decatur at Sidney, Illinois, but this was first rerouted and later closed in the early 1990s.

University of Illinois Willard Airport serves the city.

== In popular culture ==
In the 1968 film 2001: A Space Odyssey, Urbana was named as the location where the HAL 9000 computer of the ill-fated Discovery Mission to Jupiter was programmed. The 1959 comedy Some Like It Hot also mentions Urbana. Near the beginning of this film, Jack Lemmon's character, an unemployed bass player, complains to Tony Curtis's character, a saxophone player, that they have agreed to go all the way to Urbana for a one-night stand to play at the University of Illinois. Instead, the two musicians elected to join a women's band in Florida. Urbana provides the setting for Bert I. Gordon's 1957 science-fiction film, Beginning of the End. Parodied on the television program, Mystery Science Theater 3000, this movie features the unintentional creation of dangerous, giant grasshoppers as a result of agricultural research gone awry.

University of Illinois Urbana-Champaign English professor and National Book Award-winner Richard Powers set his novel Galatea 2.2 at the multidisciplinary Beckman Institute for Advanced Science and Technology. Spanish writer Javier Cercas uses Urbana as the geographical background for two of his novels, La velocidad de la luz (2005) and El inquilino (1989).

The "American Football House", which is famously pictured on emo band American Football's albums, is located at 704 West High Street.

== Sister cities ==
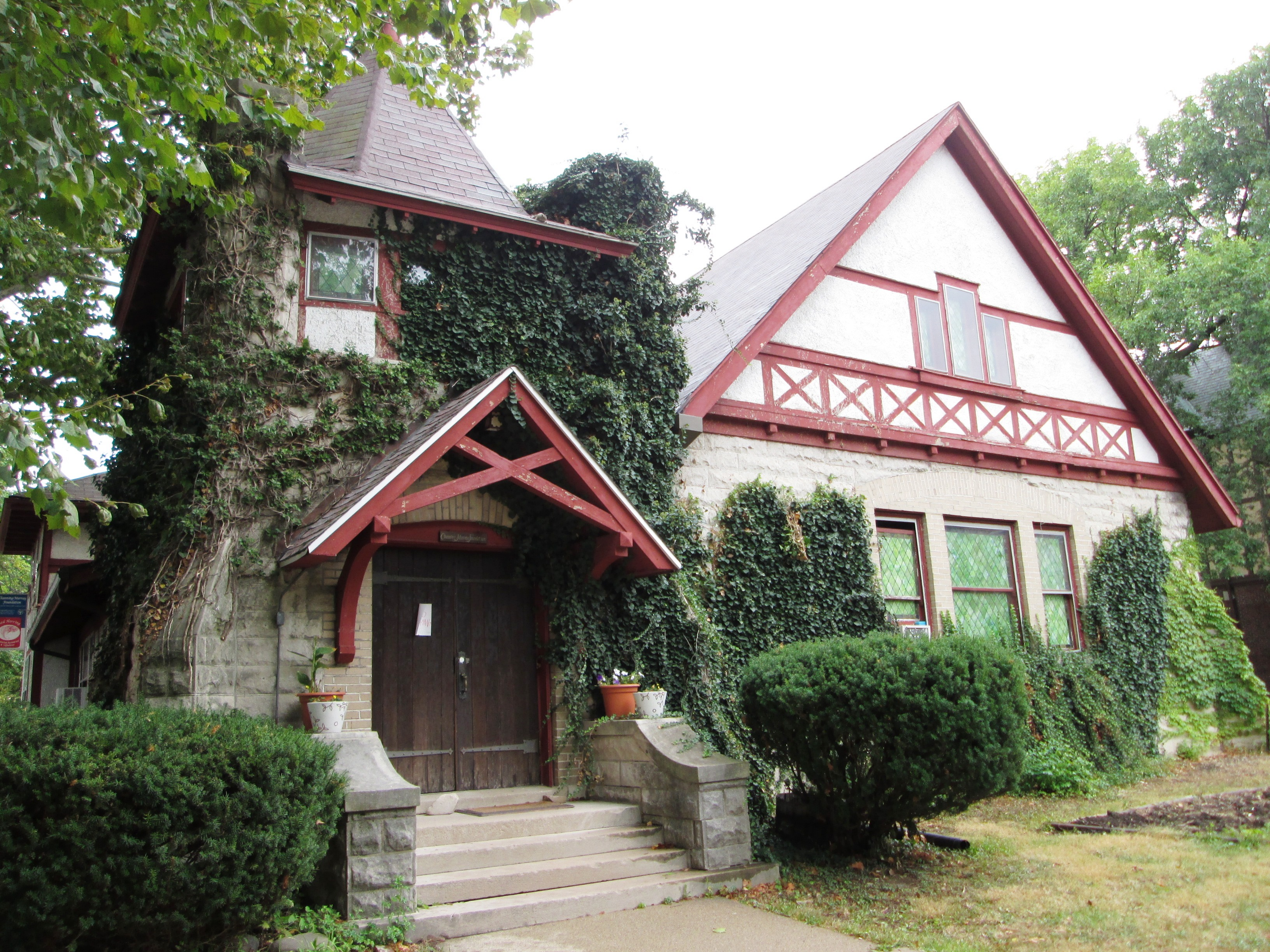
The Channing-Murray Foundation is housed in the former Unitarian Church of Urbana on the University of Illinois campus

Urbana is twinned with three sister cities:

- Zomba, Malawi
- Haizhu, Guangzhou, China
- Thionville, France

The city of Urbana has been awarded a major grant from Sister Cities International to undertake a trilateral pilot project involving Urbana, Zomba, Malawi, and the Haizhu District, China. The one-year Sino-African Initiative grant is for up to $100,000 and will involve a collaborative effort to improve the municipal waste disposal system in Zomba, a city of 88,000 in southeast Africa. Urbana has had a Sister City relationship with Zomba since 2008, another relationship with Haizhu District, Guangzhou City, China since 2012, and added a third sister city charter with Thionville, France, in 2014. Urbana is one of only three cities in the United States to be awarded a Sino-African grant. The others are Denver and an Asheville/Raleigh, N.C., joint team application.
