= WDNL =

Coordinates: 40°08′58″N 87°37′35″W

- Danville, Illinois; United States
- Broadcast area: East-Central Illinois; West-Central Indiana
- Frequency: 102.1 MHz
- Branding: D102

Programming
- Format: Hot AC

Ownership
- Owner: Champaign Multimedia Group; (Champaign Multimedia Group, LLC)
- Sister stations: WDAN, WRHK

History
- First air date: May 1967
- Call sign meaning: DaNviLle

Technical information
- Licensing authority: FCC
- Facility ID: 48332
- Class: B
- ERP: 50,000 watts
- HAAT: 112 meters (367 ft)

Links
- Public license information: Public file; LMS
- Webcast: Listen Live
- Website: WDNL Online

WDNL (102.1 FM, "D102") is a radio station broadcasting a Hot AC format. Licensed to Danville, Illinois, the station serves East-Central Illinois and West-Central Indiana, and is owned by Neuhoff Corp., through licensee Neuhoff Media Danville, LLC.

On February 1, 2024, Neuhoff Media sold radio stations in Danville and Decatur IL to Champaign Multimedia Group for $2 million and has since closed in May 2024.

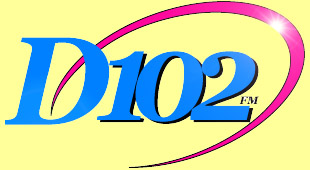
Previous logo

== History ==
- 1938 WDAN is signed on-air by Northwestern Publishing Company and broadcast from the Hotel Wolford in downtown Danville.
  - Dick Van Dyke, actor, began his career at WDAN in the mid 1940s after attending Danville High School.
  - Northwestern Publishing Company was owned by Gannett Company, which not only owned WDAN, but the Commercial-News Newspaper in Danville, and several other media properties including The Democrat and Chronicle and WHEC in Rochester, The Ithaca Journal in Ithaca, The Hartford Times and WTHT Hartford, The Elmira Gazette and WENY Elmira.
- 1953 WDAN-TV would sign-on, owned by Northwest Publishing Company to serve the nearby Champaign-Urbana television market. In 1960, WDAN-TV would be sold to Plains Broadcasting which would later become WICD-TV.
- 1967 WDAN-FM would sign on from its studios at 1500 Washington Street in Danville.
- 1971 WDAN-AM/FM was purchased by First Danville Radio owned by Max Shafer, Bill Shop, and John Eckert.
- 1977 First Danville Radio was purchased by Sangamon Broadcasting of Springfield.
- 1986 Sangamon Broadcasting tried to sell WDAN and WDNL to Indiana Broadcaster David Kiester for $1.5 Million, but the purchase never closed.
- 1987 WDAN and WDNL was sold by Sangamon Broadcasting to Majac Inc. owned by Marc and Jack Steenbarger of Canton Ohio for $1.2 Million. Majac would expand into the Flint Michigan market purchasing WWCK A/F in 1989.
- 1989 Majac Inc. sells WDAN and WDNL to Geoffrey Neuhoff of Neuhoff Communications for $2.35 Million. The stations join Neuhoff's other radio stations in Springfield, WCVS-AM and WFMB-FM.
- 1996 Neuhoff Communications would purchase what would become sister station WRHK for $500,000 from Rollings Communications of Danville.
- 2024 Longtime owner Neuhoff Communications sells WDAN, WDNL and WRHK to Champaign Multimedia for $2 Million, which is owned and operated by Community Media Group. The stations join Champaign-Urbana based WDWS-AM, WDWS-FM, WHMS, WKIO and The News-Gazette.
