= WKIO =

WKIO may refer to:

- WKIO (FM), a radio station (105.5 FM) licensed to Monticello, Illinois, United States
- WDWS-FM, a radio station (107.9 FM) licensed to Arcola, Illinois, which used the call sign WKIO from 2013 until 2024
- WREE, a radio station (92.5 FM) licensed to Urbana, Illinois, which used the call sign WKIO from 1978 until 2005
