= WJEK =

- Rantoul, Illinois; United States
- Broadcast area: Champaign-Urbana
- Frequency: 95.3 MHz
- Branding: Christian FM 95.3

Programming
- Format: Christian adult contemporary

Ownership
- Owner: SJ Broadcasting LLC
- Sister stations: WGKC; WQQB; WSJK

History
- First air date: March 15, 1972
- Former call signs: WRTL-FM (1972–1984); WRBZ-FM (1984–1988); WZNF (1988–2000); WBNB (2000–2002); WEVX (2002–2006); WMYE (2006–2007); WLFH (2007–2010)

Technical information
- Licensing authority: FCC
- Facility ID: 57466
- Class: A
- ERP: 1,900 watts
- HAAT: 126 meters (413 ft)
- Transmitter coordinates: 40°13′5.1″N 88°6′55.1″W

Links
- Public license information: Public file; LMS
- Webcast: Listen live
- Website: www.christian953.com

WJEK (95.3 FM) is a commercial radio station broadcasting a Christian adult contemporary radio format, known as "Christian FM 95.3". Licensed to Rantoul, Illinois, United States, the station serves the Champaign-Urbana metropolitan area. The station is owned by SJ Broadcasting, LLC.

== History ==
The station signed on March 15, 1972, as WRTL-FM, the FM sister station of (but separately programmed from) WRTL (1460 AM); it received its first license on December 7. WRTL-FM was originally owned by Bob Brown and Dick Williams. Its musical format was easy listening. John Truscelli was eventually the morning drive personality, Mark Williams the morning news personality. Other on-air personalities were Bob Boice, Kevin Scott, Ann Bailey, Dan Jones. WRTL-FM was sold in the early 1980s; on November 21, 1984, the station changed its call sign to WRBZ-FM.

The call sign was changed to WZNF on July 1, 1988. WZNF was a rock/classic rock station owned by Rollings Communications. At its height in the early 1990s, WZNF's signal was simulcast into three additional markets: WWDZ (94.9 FM) in Danville; WZZP (95.1 FM) in Kankakee; and WZNX (107.9 FM) in Charleston-Mattoon. During this time, it employed the moniker "Z95" and then later "The Fox".

The station's call sign changed to WBNB on January 3, 2000; to WEVX on March 1, 2002, to WEVX; to WMYE on September 18, 2006; and to WLFH on September 14, 2007. The WLFH callsign was previously used by an AM station in Little Falls, New York (currently WIXT). As WLFH, 95.3 was "95.3 The Wolf".

On May 21, 2010, it was announced that RadioStar, Inc. was in the process of selling WLFH to SJ Broadcasting LLC. SJ Broadcasting is operated by Steve "Stevie Jay" Khachaturian (formerly of WDWS) and Clint Atkins (until Atkins' death in March 2011). On November 8, 2010, WLFH changed its call sign to WJEK. On November 29, 2010, WJEK changed its format to talk, branded as "Connect FM". WSJK (93.5 FM) and WJEK broadcast a variety of programs, with owner Stevie Jay providing his show weekday mornings. Both stations offered Wall Street Journal This Morning, Fox News Radio, as well as ESPN Radio on nights and weekends. Connect FM became the new Champaign home of the St. Louis Cardinals in 2011, replacing WDWS after almost 70 years. Before the switch, 93.5 was known as "93.5 The Beat".

In April 2012, WSJK/WJEK cancelled its late-morning and midday talk programs and replaced them with ESPN Radio programs. In September 2012, Connect FM was officially rebranded as "93.5/95.3 ESPN". Although the stations now had a sports radio format, two non-sports programs—Wall Street Journal This Morning and the Stevie Jay Show—were retained.

The afternoon-drive sports show, the Tay and J Show, focused heavily on the Illinois Fighting Illini and was co-hosted by former WAND sportscaster Lon Tay and former News-Gazette and DeKalb Daily Chronicle reporter Jeremy Werner, who also writes for Rivals.com.

On February 18, 2013, WJEK split from its simulcast with WSJK and changed its format to adult contemporary, branded as "Sunny 95.3". On November 1, 2016, WJEK changed its format to contemporary Christian, branded as "Christian FM 95.3".
