= WXTT =

WXTT could refer to:

- WYXY 99.1 Savoy, Illinois, which formerly had the callsign WXTT and was known as "eXtra 99.1"
- W221CK 92.1 Champaign, Illinois, which took over the programming from 99.1 as "eXtra 92.1"
