= WLFH =

WLFH may refer to:

- WLFH (FM), a radio station (88.9 FM) licensed to serve Claxton, Georgia, United States
- WIXT (AM), a radio station (1230 AM) licensed to Little Falls, New York, United States, which held the call sign WLFH from 1952 to 2005
- WJEK, a radio station (95.3 FM) licensed to Rantoul, Illinois, United States, which held the call sign WLFH from 2007 to 2010
