= Mix 94.5 (disambiguation) =

Mix 94.5 may refer to one of the following radio stations:

== Australia ==
- 6MIX in Perth

== United States ==
- KZMJ 94.5 FM "K-Soul" in Dallas, Texas
- WLRW in Champaign, Illinois
