= Loren Tate =

American sports writer

- Born: November 3, 1931 (age 94)
- Education: University of Illinois
- Occupation: Football/Basketball sports journalist
- Years active: 1966-present
- Employer(s): Champaign News-Gazette; WDWS
- Spouse(s): Ilene Gadbury Tate Gasser; Lex Tate
- Children: 4 (3 through Gasser, 1 through Tate)

Loren Burton Tate is a sports journalist covering the Illinois Fighting Illini. He began working for the News-Gazette in 1966 and retired from most writing in 2017, but continues to write a Sunday column and participate in a radio show. Tate was inducted into the Illinois Basketball Coaches Hall of Fame in 1974 and later inducted into the U.S. Basketball Writers Association Hall of Fame in 2021.

== Works ==
- A Century of Orange and Blue - with Jared Gelfond (Sports Pub. L.L.C., 2004)
- Tatelines (The News-Gazette, 2008)
