= WDZ =

- Decatur, Illinois; United States
- Broadcast area: Macon County, Illinois
- Frequency: 1050 kHz
- Branding: Fox Sports 1050 AM Decatur

Programming
- Format: Sports
- Affiliations: Fox Sports Radio; Chicago Cubs Radio Network; Chicago Bears Radio Network; Millikin Big Blue football

Ownership
- Owner: Champaign Multimedia Group; (Champaign Multimedia Group, LLC)
- Sister stations: WDZQ; WKIO; WSOY; WSOY-FM

History
- First air date: March 17, 1921 (as 9JR in Tuscola, Illinois); April 5, 1922 (as WDZ)
- Call sign meaning: none (randomly assigned)

Technical information
- Licensing authority: FCC
- Facility ID: 53348
- Class: B
- Power: 1,000 watts day; 250 watts night
- Transmitter coordinates: 39°48′54.1″N 89°0′8.3″W

Links
- Public license information: Public file; LMS
- Webcast: Listen live
- Website: nowdecatur.com/fox-sports-1050-am-home/

WDZ (1050 AM) is a commercial radio station, licensed to Decatur, Illinois. It broadcasts a sports radio format and calls itself "Fox Sports 1050". It is owned by the Champaign Multimedia Group, which also owns four other local radio stations, WDZQ, WKIO, WSOY and WSOY-FM. Studios and offices are located on North Water Street. It is one of the oldest radio stations in Illinois, and one of the few that still carry a three-letter call sign along with WGN and WLS in Chicago.

WDZ operates on 1050 kHz, a clear channel frequency reserved for Mexico. By day, WDZ is powered at 1,000 watts non-directional. It must reduce power to 250 watts at night so it does not interfere with other stations on the frequency. WDZ is diplexed (i.e., shares the vertical radiator) with WSOY. The transmitter site is on St. Louis Bridge Road at Wesley Road in Decatur.

== Programming ==
WDZ is a network affiliate of Fox Sports Radio. It also airs Chicago Cubs baseball and Chicago Bears football, as well as local high school football games and Millikin Big Blue football.

== History ==
=== 9JR ===
Although WDZ was first licensed as a broadcasting station in early 1922, this was actually a relicensing and continuation of operations begun under an amateur station license, 9JR, issued to James L. Bush a year earlier. Some WDZ publicity calls itself the oldest radio station in Illinois, starting as an experimental agricultural station in 1917 (although WBBM in Chicago traces its history to 1911). However evidence is lacking for a pre-1921 establishment date. Clyde E. Wiley later claimed that, assuming a 1921 start, WDZ was "the second broadcasting station in the country, (some say third, but what difference does it make now?)".

James Bush was a commodity broker who operated the James Bush Grain Company in Tuscola, Illinois. At the start of the 1920s the company received price quotations by private telegraph wire from the Chicago Board of Trade. Clyde E. Wiley was hired as a telegraph operator to receive the reports, which were then individually telephoned to various local grain elevators that might be interested in selling their holding. Wiley also had extensive experience as a radio operator, and was aware of recent advances in vacuum-tube radio technology that made audio transmissions practical. He proposed that the company establish a station to simultaneously distribute grain price information to all interested parties, and thus avoid the complexity and cost of individual telephone calls. Bush agreed with this idea, and a new organization, The Tuscola Radio Supply Station, was formed to conduct the broadcasts as well as sell and install radio receivers. The first transmitter, installed by Wiley, had a power rating of 10 watts.

The new service debuted on March 17, 1921, and it is thought that this was the first radio station to provide this kind of service. Initially there were only two customers: elevators at Dorans, near Mattoon, and on the Illinois Central Railroad branch line in Decatur. Curtis Marsh, then a 14-year-old office boy, later reported that he was drafted to make the announcements. The first organized programming consisted of five- to ten-minute blocks every half-hour, each consisting of a phonograph record that was played to aid tuning the receivers, followed by a gong sounded as an alert signal, then the market reports. After this the station remained silent until the start of the next report.

A review by Clyde E. Wiley in The Grain Dealers Journal that appeared at the end of 1921 explained the new service as: "Mr. Bush, in furnishing the conditions to us, has in mind only the reduction of telephone tolls, labor and so forth. He has no means of knowing when a person receives the market through us and gives his grain business to another firm. Our service is like newspaper service in that respect. Naturally, however, he expects that most of the people receiving markets through us will at least give him the benefit of some of their trade, and regards the system as an up-to-date advertising feature. The Tuscola Radio Supply Station will be glad at any time to take up the matter of installing similar systems at other points."

In late 1921 there were an estimated six county elevators and banks that had installed radios to receive the quote broadcasts. One participant calculated that there was a one-time cost of approximately $258 to install a high quality receiver, which then could pick up the half-hourly reports at no additional cost. This compared favorably to the $18 per month that Western Union charged for its more limited telegraphed grain and live-stock report services. In addition, the radio broadcasts were used by the Bush company to confirm executed sales for its clients, using a code number to insure confidentiality. After the service gained popularity, Western Union and Postal Telegraph tried to have James Bush expelled from the Chicago Board of Trade, on the grounds that he was infringing on what they claimed were their exclusive rights to distribute prices. But, after a review, the Board sided with Bush.

The station soon added some general entertainment programming. A September 10, 1921 letter from Clyde E. Wiley to an electrical supplier reported that "Twice each week we broadcast phonograph music, and in each case the big unit is run for one hour without stop." In November, the station's market report schedule was reported to start at 9:30 a.m., running subsequent half hours after that until the final report at 1:00 p.m.

=== WDZ ===
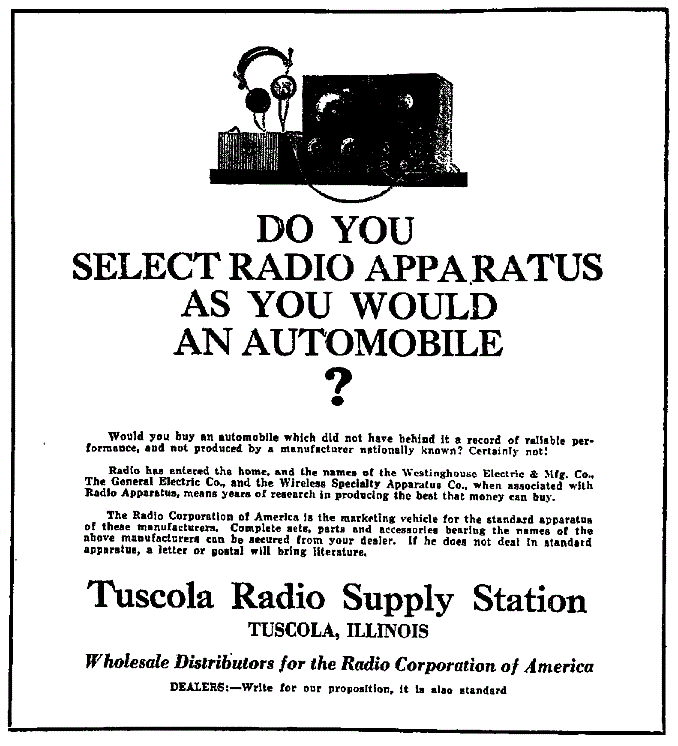
Tuscola Radio Supply Station advertisement (1922)

Beginning in late 1912, radio communication in the United States was regulated by the Department of Commerce. Initially there were no formal standards for which stations could make broadcasts intended for the general public. After World War One stations under a variety of license classes, most commonly Amateur and Experimental, began making regularly scheduled programs on a limited basis. In order to provide common standards for the service, the Commerce Department issued a regulation effective December 1, 1921 that stated that broadcasting stations would now have to hold a Limited Commercial license that authorized operation on two designated broadcasting wavelengths: 360 meters (833 kHz) for "entertainment", and 485 meters (619 kHz) for "market and weather reports". On April 5, 1922 a broadcasting station license with the randomly assigned call letters WDZ was issued to James L. Bush, for operation on 360 meters. In 1923 the number of available operating frequencies was greatly expanded, and WDZ was reassigned to broadcast on 1080 kHz, although its power initially remained at 10 watts.

Following the establishment of the Federal Radio Commission (FRC), stations were initially issued a series of temporary authorizations starting on May 3, 1927. In addition, they were informed that if they wanted to continue operating, they needed to file a formal license application by January 15, 1928, as the first step in determining whether they met the new "public interest, convenience, or necessity" standard. On May 25, 1928, the FRC issued General Order 32, which notified 164 stations, including WDZ, that "From an examination of your application for future license it does not find that public interest, convenience, or necessity would be served by granting it." However, the station successfully convinced the commission that it should remain licensed.

On November 11, 1928, the FRC made a major reallocation of transmitting frequencies under the provisions of its General Order 40, and WDZ was shifted to 1070 kHz, sharing this assignment with WCAZ in Carthage, Illinois. Moreover, this was a "clear channel" frequency, and WDZ and WCAZ were limited to daytime-only operation in order to eliminate any potential interference to the nighttime signal of the frequency's primary occupant, WTAM in Cleveland, Ohio. In 1936 WDZ moved to 1020 kHz and raised its power from 100 to 250 watts. It no longer had to share transmitting hours with WCAZ, but was still restricted to daylight hours, in order to protect the frequency's "clear channel" station, KYW in Philadelphia. WDZ's power was increased to 1,000 watts in 1939 with a new 252-foot (77 m) tower.

During this time, WDZ aired remote broadcasts that were unique for a rural station. The station started the use of remote broadcasting equipment which included a truck called the "WDZ White Relay Truck", equipped with a 100-watt transmitter to relay broadcasts from area locations, and some two-watt, battery operated transmitters that could be worn on the backs of assistants when a program originated from remote sites.

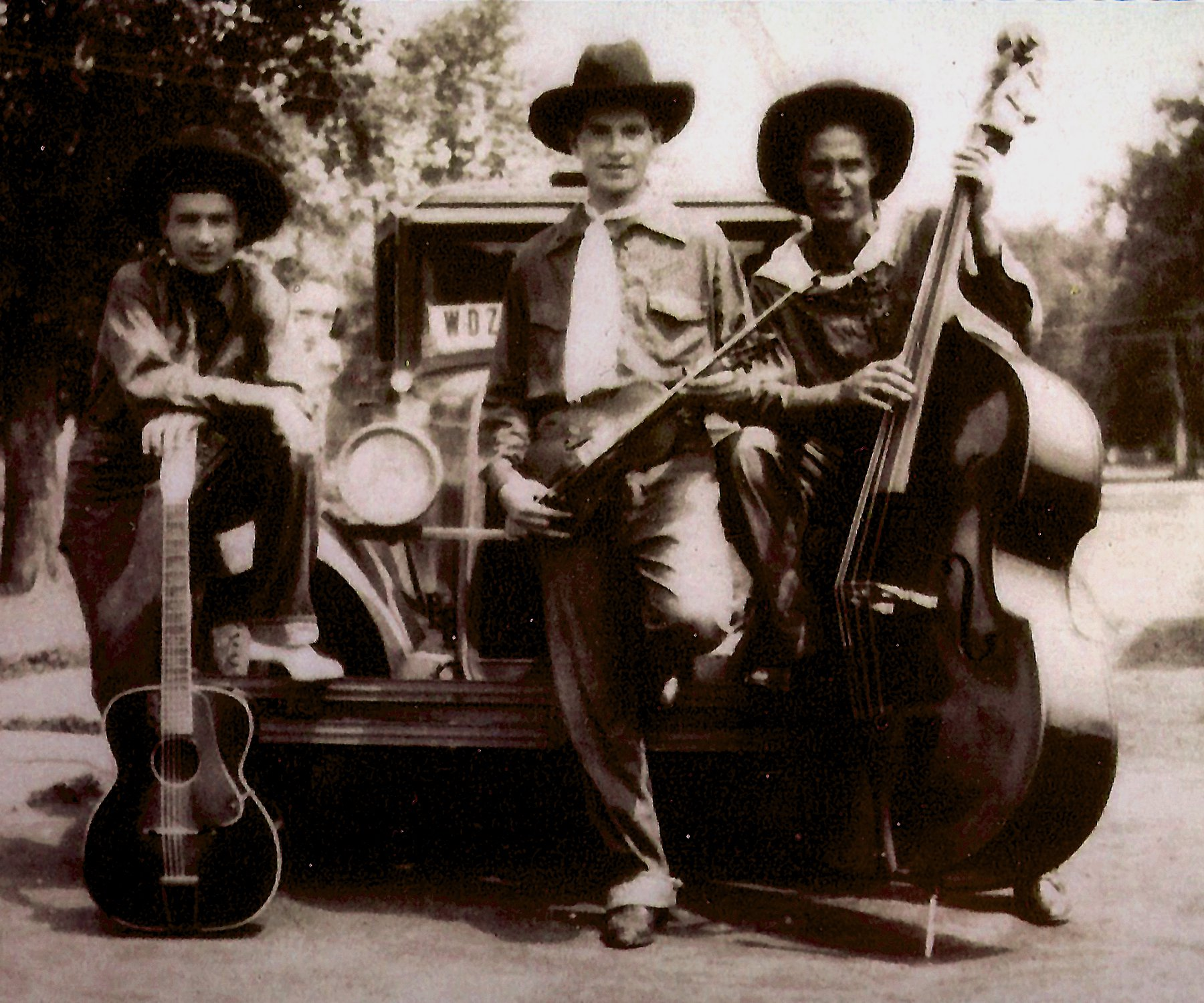
Rhythm Riders: L to R 'skinny' Masseneli, John Samuel Cox, Cecil Wright, posing with WDZ truck, circa 1939.

The Federal Communications Commission took over regulation of U.S. radio stations in 1934. In 1941 the North American Regional Broadcasting Agreement (NARBA) resulted in another major reallocation of transmitting frequencies, and WDZ was moved to 1050 kHz, where it has remained ever since. In 1949, WDZ moved from Tuscola to Decatur, although a remote studio was maintained in Tuscola until 1958. This relocation allowed for the eventual allocation of a station on 1080 kHz, WNWI in Oak Lawn, Illinois, a suburb of Chicago.

Under the 1941 NARBA agreement, 1050 kHz was designated a Mexican clear channel frequency, assigned to XEG in Monterrey. American stations operating on Mexican clear channel frequencies were restricted to 1,000 watts, daytime-only, until the "Rio" treaty took effect in the late 1980s. Afterward, it was a simple matter for WDZ to add night operations with the maximum power permitted, 250 watts. Anything more than 1,000 watts days and 250 watts nights very likely would require installation of an expensive directional antenna system.

Logo under previous ESPN Radio affiliation

On March 31, 2008, the station switched from an urban adult contemporary music format branded as "Magic 1050" to an all-sports format as part of the Fox Sports Radio network. Within a year the station switched programming from Fox to ESPN Radio.

WDZ and its sister stations WCZQ in Monticello and WDZQ, WSOY, and WSOY-FM in Decatur, were sold to Neuhoff Media in February 2009.

On January 4, 2021, WDZ changed affiliations back to Fox Sports Radio as Fox Sports 1050 AM Decatur.

On February 1, 2024, Neuhoff Media sold its radio stations in Danville and Decatur to Champaign Multimedia Group for $2 million; the sale closed in May 2024.

=== Smiley Burnette ===
Smiley Burnette started his entertainment career on WDZ in 1929. He was hired after he came to the station to do an advertising spot for the furniture store where he worked. Burnette ran all aspects of the radio station from being the disc jockey and music director to doing janitorial work. He was known to read the comics from the day's newspaper using different voices and sound effects, as much of his audience were children.

Smiley (real name Lester) got his nickname from a character in Mark Twain's "The Celebrated Jumping Frog of Calaveras County", which he was reading on the air. He initially used "Smiley" as a name for a character in a new children's program he was creating for the station but it later became his nickname, as did the name "Frog". He then left WDZ to work with Gene Autry on Chicago's WLS in December 1933. Two decades later Smiley's wife, Dallas wrote: "Smiley's first employers were Mr. and Mrs. James L. Bush, owners of a grain office in Tuscola and then owners of WDZ, third oldest radio station in the country. Mommie and Uncle Jim, as Smiley and I call them, are like a second set of parents to us and we visit them whenever possible in Tuscola or in Florida in the winter or Wisconsin in the summer."

== See also ==
- List of initial AM-band station grants in the United States
- List of three-letter broadcast call signs in the United States
