= WDAN =

- Danville, Illinois; United States
- Frequency: 1490 kHz
- Branding: 1490 AM

Programming
- Format: News/Talk
- Affiliations: Fox News Radio; Danville Dans; Indianapolis Colts Radio Network; St. Louis Cardinals Radio Network

Ownership
- Owner: Champaign Multimedia Group; (Champaign Multimedia Group, LLC)
- Sister stations: WDNL; WRHK

History
- First air date: 1938
- Call sign meaning: "Danville"

Technical information
- Licensing authority: FCC
- Facility ID: 48330
- Class: C
- Power: 1,000 watts unlimited
- Transmitter coordinates: 40°8′58.13161″N 87°37′35.07390″W

Links
- Public license information: Public file; LMS
- Website: vermilioncountyfirst.com/wdan-danvilles-talk-station/

WDAN (1490 AM) is a radio station broadcasting a news/talk format. Licensed to Danville, Illinois, the station is owned by Neuhoff Corp. through licensee Neuhoff Media Danville, LLC.

On February 1, 2024, Neuhoff Media sold radio stations in Danville and Decatur, Illinois to Champaign Multimedia Group for $2 million and has since closed in May 2024.
