= WSJK =

Radio station in Tuscola–Champaign, Illinois

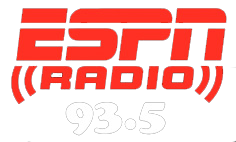
- Tuscola, Illinois; United States
- Broadcast area: Champaign-Urbana
- Frequency: 93.5 MHz
- Branding: ESPN Radio 93.5

Programming
- Format: Sports
- Affiliations: ESPN Radio

Ownership
- Owner: S.J. Broadcasting, LLC
- Sister stations: WGKC; WJEK; WQQB

History
- First air date: 1970 (as WIIT)
- Former call signs: WIIT (1968–1993); WUBB (1993–1994); WKTW (1994–1995); WEBX (1995–2010)

Technical information
- Licensing authority: FCC
- Facility ID: 57471
- Class: A
- ERP: 5,000 watts
- HAAT: 109.8 meters (360 ft)
- Transmitter coordinates: 39°58′25.1″N 88°14′18.2″W

Links
- Public license information: Public file; LMS
- Webcast: Listen live
- Website: www.espncu.com

WSJK (93.5 MHz) is a commercial FM radio station in Tuscola, Illinois that serves the Champaign-Urbana metropolitan area. It is owned by S.J. Broadcasting, and airs a sports radio format as an affiliate of ESPN Radio. Some hours on weekday mornings are devoted to local talk programming. WSJK is part of the St. Louis Cardinals Radio Network.

WSJK has an effective radiated power (ERP) of 5,000 watts. The transmitter is on County Road 1200 East in Tolono, Illinois. The station first signed on in 1994.

== Programming ==
ESPN Radio 93.5 airs 19 hours of nationally syndicated ESPN Radio shows, including Keyshawn, JWill and Max, Mike Greenberg (Greeny) and Canty and Golic Jr.. The Stevie Jay morning show airs locally from 7-9 a.m. and focuses on politics, sports and other current event topics. Football Hall of Famer Mike Ditka joins the show 7:30 a.m. every Monday and Friday, along with host Stevie Jay Khachaturian's brother, Jonny.

The "Tay and J Show" is the afternoon drive time sports show, hosted by former WAND sportscaster Lon Tay and former The News-Gazette and Daily Chronicle reporter Jeremy Werner, with a focus on the Illinois Fighting Illini, as well as the St. Louis Cardinals and Chicago's professional teams. Frequent guests on the Tay and J Show include: former Illini basketball players Stephen Bardo and Sean Harrington, former Illini quarterback Nathan Scheelhaase, former NFL player Fred Wakefield and Cardinals broadcaster Mike Claiborne, as well as reporters who cover the Illini, Big Ten, recruiting, MLB, NFL and NBA. Popular segments on the show include "Who Ya Got?", "Know Your Enemy", and the "Friday 5 at 5 Showdown".
