= WREE =

Radio station in Urbana, Illinois

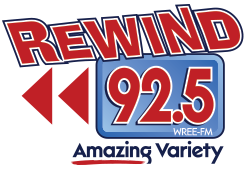
- Urbana, Illinois; United States
- Broadcast area: Champaign–Urbana
- Frequency: 92.5 MHz
- Branding: Rewind 92.5

Programming
- Format: Classic hits

Ownership
- Owner: Saga Communications; (Saga Communications of Illinois, LLC)
- Sister stations: WIXY; WLRW; WYXY

History
- First air date: December 4, 1967 (as 103.9 WTWC)
- Former call signs: WTWC (1967–1978); WKIO (1978–2005); WCFF (2005–2015)
- Call sign meaning: "Rewind"

Technical information
- Licensing authority: FCC
- Facility ID: 41592
- Class: B1
- ERP: 16,000 watts
- HAAT: 125 meters (410 ft)
- Transmitter coordinates: 40°0′45.00″N 88°8′29.00″W

Links
- Public license information: Public file; LMS
- Webcast: Listen live
- Website: rewind925.com

WREE (92.5 MHz) is a commercial FM radio station broadcasting a classic hits format. Licensed to Urbana, Illinois, United States, the station serves the Champaign–Urbana area. The station is owned by Saga Communications under licensee Saga Communications of Illinois, LLC, and operates as part of its Illini Radio Group. The station calls itself "Rewind 92.5." The playlist ranges from hits of the 1960s to the 1990s, switching to Christmas music for part of November and December.

WREE has an effective radiated power (ERP) of 16,000 watts. The transmitter is on 1700 East Road at 900 North Road in Philo.

== History ==
The station signed on the air on December 4, 1967. Its call sign was WTWC and it originally broadcast on 103.9 MHz. It had an easy listening format, including songs from the adult contemporary and country music charts as well as soft instrumentals. In the 1980s, the station broadcast oldies during the day and album rock music at night. The slogan was Oldies by Day, Rock by Night.

The station changed formats in May 2005. The switch left Champaign without an oldies station until March 2013, when WUIL flipped from active rock to oldies-based classic hits and brought back the callsign WKIO. For a time, WCFF broadcast Chicago Bears football games.

On January 25, 2015, WCFF changed its callsign to WREE in advance of a format change.

On February 23, 2015, WREE began stunting and then launched a 1980s-centric classic hits format branded as "Rewind 92.5".
