= WSOY (AM) =

Coordinates: 39°48′54.1″N 89°0′8.3″W

- Decatur, Illinois; United States
- Broadcast area: Macon County, Illinois
- Frequency: 1340 kHz
- Branding: News/Talk 1340 WSOY

Programming
- Format: Talk radio
- Affiliations: Premiere Networks; Westwood One; Salem Radio Network; Fox News Radio

Ownership
- Owner: Champaign Multimedia Group; (Champaign Multimedia Group, LLC)
- Sister stations: WDZ; WDZQ; WKIO; WSOY-FM

History
- First air date: 1925
- Former call signs: WJBL (1925–1939)
- Former frequencies: 1110 kHz (1925–1927); 1410 kHz (1927–1928); 1200 kHz (1928–1939); 1310 kHz (1939–1941)
- Call sign meaning: References Decatur's "The Soy City" nickname.

Technical information
- Licensing authority: FCC
- Facility ID: 36945
- Class: C
- Power: 1,000 watts
- Translator: 103.3 W277DB (Decatur)

Links
- Public license information: Public file; LMS
- Website: www.nowdecatur.com

WSOY (1340 kHz) is a commercial AM radio station broadcasting a Talk radio format. Licensed to Decatur, Illinois, the station is owned by Champaign Multimedia Group, LLC. The company owns four other local radio stations: WDZ, WDZQ, WKIO and WSOY-FM. Studios and offices are located on North Water Street and the transmitter site is near St. Louis Bridge Road, sharing the same tower as WDZ.

WSOY operates at 1,000 watts, day and night, using a non-directional antenna. Programming is also carried by a 250 watt FM translator, W277DB at 103.3 MHz.

== Programming ==
WSOY airs local and nationally syndicated programming. Weekdays begin with America in The Morning followed by an agricultural show, R.F.D. Illinois, and the long-running wake-up show Byers & Company with host Brian Byers. Other syndicated programming includes Brian Kilmeade, Markley, Van Camp and Robbins from WMBD in Peoria, Sean Hannity, Mike Gallagher, and Coast to Coast AM with George Noory. Most hours begin with an update from Fox News Radio.

== History ==
WSOY is one of the oldest radio stations in Central Illinois. Both Federal Communications Commission (FCC) records, and station tradition, trace its history to 1925, as WJBL. However, in 1928 WJBL was consolidated with another station, WBAO, which dated to 1922.

=== WBAO ===
On April 25, 1922, a license was issued to James Millikin University for a new broadcasting station operating on a wavelength of 360 meters (833 kHz). This station was randomly assigned the call letters WBAO, which came from a sequential roster of available call signs. In 1924 WBAO was reassigned to 1090 kHz, moved the next year to 1110 kHz, and was reassigned on June 15, 1927 to 1120 kHz. The station maintained a limited schedule of university broadcasts.

On May 25, 1928, the recently formed Federal Radio Commission (FRC) issued General Order 32, which notified 164 stations, including WBAO, that "From an examination of your application for future license it does not find that public interest, convenience, or necessity would be served by granting it." On September 1, 1928, the FRC listed "Stations WJBL and WBAO" as one of the "consolidations which have been approved by the commission, or imposed on the stations by the commission". WBAO was formally deleted on October 1, 1928, and it was announced that programs previously broadcast by that station would now be heard over WJBL.

=== WJBL / WSOY ===
On September 23, 1925, a license was issued to the William Gushard Dry Goods Company for a new broadcasting station, with studios and transmitter at the Gushard Building at 301 North Water Street, operating on 1110 kHz. The station's call letters, WJBL, were also randomly assigned from the sequential roster of available call signs. During this era dry goods and variety stores commonly sold radio receivers, and sometimes operated radio stations in order to give buyers something to listen to. WJBL moved to 1410 kHz in mid-1927.

As was the case with WBAO, WJBL was included on the May 25, 1928 list of stations in General Order 32, that were required to justify their continued existence. These stations were given the opportunity to appeal this finding in hearings held on July 9. On August 23, 1928, the FRC released four rulings, including that it had decided to renew WJBL's license. This was followed by the announcement of WJBL's consolidation with WBAO, with the FRC noting that "In this case WJBL has been reduced from its present assignment of 250 to 100 watts during the hours of 6 o'clock p.m. to 6 o'clock a.m., in order to eliminate interference by that station in regions beyond the service area which it is reasonably entitled to serve." On November 11, 1928, as part of a major reallocation due to the implementation of the FRC's General Order 40, WSOY moved to a "local" frequency of 1200 kHz, on a timesharing basis with WJBC in LaSalle.

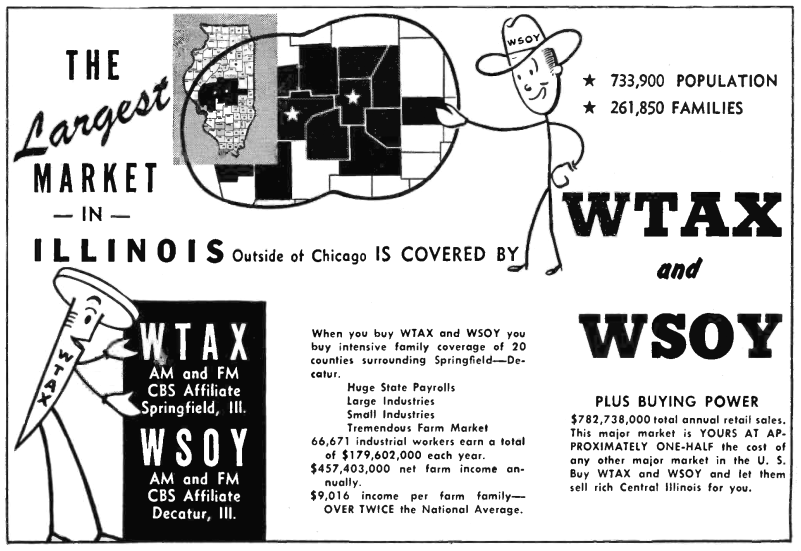
1951 advertisement for WSOY and WTAX in Springfield.

In 1929, Commodore Broadcasting was formed and took ownership of WJBL, and the station's studios were moved to the Hotel Orlando, although in 1934 they returned to the Gushard Building. In 1937, the Decatur Herald & Review purchased a minority stake in the station, followed by the newspaper purchasing controlling interest on July 27, 1939. On November 12, 1939, the call sign was changed to WSOY, a reference to soybeans, which are a major agricultural crop in the region. Around the same time its frequency was changed to 1310 kHz, and its power increased from 100 watts to 250 watts. The move to the new frequency allowed WSOY to expand its hours of operation to 24 hours a day, because it no longer was limited by having a timeshare partner. On March 29, 1941, as part of the implementation of the North American Regional Broadcasting Agreement, WSOY, along with most of the other stations on 1310 kHz, was moved to 1340 kHz.

In 1962, WSOY's daytime power was increased to 1,000 watts, and in 1985 the nighttime power was also increased to 1,000 watts. In 1986, the station was sold to Trumper Communications, and in 1988 Pinnacle Broadcasting purchased WSOY and WSOY-FM for $8,435,000. For many years, the station aired an MOR format, with farm and news programming as well. In 1992, the station adopted a news talk format. The station was purchased by NextMedia Group in 2000, by Archway Broadcasting in 2006, by Tom Joyner in 2007, and by Neuhoff Communications in 2008.

In 2017, WSOY's programming began to be rebroadcast on an FM translator at 103.3 MHz.

On February 1, 2024, Neuhoff Media sold its radio stations in Danville and Decatur to Champaign Multimedia Group for $2 million; the sale closed in May 2024.

== See also ==
- List of initial AM-band station grants in the United States
