= WSOY-FM =

- Decatur, Illinois; United States
- Broadcast area: Central Illinois
- Frequency: 102.9 MHz
- Branding: Y103

Programming
- Format: Top 40 (CHR)
- Affiliations: Compass Media Networks; Premiere Networks

Ownership
- Owner: Champaign Multimedia Group; (Champaign Multimedia Group, LLC)
- Sister stations: WDZ; WDZQ; WKIO (FM); WSOY

History
- First air date: November 1946
- Former frequencies: 98.7 MHz (1946–1948); 102.1 MHz (1948–1960)
- Call sign meaning: Refers to soybeans, commonly grown in the area

Technical information
- Licensing authority: FCC
- Facility ID: 36951
- Class: B
- ERP: 54,000 watts
- HAAT: 135 meters (443 ft)
- Transmitter coordinates: 39°52′41.1″N 88°56′32.3″W

Links
- Public license information: Public file; LMS
- Webcast: Listen live
- Website: www.nowdecatur.com/y103/

WSOY-FM (102.9 MHz) is a Top 40 (CHR) radio station licensed to Decatur, Illinois, and serves Central Illinois. The station is owned by the Neuhoff Corporation and calls itself "Y103". The call sign is shared with sister station WSOY (1340 AM), a reference to Decatur's role in soybean farming. On weekdays, Y103 carries two nationally syndicated shows during drive time: Brooke & Jeffrey from KQMV in Seattle in mornings and On Air with Ryan Seacrest from KIIS-FM in Los Angeles in afternoons.

WSOY-FM's radio studios and offices are on South Water Street in Decatur. The transmitter is on East Pershing Road at Vicki Drive. WSOY-FM has an effective radiated power (ERP) of 54,000 watts, which is slightly higher than the current maximum of 50,000 watts for Central Illinois.

== History ==
WSOY first received a construction permit for a new FM station on October 7, 1946. The original frequency was 98.7 MHz; under special temporary authority, WSOY-FM went on the air in November 1946. In 1948, the station moved to 102.1 MHz. WSOY-FM received its full license on February 2, 1949, powered at 31,200 watts on 102.1 MHz. The switch to 102.9 MHz received a construction permit in August 1959 and license on May 31, 1960. The increase to the current 54,000 watts received its construction permit in May 1961 and license on September 7, 1961.

At first, WSOY-FM largely simulcast the programming of WSOY (1340 AM). By the late 1960s, it tried an automated country music format, separate from the AM station. It later switched to beautiful music, playing quarter hour sweeps of mostly soft instrumental cover versions of popular songs.

In the early 1980s, WSOY-FM adopted a Top 40 format and the name "Y-103" to distinguish itself from its AM partner, though it remained mostly on automation until 2000. At that point, disc jockeys were hired.

On February 1, 2024, Neuhoff Media sold radio stations in Danville and Decatur IL to Champaign Multimedia Group for $2 million and has since closed in May 2024.
