= WQQB =

Coordinates: 40.224°N 88.299°W

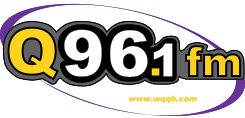
- Rantoul, Illinois; United States
- Broadcast area: Champaign-Urbana, Illinois
- Frequency: 96.1 MHz
- Branding: Q96.1fm

Programming
- Format: Top 40/CHR

Ownership
- Owner: SJ Broadcasting LLC

History
- First air date: February 9, 1993

Technical information
- Licensing authority: FCC
- Facility ID: 73229
- Class: A
- ERP: 3,800 watts
- HAAT: 123 meters (404 ft)

Links
- Public license information: Public file; LMS
- Webcast: Listen Live
- Website: www.wqqb.com

WQQB (96.1 MHz) is a Top 40/CHR FM radio station licensed to Rantoul, Illinois and serving the Champaign/Urbana radio market. It is owned by SJ Broadcasting LLC, headed by Stevie Jay Khachaturian, with radio studios and offices on Boulder Drive in Urbana. WQQB calls itself "Q96.1 - All The Hits!" It airs two nationally syndicated shows on weekdays, "The Kidd Kraddick Morning Show" from KHKS Dallas and "Zach Sang and the Gang" on weekday evenings.

WQQB is a Class A station with an effective radiated power (ERP) of 3,800 watts. The transmitter is on County Road 2400 North at 900 East in Mahomet, Illinois.

== History ==
WQQB was formerly WLTM (70s Hits - The Eagle) when it originated in 1993. The original owner was Rollings Communications. It was a predominantly automated radio station with a live morning show. In 1994, in order to target an untapped part of the market, the station switched to Urban Contemporary with the moniker Power 96. It kicked off on a Friday night with an entire weekend of looping the song "I Got The Power" by Snap, before going live on Monday morning.

In 1996, the station switched again to a regular CHR format when it was purchased by Liberty Radio II, Inc. The station (and its sister stations WGKC, WJEK, and WEBX) were sold to AAA Entertainment in 2000. The stations were subsequently purchased by one of the principals of Liberty Radio II, Jim Glassman, under his new company (RadioStar, Inc.) in 2006.

On May 21, 2010, it was announced that RadioStar, Inc. was in the process of selling WQQB to SJ Broadcasting LLC.
