= WDZQ =

Radio station in Decatur, Illinois

- Decatur, Illinois; United States
- Broadcast area: Central Illinois
- Frequency: 95.1 MHz
- Branding: 95Q

Programming
- Format: Country

Ownership
- Owner: Champaign Multimedia Group; (Champaign Multimedia Group, LLC)
- Sister stations: WDZ; WKIO; WSOY; WSOY-FM

History
- First air date: November 1, 1976

Technical information
- Licensing authority: FCC
- Facility ID: 47004
- Class: B
- ERP: 50,000 watts
- HAAT: 150 meters (490 ft)
- Transmitter coordinates: 39°37′40.1″N 89°4′51.3″W

Links
- Public license information: Public file; LMS
- Webcast: Listen live
- Website: www.nowdecatur.com/95q

WDZQ (95.1 FM 95Q) is a commercial radio station in Decatur, Illinois, serving Central Illinois. The station broadcasts a country radio format and is owned by Champaign Multimedia Group, LLC. Current weekday programming includes the Q Country Mornings with Kevin Lambert, Middays with Scott Chapman, The Afternoon Drive with Trish and the Night Shift with Rachel D.

WDZQ has an effective radiated power (ERP) of 50,000 watts, the maximum for Illinois FM stations. The transmitter is on North 2400 East Road at East 1900 North Road in Moweaqua.

== History ==
On November 1, 1976, the station first signed on the air. It was owned by the Mumbles Corporation. Then, as now, WDZQ had a country music format, although originally it was largely automated.

WDZQ began streaming its broadcasts over the internet via its website www.95q.com in February 2008.

The station was awarded Medium Market Station of the Year by the Illinois Broadcasters Association in 2015 and 2016.

On February 1, 2024, Neuhoff Media sold its radio stations in Danville and Decatur to Champaign Multimedia Group for $2 million; the sale closed in May 2024.
