= WRHK =

Coordinates: 40°10′40.1″N 87°28′55.1″W

- Danville, Illinois; United States
- Broadcast area: Attica, Indiana; Hoopeston, Illinois
- Frequency: 94.9 MHz
- Branding: 94.9 K-Rock

Programming
- Format: Classic rock

Ownership
- Owner: Champaign Multimedia Group; (Champaign Multimedia Group, LLC)
- Sister stations: WDAN; WDNL

History
- First air date: November 1992 (as WZMF)
- Former call signs: WZMF (1990–1992); WWDZ (1992–1997)

Technical information
- Licensing authority: FCC
- Facility ID: 57465
- Class: A
- ERP: 6,000 watts
- HAAT: 100 meters (330 ft)

Links
- Public license information: Public file; LMS
- Webcast: Listen live
- Website: vermilioncountyfirst.com/k-rock/

WRHK 94.9 FM is a radio station broadcasting a classic rock format. Licensed to Danville, Illinois, the station is owned by Neuhoff Corp., through licensee Neuhoff Media Danville, LLC.

On February 1, 2024, Neuhoff Media sold radio stations in Danville and Decatur, Illinois, to Champaign Multimedia Group for $2 million; the deal closed in May 2024.
