= WGKC =

Coordinates: 40.224°N 88.299°W

- Mahomet, Illinois; United States
- Broadcast area: Champaign-Urbana, Illinois
- Frequency: 105.9 MHz
- Branding: US 105.9

Programming
- Format: Country

Ownership
- Owner: SJ Broadcasting LLC
- Sister stations: WSJK, WJEK, WQQB

History
- First air date: October 30, 1990 (as WHZT)
- Former call signs: WHZT (1990–1996)

Technical information
- Licensing authority: FCC
- Facility ID: 10112
- Class: A
- ERP: 2,500 watts
- HAAT: 156 meters (512 ft)

Links
- Public license information: Public file; LMS
- Webcast: Listen Live

WGKC (105.9 FM, "U.S. 105.9") is a country music radio station licensed to Mahomet, Illinois and broadcasting in the Champaign-Urbana, Illinois radio market. The station is owned by SJ Broadcasting, LLC.

== History ==
WGKC was originally WHZT and was started by Adlai Stevenson IV, grandson of former presidential candidate Adlai Stevenson II, in 1990. WHZT was later owned and operated by Odyssey Communications, Inc. Oddyssey ran the syndicated Z-Rock format. Z-Rock was known as the station in Champaign-Urbana with the hearse.

Odyssey Communications sold WHZT in 1996 to Liberty Radio II, Inc. The new owners dropped the Z-Rock format and the WHZT call letters. On November 15, 1996, WHZT became Classic Rock 105.9 WGKC. The station gained its name from WCKG in Chicago, which was a classic rock station at the time. The first song played on WGKC was "Start Me Up" by The Rolling Stones.

WGKC was mostly jockless minus a live and local morning show hosted by Dennis Miller (not the comedian). In 1999, Liberty Radio moved syndicated morning duo Bob and Tom from sister station, WZNF "Rock 95-3", to WGKC.

In March 2000 Liberty Radio II, Inc. sold WGKC along with sister stations WQQB, WZNF, and WEBX to AAA Entertainment, LLC. The stations were subsequently purchased by one of the principals of Liberty Radio II, Jim Glassman under his new company (RadioStar, Inc.) in 2006.

On May 21, 2010, it was announced that RadioStar, Inc. was in the process of selling WGKC to SJ Broadcasting LLC. SJ Broadcasting is operated by Steve "Stevie Jay" Khachaturian and Clint Atkins (before Atkins' death in March 2011).

In 2011, the station replaced Bob and Tom with ESPN's Mike and Mike in the Morning.

In 2012, WGKC became the Champaign affiliate of the Chicago Cubs, as they took over from WDWS, who had been broadcasting the Cubs for one year.

On January 14, 2013, WGKC changed their format to country, branded as "US 105.9".
