= WLRW =

Radio station in Champaign, Illinois

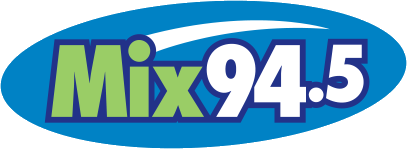
- Champaign, Illinois; United States
- Broadcast area: Champaign–Urbana
- Frequency: 94.5 MHz (HD Radio)
- Branding: Mix 94.5

Programming
- Format: Hot adult contemporary
- Subchannels: HD2: 97.9 The Vibe (Urban adult contemporary)

Ownership
- Owner: Saga Communications; (Saga Communications of Illinois, LLC)
- Sister stations: WIXY; WREE; WYXY

History
- First air date: January 1963; 63 years ago

Technical information
- Licensing authority: FCC
- Facility ID: 58542
- Class: B
- ERP: 50,000 watts
- HAAT: 138 meters (453 ft)
- Transmitter coordinates: 40°7′35.00″N 88°17′25.00″W
- Translator: HD2: 97.9 W250BL (Champaign)

Links
- Public license information: Public file; LMS
- Webcast: Listen live; Listen live (HD2)
- Website: www.mix945.com; HD2: 979thevibe.com%20979thevibe.com

WLRW (94.5 FM) is a radio station broadcasting a hot adult contemporary radio format. It is licensed to Champaign, Illinois, United States, and serves Central Illinois. The station is owned by Saga Communications, and operates as part of its Illini Radio Group.

WLRW broadcasts using HD radio technology. An urban adult contemporary format airs on its HD2 digital subchannel, which is repeated on FM translator W250BL at 97.9 FM in Champaign-Urbana.
