= WYXY =

Radio station in Savoy, Illinois

- Savoy, Illinois; United States
- Broadcast area: Champaign–Urbana
- Frequency: 99.1 MHz
- Branding: WYXY Classic 99.1

Programming
- Format: Classic country
- Affiliations: Compass Media Networks

Ownership
- Owner: Saga Communications; (Saga Communications of Illinois, Inc.)
- Sister stations: WIXY; WLRW; WREE

History
- First air date: 1970 (as WIAI)
- Former call signs: WIAI (1970–2003); WXLS (2003–2004); WXTT (2004–2010)
- Call sign meaning: from sister country station WIXY

Technical information
- Licensing authority: FCC
- Facility ID: 28195
- Class: B
- ERP: 50,000 watts
- HAAT: 152 meters (499 ft)
- Transmitter coordinates: 40°08′53.1″N 87°46′21.1″W (NAD83)
- Translators: 99.1 W256BN (November–December 2009); 97.9 W250AT (2004–2009)

Links
- Public license information: Public file; LMS
- Webcast: Listen live
- Website: www.wyxyclassic.com

WYXY (99.1 FM) is a radio station licensed for Savoy, Illinois, United States, and serving the Champaign–Urbana area. It is owned by Saga Communications, and operated as part of its Illini Radio Group.

WYXY formerly had the callsigns WIAI then WXLS. It was sold from IAI Broadcasting to Saga Communications in 2004 and changed its callsign to WXTT. During that time, the station was known on-air (popularly) as Extra 99.1. In early January 2010, the WXTT format was moved to 100.3 WIXY-HD2 and its analog translator 92.1 W221CK in Champaign and the "WIXY Classic" format that was being tested on those stations was moved to 99.1. On January 9, 2010, 99.1 changed its callsign to WYXY.

WYXY had an associated broadcast translator, 99.7 W259BG Champaign, Illinois, which was W256BN until December 9, 2009, and before that was W250AT since July 8, 2004.
