= WHMS-FM =

- Champaign, Illinois; United States
- Broadcast area: Champaign-Urbana
- Frequency: 97.5 MHz
- Branding: Lite Rock 97.5

Programming
- Format: Adult contemporary
- Affiliations: Premiere Networks; Fighting Illini Sports Network

Ownership
- Owner: Community Media Group, Inc.; (Champaign Multimedia Group, LLC)
- Sister stations: WDWS; WDWS-FM; WKIO

History
- First air date: 1949
- Former call signs: WDWS-FM (1949–1988)
- Call sign meaning: Helen M. Stevick, longtime publisher of The News-Gazette

Technical information
- Licensing authority: FCC
- Facility ID: 14962
- Class: B
- ERP: 50,000 watts
- HAAT: 109 meters (358 ft)
- Transmitter coordinates: 40°5′4.1″N 88°14′53.1″W

Links
- Public license information: Public file; LMS
- Webcast: Listen live
- Website: www.whms.com

WHMS-FM (97.5 FM) is a commercial radio station licensed to Champaign, Illinois, United States. It broadcasts an adult contemporary format as "Lite Rock 97.5" and is owned by The News-Gazette, the primary newspaper in the Champaign-Urbana Metropolitan Area.

WHMS-FM's transmitter is sited on South Nell Street (U.S. Route 45) at West Windsor Road in Champaign. Along with WDWS, WHMS-FM is the longtime broadcaster of the University of Illinois sports, simulcasting all Fighting Illini football and men's basketball games.

== History ==
In 1949, the station signed on as WDWS-FM, a sister station to WDWS (1400 AM). In its first decades, it mostly simulcast WDWS. In the late 1960s, it switched to a beautiful music format, playing quarter hour sweeps of mostly soft, instrumental cover versions of popular songs, as well as Broadway and Hollywood show tunes.

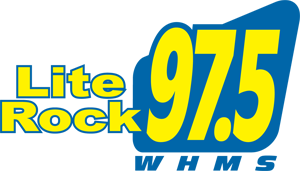
Previous logo

In the 1980s, as the easy listening audience was beginning to age, the station added more vocals to the playlist, eventually making the transition to soft adult contemporary music. It was renamed WHMS-FM in 1988 in honor of Helen M. Stevick, longtime publisher of the News-Gazette.
