= WIXY =

Radio station in Champaign, Illinois

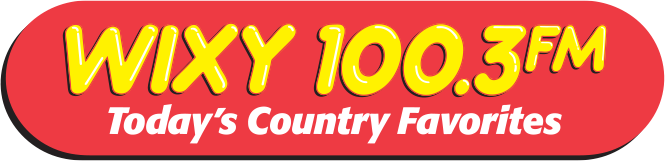
- Champaign, Illinois; United States
- Broadcast area: Champaign–Urbana
- Frequency: 100.3 MHz (HD Radio)
- Branding: WIXY 100.3 FM

Programming
- Format: Country
- Subchannels: HD2: Mainstream rock; HD3: Soft AC
- Affiliations: Motor Racing Network

Ownership
- Owner: Saga Communications; (Saga Communications of Illinois, LLC)
- Sister stations: WLRW; WREE; WYXY

History
- First air date: June 1, 1992

Technical information
- Licensing authority: FCC
- Facility ID: 58539
- Class: B1
- ERP: 13,000 watts
- HAAT: 138 meters (453 ft)
- Transmitter coordinates: 40°7′35.1″N 88°17′25.2″W
- Translators: HD2: 96.9 W245DP (Champaign); HD3: 99.7 W259BG (Champaign)

Links
- Public license information: Public file; LMS
- Webcast: Listen live; Listen live (HD2); Listen live (HD3)
- Website: wixy.com; extra969.com (HD2); myez997.com (HD3)

WIXY (100.3 FM) is a commercial radio station broadcasting a country music format. Licensed to Champaign, Illinois, United States, the station serves the Champaign–Urbana area. The station is owned by Saga Communications under licensee Saga Communications of Illinois, LLC, and operates as part of its Illini Radio Group. The studios are located on West Bradley Avenue in Champaign, and the transmitter is sited on County Road 1700 East at County Road 900 North in Philo, Illinois.

== History ==
The callsign WIXY has been used off and on in other U.S. cities, most notably in Cleveland, Ohio; that station later became WCCR. The current FM station was assigned the call sign WIXY by the FCC on December 13, 1991. WIXY began broadcasting on June 1, 1992.

== HD Radio ==
WIXY broadcasts using HD radio technology. It also had an FM translator, W221CK, on 92.1 MHz in Champaign. During late 2009, these ran a new "WIXY Classic" country format. In early January 2010, that format swapped with WXTT "eXtra 99.1" in Savoy; 99.1 changed its call sign to WYXY and picked up WIXY Classic, and the 92.1 WIXY-HD2 subcarrier and 92.1 translator changed branding to "WXTT eXtra 92.1" The translator for WXTT later switched to 96.9 W245DP. The active rock format is now known as "eXtra 96.9".

In May 2012, WIXY signed on an HD3 digital subchannel, and began airing a Top 40/CHR format branded as "Hits 99.7" (in reference to translator W259BG (99.7 FM), which dropped its simulcast of WIXY-HD2). On April 22, 2021, WIXY-HD3/W259BG changed to a soft adult contemporary format, branded as "EZ 99.7".

== See also ==
- WYXY — sister station 99.1 WIXY Classic
