= The News-Gazette (Champaign–Urbana) =

Newspaper published in Illinois, US

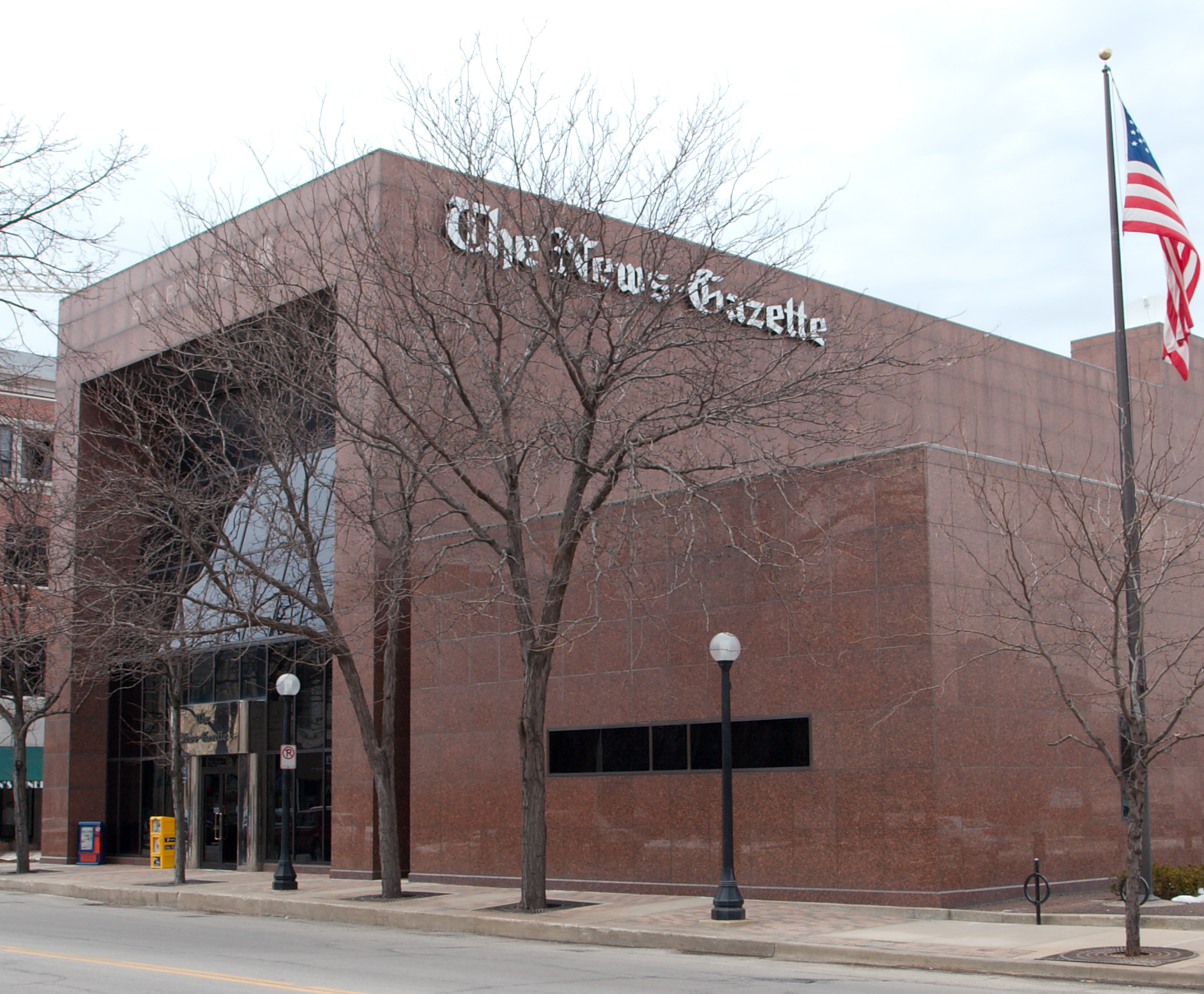
- The Stevick Building in downtown Champaign, Illinois, home of The News-Gazette from 1984 to 2020
- Type: Daily newspaper
- Format: Broadsheet
- Owner(s): Community Media Group, Inc. Champaign Multimedia Group, LLC
- Publisher: Paul Barrett
- Editor: Jim Rossow
- Founded: 1852 (as Urbana Union)
- Language: English
- Headquarters: 2101 Fox Drive Champaign, Illinois 61820
- Country: United States
- Circulation: 22,000–30,000
- ISSN: 1042-3354
- Website: news-gazette.com
- Free online archives: Illinois Digital Newspaper Collections: Champaign Daily News (1895–1919)

The News-Gazette is a daily newspaper serving eleven counties in the eastern portion of Central Illinois and specifically the Champaign–Urbana metropolitan area. Since November 2019 it is published daily Tuesday through Sunday. Based in Champaign, Illinois, the paper is owned, along with sister radio stations WDWS, WKIO and WHMS, by Community Media Group, Inc., which purchased it in November 2019 after the paper filed for bankruptcy. The News-Gazette has 23,000 subscribers and 50,000 daily readers as of 2025. The newspaper's website is the most viewed commercial website in East Central Illinois as of 2015. It is viewed by around 30,000–35,000 unique visitors a day, and receives 3.5 million page views per month.

== History ==
The paper traces its history to the Urbana Union, founded in 1852. By the turn of the century, it had moved to Champaign and become the Champaign Daily News. In 1919, David W. Stevick, owner and publisher of the Daily News, bought the Champaign Daily Gazette and merged them into the current paper. He died in 1935 and passed it to his widow, Helen M. Stevick, who died in 1967 and was succeeded by her daughter, Marajen Stevick Chinigo. She ran the paper until her death in 2002.

In 1979, the paper's longtime rival, the Champaign–Urbana Courier, ceased publication. This left Champaign with only one daily newspaper for the first time.

From its founding until June 2009, the News-Gazette published its main edition in the afternoon. The paper was well known in the area as being one of the few afternoon papers left. Beginning in the late 1990s, the paper printed an edition specifically geared towards Champaign and Urbana that was published in the morning. Due to the decreasing revenue from print advertising, the News-Gazette switched to morning publication only on June 1, 2009.

Since 1937, it has been co-owned with the area's oldest commercial radio station, WDWS. An FM sister was added in 1949; it is now WHMS. Another rock station, WUIL (now WKIO), was purchased in May 2010.

On April 11, 2017, the News-Gazette announced plans to phase out its local printing and packaging operations by mid-summer 2017. The Journal Star in Peoria, Illinois, would provide all printing and packaging services, and the move would eliminate approximately 35 full- and part-time positions.

News-Gazette Media filed for bankruptcy on August 30, 2019, and announced the purchase of the company's assets by Community Media Group, Inc., which owns several community newspapers throughout the country. The sale was finalized on November 10, 2019, at which point the News-Gazette ceased publishing its Monday print edition. The paper relocated to a smaller office building in Champaign in April 2020.

== Awards and recognition ==
The News-Gazette has consistently been an Illinois Press Association award-winning newspaper for editorial and advertising excellence. The newsroom has been honored with IPA's Mabel S. Shaw Memorial Trophy an unprecedented seven consecutive times under vice president of news Jim Rossow and editor Jeff D'Alessio. Additionally, The News-Gazette has been named one of Editor & Publisher's 10 Newspapers That Do It Right three times in that span in addition to three honorable mentions.

The News-Gazette has consistently ranked among the top sports sections among small markets in the country. Loren Tate, a Champaign sports writer and broadcaster, has been covering the Illinois Fighting Illini for the News-Gazette and WDWS since 1965.

Led by sports editor Matt Daniels, the News-Gazette's sports section in 2021 captured its first Triple Crown — top 10 in daily, Sunday and special sections — in the Associated Press Sports Editors' annual contest.
