= WKIO (FM) =

Coordinates: 40.048°N 88.574°W

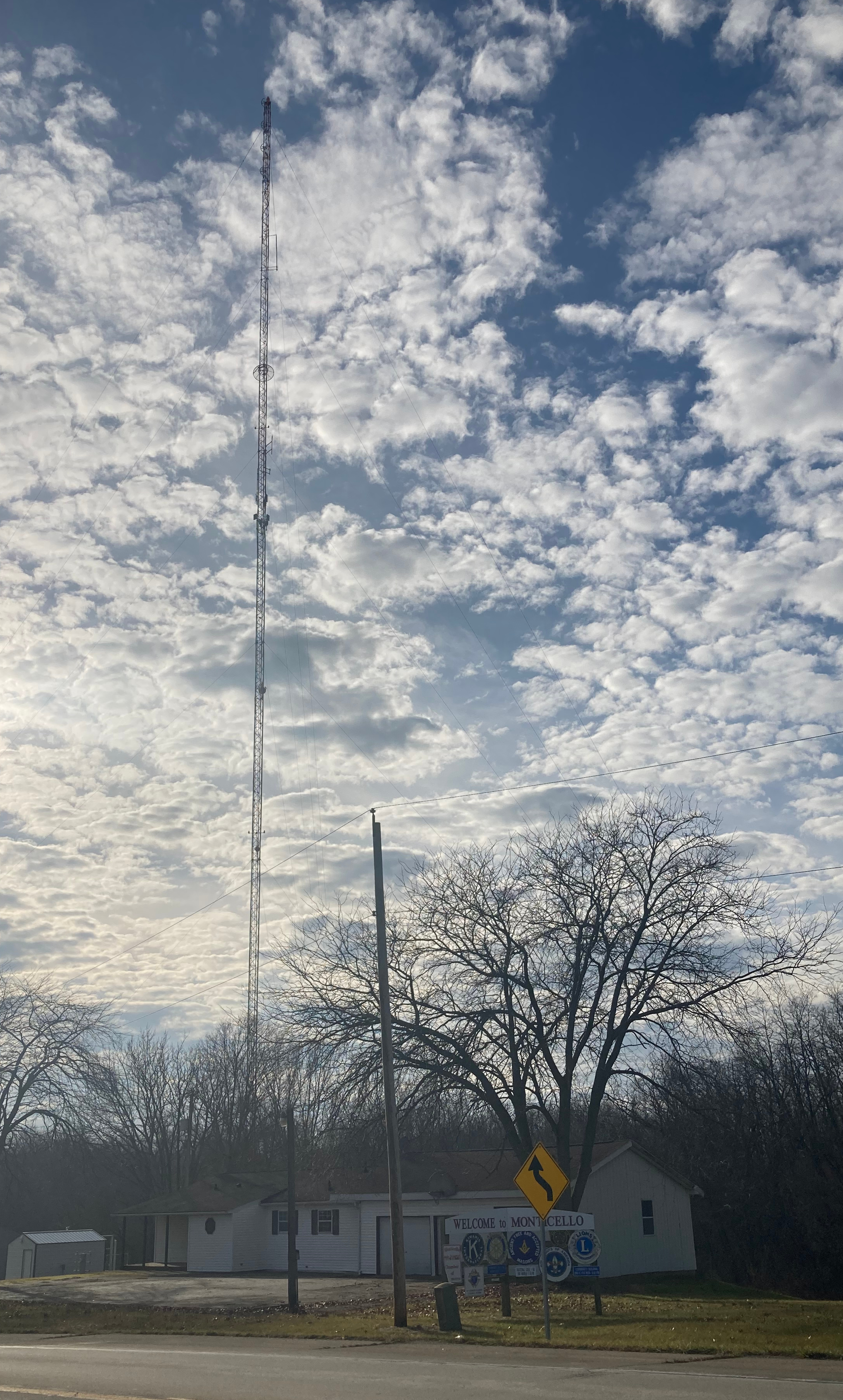
- Monticello, Illinois; United States
- Broadcast area: Decatur, Illinois; Champaign-Urbana
- Frequency: 105.5 MHz
- Branding: 105.5 WKIO

Programming
- Format: Classic rock
- Affiliations: Compass Media Networks; Premiere Networks

Ownership
- Owner: Champaign Multimedia Group; (Champaign Multimedia Group, LLC)
- Sister stations: WDWS; WDWS-FM; WDZ; WDZQ; WHMS-FM; WSOY; WSOY-FM

History
- First air date: 1991
- Former call signs: WCZQ (1991–2024)

Technical information
- Licensing authority: FCC
- Facility ID: 46942
- Class: A
- ERP: 6,000 watts
- HAAT: 100 meters (330 ft)

Links
- Public license information: Public file; LMS
- Webcast: Listen live
- Website: www.news-gazette.com/wkio/

WKIO (105.5 MHz) is a classic rock FM radio station serving Champaign, Illinois. WKIO broadcasts with an ERP of 6 kW and is licensed to Monticello, Illinois. It is owned by Champaign Multimedia Group.

== History ==
The station signed on in 1991 as WCZQ. It has been through multiple formats, including rhythmic and country.

On February 1, 2024, Neuhoff Media sold radio stations in Danville and Decatur to Champaign Multimedia Group for $2 million. The sale closed in May; on June 1, the station would assume new call sign WKIO, which moved from 107.9 FM, and on June 18, the station dropped the previous Neuhoff format, an urban contemporary format branded as "Hot 105.5", and assumed the branding and part of the format of 107.9 (shifting from the classic hits format it had on 107.9 to a classic rock format with the move to 105.5), with the stations simulcasting temporarily ahead of a move on the latter station. While Neuhoff ran WCZQ from Decatur, Champaign Multimedia Group operates WKIO alongside its existing properties in Champaign.
