= WDWS =

- Champaign, Illinois; United States
- Broadcast area: Champaign–Urbana
- Frequency: 1400 kHz
- Branding: News Talk 1400 & 93.9 DWS

Programming
- Format: News-talk
- Network: Fox News Radio
- Affiliations: Bloomberg Radio; CBS News Radio; Fox Sports Radio; NBC News Radio; Compass Media Networks; Premiere Networks; Westwood One; Chicago White Sox Radio Network; Illinois Fighting Illini Radio Network (flagship station)

Ownership
- Owner: Community Media Group, Inc.; (Champaign Multimedia Group, LLC)
- Sister stations: WDWS-FM; WHMS-FM; WKIO

History
- First air date: January 24, 1937
- Call sign meaning: David W. Stevick (publisher of News-Gazette)

Technical information
- Licensing authority: FCC
- Facility ID: 14961
- Class: C
- Power: 1,000 watts unlimited
- Transmitter coordinates: 40°5′4.1″N 88°14′53.2″W
- Translator: 93.9 W230CW (Champaign)

Links
- Public license information: Public file; LMS
- Webcast: Listen live
- Website: www.wdws.com

WDWS (1400 AM) is a commercial radio station in Champaign, Illinois, calling itself "Newstalk 1400 & 93.9FM DWS." It airs a news/talk radio format and is owned by The News-Gazette, the primary daily newspaper in the Champaign-Urbana Metropolitan Area. The radio studios and offices are at the newspaper's headquarters on Fox Drive in Champaign.

WDWS is powered at 1,000 watts around the clock using a non-directional antenna. The transmitter is on South Neil Street (U.S. Route 45) at West Windsor Road. WDWS provides at least secondary coverage to much of east-central Illinois, as far west as Decatur and Bloomington-Normal, due to the area's excellent ground conductivity. Programming is also heard on 250-watt FM translator W230CW at 93.9 MHz.

== Programming ==
WDWS airs a mix of local news, talk, agricultural reports and sports shows along with nationally syndicated programs. A local weekday drive time program, The DWS Morning Show, is hosted by Dave Gentry and C.W. Greer. In late mornings, Brian Barnhart hosts the long-running call-in show, Penny for Your Thoughts. In late afternoons, Scott Beatty hosts Sports Talk, with a focus on the Illinois Fighting Illini teams. Weekday syndicated programs include The Clay Travis and Buck Sexton Show; Markley, Van Camp and Robbins; CBS Eye on The World with John Batchelor; Red Eye Radio and America in the Morning.

On weekends, specialty shows are heard on health, money, gardening, home repair, technology and sports. Syndicated programs include The Kim Komando Show, The Money Pit Home Improvement Radio Show, The Ramsey Show with Dave Ramsey, Face The Nation, Meet The Press, the CBS News Weekend Roundup and Fox Sports Radio. Most hours begin with an update from CBS News Radio.

WDWS and sister station WHMS-FM are the flagship stations for Illinois Fighting Illini football and basketball. Chicago White Sox baseball games also air on WDWS. In addition, the station carries Fox Sports Radio programs on weekends.

== History ==
=== Early years ===
WDWS signed on the air on January 24, 1937. It was the area's first commercial radio station; WILL, the non-commercial radio station of the University of Illinois, dates its start to the 1920s.

David W. Stevick, publisher of The News-Gazette, had applied for a license in 1935, and his wife Helen and daughter Marajen continued the project. They named the station WDWS in his honor. In 1937, WDWS affiliated with the CBS Radio Network; it carried CBS's line up of dramas, comedies, news, sports, soap operas, game shows and big band broadcasts during the "Golden Age of Radio".

In 1949, WDWS added an FM station at 97.5 MHz. For most of its early years, WDWS-FM simulcast the programming of WDWS AM. In 1988 it switched its call sign to WHMS-FM to establish a separate identity.

=== Fighting Illini ===
WDWS and WHMS-FM are the flagship stations for Illinois Fighting Illini football and basketball games, a role that WDWS has held throughout its history. Longtime sports director Jim Turpin also doubled as the radio voice of the Illini from 1960 until 2002. WDWS also airs the Illini women's basketball, volleyball, and baseball games exclusively.

WDWS was the east central Illinois network affiliate for the St. Louis Cardinals baseball broadcasts from when it signed on until 2010. WDWS broadcast the Chicago Cubs in 2011, however Cubs games moved to WGKC in 2012. WDWS later became an affiliate of the Chicago White Sox Radio Network.

=== CBS Radio Network ===
WDWS has been a CBS Radio Network affiliate for its entire history, except for a period from 2001 to 2009 when it was affiliated with ABC News Radio. The station carried The Rush Limbaugh Show from 1997 until his death in 2021. Limbaugh's replacement, The Clay Travis and Buck Sexton Show is now heard in middays. The Sean Hannity Show was added in 2009.

WDWS's morning program is called "Penny for Your Thoughts." The show, formerly hosted by Jim Turpin, and later by Brian Barnhart, is known for its unique open-line call-in format.

Logo before translator sign on

In October 2021, WDWS began simulcasting on FM translator W230CW at 93.9 MHz and rebranded itself as "Newstalk 1400 & 93.9FM DWS."

== Notable staff ==
- Robert Goralski
- Larry Stewart
- Dave Gentry
- Loren Tate
- Brian Barnhart
- Dave Loane
- Steve Kelly
