= WDWS-FM =

- Arcola, Illinois; United States
- Broadcast area: Champaign-Urbana
- Frequency: 107.9 MHz
- Branding: 107.9 The Rooster

Programming
- Format: Country
- Affiliations: Westwood One

Ownership
- Owner: Community Media Group, Inc.; (Champaign Multimedia Group, LLC)
- Sister stations: WDWS; WHMS-FM; WKIO

History
- First air date: September 6, 1991 (as WZNX)
- Former call signs: WZNX (1991–1994); WKJR (1994–1997); WEXT (1997–2008); WUIL (2008–2013); WKIO (2013-2024)

Technical information
- Licensing authority: FCC
- Facility ID: 57469
- Class: A
- ERP: 3,600 watts
- HAAT: 130 meters (430 ft)
- Transmitter coordinates: 39°52′43.1″N 88°11′51.2″W

Links
- Public license information: Public file; LMS
- Webcast: Listen live
- Website: www.news-gazette.com/rooster/

WDWS-FM (107.9 FM, "107.9 The Rooster") is a commercial radio station broadcasting a country music format. Licensed to Arcola, Illinois, the station is owned by The News-Gazette, and serves the Champaign-Urbana metropolitan area.

== History ==
On September 6, 1991, the station signed on the air as WZNX. It changed its call sign to WKJR on November 1, 1994. On May 5, 1997, the station again changed its call sign to WXET before finally changing them to WUIL on May 7, 2008, upon its switch to a rhythmic contemporary format from hot adult contemporary.

Pendleton Broadcasting signed a LMA deal with owner Champaign Partners to operate Top 40/Rhythmic WUIL (107.9 JAMZ). The long-term deal started May 1, 2009, and carries an option to buy the station from Champaign Partners for $1.5 million.

In June 2010, WUIL was sold to The News-Gazette, which also owns WDWS and WHMS. The station relaunched as "U-Rock 107.9", playing various rock formats. The switch was made with station General Manager Mike Haile's introduction of "Ladies and Gentlemen...rock and roll." The station had a popular contest where it allowed listeners to submit and air their "Perfect Ten" rock songs. The station then played these selections on Thursdays.

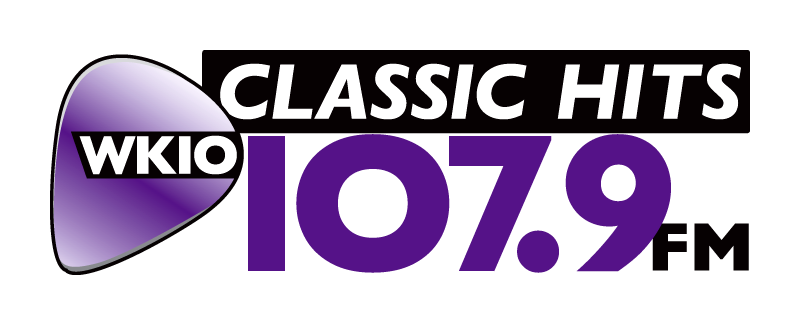
Previous logo

In March 2013, WUIL applied to change its call sign to WKIO, signaling a format change. On March 26, 2013, WUIL changed formats from rock to classic hits, branded as "Classic Hits 107.9" under the new WKIO call sign.

In early 2023, WKIO conducted a listener survey and added more recent music (Smashing Pumpkins, etc.) to its standard playlist and in response to "more music, less talk", replacing the popular The Bob and Tom Show with The Ashley and Brad Show in the daily morning slot.

On June 1, 2024, after Champaign Multimedia Group completed their acquisition of Neuhoff Media's Decatur stations, the WKIO callsign would move to the former WCZQ (105.5 FM), with 107.9 taking on new callsign WDWS-FM; on June 18, the branding and part of the format would make its official move to said frequency, shifting to a classic rock format with the move, with the two stations temporarily simulcasting as a means of transition. Upon the completion of the move the station was expected by several radio news outlets to flip to a simulcast of WDWS, a move seemingly confirmed by the WDWS-FM call sign. On July 5, 2024, WDWS-FM ended its simulcast with WKIO and instead launched a country music format, branded as "107.9 The Rooster".

== Former U-Rock air staff ==
- Orion Buckingham
- Dave Loane
- Brian Moline
- Mark Reynolds
- Lee Marcus
- Ethan VanDeveer
- Patti Good
