= WOUC =

WOUC may refer to:

- WOUC-FM, a radio station (89.1 FM) licensed to serve Cambridge, Ohio, United States
- WOUC-TV, a television station (channel 6, virtual 44) licensed to serve Cambridge, Ohio
