= WAIK =

- Galesburg, Illinois; United States
- Frequency: 1590 kHz
- Branding: Oldies 1590

Programming
- Format: Defunct

Ownership
- Owner: Wayne W. Whalen; (WPW Broadcasting)
- Sister stations: WMOI, WRAM

History
- First air date: 1957
- Last air date: January 14, 2019
- Former call signs: WQUB (1957–1959)

Technical information
- Facility ID: 49515
- Class: D
- Power: 5,000 watts day 55 watts night
- Transmitter coordinates: 40°57′43″N 90°18′30″W

WAIK (AM 1590) was a radio station licensed to Galesburg, Illinois, with studios in Monmouth, Illinois. It went silent in January 2019 and its license was cancelled in June 2019. At the time it closed, it was operating a full service format with oldies.

The station signed on the air as WQUB in 1957 as a sister station to WQUA in Moline. The WQUB construction permit was issued on April 3, 1957, and its first full license was granted on January 9, 1958. It was bought by Creative Broadcasting Ltd. in 1975 and had the call sign WAIK by 1979 with a middle of the road music format. WAIK broadcast Chicago White Sox Baseball, Chicago Bulls basketball, and featured programming from ABC Radio and Sporting News Radio.

In October 2018, owner WPW sold WAIK's sister stations, 1330 WRAM and 97.7 WMOI, both licensed for Monmouth, to Robbins-Treat Resources, but didn't include WAIK in the sale, instead taking WAIK off the air on January 14, 2019. The station's license was surrendered to the Federal Communications Commission on February 5, 2019, but it was not cancelled until June 19, 2019.
