= WOUB =

WOUB may refer to:

- WOUB (AM), a radio station (1340 AM) licensed to serve Athens, Ohio, United States
- WOUB-FM, a radio station (91.3 FM) licensed to serve Athens, Ohio
- WOUB-TV, a television station (channel 32, virtual 20) licensed to serve Athens, Ohio
