= Joe Tait =

American sports broadcaster (1937–2021)

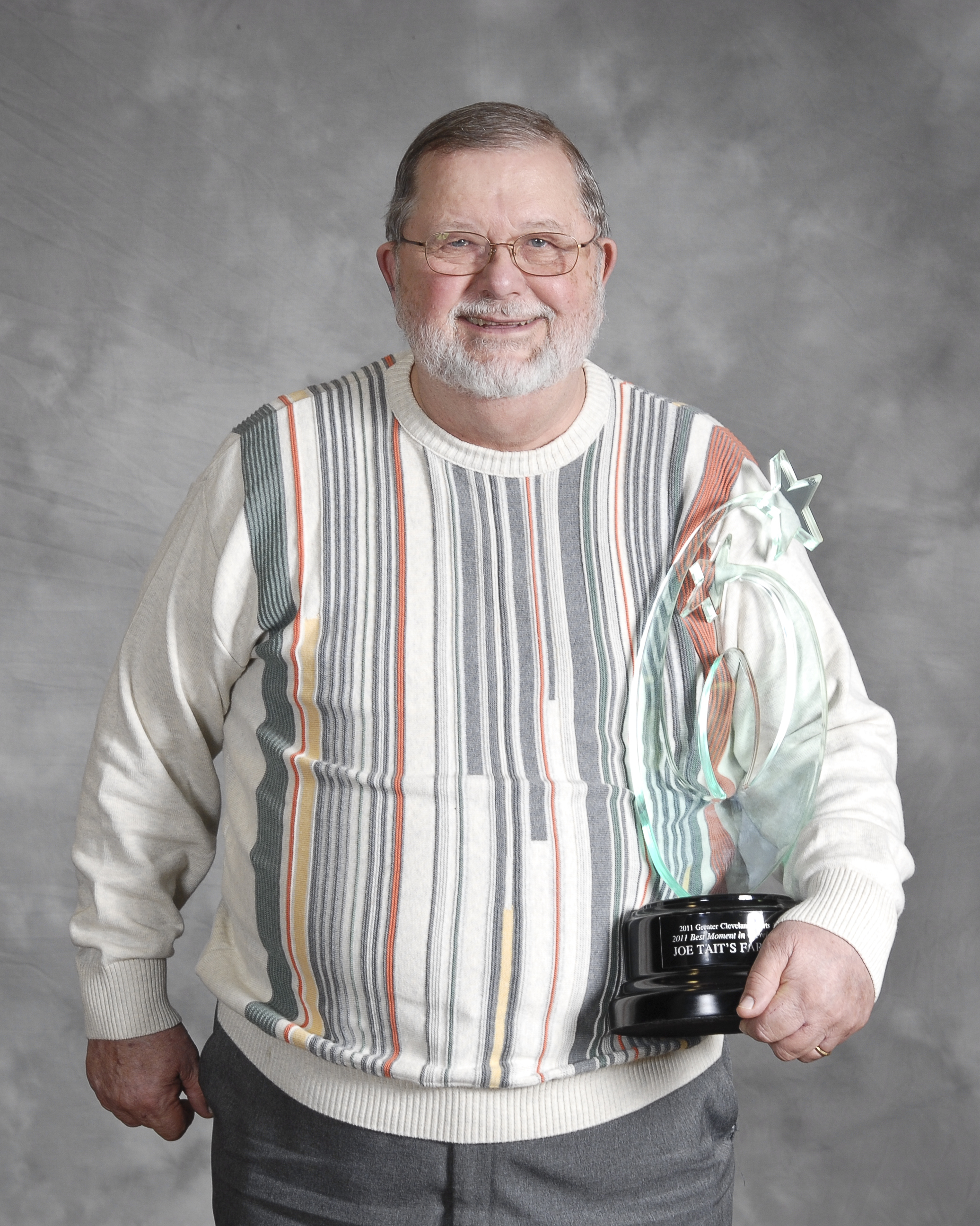
- Tait in 2012
- Born: May 15, 1937; Evanston, Illinois, U.S.
- Died: March 10, 2021 (aged 83); Lafayette Township, Ohio, U.S.
- Sports commentary career
- Teams: Cleveland Cavaliers; Cleveland Indians; Mount Union Purple Raiders; Ohio Bobcats; Indiana Hoosiers
- Genre: Play-by-play
- Sports: Basketball (NBA, WNBA); Baseball (MLB)

Joseph Tait (May 15, 1937 – March 10, 2021) was an American sports broadcaster who was the play-by-play announcer on radio for the Cleveland Cavaliers of the National Basketball Association (NBA) and both TV and radio for the Cleveland Indians of Major League Baseball. With the exception of two seasons in the early 1980s and illness during his final season, he was the Cavaliers' radio announcer from the team's inception in 1970 through the 2010–11 season. He won the Basketball Hall of Fame 2010 Curt Gowdy Media Award.

== Early life and education ==
Tait was born in Evanston, Illinois, and was raised in Amboy, Illinois. Growing up, he played basketball, football and soccer, and also enjoyed writing. He attended Monmouth College in western Illinois, where he began his radio career. He worked various jobs, including play-by-play on a local radio station in Monmouth (WRAM), sports reports, and operations manager. He graduated in 1959. After college, Tait spent three years in the United States Army Security Agency.

After the Army, Tait bounced around, spending time in Decatur, Illinois. From 1966 to 1968 he was the official voice of the Ohio Bobcats, served as sports director for WOUB, and taught sportscasting at the Athens institution. He next served as the network voice of Indiana University football, and was the pre-game host for the Indiana Pacers in 1969, in addition to being the station manager and morning host at WBOW (1230 AM) in Terre Haute, Indiana.

== Career ==
In 1970, Tait began his longtime association with the Cleveland Cavaliers, who were in their first year of existence. The games were broadcast on WERE for the first two years. After then-owner Nick Mileti, who also owned the Cleveland Indians, bought Cleveland's most powerful radio station, WWWE (now WTAM) in 1972, he moved both teams' radio broadcasts to WWWE. Tait was the radio announcer for the Indians from 1973 through 1979 along with Herb Score, and their TV announcer with a variety of partners from 1980 through 1987. However, prior to the 1980-1981 season, new controversial Cavs' team owner Ted Stepien had a disagreement with WWWE. Consequently, the station gave the broadcasting rights back to Stepien, and Tait was released from his job as a result. Yet, many Cleveland fans mistakenly believe that Tait was fired by Stepien, organizing a "Joe Tait Night" during the final home game of the season. The game had the highest attendance of any game in the prior four seasons, and during the game, fans led chants of "Let's go, Joe. Ted must go."

In the interim, Tait was the radio announcer for the New Jersey Nets for the 1981–1982 season. The following year, he switched to television, calling play-by-play Chicago Bulls games on SportsVision, the team's cable-TV station. He also broadcast the CBS Radio College Game-of-the-Week. When new owners Gordon and George Gund III bought the team, Tait returned to the Cavaliers for the 1983-1984 season, and remained until his retirement in 2011. In 1987, he was named vice president of broadcast services, a job that he held until his retirement.

On March 26, 2008, Tait announced his 3000th game for the Cavaliers, against the New Orleans Hornets, where he sat at half court. The radio broadcast location at The Q, at section C126, was renamed "The Joe Tait Perch" in honor of this achievement. In November 2008, Tait signed a two-year contract extension, ensuring that he would be the team's radio voice until at least the 2010–11 season. However, he had a lifetime agreement with the team to serve in some capacity.

In May 2010, the Basketball Hall of Fame announced that Tait would receive the 2010 Curt Gowdy Media Award, which was presented on August 12–13, 2010. On May 17, 2010, WTAM announced that he would retire from broadcasting at the end of the 2011 season. During the 2010 preseason, Tait was hospitalized with pneumonia, and further testing showed he needed heart surgery. This would cause Tait to miss most of the 2010–2011 season. Mike Snyder and Jim Chones were announced as the interim radio team during Tait's recovery. On March 25, 2011, it was announced that Tait would return to call the remaining home games of the season.

On April 8, 2011, in a game against the Chicago Bulls, the Cavaliers honored Tait by having Joe Tait Appreciation Night and by raising a "commemorative banner" with Tait's name, his years as a Cavaliers broadcaster and a microphone next to the other Cavalier retired numbers. Tait's final game was the April 13, 2011, contest between the Cavaliers and Washington Wizards. The Cavaliers sent Tait out as a winner, defeating Washington 100–93.

For fifteen seasons (during the basketball off-season), Tait was also a play-by-play voice for the Cleveland Indians (on the radio from 1973 to 1979, then switching to television from 1980 to 1987). In 1992, he was inducted into the Radio/Television Broadcasters Hall of Fame of Ohio. From 1997 to 2004, Tait also served as the radio play-by-play voice of the Women's National Basketball Association (WNBA) Cleveland Rockers. In 2004, Tait was selected as a founding member of the Indiana Broadcasters Hall of Fame. Beginning in 2008, Tait did play by play for the Mount Union College Purple Raiders, a Division III college football team, on regional cable-TV sports network SportsTime Ohio. He was on the school's board of trustees. He also called high school basketball games for WEOL-AM 930.

In 2011 Tait co-authored his memoir, Joe Tait: It's Been a Real Ball with sports writer Terry Pluto. The book covers his early years in broadcasting, his time with covering the Cleveland Indians and his career with the Cleveland Cavaliers. In July 2019, WEOL-AM 930 launched a weekly podcast with Joe Tait entitled Over the Timeline that served as an overview of his career, and also included audio from Tait's extensive reel-to-reel tape collection.

=== Signature calls ===
- "It's basketball time at the Cleveland Arena/Coliseum/Gund/Q!" – opening for Cavaliers home games
- "Wham with a right/left hand!" – for a Cavaliers slam dunk.
- "To the line, to the lane..." – when a Cavaliers player drives the lane for a basket
- "3-ball...Got it!" – a three-point shot
- "Sights it, shoots it, got it." – for free throw attempts
- "This is Joe Tait. Have a good night everybody!" – what he said to end a broadcast
- "It's a beautiful day/night for baseball!" – what he started every baseball game with

== Personal life ==
Tait married his first wife in 1963. They were married 18 years and had three children, Christina, Karen and Joe. In 1983, he married his second wife, Jean. He and Jean resided in Lafayette Township, Medina County, Ohio.

== Death ==
Tait died in his home under hospice care March 10, 2021, after a lengthy battle with cancer. He was 83.

== Awards and honors ==
- Eight-time NSSA Ohio Sportscaster of the Year (1974, 1976, 1978, 1991, 1996, 1999, 2002, 2003)
- Cleveland Association of Broadcasters Hall of Fame Inductee (class of 1997)
- Ohio Broadcasters Hall of Fame Inductee (class of 1992)
- Indiana Broadcasters Hall of Fame Inductee (class of 2004)
- 2010 Basketball Hall of Fame Curt Gowdy Media Award
- 2012 OAC Bill Nichols Media Award
- Cleveland Press Club Journalism Hall of Fame Inductee (class of 2003)
- Greater Cleveland Sports Hall of Fame Inductee (class of 2005)
- "Voice of the Cavaliers" banner honoring his Cavs career included with the Cavaliers' retired numbers at Rocket Arena
- Radio announcers booth at Rocket Arena renamed "The Joe Tait Perch"
- Broadcast booth at University of Mount Union renamed the "Joe Tait Broadcast Booth"
- Cavaliers Wall of Honor (class of 2019)

== Bibliography ==
- Tait, Joe; Pluto, Terry (2011). Joe Tait: It's Been a Real Ball. Gray & Co. ISBN 978-1-59851-070-6.
