= Pableaux Johnson =

American writer and photographer (1966–2025)

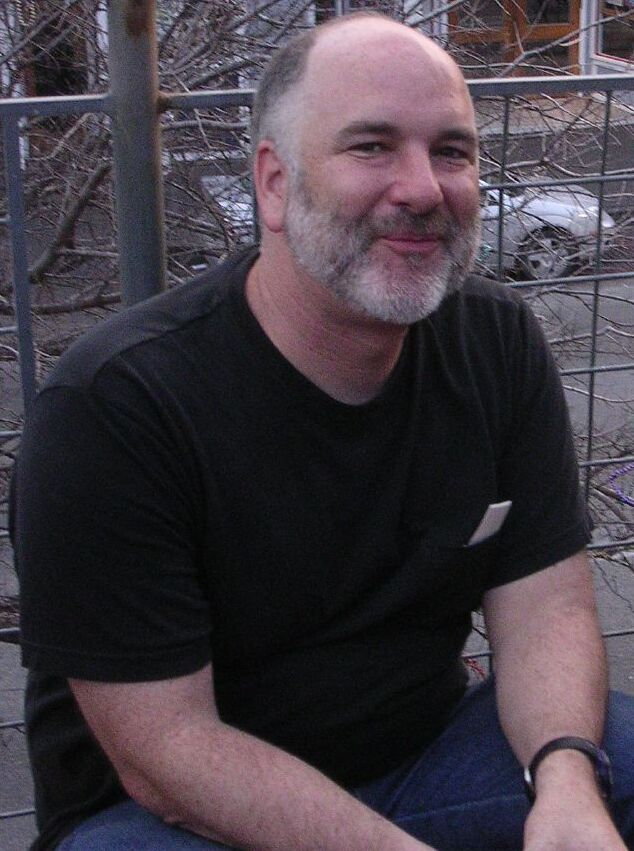
- Johnson in 2006
- Born: January 8, 1966; Trenton, New Jersey, U.S.
- Died: January 26, 2025 (aged 59); New Orleans, Louisiana, U.S.
- Education: Trinity University (Texas)
- Occupations: Writer; photographer; filmmaker; cook; designer
- Spouse: Ariana French (m. 2003–2006)
- Awards: James Beard Foundation Award

Pableaux Johnson (born Paul Michael Johnson, January 8, 1966 – January 26, 2025) was an American writer, photographer, filmmaker, cook, and designer whose work focused on the food and culture of New Orleans.

== Background ==
Johnson was born on January 8, 1966, in Trenton, New Jersey, then named Paul Michael Johnson. Before he was seven, after his parents divorced, his mother moved, with Paul and two sisters, to New Iberia, Louisiana, where he grew up. He attended Trinity University in San Antonio, Texas. There he changed his first name from Paul to Pableaux, to honor both his Latino friends and his French Cajun roots, and graduated in 1988, having studied history, religion, and sociology. After a few years of "bouncing between San Francisco, Europe and Oxford, Mississippi", Johnson moved to Austin, Texas, where he lived for about 10 years, working as a freelance food writer. He moved from Austin to New Orleans in 2001.

== Writing ==
Johnson published four books, on New Orleans generally, New Orleans food, and football tailgate cooking.

He also wrote for numerous publications including (with a date range of his articles in each, where available):

- The Austin Chronicle (1995–2001)
- The Bitter Southerner (2015)
- Bon Appétit (2006–2008)
- Cooking Light (2001, 2012)
- Culinary Backstreets (2022–2025)
- Food & Wine
- Garden & Gun (2012–2015)
- Gambit Weekly (now Gambit) (2003)
- Gourmet (magazine) (2009)
- Houston Press (2002–2003)
- Imbibe (2015–2019)
- The Kitchn (2017–2025)
- The New York Times (2004–2025)
- Rouses Markets (2014–2018)
- Saveur (2006–2019)
- Southern Living (2018–2024)
- Texas Monthly (1997–1999)

== Photography ==
Johnson's photographs, particularly of New Orleans Mardi Gras Indians and second-line parades, were exhibited in museums and galleries around the United States, and published.

An exhibit of his photographs, "Of the Nation: New Orleans Mardi Gras Indians 2014," was displayed at the University of Mississippi's Center for the Study of Southern Culture, in Oxford, Mississippi, in October 2014, and at the LeFevre Art Gallery at The Ohio State University at Newark from autumn 2015 to January 2016.

The Fowler Museum at UCLA displayed an exhibit entitled "New Orleans Second Line Parades: Photographs by Pableaux Johnson," from December 16, 2018, to April 28, 2019. The exhibit was later displayed at the Center for the Study of the American South, in Chapel Hill, until December 2019.

Johnson published a series of photographs called "Second Line Sunday: New Orleans Street Dance" on LensCulture, the Dutch photography magazine and website.

A 14-photograph slide show of his photos illustrated a 2013 New York Times piece about Louisiana king cakes. His photography was featured in other publications, including Gambit.

== Red Beans Roadshow ==
For several years Johnson ran the Red Beans Roadshow, a traveling operation which brought New Orleans cuisine, and specifically red beans and rice, to "pop–up" events in restaurants around the country. (An ad for one of the events described his role in it as "wiseass/cook.") For example, there was an event in Nashville in October 2015, and a summer 2016 tour of mostly south-eastern U.S. cities. It appeared in 2024 that the Red Beans Roadshow ended around the time of the COVID-19 pandemic, since at that time the last online advertisement was for an event held in February 2020, in Dallas.

After a several-year hiatus, Johnson resumed the Red Beans Roadshow in January 2025 with an event scheduled in Nashville for January 11. The Roadshow's Square website announced that the Nashville event was rescheduled to January 18, and that others were held in Atlanta on January 13 and Athens, Georgia, on January 14. Another Roadshow website posted a map, indicating plans for 2025 events with legs in, in addition to the Southeast, the Northeast (e.g., Boston, New York, Washington), the "Cold North" (e.g.,Toronto, Chicago, Cleveland), Texas (e.g., Houston, Dallas, San Antonio), Central (e.g., Birmingham, Louisville, Kansas City), the West (e.g., Seattle, Denver, Los Angeles), and International (London).

== Documentary filmmaking ==
Johnson was credited as a co-producer and still photographer for two companion documentary films about New Orleans Mardi Gras Indians, The Spirit Leads My Needle: The Big Chiefs of Carnival and It's Your Glory: The Big Queens of Carnival. Largely made by students at Ohio State University-Newark as service learning projects, New Orleans public television WYES-TV premiered the two documentaries in January 2016 and broadcast them through that February. WYES re-broadcast them around Mardi Gras in 2021, 2022 (at least "Big Chiefs," which it described as among "Carnival classic programs"), and 2023. They were also broadcast on WOUB-TV in Athens, Ohio. "Big Queens" was nominated for a regional Emmy.

== Home and community cooking ==
As a weekly tradition that received significant media coverage, on Monday evenings when he was in town, Johnson cooked dinner—red beans and rice, cornbread, and "whiskey for dessert"—at his New Orleans home for a "rotating ensemble" of about ten to twelve "friends and friends of friends." In 16 years, he never had the same group, Johnson wrote in 2018. Johnson said about what to call the event, "When people describe the gathering as a salon or a dinner party, I almost always correct them. It is just people getting together and talking. It’s supper, not a dinner party."

From 2010, between Thanksgiving and Christmas, Johnson served as "Gumbo Claus," collecting many turkey carcasses and turning them into turkey stock which he uses to make "around 50 gallons of smoky gumbo" for friends.

== Character ==
When writers described Johnson in brief, they usually picked a word or phrase, often in French, for someone who is fun to be around: "raconteur," or "bon vivant," or "first order gadabout," or "beloved."

== Death ==
Johnson died on January 26, 2025, at the age of 59, after suffering a heart attack and collapsing while photographing the Ladies and Men of Unity second-line parade in New Orleans.

== Recognition ==
- Johnson's article "End of the Lines?" was nominated for the 2004 James Beard Foundation Award for Newspaper Feature Writing About Restaurants and/or Chefs.
- Johnson's book World Food New Orleans won the Jacob's Creek World Media Award (silver)
- Johnson's book Eating New Orleans was nominated for a 2007 Le Cordon Bleu World Media Award
- Johnson's article "Everyday Sacred: A Personal Path to Gumbo" was included in the anthology Best Food Writing 2016
- A documentary film co-produced by Johnson, It’s Your Glory: Big Queens of the Carnival was nominated for a Suncoast regional Emmy, for best cultural documentary, in 2016.
- Epicurious named Johnson as one of the "100 Best Home Cooks of All Time" in 2017
- Johnson was among the top ten nominees for "Best Cocktail and Spirits Writer," Tales of the Cocktail Spirited Awards 2018
- 11 days prior to his death in 2025, the Louisiana Endowment for the Humanities awarded Johnson as its Documentary Photographer of the Year for his longtime work photographing Mardi Gras Second Line parades, Black Masking Indians, and Louisiana culture.

== Bibliography ==
=== Books ===
- Johnson, P. (2001). Legends of New Orleans: Blue Marble's Music and Guidebook. Blue Marble Music.
- Johnson, P. (2005). Eating New Orleans: From French Quarter Creole Dining to the Perfect Poboy. Countryman Press. ISBN 9780881506297.
- Johnson, P. (2007). Gameday gourmet: More than 80 all-American tailgate recipes. ESPN Books. ISBN 9781933060156.
- Johnson, P.; O’Brien, C. (2000). World Food New Orleans. Lonely Planet. ISBN 9781864501100.

=== Published works ===
- Bertin, M.; Earvolino, P.; Gillespie, S.; Harwick, J.; Johnson, P.; Messer, K.; Phillips, M.; Robinson, B.; Willis, K. (November 14, 1997). "The Copper Tank". The Austin Chronicle. Vol. 17, no. 11. ISSN 1074-0740.
- Bertin, M.; Earvolino, P.; Gillespie, S.; Harwick, J.; Johnson, P.; Messer, K.; Phillips, M.; Robinson, B.; Willis, K. (November 14, 1997). "The Draught Horse". The Austin Chronicle. Vol. 17, no. 11. ISSN 1074-0740.
- Bertin, M.; Earvolino, P.; Gillespie, S.; Harwick, J.; Johnson, P.; Messer, K.; Phillips, M.; Robinson, B.; Willis, K. (November 14, 1997). "The Waterloo Brewing Company & American Grill". The Austin Chronicle. Vol. 17, no. 11. ISSN 1074-0740.
- Donovan, L.; Johnson, P. (2025). "Skillet cornbread". The New York Times.
- Johnson, P. (n.d.). "Appetite for destruction". Texas Monthly. ISSN 0148-7736.
- Johnson, P. (n.d.). "Flea market master class". Texas Monthly. ISSN 0148-7736.
- Johnson, P. (n.d.). "Wild creation". The Bitter Southerner. ISSN 2998-8152.
- Johnson, P. (December 1, 1995). "Cafe 290". The Austin Chronicle. Vol. 15, no. 14. ISSN 1074-0740.
- Johnson, P. (December 8, 1995). "Acapulco Video Taqueria". The Austin Chronicle. Vol. 15, no. 15. ISSN 1074-0740.
- Johnson, P. (January 5, 1996). "Top Ten "Eat Your Own Weight" Foods". The Austin Chronicle. Vol. 15, no. 18. ISSN 1074-0740.
- Johnson, P. (January 12, 1996). "Longhorn Po-Boys and Falafel". The Austin Chronicle. Vol. 15, no. 19. ISSN 1074-0740.
- Johnson, P. (January 19, 1996). "El Gallo Jiro". The Austin Chronicle. Vol. 15, no. 20. ISSN 1074-0740.
- Johnson, P. (July 12, 1996). "Tune in to tapas". The Austin Chronicle. Vol. 15, no. 45. ISSN 1074-0740.
- Johnson, P. (July 19, 1996). "Austin's brewpub bargains". The Austin Chronicle. Vol. 15, no. 46. ISSN 1074-0740.
- Johnson, P. (November 8, 1996). "Threadgill's: The Cookbook". The Austin Chronicle. Vol. 16, no. 10. ISSN 1074-0740.
- Johnson, P. (November 15, 1996). "Rocky mountain high". The Austin Chronicle. Vol. 16, no. 11. ISSN 1074-0740.
- Johnson, P. (February 1, 1997). "Mac attack". Texas Monthly. Vol. 25, no. 2. p. 28. ISSN 0148-7736.
- Johnson, P. (March 7, 1997). "Out-of-town barbecue". The Austin Chronicle. Vol. 16, no. 27. ISSN 1074-0740.
- Johnson, P. (April 25, 1997). "Neighborhood Italian". The Austin Chronicle. Vol. 16, no. 34. ISSN 1074-0740.
- Johnson, P. (June 20, 1997). "Burgers, burgers everywhere". The Austin Chronicle. Vol. 16, no. 42. ISSN 1074-0740.
- Johnson, P. (July 18, 1997). "Getting the shakes". The Austin Chronicle. Vol. 16, no. 46. ISSN 1074-0740.
- Johnson, P. (July 18, 1997). "Let it sno, let it sno". The Austin Chronicle. Vol. 16, no. 46. ISSN 1074-0740.
- Johnson, P. (September 1, 1997). "Review: Hot beer". Texas Monthly. Vol. 25, no. 9. p. 24.
- Johnson, P. (September 5, 1997). "Chinese à la carts". The Austin Chronicle. Vol. 17, no. 1. ISSN 1074-0740.
- Johnson, P. (October 31, 1997). "Perfect game plan". The Austin Chronicle. Vol. 17, no. 9. ISSN 1074-0740.
- Johnson, P. (January 1, 1998). "Prickly: Cactus as cash crop? Just say nopalito". Texas Monthly. Vol. 26, no. 1. p. 24. ISSN 0148-7736.
- Johnson, P. (January 30, 1998). "The burger search continues". The Austin Chronicle. Vol. 17, no. 21. ISSN 1074-0740.
- Johnson, P. (April 10, 1998). "Favoring curry". The Austin Chronicle. Vol. 17, no. 31. ISSN 1074-0740.
- Johnson, P. (April 24, 1998). "Glass of '93". The Austin Chronicle. Vol. 17, no. 33. ISSN 1074-0740.
- Johnson, P. (May 22, 1998). "Attention to detail". The Austin Chronicle. Vol. 17, no. 37. ISSN 1074-0740.
- Johnson, P. (November 27, 1998). "Whisks up". The Austin Chronicle. Vol. 18, no. 13. ISSN 1074-0740.
- Johnson, P. (December 18, 1998). "Visions of sugar(plums)". The Austin Chronicle. Vol. 18, no. 16. ISSN 1074-0740.
- Johnson, P. (January 15, 1999). "Rural Kraut". The Austin Chronicle. Vol. 18, no. 20. ISSN 1074-0740.
- Johnson, P. (January 29, 1999). "The Coffeehouse Chronicles: Captain Quackenbush's Intergalactic Coffee House and Espresso Bar". The Austin Chronicle. Vol. 18, no. 22. ISSN 1074-0740.
- Johnson, P. (February 5, 1999). "Gumbo weather: Winter warmup, Cajun-style". The Austin Chronicle. Vol. 18, no. 25. ISSN 1074-0740.
- Johnson, P. (February 19, 1999). "How to Cook Everything: Simple Recipes for Great Food by Mark Bittman". The Austin Chronicle. Vol. 18, no. 25. ISSN 1074-0740.
- Johnson, P. (March 19, 1999). "Bitter End Bistro & Brewery". The Austin Chronicle. Vol. 18, no. 29. ISSN 1074-0740.
- Johnson, P. (March 19, 1999). "Copper Tank". The Austin Chronicle. Vol. 18, no. 29. ISSN 1074-0740.
- Johnson, P. (March 19, 1999). "Waterloo Brewing Company". The Austin Chronicle. Vol. 18, no. 29. ISSN 1074-0740.
- Johnson, P. (April 1, 1999). "The big easier". Texas Monthly. Vol. 27, no. 4. p. 66. ISSN 0148-7736.
- Johnson, P. (May 21, 1999). "Rudy's BBQ". The Austin Chronicle. Vol. 18, no. 38. ISSN 1074-0740.
- Johnson, P. (June 11, 1999). "Brukulino, America: Remembrances of Sicilian-American Brooklyn, Told in Stories and Recipes, by Vincent Schiavelli". The Austin Chronicle. Vol. 18, no. 41. ISSN 1074-0740.
- Johnson, P. (July 9, 1999). "Custody Cuisine". The Austin Chronicle. Vol. 18, no. 45. ISSN 1074-0740.
- Johnson, P. (July 30, 1999). "Automat". The Austin Chronicle. Vol. 18, no. 48. ISSN 1074-0740.
- Johnson, P. (September 17, 1999). "The Coffeehouse Chronicles: Ruta Maya Coffee Company". The Austin Chronicle. Vol. 19, no. 3. ISSN 1074-0740.
- Johnson, P. (November 5, 1999). "The Coffeehouse Chronicles: Flipnotics Coffeespace Cafe". The Austin Chronicle. Vol. 19, no. 10. ISSN 1074-0740.
- Johnson, P. (November 12, 1999). "The Coffeehouse Chronicles: Gaby & Mo's". The Austin Chronicle. Vol. 19, no. 11. ISSN 1074-0740.
- Johnson, P. (December 3, 1999). "Standout Sister Act". The Austin Chronicle. Vol. 19, no. 14. ISSN 1074-0740.
- Johnson, P. (December 17, 1999). "Cooking Fearlessly: Recipes and Other Adventures from Hudson's on the Bend". The Austin Chronicle. Vol. 19, no. 16. ISSN 1074-0740.
- Johnson, P. (December 24, 1999). "The keeper of the nog". The Austin Chronicle. Vol. 19, no. 17. ISSN 1074-0740.
- Johnson, P. (February 18, 2000). "Mojo's Daily Grind". The Austin Chronicle. Vol. 19, no. 25. ISSN 1074-0740.
- Johnson, P. (March 3, 2000). "Broken Spoke". The Austin Chronicle. Vol. 19, no. 27. ISSN 1074-0740.
- Johnson, P. (March 17, 2000). "Casino El Camino". The Austin Chronicle. Vol. 19, no. 29. ISSN 1074-0740.
- Johnson, P. (March 24, 2000). "Culinaria: The United States: A Culinary Discovery". The Austin Chronicle. Vol. 19, no. 30. ISSN 1074-0740.
- Johnson, P. (April 14, 2000). "The Coffeehouse Chronicles: Austin Java Company". The Austin Chronicle. Vol. 19, no. 33. ISSN 1074-0740.
- Johnson, P. (April 21, 2000). "True to their (new) roots". The Austin Chronicle. Vol. 19, no. 34. ISSN 1074-0740.
- Johnson, P. (May 26, 2000). "Will travel for food". The Austin Chronicle. Vol. 19, no. 39. ISSN 1074-0740.
- Johnson, P. (June 2, 2000). "The King of Hops Returns". The Austin Chronicle. Vol. 19, no. 40. ISSN 1074-0740.
- Johnson, P. (June 9, 2000). "Zoot suits". The Austin Chronicle. Vol. 19, no. 41. ISSN 1074-0740.
- Johnson, P. (June 16, 2000). "The Coffeehouse Chronicles: Cafe Mundi". The Austin Chronicle. Vol. 19, no. 42. ISSN 1074-0740.
- Johnson, P. (July 7, 2000). "Hudson's on the Bend". The Austin Chronicle. Vol. 19, no. 45. ISSN 1074-0740.
- Johnson, P. (August 25, 2000). "Hitting the sauce". The Austin Chronicle. Vol. 19, no. 52. ISSN 1074-0740.
- Johnson, P. (October 13, 2000). "First round draft picks". The Austin Chronicle. Vol. 20, no. 7. ISSN 1074-0740.
- Johnson, P. (November 24, 2000). "A place, a time, a memory: The meaning of Thanksgiving". The Austin Chronicle. Vol. 20, no. 13. ISSN 1074-0740.
- Johnson, P. (December 15, 2000). "Eating between the lines". The Austin Chronicle. Vol. 20, no. 16. ISSN 1074-0740.
- Johnson, P. (February 23, 2001). "The French Kitchen Cooking School". The Austin Chronicle. Vol. 20, no. 26. ISSN 1074-0740.
- Johnson, P. (June 8, 2001). "Diverse portfolio". The Austin Chronicle. Vol. 20, no. 41. ISSN 1074-0740.
- Johnson, P. (July 13, 2001). "Farewell fix". The Austin Chronicle. Vol. 20, no. 46. ISSN 1074-0740.
- Johnson, P.; de la Garza, V. (April 1, 2001). "Fruit of the desert". Cooking Light. Vol. 15, no. 3. p. 188.
- Johnson, P. (March 21, 2002). "Better by design: Seven months and $3 million later, the eatery at the Four Seasons emerges even better than before". Houston Press. Vol. 14, no. 12.
- Johnson, P. (August 15, 2002). "The family formula: It's just another Tuesday night at Lopez Mexican Restaurant". Houston Press. Vol. 14, no. 33.
- Johnson, P. (March 4, 2003). "End of the lines? Bad knees, great seafood and retirement on the horizon. It's another working day at Uglesich's Restaurant and Bar". Gambit Weekly. Vol. 24, no. 10.
- Johnson, P. (June 23, 2003). "Food news". Gambit Weekly.
- Johnson, P. (June 30, 2003). "Food news". Gambit Weekly.
- Johnson, P. (July 1, 2003). "Fried, soaked and savory: R&O's Pizza provides a gravy-soaked lesson in New Orleans' edible history". Gambit Weekly. Vol. 24, no. 27.
- Johnson, P. (July 7, 2003). "Food news". Gambit Weekly.
- Johnson, P. (July 8, 2003). "Fishing with Frank". Gambit Weekly. Vol. 24, no. 28.
- Johnson, P. (July 14, 2003). "Slice of life: GW Fins fish butcher Mike Bouvier lives on the cutting edge of seafood". Gambit Weekly. Vol. 24, no. 9.
- Johnson, P. (September 8, 2003). "In the cups: The almost impossibly refreshing Pimm's Cup is the perfect late-summer survival tool". Gambit Weekly. Vol. 24, no. 37.
- Johnson, P. (September 18, 2003). "Up for a Spin: At Spindletop, it's the view, not the food, that dazzles". Houston Press. Vol. 15, no. 38.
- Johnson, P. (May 11, 2004). "Hash browns". The New York Times.
- Johnson, P. (May 12, 2004). "Duck steeped in New Orleans traditions". The New York Times.
- Johnson, P. (July 21, 2004). "$20 to Spend, Surrounded by Ripeness". The New York Times.
- Johnson, P. (November 5, 2004). "In Baton Rouge, La". The New York Times. pp. F4.
- Johnson, P.; Sonnier, G. (May 11, 2004). "Slow Roasted Duck With Orange-Sherry Sauce". The New York Times.
- Johnson, P. (March 11, 2005). "Vieques, far from the lounge-chair crowd". The New York Times.
- Johnson, P. (March 18, 2005). "A relaxed jewel of the Caribbean". The New York Times.
- Johnson, P. (March 25, 2005). "Hot Springs, Ark". The New York Times.
- Johnson, P. (April 10, 2005). "Going to New Orleans". The New York Times.
- Johnson, P. (August 14, 2005). "Siena, one step ahead of the crowd". The New York Times.
- Johnson, P. (August 18, 2005). "Siena: More than a notch on a tourist belt". The New York Times.
- Johnson, P. (September 21, 2005). "Fresh start, with chain saw and foie gras". The New York Times.
- Johnson, P. (October 9, 2005). "Hotel Reopenings". The New York Times.
- Johnson, P. (October 14, 2005). "Hotel Reopenings". The New York Times.
- Johnson, P. (October 21, 2005). "Hotel Reopenings". The New York Times.
- Johnson, P. (October 28, 2005). "Hotel Reopenings". The New York Times.
- Johnson, P. (November 11, 2005). "Hotel Reopenings". The New York Times.
- Johnson, P. (November 18, 2005). "Hotel Reopenings". The New York Times.
- Johnson, P. (November 25, 2005). "36 hours in Astoria, Ore". The New York Times.
- Johnson, P. (January 22, 2006). "Comeback of the year: New Orleans". The New York Times. p. 15.
- Johnson, P. (March 1, 2006). "Is blackened redfish really Cajun? Do we care?". Saveur. No. 91. p. 30.
- Johnson, P. (May 1, 2006). "Where comfort food is the plat du jour". The New York Times.
- Johnson, P. (May 3, 2006). "Some new faces, and many familiar ones, at a New Orleans tradition". The New York Times.
- Johnson, P. (June 16, 2006). "In Oregon, a cherry jubilee". The New York Times.
- Johnson, P. (August 1, 2006). "The restaurant reporter". Bon Appétit. Vol. 51, no. 8. p. 55.
- Johnson, P. (August 23, 2006). "The aroma of garlic is back on the Bayou". The New York Times.
- Johnson, P. (November 24, 2006). "Church bells and bike bells in a two-wheel town". The New York Times.
- Johnson, P. (November 26, 2006). "Sounds of vitality for New Orleans". The New York Times.
- Johnson, P. (November 29, 2006). "Raise a mixed drink for dear old State U." The New York Times.
- Johnson, P.; Knowlton, A. (August 1, 2006). "New Orleans: Reborn". Bon Appétit. Vol. 51, no. 8. p. 58.
- Johnson, P. (February 9, 2007). "Still room in New Orleans". The New York Times.
- Johnson, P. (March 11, 2007). "Louisville, Ky.: 21c Hotel Museum". The New York Times.
- Johnson, P. (May 2, 2007). "And now, a sip of history: The mint julep, personified". The New York Times.
- Johnson, P. (March 31, 2008). "New Orleans". Bon Appétit.
- Johnson, P. (June 25, 2008). "A sip of history: Southern food historian Amy Evans explores Louisville barroom culture". Courier-Journal.
- Johnson, P. (September 17, 2008). "Fred's famous tar heel chili". Epicurious.
- Johnson, P. (September 17, 2008). "Bratwurst in beer". Epicurious.
- Johnson, P. (September 18, 2008). "Blue devil cheese and bacon dip". Epicurious.
- Johnson, P. (September 18, 2008). "Hurry-up black bean dip". Epicurious.
- Johnson, P. (September 18, 2008). "Peanut butter buckeyes". Epicurious.
- Johnson, P. (September 18, 2008). "Smokin' chipotle pork stew". Epicurious.
- Johnson, P. (February 13, 2009). "New Orleans: Cochon Butcher". Gourmet.
- Johnson, P. (February 26, 2009). "Mardi Gras' last sinful supper". Gourmet.
- Johnson, P. (June 12, 2009). "Atlanta: Abattoir". Gourmet.
- Johnson, P. (June 19, 2009). "Raleigh, NC: Gravy". Gourmet.
- Johnson, P. (November 1, 2008). "Roast pork with garlic-onion gravy". Southern Living. Vol. 43, no. 11. p. 78. ISSN 0038-4305.
- Johnson, P. (February 4, 2011). "In New Orleans, Early Mardi Gras Parades Are Family Fare". The New York Times.
- Johnson, P. (March 1, 2012). "Classic cocktail: The Ramos gin fizz". Garden & Gun.
- Johnson, P. (March 1, 2012). "Classic cocktail: The Sazerac". Garden & Gun.
- Johnson, P. (March 1, 2012). "The Pimm's cup: Bar Tonique's recipe". Garden & Gun.
- Johnson, P. (March 29, 2012). "In New Orleans, Hotels Lure a Local Fan Base". The New York Times.
- Johnson, P. (May 23, 2012). "Postcard: Memphis". The New York Times.
- Johnson, P. (November 1, 2012). "Can't ever keep a good food town down". Cooking Light. Vol. 26, no. 10. p. 36.
- Johnson, P. (April 5, 2013). "Family style". Saveur. No. 155. p. 53. ISSN 1075-7864.
- Johnson, P. (March 1, 2014). "Love at first bite". My Rouses Everyday.
- Johnson, P. (May 1, 2014). "Best in glass". My Rouses Everyday.
- Johnson, P. (May 1, 2014). "Daisies, slings & fizzies". My Rouses Everyday.
- Johnson, P. (July 1, 2014). "Louisiana breakfast shrimp". My Rouses Everyday. p. 13.
- Johnson, P. (July 1, 2014). "Tex-Mex". My Rouses Everyday.
- Johnson, P. (July 22, 2014). "In praise of the trusty rice cooker". The New York Times.
- Johnson, P. (November 1, 2014). "Gumbo crazy". My Rouses Everyday.
- Johnson, P.; McMillian, C. (2014). "Mint julep". The New York Times.
- Johnson, P. (March 1, 2015). "Cocktail curiosities". Garden & Gun.
- Johnson, P. (December 15, 2015). "Brandy milk punch: A New Orleans original". Imbibe. No. 58.
- Johnson, P. (2016). "Everyday Sacred: A Personal Path to Gumbo". Serious Eats. Archived from the original on May 16, 2021.
- Johnson, P. (March 1, 2016). "Classics combined, then refined". My Rouses Everyday.
- Johnson, P. (July 18, 2016). "Day drinking in New Orleans". Imbibe.
- Johnson, P. (August 16, 2016). "How to avoid a hangover in New Orleans". Extra Crispy. Archived from the original on February 18, 2018.
- Johnson, P. (October 6, 2016). "Home and away: Looking back at the Red Beans Roadshow (summer edition)". Tastes Like Home: The Camellia Bean Blog.
- Johnson, P. (November 1, 2016). "Gumbo & the Gulf Coast". My Rouses Everyday.
- Johnson, P. (February 24, 2017). "How To Make Red Beans & Rice in an Electric Pressure Cooker". The Kitchn. Archived from the original on February 27, 2017.
- Johnson, P. (March 1, 2017). "Slice of life". My Rouses Everyday.
- Johnson, P. (March 1, 2017). "Smokin' hot". My Rouses Everyday.
- Johnson, P. (March 1, 2017). "The Texas crutch". My Rouses Everyday.
- Johnson, P. (March 13, 2017). "Come for the guest rooms. Stay for the art galleries". The New York Times.
- Johnson, P. (April 4, 2017). "The frozen margarita: A Texas summer staple". Imbibe.
- Johnson, P. (April 14, 2017). "Monday night red beans & rice". The Splendid Table.
- Johnson, P. (May 1, 2017). "Coffee milk". My Rouses Everyday.
- Johnson, P. (May 1, 2017). "The daily grind". My Rouses Everyday.
- Johnson, P. (May 8, 2017). "Beyond the Derby: Louisville's everyday culinary treasures". The Kitchn. Archived from the original on May 11, 2017.
- Johnson, P. (May 29, 2017). "Miracle onion rice". My Rouses Everyday.
- Johnson, P. (June 28, 2017). "Between the bread". My Rouses Everyday.
- Johnson, P. (June 28, 2017). "Caramelized onions". My Rouses Everyday.
- Johnson, P. (October 30, 2017). "Eggnog". My Rouses Everyday.
- Johnson, P. (October 30, 2017). "Traditions & superstitions". My Rouses Everyday.
- Johnson, P. (October 31, 2017). "Five alarm fryer". My Rouses Everyday.
- Johnson, P. (January 1, 2018). "The Po'Boy Tour of New Orleans". Southern Living. Vol. 53, no. 1. p. 101.
- Johnson, P. (January 2, 2018). "Indians: Here they come". My Rouses Everyday.
- Johnson, P. (February 13, 2018). "Why king cake matters to New Orleans even though it isn't always good". Extra Crispy. Archived from the original on March 5, 2021.
- Johnson, P. (March 6, 2018). "Whiskey for dessert". Imbibe.
- Johnson, P. (August 27, 2018). "My grandmother's table". My Rouses Everyday.
- Johnson, P. (August 28, 2018). "Joe's spaghetti po". My Rouses Everyday.
- Johnson, P. (August 28, 2018). "Rice & gravy". My Rouses Everyday.
- Johnson, P. (August 28, 2018). "The recipe box". My Rouses Everyday.
- Johnson, P. (January 8, 2019). "Lunch at this iconic New Orleans restaurant includes a fried chicken avalanche". Saveur. ISSN 1075-7864.
- Johnson, P. (May 24, 2019). "How Louisville turned a New Yorker into a Top Chef". The Kitchn.
- Johnson, P. (July 25, 2019). "An ode to the boozy slushie". Imbibe.
- Johnson, P. (2020). "Forty Sundays a Year: New Orleans Second Line Parades". Southern Cultures. 26 (1): 82–99. doi:10.1353/scu.2020.0013.
- Johnson, P. (March 27, 2020). "A New Orleans Chef is Sharing What Living Through Katrina Taught Her About Community". Southern Living. Archived from the original on January 24, 2022.
- Johnson, P. (February 1, 2022). "Good things. Small bottles. Family spirit: This up-and-coming fam biz brings the legendary syrup". Family Business.
- Johnson, P. (February 1, 2022). "Laissez les BON TEMPS rouler". Family Business.
- Johnson, P. (February 17, 2022). "New Orleans: State of the stomach 202". Culinary Backstreets.
- Johnson, P. (February 24, 2022). "Seafood Sally's: The neo retro Gulf boil". Culinary Backstreets.
- Johnson, P. (March 1, 2022). "Family business startup is all about the biscuits". Family Business. Vol. 33, no. 2. p. 11.
- Johnson, P. (May 1, 2022). "Toasting family traditions". Family Business. Vol. 33, no. 3. p. 11.
- Johnson, P. (February 21, 2023). "Second-line Sunday vendors: What you need, when you need it". Culinary Backstreets.
- Johnson, P. (December 11, 2023). "Why the po'boys at Parkway Bakery and Tavern are the best in New Orleans". Southern Living.
- Johnson, P. (February 13, 2024). "Bywater bakery: Sugar-coated community center". Culinary Backstreets.
- Johnson, P. (June 7, 2024). "The 6 best po'boys in New Orleans". Southern Living.
- Johnson, P. (January 17, 2025). "Pableaux's Monday night red beans". Lodge Cast Iron.
- Johnson, P. (January 27, 2025). "Monday night red beans and rice". Food & Wine.
- Johnson, P. (May 21, 2025). "Red beans and rice". The Kitchn.
- Johnson, P. (August 27, 2025). "R&O's: The power of the po'boy". Culinary Backstreets.
- Severson, K.; Johnson, P. (September 21, 2005). "In New Orleans, cooks are stirring". The New York Times.
- Severson, K.; Moskin, J.; Johnson, P. (September 6, 2005). "Crawfish Étouffée goes into exile". The New York Times.
- Severson, K.; Johnson, P. (March 19, 2025). "Red Beans and Rice". The New York Times.

=== Photographs ===
- Johnson, P. (n.d.). "Second Line Sunday: New Orleans Street Dance [Photographs]". Lens Culture.
- Johnson, P. (December 28, 2009). "Jack "Skippy" McFadden [Photograph]". The New York Times.
- Johnson, P. (April 1, 2012). "Carousel Bar at the Hotel Monteleone [Photograph]". The New York Times.
- Johnson, P. (January 24, 2013). "Dwight Henry's role in "Beasts" hasn't kept him from his job as owner of the Buttermilk Drop Bakery and Cafe [Photograph]". The New York Times.
- Johnson, P. (January 30, 2013). "A doberge king cake from the baker Debbie Does Doberge in New Orleans [Photograph]". The New York Times.
- Johnson, P. (June 25, 2013). "The author Brett Martin [Photograph]". The New York Times.
- Johnson, P. (October 15, 2013). "Kim Severson, left, and Kat Kinsman [Photograph]". The New York Times.
- Johnson, P. (November 23, 2013). "John Egerton [Photograph]". The New York Times.
- Johnson, P. (August 27, 2015). "Betty Bell, 73, has waited more than a decade to rebuild her home in New Orleans' Lower Ninth Ward neighborhood [Photograph]". Huffpost.
- Johnson, P. (September 15, 2015). "Toni Tipton-Martin, a journalist who uses reporting on cultural heritage and cooking for social change, will be the new editor in chief of Cook's Country [Photograph]". The New York Times.
- Johnson, P. (2016). "Francis Lam [Photograph]". 2nd & Church. No. Winter. p. 64.
- Johnson, P. (April 17, 2016). "Manuel Gonzales [Photograph]". The New York Times.
- Johnson, P. (March 3, 2019). "Mardi Gras king cake [Photograph]". The New York Times.
- Johnson, P. (May 1, 2019). "Brett Martin [Photograph]". GQ. Vol. 89, no. 4.
- Johnson, P. (2020). "Tim Stevens, Andryan Lagarde, Ronnie Richardson, Marquesha Jackson, Kahrim Bell [Photographs]". Turning Tables NOLA.
- Johnson, P. (June 18, 2020). "Toni Tipton-Martin [Photograph]". The New York Times.
- Johnson, P. (September 28, 2020). "Randall Kenan and Tom Rankin, 2019 [Photograph]". Duke Center for Documentary Studies.
- Johnson, P. (March 3, 2021). "Toni Tipton-Martin [Photograph]". Cooks Without Borders.
- Johnson, P. (April 9, 2021). "Nathaniel Rich [Photograph]". The New York Times.
- Johnson, P. (November 3, 2021). "Toni Tipton-Martin [Photograph]". The New York Times.
- Johnson, P. (September 6, 2022). "Ms. Cinnamon Black [Photograph]". Oxford American. No. 118. p. 42.
- Johnson, P. (2023). "MS Southern Foodways Alliance Associate Professor Catarina Passidomo [Photograph]". University Wire.
- Johnson, P. (2024). "Marwan Pleasant, New Orleans, Louisiana [Photographs]". Southern Cultures.

=== AV Media ===
- Yearling, M. (director), Johnson, P. (producer, contributor) (2016). It's Your Glory: The Mardi Gras Indian Queens (Television production). PBS.
- Yearling, M. (director), Johnson, P. (producer, contributor) (2016). Spirit Leads My Needle: The Big Chiefs of Carnival (Television production). PBS.
