= WDRL =

WDRL may refer to:

- WDRL-LD, a defunct low-power television station (channel 26) formerly licensed to serve Wilmington, North Carolina, United States
- WZBJ, a television station (channel 24) licensed to serve Danville, Virginia, United States, which held the call sign WDRL-TV from 1997 to 2011
- WMOI, a radio station (97.7 FM) licensed to serve Monmouth, Illinois, United States, which held the call sign WDRL-FM until 1981
