= WLSR =

Radio station in Galesburg, Illinois

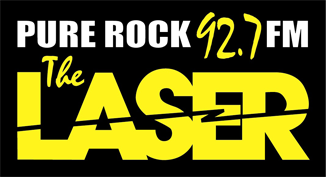
- Galesburg, Illinois; United States
- Frequency: 92.7 MHz
- Branding: 92.7 FM The Laser

Programming
- Format: Modern rock

Ownership
- Owner: Galesburg Broadcasting Company (sale to Civic Media pending)
- Sister stations: WAAG; WGIL; WKAY; WZIE

History
- First air date: January 17, 1979
- Former call signs: WGBQ (1979–1997)
- Call sign meaning: LaSeR

Technical information
- Licensing authority: FCC
- Facility ID: 49514
- Class: A
- ERP: 4,200 watts
- HAAT: 119 meters (390 ft)
- Transmitter coordinates: 40°56′34″N 90°20′39″W

Links
- Public license information: Public file; LMS
- Website: www.thelaseronline.com

WLSR (92.7 FM, "The Laser") is a commercial radio station in Galesburg, Illinois, United States.

WLSR broadcasts a modern rock music format and carries the "Free Beer and Hot Wings" morning show.

== History ==
The station signed on in 1979 with the call letters "WGBQ" and a top-40 format known as "Q93." It was a sister station to WAIK (1590 AM). Throughout the 1980s the format was very popular throughout Galesburg and Knox County, but into the 90s the station struggled.

In 1997, the station was sold to Galesburg Broadcasting Company and changed format to rock known as "The Laser."

In October 2026, it was announced that the station along with its sister stations would be sold to Civic Media.
