= Galesburg Historic District =

Historic district in Illinois, United States

- U.S. National Register of Historic Places
- U.S. Historic district
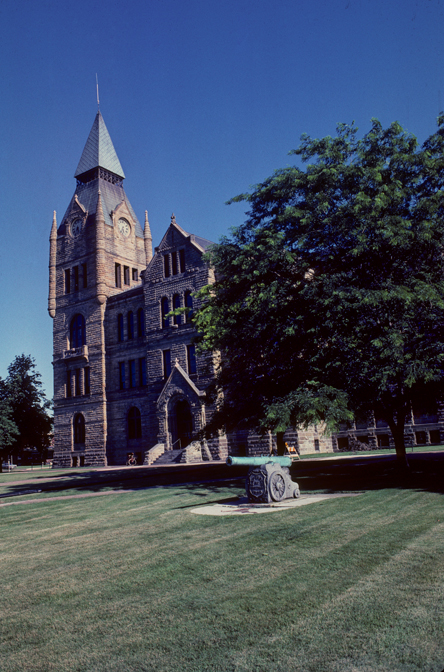
- Knox County Courthouse

- Location within Illinois Location within the United States
- Location: Roughly bounded by Berrien, Clark, Pearl, and Sanborn Sts., Galesburg, Illinois
- Coordinates: 40°57′7″N 90°22′9″W
- Area: 496 acres (201 ha)
- NRHP reference No.: 76000715
- Added to NRHP: November 21, 1976

The Galesburg Historic District is a 496-acre (201 ha) historic district in Galesburg, Illinois. The district includes 1049 contributing buildings and contains the town's original plat as well as several older neighborhoods. The section of the district south of North Street encompasses Galesburg's historic city center and its most significant landmarks, such as the Knox County Courthouse, the Knox County Jail, the Burlington Depot (which has since been torn down), and Main Street's commercial buildings. Knox College, the school Galesburg was founded to serve, and its historic Old Main are also located in the southern half of the district. The area north of North Street is mainly residential and is dominated by Queen Anne and Classical Revival houses, including many transitional houses displaying elements of both styles.

The district was added to the National Register of Historic Places on November 21, 1976.
