= WKAY =

Radio station in Knoxville, Illinois

Coordinates: 40.943°N 90.344°W

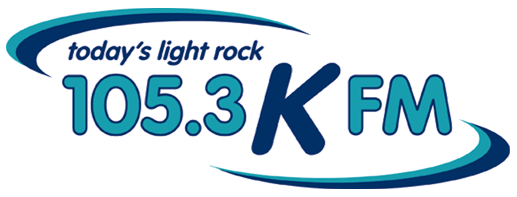
- Knoxville, Illinois; United States
- Broadcast area: Galesburg and surrounding areas
- Frequency: 105.3 MHz
- Branding: 105.3 KFM

Programming
- Format: Adult contemporary

Ownership
- Owner: Galesburg Broadcasting Company (sale to Civic Media pending)
- Sister stations: WAAG; WGIL; WLSR; WZIE

History
- First air date: December 13, 2000

Technical information
- Licensing authority: FCC
- Facility ID: 76984
- Class: A
- ERP: 3,700 watts
- HAAT: 129 meters (423 ft)

Links
- Public license information: Public file; LMS
- Website: www.1053kfm.com

WKAY (105.3 FM, "105.3 KFM') is a radio station broadcasting an adult contemporary format. Licensed to Knoxville, Illinois, the station serves the Galesburg area including Knoxville, Monmouth, Abingdon and surrounding communities. WKAY is owned by Galesburg Broadcasting Company. The station, known on the air as "Today's Refreshing Light Rock 105.3 KFM" or "105.3 KFM" for short, signed on the air on Wednesday, December 13, 2000. Before the "official" sign on, the station played Christmas music while testing the transmitter. "Officially", the first song played was the "Heart of Rock-n-Roll" by Huey Lewis & The News. Mornings host Chris McIntyre was the first jock to be heard on 105.3 KFM. The original on-air line-up consisted of Chris McIntyre (5:30 am – 10 am), Scott Michael (10 am – 3 pm), K.C. Fleming (3 pm – 7 pm). As of 2025, Chris McIntyre is still Program Director and host of "Mornings with McIntyre' and Tyler Gumm (12 pm – 6 pm). In addition to morning duties, Chris McIntyre is also the Program/Music Director.

The station's format is adult contemporary featuring artists such as John Mayer, Lady Gaga, Daughtry, Katy Perry, Pink, Rob Thomas, Taylor Swift, along with hits from the 1970s, 1980s, and 1990s. On weekends, the station features an all-1970s format on Saturdays titled "Saturday in the 70s". In addition to locally hosted shows, "Saturday in the 70s" also features syndicated shows like Casey Kasem's AT 40:The 70s, The 70s with Steve Goddard, and Back to the 70s with M.G. Kelly. On Sundays, the station features an all 1980s format titled "Absolutely 80s". It features locally hosted shows along with Casey Kasem's AT40: The 80s.

WKAY-FM is also known as the "Christmas Station". This is because the station drops the adult contemporary format for an all Christmas format beginning at 9 am the day before Thanksgiving through Christmas Day.
