= Galesburg Municipal Airport =

Airport in Illinois, United States of America

Coordinates: 40°56′17″N 090°25′52″W

Harrel W. Timmons Galesburg Regional Airport
- IATA: GBG; ICAO: KGBG; FAA LID: GBG

Summary
- Airport type: Public
- Owner: City of Galesburg
- Serves: Galesburg, Illinois
- Elevation AMSL: 764 ft (233 m)
- Website: www.ci.galesburg.il.us/government/departments/airport/index.php

Map
- Location of airport in Illinois GBG (the United States)

Runways
Direction	Length		Surface
Direction	ft	m	Surface
3/21	5,792	1,766	Asphalt
10/28	3,600	1,098	Asphalt

Statistics
- Aircraft operations (2017): 14,000
- Based aircraft (2019): 27
- Source: Federal Aviation Administration

Harrel W. Timmons Galesburg Regional Airport (IATA: GBG, ICAO: KGBG, FAA LID: GBG) is a city owned public use airport located three miles (5 km) west of the central business district of Galesburg, a city in Knox County, Illinois, United States.

== History ==
Ozark AirLines offered commercial service into Galesburg from 1960 until the mid-1970s. Flights operated from St. Louis and Chicago with two morning and two evening flights.

The airport had a control tower until the 1980s. The tower sat vacant until a plan to tear it down was announced in 2019. In addition to significant disrepair, officials cited the structure's tendency to attract wildlife and the nuisance of regularly changing safety lights for a building that wasn't needed.

In 2024, the airport was redesignated as a regional airport, allowing it to access additional funding each year and making applications for even more funding easier to succeed.

The airport was renamed in honor of Harrel W. Timmons, a pilot and aircraft mechanic who founded that airport's Fixed Base Operator, in 2025. Timmons oversaw significant growth at the airport, including its designation as a Regional Airport to secure additional funding and services.

== Facilities and aircraft ==
Harrel W. Timmons Galesburg Regional Airport covers an area of 623 acres (252 ha) and contains two asphalt-paved runways: runway 3/21 measures 5,792 by 150 ft (1,765 by 46 m), and runway 10/28 measures 3,600 by 100 ft (1,097 by 30 m).

A number of hangars and taxiways were rebuilt in 2019.

The airport has a fixed-base operator that offers fuel as well as cargo handling, catering, and GPUs as well as conference rooms, lounges, office space, snooze rooms, and courtesy cars.

For the 12-month period ending March 31, 2020, the airport had 14,000 aircraft operations, an average of 38 per day: 79% general aviation, 18% air taxi, and 3% military. For the same time period, there were 27 aircraft based at this airport: 22 single-engine and 3 multi-engine airplanes, 1 jet, and 1 helicopter.

== Stearman Fly-In ==
Annually, The Harrel W. Timmons Galesburg Regional Airport hosts the National Stearman Fly-In. The fly-in includes numerous World War II-era Boeing Stearman aircraft from around the world. Galesburg has been the host airport of the fly-in since 1972 and regularly sees more than 100 aircraft for the fly-in and related airshow. In 2022, there was a newly-built Stearman Community Center at the airport to help host the event. The event includes forums, aerobatics, and rides in Stearman aircraft as well as STOL competitions and flour-bombing.

The event focuses on the Model 75 Stearman and brings pilots from as far away as Los Angeles and New York.

== See also ==
- List of airports in Illinois
- Galesburg station
