= National Stearman Fly-In =

Annual air show in Galesburg, Illinois

- Genre: Air show
- Dates: September
- Frequency: Annually
- Venue: Harrel W. Timmons Galesburg Regional Airport
- Location: Galesburg, Illinois
- Coordinates: 40.938056°N 90.431111°W
- Country: United States
- Established: 1972; 54 years ago
- Founders: Jim Leahy; Tom Lowe
- Organizer: National Stearman Foundation
- Website: www.stearmanflyin.com

The National Stearman Fly-In is an annual gathering of Stearman Kaydet airplanes at the Harrel W. Timmons Galesburg Regional Airport in Galesburg, Illinois.

== History ==
The fly-in was established in 1972, when Tom Lowe and Jim Leahy sent out 2,000 letters in an attempt to invite as many Stearmans as possible for a gathering at the airport. In the end, only 24 attended. However, a decade later the number present had grown to approximately 70.

Jim Leahy died in June 1995.

The National Stearman Foundation was established in 1998 to support the fly-in and build a permanent museum.

The 2009 fly-in featured the opportunity for visitors to pilot a Stearman themselves for the first time.

The goal of the National Stearman Foundation was achieved on the 50th anniversary of the event in 2021, when a structurally complete, but internally unfinished 10,000-square-foot (930 m^{2}) hangar called the International Stearman Community Center was due to be dedicated. The same year had a record 152 Stearmans participate.

It was announced that during the 2025 event, the airport was to be named for Harrel W. Timmons, the founder of the fixed-base operator at the airport and a member of the National Stearman Foundation board of directors.

== Events ==
Events include owners seminars, an awards show, a STOL competition and a flour bombing contest. Rides are also offered to the public.

== See also ==
- List of air shows
