= WGIL =

Radio station in Galesburg, Illinois

Coordinates: 40°56′47″N 90°22′08″W

- Galesburg, Illinois; United States
- Frequency: 1400 kHz
- Branding: WGIL 93.7FM & 1400AM

Programming
- Format: News/talk/sports

Ownership
- Owner: Galesburg Broadcasting Company (sale to Civic Media pending)
- Sister stations: WAAG; WKAY; WLSR; WZIE

History
- First air date: June 12, 1938
- Former frequencies: 1500 kHz (1938–1941)
- Call sign meaning: Where Galesburg Is Listening

Technical information
- Licensing authority: FCC
- Facility ID: 23039
- Class: C
- Power: 740 watts
- Translator: 93.7 W229BO (Galesburg)

Links
- Public license information: Public file; LMS
- Website: wgil.com

WGIL (1400 AM) is a radio station in Galesburg, Illinois, United States. Owned by Galesburg Broadcasting Company, the station broadcasts a news/talk/sports format.

WGIL carries a variety of local programming, as well as nationally syndicated shows such as Clark Howard and Jim Bohannon.

== History ==
WGIL began broadcasting on June 12, 1938, with its inaugural ceremony at the Galesburg Armory. Among the ceremony's attendees was Edith Luckett Davis, actress and mother of future first lady, Nancy Reagan. Congratulatory telegrams were sent by Bing Crosby, Eddy Duchin, Benny Goodman, Guy Lombardo, and Illinois Governor Henry Horner.

The station originally broadcast at 1500 kHz, running 250 watts during daytime hours only. Nighttime operations were added in 1939. In 1941, the station's frequency was changed to 1400 kHz. Daytime power was increased to 1,000 watts in 1961. Nighttime power was increased to 1,000 watts in 1985. In 1997, the station's power was reduced to 740 watts.

In the 1970s, 1980s, and 1990s, the station aired a MOR format. By 1987, the station had begun airing talk programming. By 1999, the station had adopted a news-talk-sports format.

== Translator ==
In 2015, WGIL began to be rebroadcast on 93.7 FM, through a translator in Galesburg.

Call sign	Frequency	City of license	FID	ERP (W)	HAAT	Class	FCC info
W229BO	93.7 FM	Galesburg, Illinois	143029	210	96 m (315 ft)	D	LMS
