= WAAG =

Radio station in Galesburg, Illinois

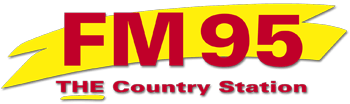
- Galesburg, Illinois; United States
- Frequency: 94.9 MHz
- Branding: FM 95

Programming
- Format: Country

Ownership
- Owner: Galesburg Broadcasting Company (sale to Civic Media pending)
- Sister stations: WGIL; WKAY; WLSR; WZIE

History
- First air date: December 15, 1966
- Former call signs: WGIL-FM (1966–197?)

Technical information
- Licensing authority: FCC
- Facility ID: 23038
- Class: B
- ERP: 50,000 watts
- HAAT: 150.0 meters (492.1 ft)
- Transmitter coordinates: 40°56′34″N 90°20′39″W

Links
- Public license information: Public file; LMS
- Website: www.fm95online.com

WAAG (94.9 MHz), known as FM 95, is a commercial radio station in Galesburg, Illinois, United States. The station is owned by Galesburg Broadcasting Company.

The station has a country music format, plus presents news and market information throughout the day. One feature of the station's format is a classic country program, presented at noon weekdays and for three hours on Sunday mornings; during these blocks, music from the 1940s through early 1990s are played.
