= Carl Sandburg State Historic Site =

Coordinates: 40°56′10.7″N 90°21′57.6″W

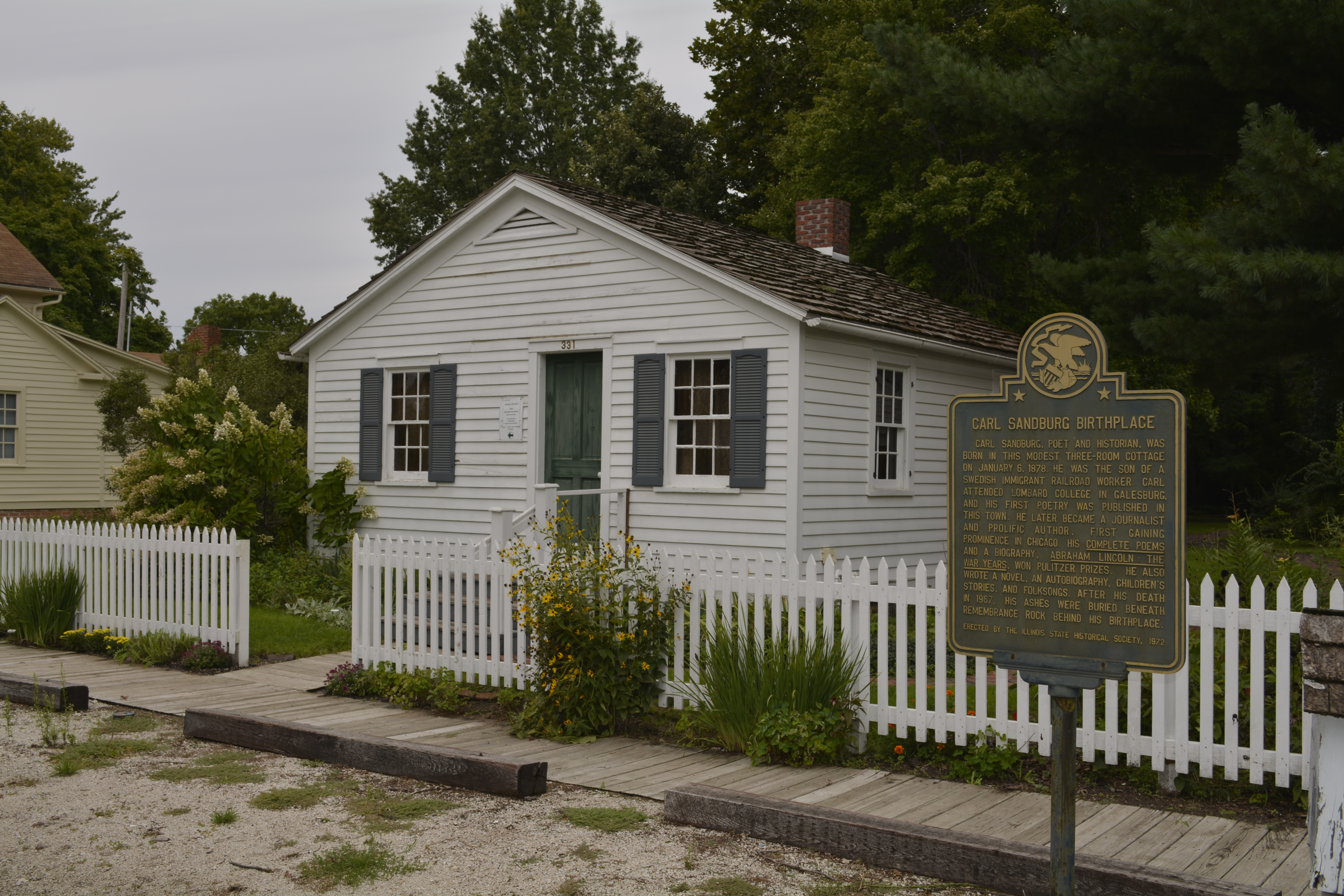
Carl Sandburg State Historic Site

Carl Sandburg State Historic Site was the birthplace and boyhood home of author Carl Sandburg in Galesburg, Illinois, United States. It is operated by the Illinois Historic Preservation Division. The site contains the cottage Sandburg was born in, a visitor center with a museum about Carl Sandburg, a museum shop, a small theater, and the rock under which he and his wife Lilian are buried.

The facility was closed to visitors in 2008 as a result of state budget cuts, but it reopened in April 2009, following Illinois Governor Pat Quinn's merger of the Illinois Historic Preservation Agency with the Illinois Department of Natural Resources.

Carl Sandburg College is also in Galesburg, Illinois.

Sandburg's home of 22 years in Flat Rock, Henderson County, North Carolina is preserved by the National Park Service as the Carl Sandburg Home National Historic Site.
