= WRAM =

Coordinates: 40°56′59″N 90°34′19″W

- Monmouth, Illinois; United States
- Broadcast area: Galesburg / Monmouth and Vicinity
- Frequency: 1330 kHz
- Branding: WRAM 1330AM 95.7FM

Programming
- Format: Classic Country

Ownership
- Owner: Robbins-Treat Resources, LLC
- Sister stations: WMOI

History
- First air date: May 1957

Technical information
- Licensing authority: FCC
- Class: D
- Power: 1,000 watts day 50 watts night
- Translator: 95.7 W239DB (Monmouth)

Links
- Public license information: Public file; LMS
- Webcast: Listen live
- Website: www.1330wram.com

WRAM (1330 AM) is a radio station broadcasting a classic country format. Licensed to Monmouth, Illinois, the station serves Monmouth and the Galesburg area. WRAM is owned by Robbins-Treat Resources, LLC.

== History ==
WRAM began broadcasting on May 5, 1957, and ran 1,000 watts during daytime hours only. It was owned by Prairieland Broadcasters. In 1971, the station was sold to Monmouth Broadcasting for $170,000. In 1977, it was sold to Coleman Broadcasting for $246,000. In 1986, the station was sold to KCD Enterprises for $325,000. In 1997, WRAM was sold to WPW Broadcasting, along with 97.7 WMOI, for $1.7 million.

Logo while on the 94.1 frequency

On October 3, 2018, WPW Broadcasting announced a sale of their Monmouth stations WMOI, WRAM, and WRAM's translator at 94.1, to Monmouth-based Robbins-Treat Resources, LLC for $168,000. The sale was consummated on December 28, 2018

== Translator ==
The station is also heard at 95.7 MHz, through a translator in Monmouth, Illinois.

Call sign	Frequency	City of license	FID	ERP (W)	HAAT	Class	FCC info
W239DB	95.7 FM	Monmouth, Illinois	143971	250	0 m (0 ft)	D	LMS
