= WOUB (AM) =

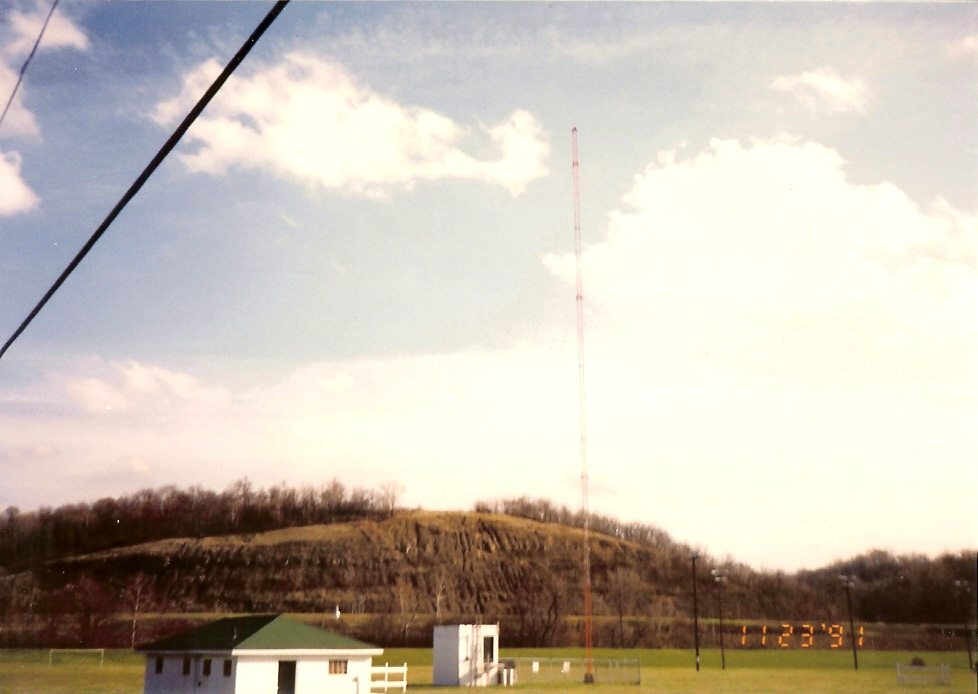
- WOUB transmitter tower located on Ohio University's South Green.
- Athens, Ohio; United States
- Broadcast area: Southeast Ohio
- Frequency: 1340 kHz

Programming
- Format: Public radio; community radio
- Affiliations: National Public Radio

Ownership
- Owner: Ohio University; (Ohio University)
- Sister stations: WOUB-FM, WOUB-TV

History
- First air date: September 14, 1957
- Call sign meaning: Ohio University Broadcasting

Technical information
- Licensing authority: FCC
- Facility ID: 50145
- Class: C
- Power: 500 watts daytime; 1,000 watts nighttime
- Transmitter coordinates: 39°19′45.26″N 82°5′28.52″W

Links
- Public license information: Public file; LMS
- Webcast: Listen live
- Website: woub.org

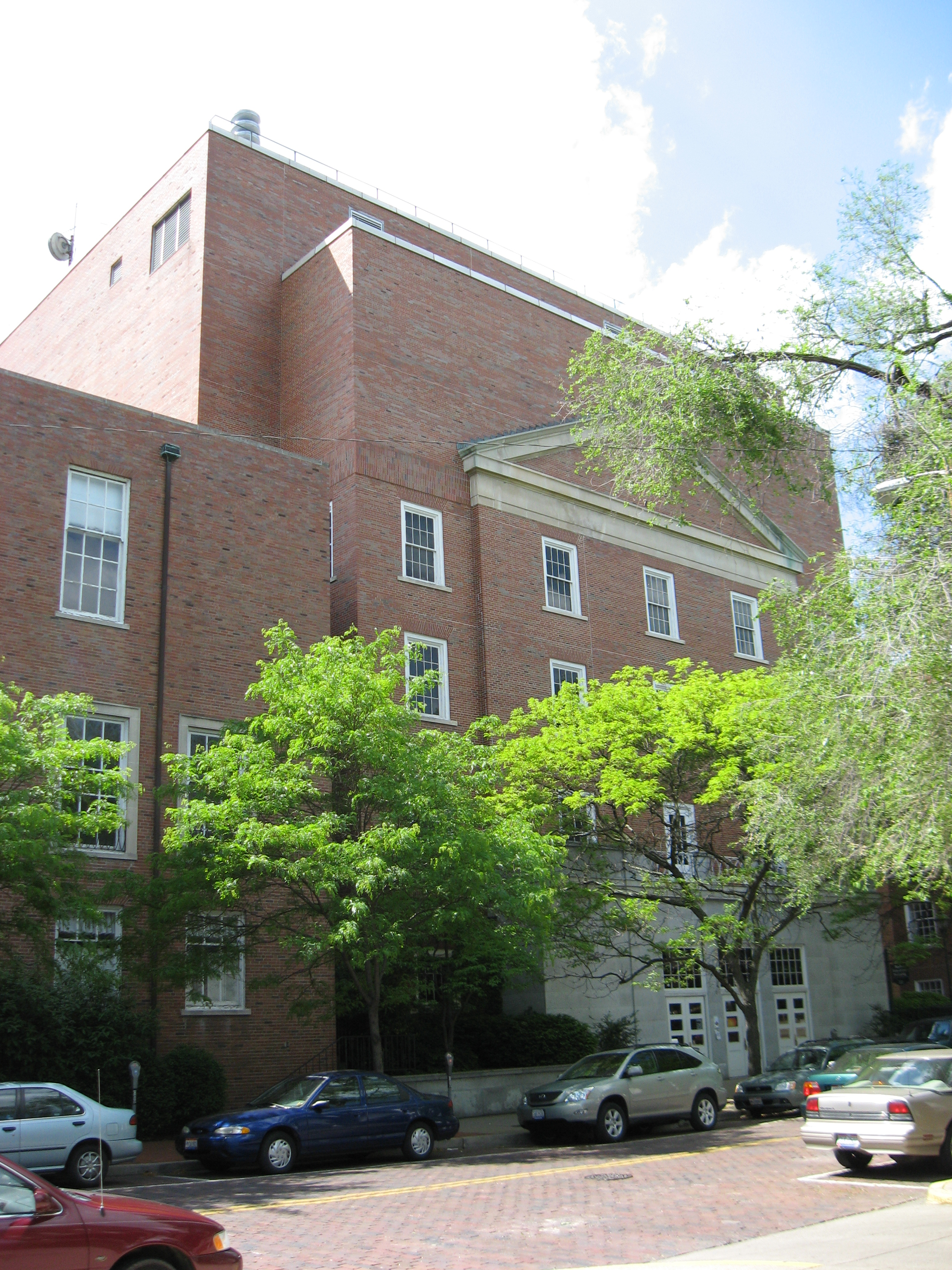
The Radio/Television Building at Ohio University, where WOUB is broadcast

WOUB (1340 AM) is a public radio station in Athens, Ohio. Unlike its FM counterpart, WOUB-FM, WOUB AM is generally more of a community radio station, with mainly programming for residents of Athens County, plus alternative music programming, and news from the BBC, among other programs.

Owned and operated by Ohio University, WOUB is on the air daily from 6 a.m. to midnight.
