= WMOI =

Coordinates: 40.890°N 90.609°W

- Monmouth, Illinois; United States
- Broadcast area: Galesburg / Monmouth and Vicinity
- Frequency: 97.7 MHz
- Branding: Sunny 97.7

Programming
- Format: Adult contemporary
- Affiliations: Westwood One

Ownership
- Owner: Robbins-Treat Resources, LLC
- Sister stations: WRAM

History
- First air date: December 2, 1967 (as WVPC-FM)
- Former call signs: WVPC-FM (1967–1977); WDRL (1977–1979); WDRL-FM (1979–1981)

Technical information
- Licensing authority: FCC
- Facility ID: 33711
- Class: A
- ERP: 3,400 watts
- HAAT: 134 meters (440 ft)

Links
- Public license information: Public file; LMS
- Webcast: Listen live
- Website: 977wmoi.com

WMOI (97.7 FM) is a radio station broadcasting an adult contemporary format. Licensed to Monmouth, Illinois, the station serves the Monmouth/Galesburg area. WMOI is owned by Robbins-Treat Resources, LLC.

== History ==
The station began broadcasting December 2, 1967 and held the call sign WVPC-FM. In the 1970s, WVPC-FM aired a MOR format, along with an increasing amount of country music programming. The station was an affiliate of the Mutual Broadcasting System. In 1977, the station's call sign was changed to WDRL, and in 1981 its call sign was changed to WMOI.

Previous logo

On October 3, 2018, WPW Broadcasting announced a sale of their Monmouth stations WMOI, WRAM, and WRAM's translator at 94.1, to Monmouth-based Robbins-Treat Resources, LLC for $168,000. The sale was consummated on December 28, 2018.
