= WOUB-FM =

Public radio station in Athens, Ohio

Coordinates: 39.315°N 82.150°W

- Athens, Ohio; United States
- Broadcast area: Southeast Ohio
- Frequency: 91.3 MHz
- Branding: WOUB NPR

Programming
- Format: Public radio
- Affiliations: National Public Radio; Public Radio Exchange; BBC World Service

Ownership
- Owner: Ohio University

History
- Founded: 1942
- First air date: December 13, 1949
- Former call signs: WOUI (1949–1959)
- Former frequencies: 88.5 MHz (1949–1953); 91.5 MHz (1953–1967)
- Call sign meaning: Ohio University Broadcasting

Technical information
- Licensing authority: FCC
- Facility ID: 50149
- Class: B
- ERP: 50,000 watts
- HAAT: 150 meters (490 ft)
- Repeater: see below

Links
- Public license information: Public file; LMS
- Webcast: Listen live
- Website: www.woub.org

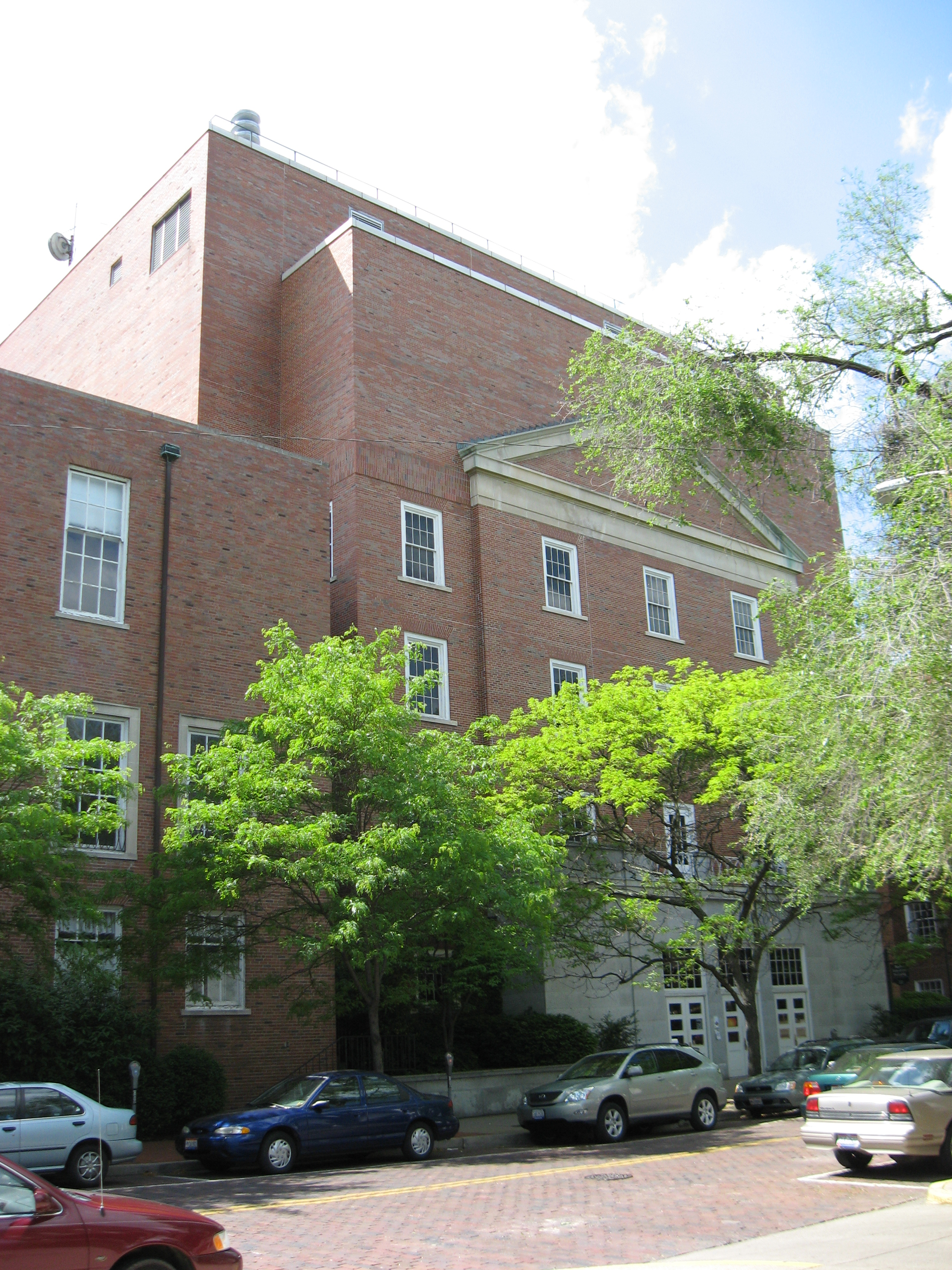
The Radio/Television Building at Ohio University, where WOUB is broadcast

WOUB-FM (91.3 FM) is a noncommercial educational radio station licensed to Athens, Ohio, United States. Owned by Ohio University, it is the flagship of a five-station network known as Ohio University Public Radio. The studios and offices are on South College Street in Athens.

The transmitter is on Bittersweet Lane, near Ohio State Route 56 in Athens, co-located with the tower for WOUB-TV (channel 20).

== Programming ==
By day, WOUB-FM airs mostly news and informational programs, many from NPR. Daytime shows include Morning Edition, All Things Considered, Here and Now, 1A and Fresh Air with Terry Gross.

At night, it broadcasts music shows, focusing on a mix of musical genres: adult album alternative, bluegrass, Americana and world music. Nighttime music shows include Crossing Boundaries, World Cafe, The Thistle & Shamrock, Afropop Worldwide and Mountain Stage.

== History ==
WOUB debuted in 1942 as WOUI, a carrier current station broadcasting from Ewing Hall on the Ohio University campus. It became a fully licensed FM station, signing on the air on December 13, 1949. On July 10, 1959, it changed its call sign to WOUB-FM.

In its early years, it aired educational programs and classical music. Many of the voices were students or staff at the university. In 1963, WOUB-TV channel 20 made its debut. WOUB-FM later became a member of National Public Radio and added its news and music shows to its line up.

== Rebroadcasters ==
The station serves most of southern and southeastern Ohio, plus portions of neighboring West Virginia and Kentucky, through a network of repeater stations:

Broadcast translators for WOUB-FM
| Call sign | Frequency | City of license | FID | FCC info |
|---|---|---|---|---|
| WOUC-FM | 89.1 FM | Cambridge, Ohio | 50142 | LMS |
| WOUH-FM | 91.9 FM | Chillicothe, Ohio | 50143 | LMS |
| WOUL-FM | 89.1 FM | Ironton, Ohio | 50146 | LMS |
| WOUZ-FM | 90.1 FM | Zanesville, Ohio | 50140 | LMS |

Ohio University Public Radio also operates WOUB (1340 AM), which offers a public radio schedule different from FM.

== Images ==
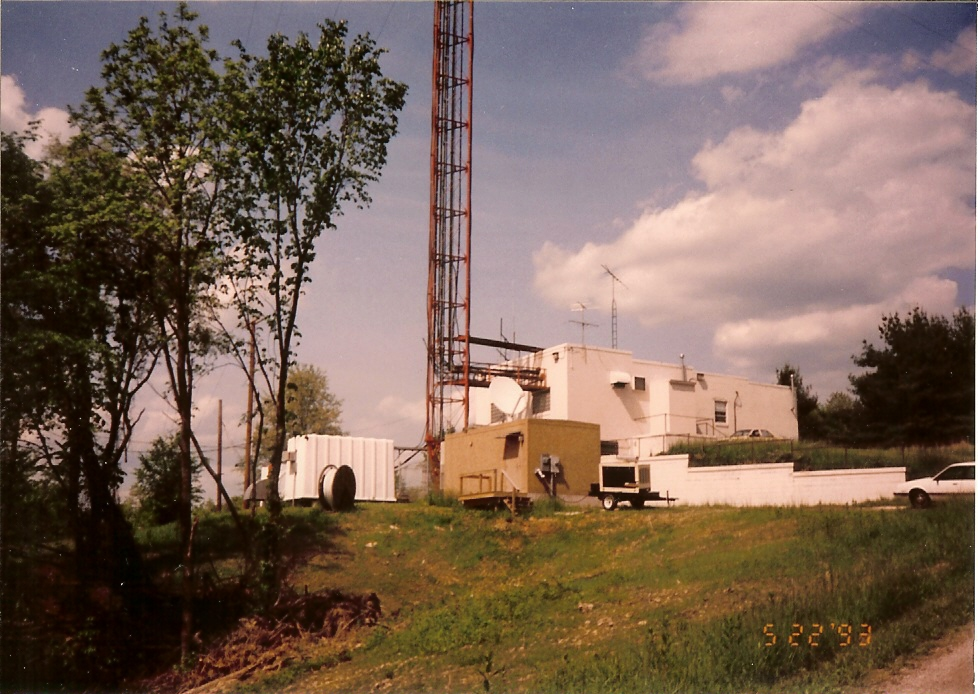
Transmitter facility for WOUB-FM-TV, Athens, Ohio. Photo taken in 1993.

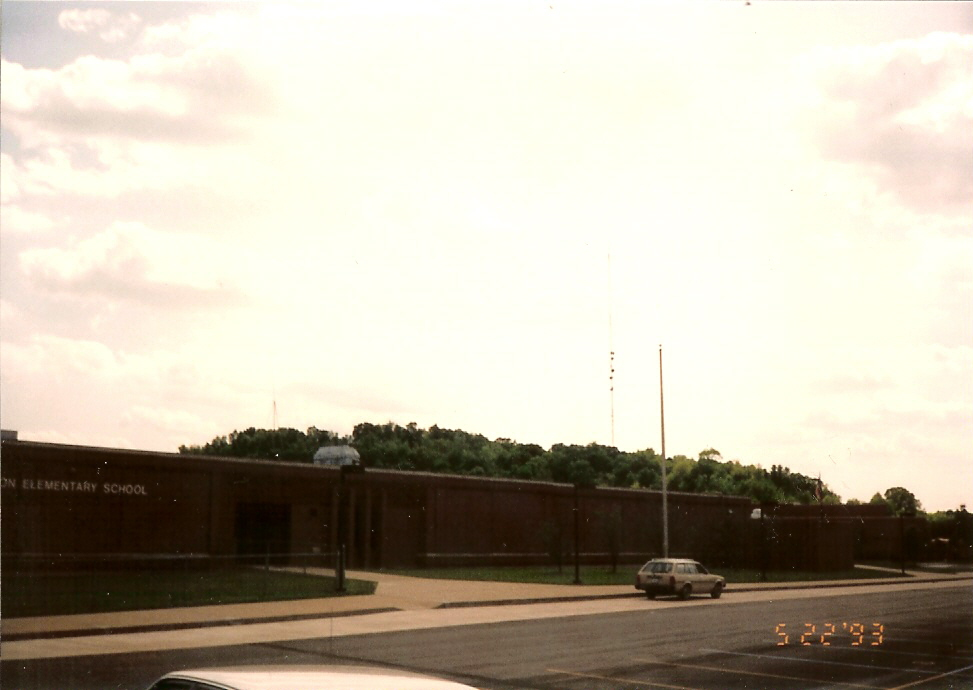
Transmitter tower for WOUB-FM-TV, Athens, Ohio. Photo taken in 1993.
