= WOUB-TV =

Television station in Athens, Ohio

WOUB-TV and WOUC-TV
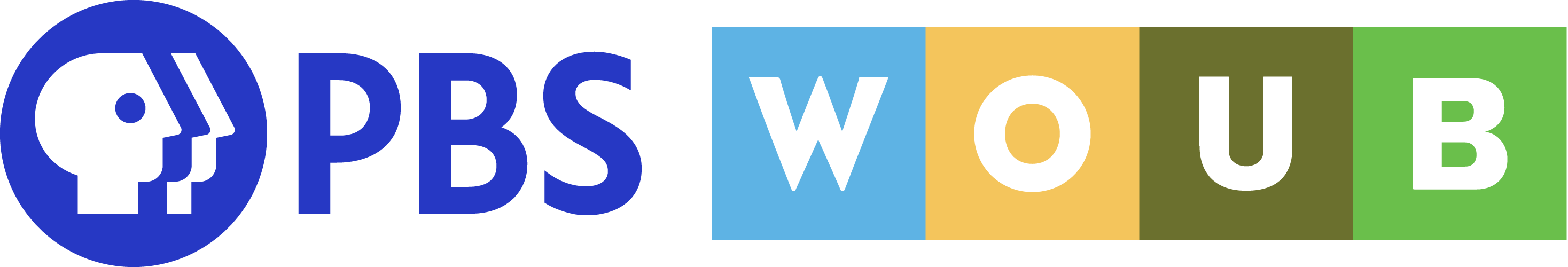

WOUB-TV: Athens–Marietta, Ohio Parkersburg, West Virginia; WOUC-TV: Cambridge–Zanesville, Ohio; United States
- Channels for WOUB-TV: Digital: 32 (UHF); Virtual: 20
- Channels for WOUC-TV: Digital: 6 (VHF); Virtual: 44
- Branding: PBS WOUB

Programming
- Affiliations: 20.1/44.1: PBS; for others, see § Subchannels

Ownership
- Owner: Ohio University; (WOUB Public Media)
- Sister stations: WOUB; WOUB-FM

History
- First air date: WOUB-TV: January 7, 1963; WOUC-TV: July 26, 1973
- Former channel number: WOUB-TV: Analog: 20 (UHF, 1963–2009); Digital: 27 (UHF, mid 2000s–2019); WOUC-TV: Analog: 44 (UHF, 1973–2009); Digital: 35 (UHF, mid 2000s–2019)
- Former affiliations: NET (1963–1970)
- Call sign meaning: WOUB-TV: "Ohio University Broadcasting"; WOUC-TV: "Ohio University, Cambridge"

Technical information
- Licensing authority: FCC
- Facility ID: WOUB-TV: 50147; WOUC-TV: 50141
- ERP: WOUB-TV: 250 kW; WOUC-TV: 7.11 kW
- HAAT: WOUB-TV: 245.5 m (805 ft); WOUC-TV: 337.8 m (1,108 ft)
- Transmitter coordinates: WOUB-TV: 39°18′52″N 82°8′59″W; WOUC-TV: 40°5′32″N 81°17′18″W

Links
- Public license information: WOUB-TV: Public file; LMS; WOUC-TV: Public file; LMS
- Website: woub.org

WOUB-TV (channel 20) is a PBS member television station in Athens, Ohio, United States. The station's transmitter is located west of the city off SR 56. Its programming can also be seen on satellite station WOUC-TV (channel 44) in Cambridge, with transmitter near Fairview, Ohio.

The WOUB/WOUC studios and offices are located in the Radio-TV building on the campus of Ohio University on College Street in Athens, which owns the stations' licenses through the WOUB Center for Public Media. The center is a non-academic unit of the Scripps College of Communication. The two stations, combined, serve southeastern Ohio and portions of neighboring West Virginia and Kentucky. The public media center also serves as a laboratory for Ohio University students who are interested in gaining experience in broadcasting and related technologies. In addition to radio (WOUB AM and FM) and television, WOUB is also active in online services and media production.

Unlike most PBS stations, the channel produces a regular local newscast by university students studying and training on television newscasts at Ohio University. With that, they mainly focus on the area around Athens, which is mostly ignored by the Columbus, Zanesville and Huntington–Charleston stations that serve the Athens area.

== Coverage area ==
Athens and surrounding Athens County are located in the fringes of the Columbus market, which is primarily served by WOSU-TV. However, the combined power of the two stations reaches most of the Huntington–Charleston and Zanesville markets, as well as portions of the Columbus, Parkersburg and Wheeling–Steubenville markets. The station leases commercial fiber line to permit it to be carried on the Columbus local feeds of the DBS providers under must-carry provisions.

WOUC-TV serves as the PBS station of record for the Zanesville, Parkersburg, and Wheeling–Steubenville markets; in the latter case, that market is no longer able to receive WQED in Pittsburgh due to WQED selling off its spectrum in exchange for a low VHF frequency assignment in the spectrum incentive auction that makes reception hard to get even within the city limits of Pittsburgh, much less distant areas. WOUB-TV is the secondary PBS station in Columbus to WOSU-TV, while it shares the primary status in the Huntington–Charleston market alongside West Virginia Public Broadcasting and Kentucky Educational Television.

== Technical information ==
As of April 11, 2018, when they expanded to six broadcast streams per transmitter, WOUB-TV and WOUC-TV share the same programming.

=== Subchannels ===
The stations' signals are multiplexed:

Subchannels of WOUB-TV and WOUC-TV
| Channel | | Res. | Short name | Programming |
| WOUB-TV | WOUC-TV | Res. | Short name | Programming |
|---|---|---|---|---|
| 20.1 | 44.1 | 1080i | WOUB-HD | PBS |
| 20.2 | 44.2 | 480i | Classic | WOUB Classic |
| 20.3 | 44.3 | 480i | Weather | Weather |
| 20.4 | 44.4 | 480i | Create | Create |
| 20.5 | 44.5 | 480i | Ohio | The Ohio Channel |
| 20.6 | 44.6 | 1080i | Kids | PBS Kids |
| 20.7 | 44.7 | 480i | VoiceCo | VideoCorps |

=== Analog-to-digital conversion ===
In 2009, when the analog to digital conversion was completed, WOUB-TV and WOUC-TV used channels 27 and 35, respectively for digital television operations. Following the transition, the stations remained on those channels; however, they use 20 and 44 as their respective virtual channels. In 2019, both stations moved to new physical channels as part of the FCC's spectrum repack process.

== Images ==
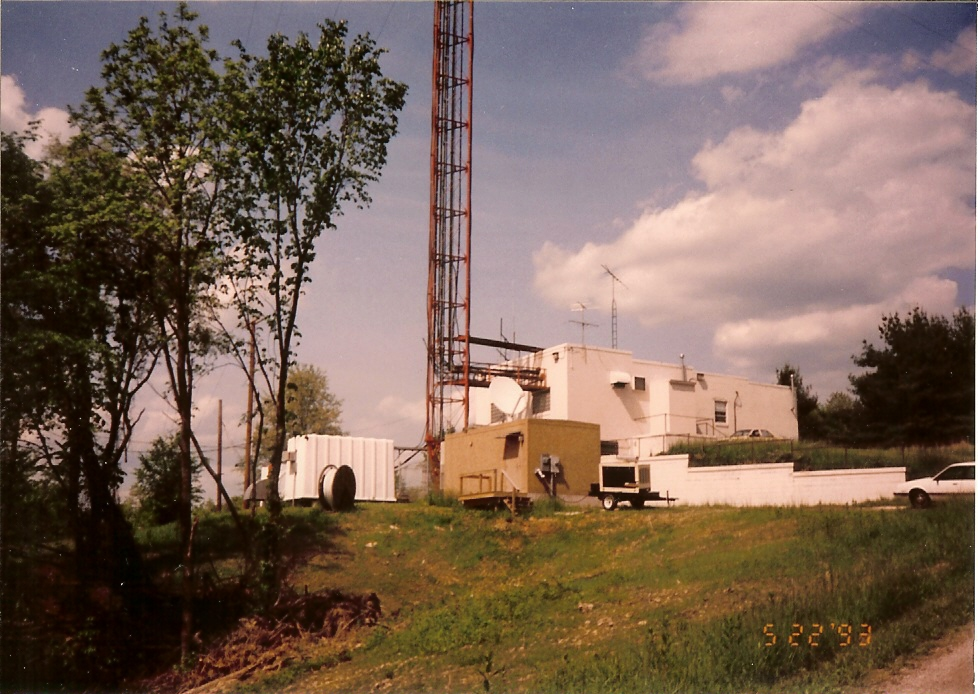
Transmitter facility for WOUB-FM/TV, Athens, Ohio. Photo taken in 1993.

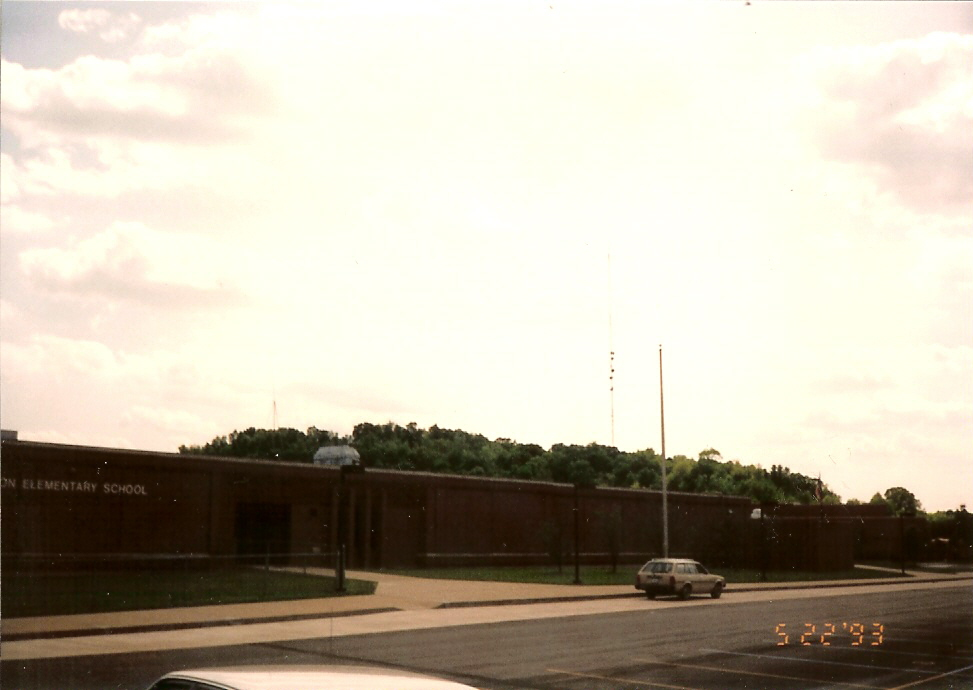
Transmitter tower for WOUB-FM/TV, Athens, Ohio. Photo taken in 1993.
