= Galesburg, Illinois =

- City
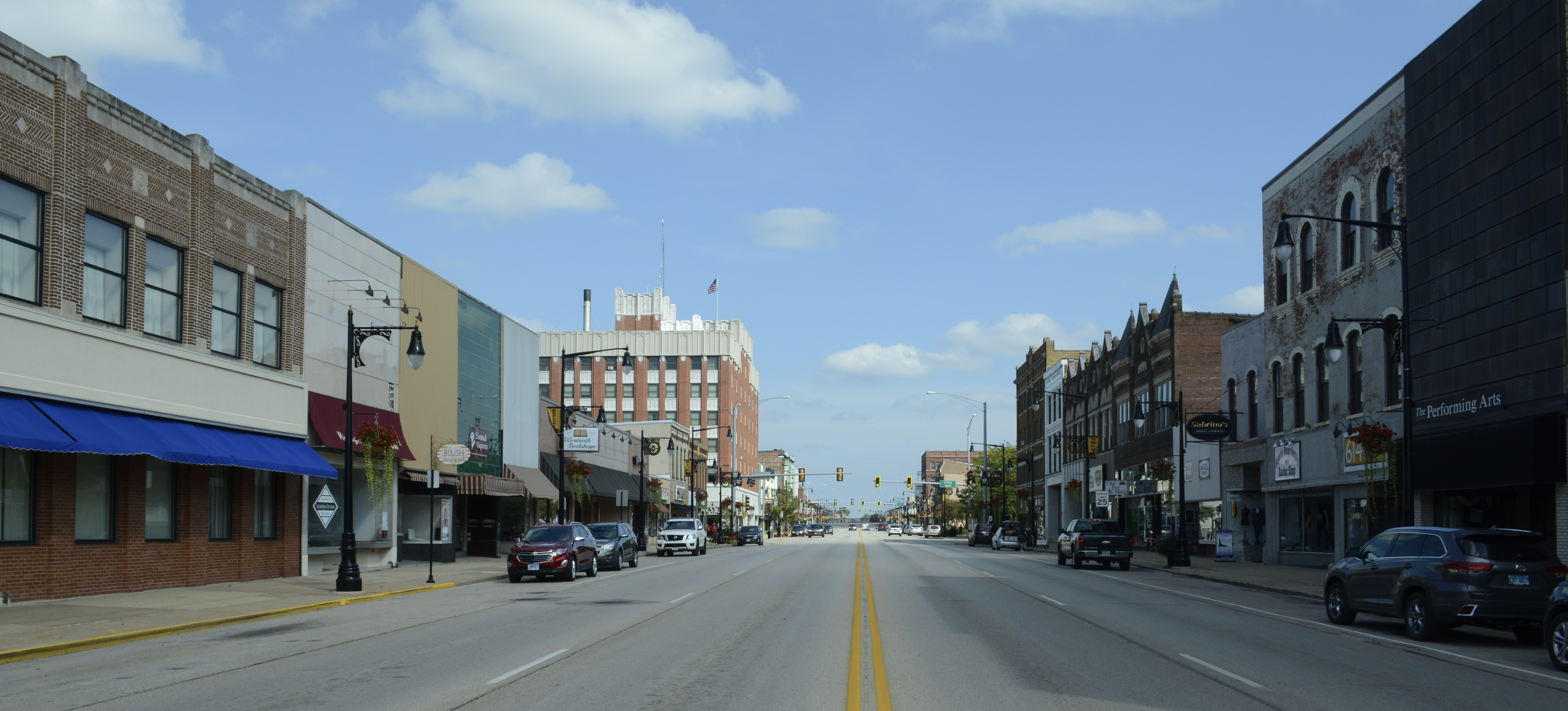
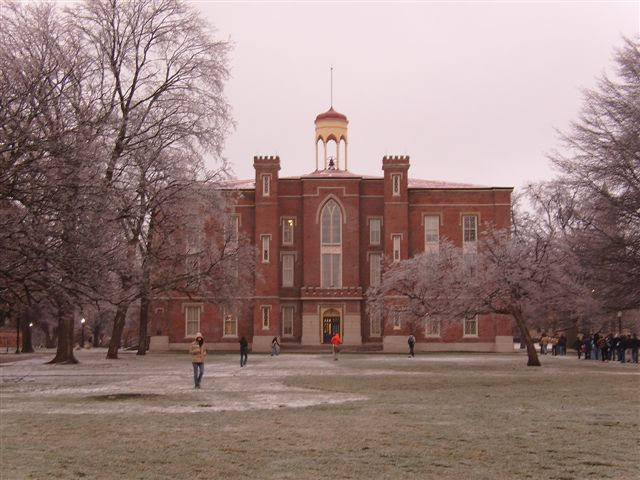
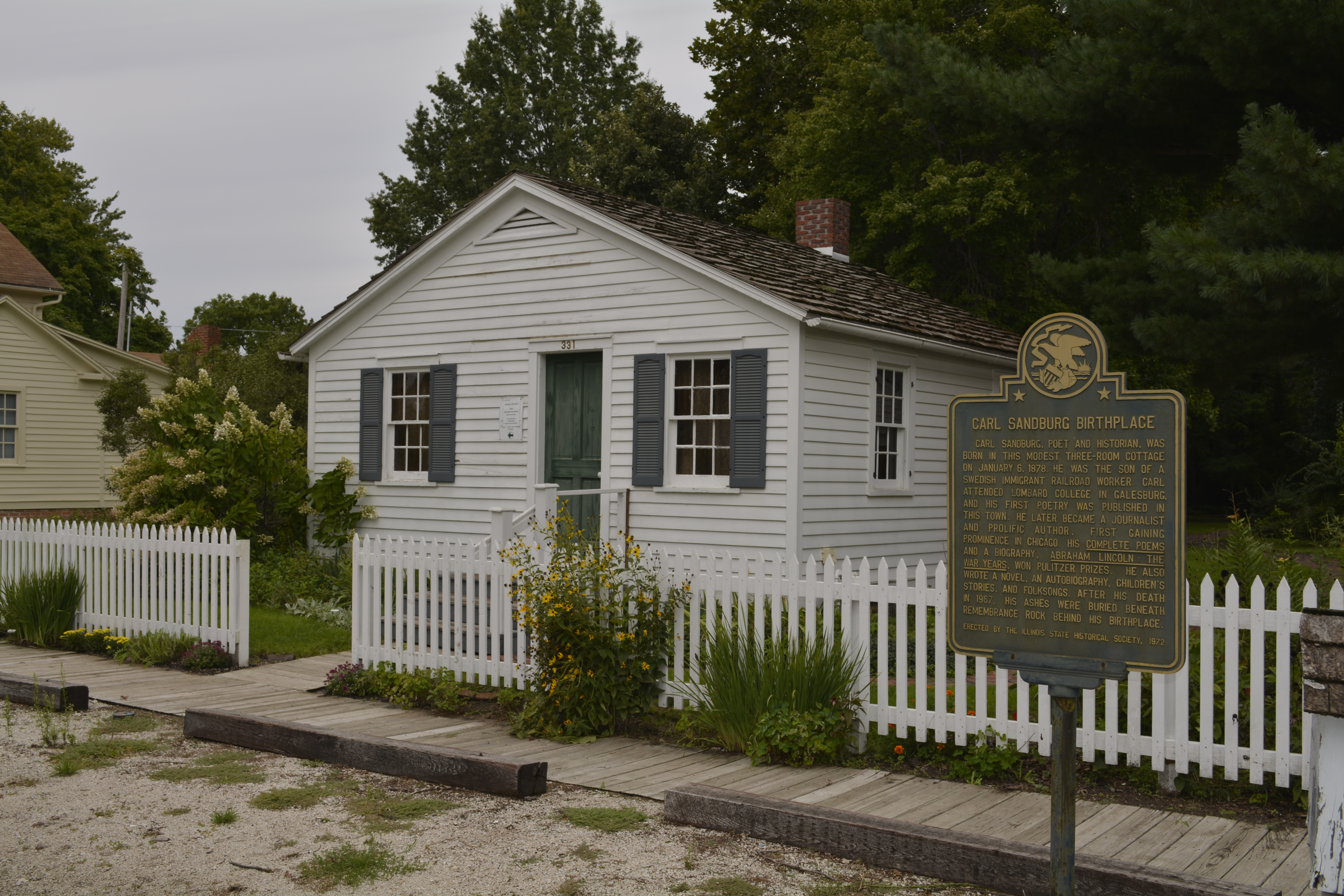
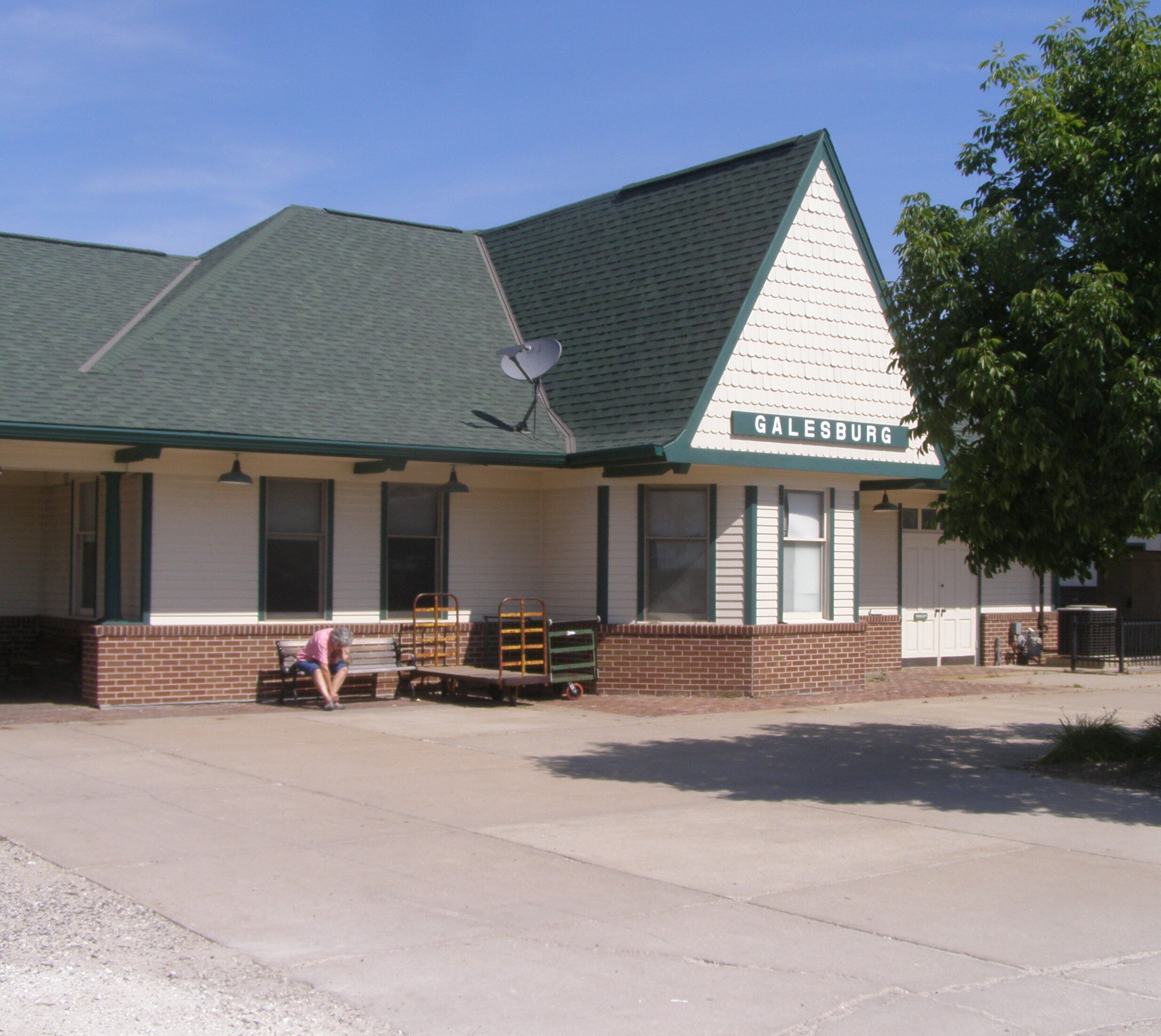
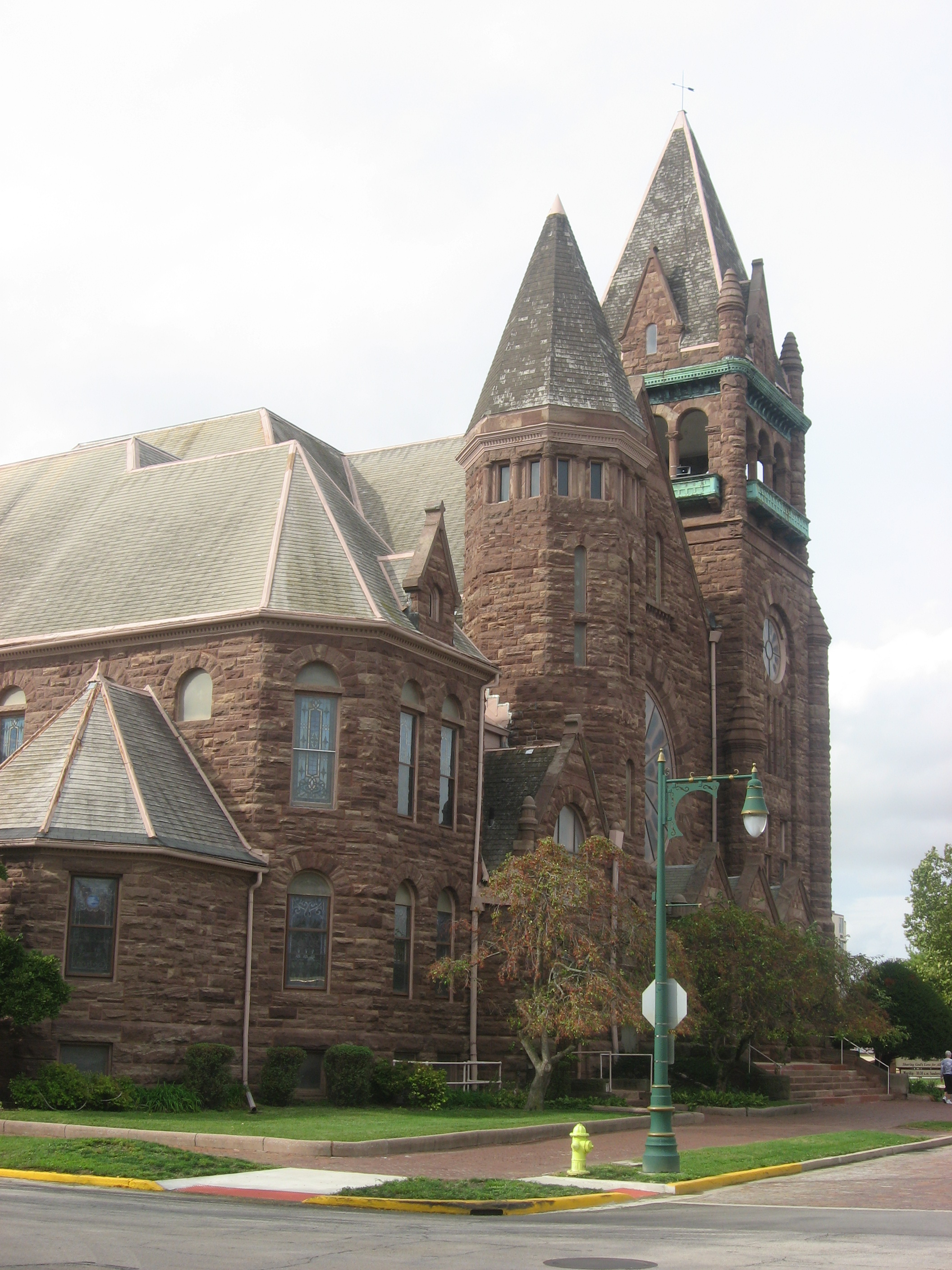
- Main Street, Galesburg Historic District Knox College Carl Sandburg State Historic Site Galesburg Amtrak Station Central Congregational Church

- Seal Logo
- Interactive map of Galesburg, Illinois
- Location within Illinois Location within the United States
- Coordinates: 40°57′08″N 90°21′10″W
- Country: United States
- State: Illinois
- County: Knox
- Township: Galesburg City
- Founded: 1837
- Founder: George Washington Gale

Government
  - Type: Council-Manager
  - Mayor: Peter Schwartzman (G)

Area
  - Total: 17.93 sq mi (46.45 km^{2})
  - Land: 17.76 sq mi (45.99 km^{2})
  - Water: 0.18 sq mi (0.46 km^{2})
- Elevation: 771 ft (235 m)

Population (2020)
  - Total: 30,052
  - Density: 1,692.2/sq mi (653.38/km^{2})
- Time zone: UTC−6 (CST)
  - Summer (DST): UTC−5 (CDT)
- ZIP code: 61401
- Area code: 309
- FIPS code: 17-28326
- GNIS feature ID: 2394842
- Wikimedia Commons: Galesburg, Illinois
- Website: www.ci.galesburg.il.us

Galesburg is a city in Knox County, Illinois, United States. The city is 45 miles (72 km) northwest of Peoria. At the 2020 census, its population was 30,052. Galesburg is the home of Knox College, a private four-year liberal arts college, and Carl Sandburg College, a community college named for native-born poet Carl Sandburg.

Galesburg is the county seat of Knox County and the principal city of the Galesburg Micropolitan Statistical Area, which includes all of Knox and Warren counties. A 496-acre (201 ha) section of the city is listed on the National Register of Historic Places as the Galesburg Historic District.

== History ==
Galesburg was founded by George Washington Gale, a Presbyterian minister from New York state who had formulated the concept of the manual labor college and first implemented it at the Oneida Institute near Utica, New York. In 1836 Gale publicized a subscription- and land purchase-based plan to found manual labor colleges in the Mississippi River valley. Land was purchased for this purpose in Knox County and in 1837 the first subscribers to the college-founding plan arrived and began to settle what became Galesburg.

Populated from the start by abolitionists, Galesburg was home to one of Illinois's first anti-slavery societies and a stop on the Underground Railroad. On October 7, 1858, the city was the site of the fifth Lincoln–Douglas debate. Galesburg was also the home of Mary Ann "Mother" Bickerdyke, who provided hospital care for Union soldiers during the Civil War.

Galesburg is the birthplace of poet Carl Sandburg, artist Dorothea Tanning, and former Major League Baseball star Jim Sundberg. The Illinois Historic Preservation Agency maintains Sandburg's boyhood home as the Carl Sandburg State Historic Site. It includes the cottage where he was born, a modern museum, the rock under which he and his wife Lilian are buried, and a performance venue.

For much of its history, Galesburg was inextricably tied to the railroad industry. Local businessmen were major backers of the first railroad to connect Illinois's then two biggest cities—Chicago and Quincy—as well as a third leg initially terminating across the Mississippi River from Burlington, Iowa, and eventually connecting to it via bridge and thence onward to the Western frontier. The Chicago, Burlington and Quincy Railroad (CB&Q) sited major rail sorting yards here, including the first to use hump sorting. The CB&Q also built a major depot on South Seminary Street that was controversially torn down and replaced by a much smaller station in 1983. The BNSF Railway still uses the yard.

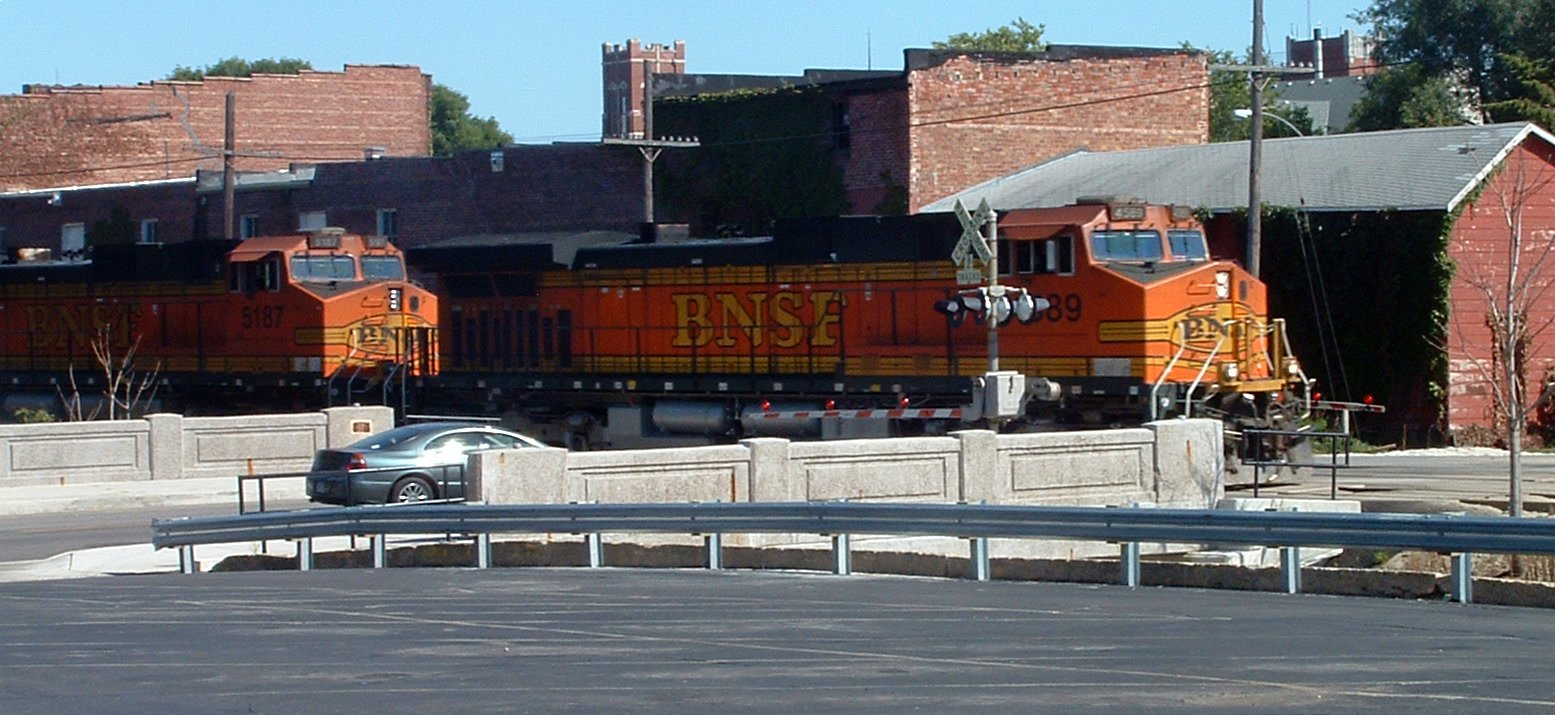
A BNSF train passes through central Galesburg near the site of the former Santa Fe depot.

In the late 19th century, when the Atchison, Topeka and Santa Fe Railway connected its service through to Chicago, it also laid track through Galesburg and built its own railroad depot. The depot remained in operation until the construction of the Cameron Connector southwest of town enabled Amtrak to reroute the Southwest Chief via the Mendota Subdivision and join the California Zephyr and Illinois Zephyr at the Burlington Northern depot. A series of mergers eventually united both lines under BNSF's ownership, carrying an average of seven freight trains per hour between them. Since the 2004 closure of the Maytag plant, BNSF is once again Galesburg's largest private employer.

Galesburg was home to the pioneering brass era automobile company Western, which produced the Gale, named for the town.

Galesburg was home to minor league baseball from 1890 to 1914. The Galesburg Pavers was the last name of the minor league team based there. Galesburg teams played as members of the Eastern Iowa League (1895), Central Interstate League (1890), Illinois-Iowa League (1890), Illinois-Missouri League (1908–1909), and Central Association (1910–1912, 1914).

Baseball Hall of Fame members Grover Cleveland Alexander (1909) and Sam Rice (1912) played for Galesburg. Rice left the Galesburg team in 1912, when his wife, two children, parents, and two sisters were killed in a tornado. Galesburg teams played at Illinois Field (1908–1912, 1914), Lombard College Field (1908–1912, 1914) and Willard Field at Knox College (1890, 1895).

Lombard College was in Galesburg until 1930, and is now the site of Lombard Middle School.

The Carr Mansion at 560 North Prairie Street was the site of a presidential cabinet meeting held in 1899 by U.S. President William McKinley and U.S. Secretary of State John Hay.

== Geography ==
Galesburg is in western Knox County. Interstate 74 runs through the east side of the city, leading southeast 47 miles (76 km) to Peoria and north 36 miles (58 km) to Interstate 80 near the Quad Cities area.

According to the 2021 census gazetteer files, Galesburg has a total area of 17.94 square miles (46.46 km^{2}), of which 17.76 square miles (46.00 km^{2}) (or 99.01%) is land and 0.18 square miles (0.47 km^{2}) (or 0.99%) is water.

=== Climate ===
Climate data for Galesburg, Illinois (1991–2020 normals, extremes 1896–present)
Month	Jan	Feb	Mar	Apr	May	Jun	Jul	Aug	Sep	Oct	Nov	Dec	Year
Record high °F (°C)	68 (20)	71 (22)	86 (30)	91 (33)	96 (36)	102 (39)	112 (44)	102 (39)	100 (38)	94 (34)	79 (26)	70 (21)	112 (44)
Mean daily maximum °F (°C)	30.0 (−1.1)	34.7 (1.5)	48.0 (8.9)	61.3 (16.3)	72.0 (22.2)	81.2 (27.3)	84.0 (28.9)	82.3 (27.9)	76.2 (24.6)	63.0 (17.2)	48.0 (8.9)	35.4 (1.9)	59.7 (15.4)
Daily mean °F (°C)	21.9 (−5.6)	26.0 (−3.3)	38.0 (3.3)	50.6 (10.3)	61.8 (16.6)	71.6 (22.0)	74.7 (23.7)	72.8 (22.7)	65.5 (18.6)	52.8 (11.6)	39.0 (3.9)	27.8 (−2.3)	50.2 (10.1)
Mean daily minimum °F (°C)	13.8 (−10.1)	17.3 (−8.2)	28.1 (−2.2)	39.9 (4.4)	51.7 (10.9)	62.0 (16.7)	65.4 (18.6)	63.4 (17.4)	54.7 (12.6)	42.5 (5.8)	29.9 (−1.2)	20.2 (−6.6)	40.7 (4.8)
Record low °F (°C)	−27 (−33)	−28 (−33)	−14 (−26)	9 (−13)	24 (−4)	36 (2)	42 (6)	41 (5)	19 (−7)	17 (−8)	−6 (−21)	−22 (−30)	−28 (−33)
Average precipitation inches (mm)	1.69 (43)	1.87 (47)	2.39 (61)	3.83 (97)	5.27 (134)	4.58 (116)	4.04 (103)	3.89 (99)	3.85 (98)	2.82 (72)	2.60 (66)	2.14 (54)	38.97 (990)
Average snowfall inches (cm)	9.0 (23)	6.6 (17)	2.3 (5.8)	0.4 (1.0)	0.0 (0.0)	0.0 (0.0)	0.0 (0.0)	0.0 (0.0)	0.0 (0.0)	0.0 (0.0)	1.7 (4.3)	5.9 (15)	25.9 (66)
Average precipitation days (≥ 0.01 in)	7.9	6.9	8.7	10.6	11.9	9.8	8.1	8.5	7.0	8.8	7.7	8.1	104.0
Average snowy days (≥ 0.1 in)	5.0	3.5	1.5	0.2	0.0	0.0	0.0	0.0	0.0	0.0	0.8	3.3	14.3
Source: NOAA

== Demographics ==
Historical population
Census	Pop.	Note	%±
1850	323		—
1860	4,953		1,433.4%
1870	10,158		105.1%
1880	11,437		12.6%
1890	15,264		33.5%
1900	18,607		21.9%
1910	22,089		18.7%
1920	23,834		7.9%
1930	28,830		21.0%
1940	28,876		0.2%
1950	31,425		8.8%
1960	37,243		18.5%
1970	36,290		−2.6%
1980	35,305		−2.7%
1990	33,530		−5.0%
2000	33,706		0.5%
2010	32,195		−4.5%
2020	30,052		−6.7%
Decennial US Census

=== Racial and ethnic composition ===
Galesburg city, Illinois – Racial and ethnic composition Note: the US Census treats Hispanic/Latino as an ethnic category. This table excludes Latinos from the racial categories and assigns them to a separate category. Hispanics/Latinos may be of any race.
Race / Ethnicity (NH = Non-Hispanic)	Pop 2000	Pop 2010	Pop 2020	% 2000	% 2010	% 2020
White alone (NH)	27,688	25,114	21,088	82.15%	78.01%	70.17%
Black or African American alone (NH)	3,402	3,630	4,215	10.09%	11.28%	14.03%
Native American or Alaska Native alone (NH)	64	56	47	0.19%	0.17%	0.16%
Asian alone (NH)	345	284	301	1.02%	0.88%	1.00%
Native Hawaiian or Pacific Islander alone (NH)	8	7	7	0.02%	0.02%	0.02%
Other race alone (NH)	25	39	172	0.07%	0.12%	0.57%
Mixed race or Multiracial (NH)	486	828	1,670	1.44%	2.57%	5.56%
Hispanic or Latino (any race)	1,688	2,327	2,552	5.01%	6.95%	8.49%
Total	33,706	32,195	30,052	100.00%	100.00%	100.00%

=== 2020 census ===
As of the 2020 census, Galesburg had a population of 30,052. The population density was 1,675.42 inhabitants per square mile (646.88/km^{2}). 99.3% of residents lived in urban areas, while 0.7% lived in rural areas.

There were 12,425 households in Galesburg, of which 24.1% had children under the age of 18 living in them. Of all households, 32.9% were married-couple households, 22.8% were households with a male householder and no spouse or partner present, and 36.0% were households with a female householder and no spouse or partner present. About 40.7% of all households were made up of individuals and 19.2% had someone living alone who was 65 years of age or older. There were 6,060 families residing in the city.

The median age was 41.3 years. 19.2% of residents were under the age of 18 and 21.5% of residents were 65 years of age or older. For every 100 females there were 103.0 males, and for every 100 females age 18 and over there were 102.0 males age 18 and over.

There were 13,939 housing units, of which 10.9% were vacant. The homeowner vacancy rate was 3.0% and the rental vacancy rate was 8.8%.

Racial composition as of the 2020 census
Race	Number	Percent
White	21,916	72.9%
Black or African American	4,315	14.4%
American Indian and Alaska Native	89	0.3%
Asian	303	1.0%
Native Hawaiian and Other Pacific Islander	11	0.0%
Some other race	1,010	3.4%
Two or more races	2,408	8.0%

== Festivals ==
Galesburg is the home of the Railroad Days festival, held on the fourth weekend of June. The festival began in 1977 as an open house to the public from the then Burlington Northern. Burlington Northern gave train car tours of their yards. The city started having street fairs to draw more people to town. In 1981, the Galesburg Railroad Museum was founded and opened during Railroad Days. For a while, the city and the railroad worked together on the celebrations. In 2002, the railroad backed out of the festival and there were no yard tours. In 2003 the city worked with local groups to revamp the festival and the Galesburg Railroad Museum resumed bus tours of the yards. The Galesburg Railroad Museum has continued to provide tours of the yards since then. In 2010, the Galesburg Railroad Museum started offering a VIP tour of the yards, in which a select group of riders are allowed in the Hump Towers and Diesel Shop to see the BNSF at work. During the festival, one of the largest model railroad train shows and layouts in the U.S. Midwest is held at the Albert & Elbert Kimbrough Fieldhouse on the Galesburg High School campus.

On Labor Day weekend, Galesburg hosts the National Stearman Fly-In. Also in September are the Great Cardboard Boat Regatta and the Annual Rubber Duck Race, at Lake Storey. On the third weekend of August, a Civil War and pre-1840s rendezvous is held at Lake Storey Park.

== Transportation ==
Amtrak, the national passenger rail system, provides service from Chicago on four trains daily. It operates the California Zephyr, Carl Sandburg, Illinois Zephyr, and Southwest Chief daily from Chicago Union Station to Galesburg station and points west. The Southwest Chief and the state-supported Carl Sandburg and Illinois Zephyr take passengers to Chicago or points west, while the California Zephyr discharges passengers only on its eastbound run since the other trains provide ample service.

Galesburg Transit provides bus service in the city. There are four routes: Gold Express Loop, Green Central Loop, Red West Loop, and Blue East Loop. BNSF provides rail freight to Galesburg and operates a large hump yard 1.9 miles (3.1 km) south of town.

Galesburg is served by Interstate 74, which runs north to Moline in the Quad Cities region, and southeast to Peoria and beyond. The Chicago–Kansas City Expressway, also known as Illinois Route 110, runs through Galesburg. To the southwest it passes through Macomb, the home of Western Illinois University, and toward Quincy, before crossing into Missouri. Galesburg served is served by U.S. Routes 34 and 150. US 34 connects Galesburg to Burlington, Iowa, and Chicago. It is a freeway through its entire run in Galesburg and west to Monmouth. It connects to Galesburg through three interchanges at West Main Street, North Henderson Street, and North Seminary Street, along with an additional interchange at Interstate 74. US 150 runs through the heart of Galesburg. It enters the city as Grand Avenue from the southeast, runs through downtown as Main Street, and exits the city as North Henderson Street. Galesburg is additionally served by Illinois State Route 97, Route 41, Route 164, and Knox County highways 1, 7, 9, 10, 25, 30, 31, and 40.

The Harrel W. Timmons Galesburg Regional Airport provides general aviation access, and is home to the National Stearman Fly-in annually. Quad City International Airport and General Wayne A. Downing Peoria International Airport provide commercial flights to local residents.

Galesburg will be home to the National Railroad Hall of Fame. Funding has been secured, and design of the museum is set to begin in 2026.

== Media ==
Galesburg has several radio stations and newspapers delivering a mix of local, regional, and national news. WGIL-AM, WAAG, WLSR-FM, WZIE-FM and WKAY-FM are all owned by Galesburg Broadcasting. KZZ66 provides weather information for NOAA Weather Radio in the Galesburg area. Galesburg was also home to AM 1590 WAIK from 1957 to 2019.

The Galesburg Register-Mail is the result of the merger of the Galesburg Republican-Register and the Galesburg Daily Mail in 1927. The two papers trace their roots to the mid-19th century. A daily, it is the city's main newspaper, and was owned by Copley Press until it was sold to Gate House Media in 2007. The Zephyr was started in 1989, was published on Thursdays, and was the only locally owned newspaper until its final edition on December 9, 2010. The New Zephyr began publication in 2013. It is published every Friday. The Knoxville Bulletin is a weekly newspaper established in 2016. It is owned by Limestone Publishing.

Galesburg is part of the Quad Cities television market.

=== FM radio ===
- 90.7 WVKC "Tri States Public Radio", supported by Western Illinois University and Knox College Tri States Public Radio (NPR Affiliate with HD Radio subchannels)
- 92.7 WLSR "92.7 FM The Laser", Active Rock (RDS – Artist/Title)
- 93.7 W229BO (Translates AM 1400 WGIL)
- 94.9 WAAG "FM 95", Country (RDS – Artist/Title)
- 100.5 W263AO (Translates 91.5 WCIC), Christian AC (RDS)
- 105.3 WKAY "105.3 KFM", Adult Contemporary (RDS – Artist/Title)
- 106.1 WZIE "Z106.1", Classic Hits (RDS-Artist/Title)

=== AM radio ===
- 1400 WGIL, News/Talk

=== Web radio ===
- KGB-Radio "Knox Galesburg Radio", Galesburg Area News Weather and Maps

=== Print ===
- The Paper, local weekly (free) newspaper (in the Register-Mail every Wednesday)
- Register-Mail, local daily newspaper
- The Zephyr, local weekly newspaper (discontinued in 2010)
- The New Zephyr, local weekly newspaper (on hiatus as of December 2013)
- Knoxville Bulletin, local weekly newspaper (started in May 2016)
- The Burg, local weekly newspaper (started in summer of 2019)

== In popular culture ==
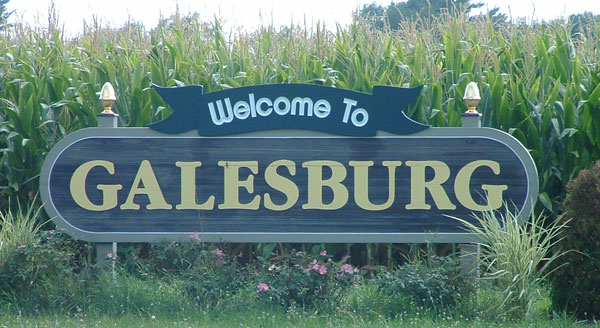
"Welcome to Galesburg" sign

- Galesburg is the birthplace of George Washington Gale Ferris Jr., inventor of the Ferris wheel.
- According to legend, the four Marx Brothers (Groucho, Chico, Harpo, and Gummo) first received their nicknames at Galesburg's Gaity Theatre in 1914. Nicknames ending in -o were popular in the early 20th century, and a fellow vaudevillian, Art Fisher, supposedly bestowed them upon the brothers during a poker game there. Zeppo Marx received his nickname later.
- Barack Obama mentioned Galesburg during his keynote address at the 2004 Democratic National Convention and near the beginning of his 2010 State of the Union Address. Obama also visited Galesburg High School in 2011 to speak to students while in the area for a Midwestern bus tour.
- Baseball legend Jimmie Foxx lived out some of his last years as a greeter at a steakhouse in Galesburg. Foxx left just before his death in 1967.
- Ronald Reagan attended second grade at Silas Willard Elementary School between 1917 and 1918. He portrayed pitcher Grover Cleveland Alexander in the movie The Winning Team in 1952, starting with Alexander's stint with the minor-league Galesburg Boosters.
- Galesburg is the birthplace of artist Stephen Prina, whose recent publication Galesburg, Illinois+ documents an exhibition that portrays the town indirectly through various media.
- The first stage of the NES game Ninja Gaiden is in Galesburg, depicted as more like New York City.
- Galesburg is the setting of the 1981 slasher film Strange Behavior.
