= 1460 AM =

AM radio frequency

The following radio stations broadcast on AM frequency 1460 kHz: 1460 AM is a Regional broadcast frequency.

== Argentina ==
- LT29 in Venado Tuerto, Santa Fe
- LU30 in Maipu, Buenos Aires
- LU34 Pigüé, Buenos Aires
- LRK204 in Yerba Buena, Tucuman
- Contacto AM 1460Khz.- San Antonio de Padua - Buenos Aires

== Canada ==
- CJOY in Guelph, Ontario - 10 kW, transmitter located at 43.485833°N 80.245°W

== Guatemala (Channel 93) ==
- TGRN in Flores

== Mexico ==
- XEYC-AM in Ciudad Juárez, Chihuahua
- XECB-AM in San Luis Río Colorado, Sonora

== United States ==
| Call sign | City of license | Facility ID | Class | Daytime power (kW) | Nighttime power (kW) | Unlimited power (kW) | Transmitter coordinates |
|---|---|---|---|---|---|---|---|
| KBRZ | Missouri City, Texas | 12156 | D | 5 | 0.125 | | 29.564444°N 95.701667°W |
| KBZO | Lubbock, Texas | 9705 | B | 1 | 0.243 | | 33.547222°N 101.823056°W |
| KCKX | Stayton, Oregon | 65569 | D | 1 | 0.015 | | 44.802778°N 122.734167°W |
| KCLE | Burleson, Texas | 59263 | B | 11 | 0.7 | | 32.578611°N 97.280556°W |
| KCNR | Shasta, California | 64414 | B | 0.75 | 0.75 | | 40.553889°N 122.381389°W |
| KCWM | Hondo, Texas | 21673 | B | 0.5 | 0.226 | | 29.361667°N 99.128333°W |
| KDMA | Montevideo, Minnesota | 18052 | B | 1 | 1 | | 44.934722°N 95.7475°W |
| KDWA | Hastings, Minnesota | 32986 | D | 1 | 0.041 | | 44.737222°N 92.828333°W |
| KENO | Las Vegas, Nevada | 38449 | B | 10 | 0.62 | | 36.190278°N 115.176389°W |
| KHOJ | St. Charles, Missouri | 7114 | B | 12 | 0.21 | | 38.834722°N 90.468889°W |
| KION | Salinas, California | 26925 | B | 10 | 10 | | 36.733056°N 121.592222°W |
| KKAQ | Thief River Falls, Minnesota | 3244 | D | 2.5 | 0.15 | | 48.123611°N 96.141944°W |
| KKOY | Chanute, Kansas | 48292 | D | 1 | 0.057 | | 37.688333°N 95.47°W |
| KLTC | Dickinson, North Dakota | 71870 | B | 5 | 0.77 | | 46.848889°N 102.829722°W |
| KRRS | Santa Rosa, California | 43710 | D | 1 | 0.033 | | 38.370278°N 122.7275°W |
| KTKC | Springhill, Louisiana | 62035 | B | 1 | 0.22 | | 33.007778°N 93.478611°W |
| KTYM | Inglewood, California | 67519 | B | 5 | 0.5 | | 34.0075°N 118.365°W |
| KXNO | Des Moines, Iowa | 12964 | B | 5 | 5 | | 41.645833°N 93.536667°W |
| KXPN | Kearney, Nebraska | 52803 | D | 5 | 0.056 | | 40.7125°N 99.170833°W |
| KZNT | Colorado Springs, Colorado | 70825 | B | 5 | 0.54 | | 38.826111°N 104.741389°W |
| KZUE | El Reno, Oklahoma | 36185 | D | 0.5 | | | 35.508333°N 97.9°W |
| WBCU | Union, South Carolina | 7088 | D | 1 | 0.106 | | 34.719444°N 81.662222°W |
| WBMS | Brockton, Massachusetts | 19631 | D | 5 | 0.03 | | 42.050278°N 71.061667°W |
| WBNS | Columbus, Ohio | 54901 | B | 5 | 1 | | 39.951667°N 82.906389°W |
| WBOG | Tomah, Wisconsin | 52533 | D | 1 | | | 43.968611°N 90.513889°W |
| WBRN | Big Rapids, Michigan | 70506 | B | 5 | 2.5 | | 43.663611°N 85.481667°W |
| WBUC | Buckhannon, West Virginia | 9301 | D | 5.5 | 0.024 | | 38.974444°N 80.207222°W |
| WCCD | Painesville, Ohio | 13685 | B | 1 | 0.5 | | 41.738889°N 81.235833°W |
| WEEN | Lafayette, Tennessee | 36220 | D | 1.1 | 0.119 | | 36.535°N 86.0075°W |
| WEKB | Elkhorn City, Kentucky | 32972 | D | 5 | 0.114 | | 37.306944°N 82.331389°W |
| WELZ | Belzoni, Mississippi | 28116 | D | 1 | | | 33.173333°N 90.480833°W |
| WEWO | Laurinburg, North Carolina | 9077 | B | 5 | 5 | | 34.783333°N 79.511111°W |
| WGMM | Tunkhannock, Pennsylvania | 19563 | B | 5 | 1 | | 41.562778°N 75.969722°W |
| WHBK | Marshall, North Carolina | 61264 | D | 5 | 0.139 | | 35.801111°N 82.68°W |
| WHIC | Rochester, New York | 6641 | B | 3.7 | 5 | | 43.083056°N 77.647778°W |
| WHTY | Phenix City/Columbus, Alabama | 32383 | B | 4 | 0.14 | | 32.432778°N 84.950556°W |
| WIFI | Florence, New Jersey | 55310 | B | 5 | 0.5 | | 40.081389°N 74.794722°W |
| WIXN | Dixon, Illinois | 21201 | D | 1 | 0.023 | | 41.827222°N 89.486389°W |
| WJAK | Jackson, Tennessee | 54035 | D | 0.8 | 0.105 | | 35.643611°N 88.773333°W |
| WJCP | North Vernon, Indiana | 61196 | D | 1 | 0.092 | | 38.996111°N 85.650556°W |
| WJTI | West Allis, Wisconsin | 68759 | B | 1 | 0.24 | | 43.008889°N 88.035°W |
| WKAM | Goshen, Indiana | 49559 | B | 2.5 | 0.5 | | 41.587222°N 85.819444°W |
| WKDV | Manassas, Virginia | 8672 | B | 5 | 5 | | 38.75°N 77.513611°W |
| WKHZ | Easton, Maryland | 11667 | B | 1 | 0.5 | | 38.770278°N 76.081944°W |
| WKJR | Rantoul, Illinois | 57467 | D | 0.5 | 0.065 | | 40.310278°N 88.215°W |
| WLRP | San Sebastian, Puerto Rico | 36637 | B | | | 0.5 | 18.347222°N 66.998889°W |
| WMBA | Ambridge, Pennsylvania | 17266 | B | 0.11 | 0.12 | | 40.585556°N 80.203056°W |
| WOPG | Albany, New York | 72117 | B | 5 | 5 | | 42.6225°N 73.8025°W |
| WPON | Walled Lake, Michigan | 22045 | B | 0.67 | 0.58 | | 42.544167°N 83.56°W |
| WQOP | Jacksonville, Florida | 51976 | B | 15 | 5 | | 30.327778°N 81.746944°W |
| WQXM | Bartow, Florida | 71202 | D | 10 | 0.155 | | 27.909444°N 81.858056°W |
| WRAD | Radford, Virginia | 73919 | D | 5 | 0.037 | | 37.142778°N 80.577222°W |
| WRKB | Kannapolis, North Carolina | 22029 | D | 2 | 0.194 | | 35.487222°N 80.605°W |
| WROY | Carmi, Illinois | 9011 | D | 1 | 0.085 | | 38.0825°N 88.201667°W |
| WRRE | Juncos, Puerto Rico | 54564 | B | 0.5 | 0.27 | | 18.215°N 65.909167°W |
| WRVK | Mount Vernon, Kentucky | 14732 | D | 1.2 | 0.093 | | 37.396944°N 84.329167°W |
| WTKT | Harrisburg, Pennsylvania | 23463 | B | 5 | 4.2 | | 40.308889°N 76.936944°W |
| WVOX | New Rochelle, New York | 28024 | D | 0.5 | 0.122 | | 40.9275°N 73.775°W (daytime); 40.9275°N 73.774722°W (nighttime) |
| WXEM | Buford, Georgia | 36158 | B | 5 | 0.193 | | 34.120833°N 83.976389°W |
| WXOK | Port Allen, Louisiana | 11606 | B | 4 | 0.28 | | 30.473889°N 91.226389°W |
| WXRQ | Mount Pleasant, Tennessee | 48497 | D | 1 | 0.169 | | 35.5225°N 87.192778°W |
| WZEP | DeFuniak Springs, Florida | 70821 | D | 10 | 0.186 | | 30.729167°N 86.117778°W |
