= Doug Quick =

American broadcast weatherman, author and museum curator

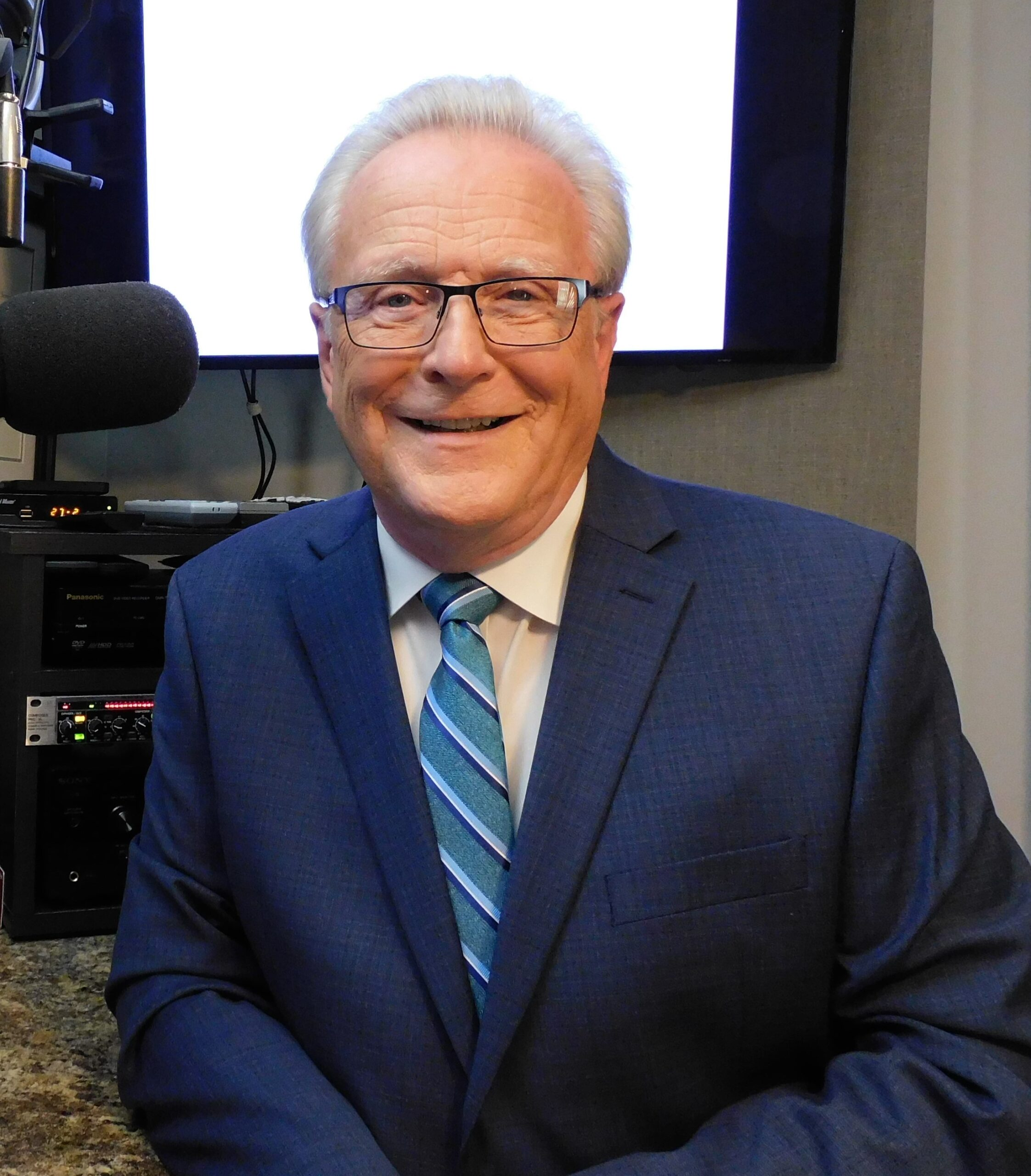
- Born: 1954 (age 71–72); Taylorville, Illinois, United States
- Education: Lincoln Land Community College; Western Illinois University
- Occupations: Weather broadcaster, author, virtual museum curator
- Years active: 1974–present
- Television: WCCU (TV) & WBUI; 2010 – 2021; WICD (TV); 1994–2021
- Presenting career
- Stations: WTIM; WTAX (AM); WDBR; WTAX (AM); WDBR; WDAN/WMBJ; WDNL; WDZ/WDZQ; WWDZ(FM)
- Website: dougquick.com

Doug Quick (born in 1954) is an American broadcast weather newsman, author and web museum curator. He is best known as the news weather anchor at WCCU Fox-Illinois 27, serving Champaign, Urbana and Danville, Illinois. When he retired in 2021, after 47 years in broadcasting, he was Central Illinois' longest tenured weathercaster.

== Early life and education ==
Quick was born in 1954 in Taylorville, Illinois to Robert and Bette Quick. He graduated from Taylorville High School and Lincoln Land Community College. He also studied mass communications and radio & television at Western Illinois University.

== Career ==
Quick began his broadcasting career in 1974 at WTIM AM & FM in Taylorville, Illinois. He worked 47 years in the broadcasting industry. When he retired in 2021 he was Central Illinois' longest serving weather broadcaster.

=== Television ===
In 1994 Quick joined WICD (channel 15) in Champaign, Illinois. He served as promotions director, later becoming co-anchor of Sunrise Today, host of the public affairs Spotlight 15, providing newscasts and local weather over a 10-year period.
He began doing weather for WCCU in 2010, then in 2015 he became news/weather anchor at WCCU (TV) FOX 27, serving Champaign, Urbana and Danville, Illinois, where he remained until his retirement on September 30, 2021.

=== Radio ===
Quick continued to work as an announcer at WTIM AM & FM when he returned to college at Western Illinois University. He also worked the summer of 1976 for WTAX (AM) and WDBR in Springfield, then returned to WTIM/WEEE(FM) in Taylorville as program director and sales for WEEE. In 1977 he moved to Danville's WDAN/WMBJ where he helped convert it to Top-40 WDNL. Except for a brief stint in 1979 as announcer & DJ and sales at WDZ/WDZQ in Decatur and a year in 1993 at WWDZ(FM) in Danville as sales manager, he spent most of the next 25 years at WDNL as announcer/DJ, sales executive, sales manager and eventually becoming general manager. For eight years, from 1994 to 2002 he worked simultaneously for WDNL and WCID-TV/WCCU-TV, eventually leaving WDNL to work full time at WCID/WCCU.

=== Central Illinois' On-Line Broadcast Museum ===
In 2003 Quick developed the Central Illinois' On-Line Broadcast Museum. It is a free virtual museum website that documents, in detail, the history of television stations broadcasting in Central Illinois, United States. The museum is a record of the heritage television stations in the Illinois cities of Springfield, Decatur, Champaign, Danville, Bloomington and Peoria, and in St. Louis, Missouri. It hosts information on the building of the stations, the station owners, local programs and personalities, program schedules and hundreds of photographs and videos. Eastern Illinois University journalism instructor Joe Astrouski said "Doug's work chronicling the history of local television is a treasurer, both for those who work in TV and those who enjoy it".

Quick built the website from information he assembled from records of the FCC, local newspapers and libraries. Among the television stations covered are:

- WTVP/WAND, Decatur
- WCIA, Champaign
- WICD, Champaign
- WICS, Springfield
- WBLN, Bloomington
- WEEK, Peoria
- WTVH, Peoria
- WMBD, Peoria

The website also covers several radio stations that were heard in Illinois from Chicago to St. Louis.

=== Author ===
In 2018 Quick released Pictures on the Prairie – The First Ten Years of Mid-Illinois Television, a 500-page book in which he tells the stories of the pioneer television broadcasters of Central Illinois.

=== Awards and recognitions ===
- 2013 National Academy of Television Arts and Sciences Silver Circle Award
- 2017 Illinois Broadcasters Association Silver Dome Award "Best TV Anchor"
- 2022 Illinois Broadcasters Association W. Russell Withers Jr. Downstate Broadcast Pioneer
- 2024 Illiana Genealogical & Historical Society Foundation's Historical Preservation Award
- 2024 103rd Illinois General Assembly Commendation HR0626

== Personal life ==
Quick is married to Melissa Quick. They have two adult daughters and reside in Vermilion County, Illinois
