= WTIM (disambiguation) =

WTIM may refer to:

- WTIM, a radio station (870 AM) licensed to serve Assumption, Illinois, United States
- WRAN (FM), a radio station (97.3 FM) licensed to serve Taylorville, Illinois, which held the call sign WTIM-FM from 1997 to 2014
- WIHM (AM), a radio station (1410 AM) licensed to serve Taylorville, which held the call sign WTIM until 1995 and again from 1995 to 1998
