= WTAX =

WTAX may refer to:

- WTAX (AM), a radio station (1240 AM) licensed to serve Springfield, Illinois, United States
- WTAX-FM, a radio station (93.9 FM) licensed to serve Sherman, Illinois
