= WQQL =

WQQL may refer to:

- WTAX-FM, a radio station (93.9 FM) licensed to serve Sherman, Illinois, United States, which held the call sign WQQL from 2013 to 2021
- WLFZ, a radio station (101.9 FM) licensed to serve Springfield, Illinois, which held the call sign WQQL from 1993 to 2013
