= WIHM =

WIHM may refer to:

- WIHM (AM), a radio station (1410 AM) licensed to serve Taylorville, Illinois, United States
- WIHM-FM, a radio station (88.1 FM) licensed to serve Harrisburg, Illinois
