= FM Non-Duplication Rule =

U.S. government regulation requiring 50% original content on FM radio stations

The FM Non-Duplication Rule was adopted by the U.S. Federal Communications Commission (FCC) on July 1, 1964, after a year's consideration. It limited holders of FM licenses in cities of more than 100,000 who also held AM licenses to simulcasting no more than 50 percent of their AM signal on the FM station. The commissioners considered the excessive simulcasting wasteful and an impediment to the development of FM broadcasting. A year later, the FCC reaffirmed the rule, and, after a delay requested by broadcasters, set its effective date for October 1965; some stations were granted exemptions if they could demonstrate their simulcasting served the public good.

Broadcasters generally resisted the rule at first, claiming it was overregulation that would impose considerable costs on stations for new personnel and equipment. It was challenged in court as a violation of the First Amendment and upheld in a decision written by future Supreme Court Chief Justice Warren Burger. Later the FCC extended the rule's requirements to 75 percent original content on FM stations and its applicability to stations in cities of more than 25,000.

The rule's implementation led to the rise of freeform radio in the late 1960s, where disc jockeys played whatever music they wanted without regard to genre or format, taking advantage of FM's higher sound quality and stereo capability. Most of their playlists tended toward rock of the era; in later years the canon of music and artists that developed evolved into the album-oriented and eventually classic rock formats. This growth often came at the expense of the classical music stations which had previously dominated the FM dial. By the late 1970s FM music stations had more listeners than their AM counterparts, even as they had largely moved away from their freeform roots, and in March 1986 the FCC repealed the rule to help AM stations, which had declined as FM grew.

== Background ==
Since the advent of commercial radio broadcasting in the United States during the 1920s, broadcasters and listeners had lamented the problem of static on its AM signals, usually created by interference from electrical storms. Engineers began to work on developing technology to transmit and receive higher-frequency signals above 40MHz over great distances. By the mid-1930s, Edwin Howard Armstrong had developed frequency modulation (FM) technology that could propagate signals widely with no static at all.

Several issues hindered FM's commercial establishment until the late 1940s. One was litigation over patents between Armstrong and RCA, Armstrong's former employer. RCA had chosen to invest heavily in television, another new technology. Regulatory disputes with the newly created Federal Communications Commission and the intervention of World War II also played a role. Many FM stations soon had to shut down for lack of a market, despite the superior audio quality they offered, since listeners had to purchase FM-capable receivers. Armstrong's suicide in 1954 further adversely affected FM since he had financially supported Continental, one of the few FM networks at the time.

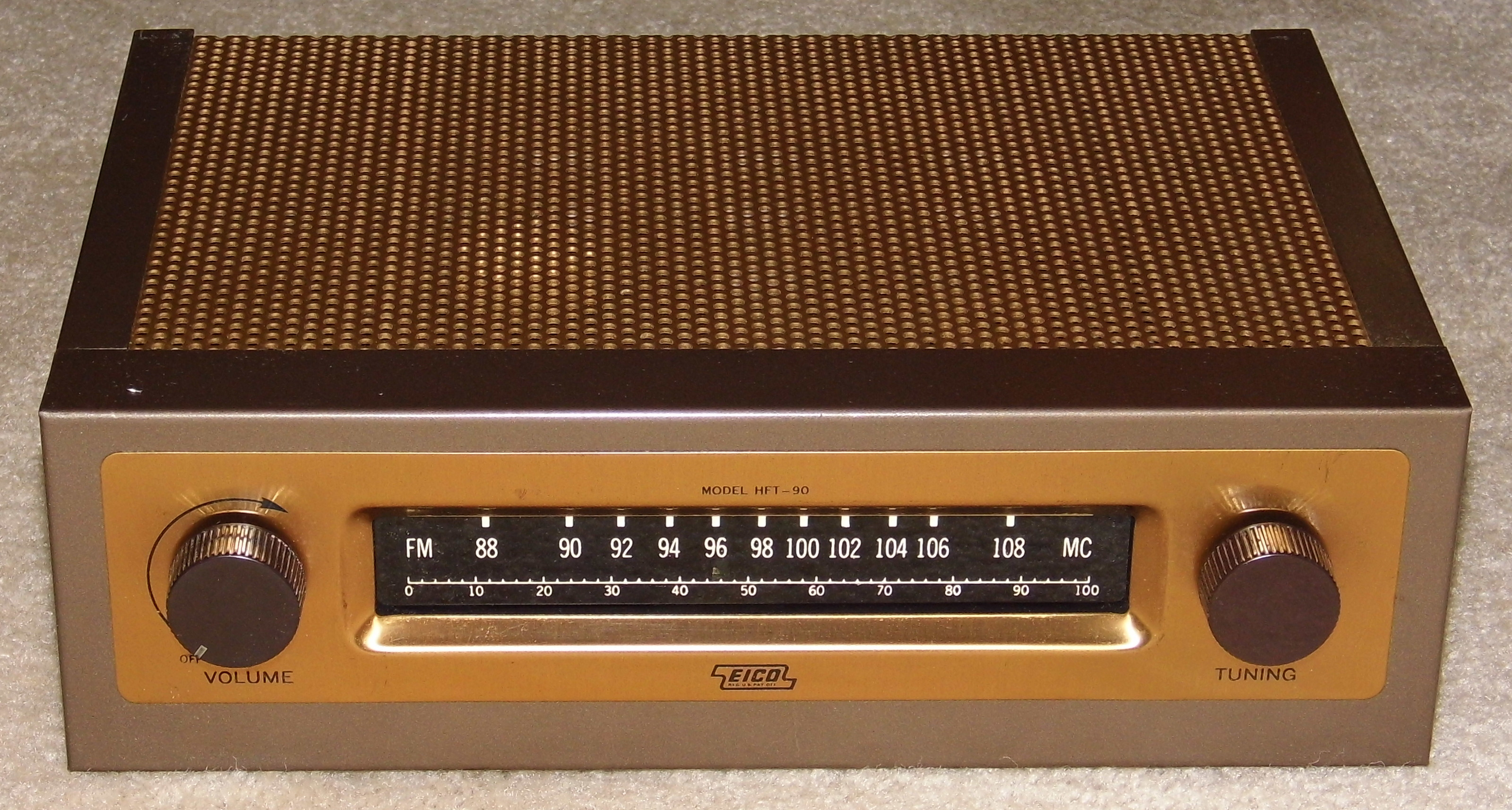
1959 FM receiver

FM's fortunes began to turn in the late 1950s with television's rapid growth and AM radio's increasingly crowded dial. Popular music formats replaced scripted radio programming and variety shows migrated to TV. This left broadcasters looking for new directions to expand their markets. In 1957 the number of applications for FM licenses increased for the first time in almost a decade, primarily in smaller markets that had run out of space for new television or AM channels. In larger markets, the proliferation of AM stations had led the FCC to restrict many of the newer ones to daytime-only to avoid interference; since the FCC did not require that restriction for FM radio, it was a logical place for broadcasters to go.

The increasing popularity of stereophonic recordings also helped FM's growth. In 1952, New York City-area classical music station WQXR had hit on the idea of simulcasting on its AM and FM stations, with each carrying a different channel, so listeners could use two radios to create a stereo experience; other stations, mostly classical and jazz, followed the practice. Because the FCC frowned on that as a waste of spectrum, in 1961 it approved technical standards for wideband FM stereo broadcasting via the multiplexing capability of the higher frequencies and the first full-stereo wideband FM stations began broadcasting within months. Many existing FM stations still carried the same signal as their AM sister stations, assuming that FM was merely an added bonus for listeners who wanted the higher sound quality and were willing to pay for equipment to get it. Broadcasters at the time saw such little value in their FM stations that they gave advertising time away with purchases on their AM stations.

== Rule ==
=== Proposition, adoption, and criticism ===
By 1963 the FCC was dominated by Kennedy administration appointees, led by chairman Newton Minow, who were interested in increasing competition in certain sectors of the radio market. That year the commission first discussed the possibility of restricting AM-FM duplication. While it had tolerated the practice initially since it allowed FM stations to get on the air, it now saw it as a waste of spectrum.

The commissioners settled on a rule that limited AM stations licensed in cities of more than 100,000 people to no more than 50 percent duplication of their AM signal on an affiliated FM station. Duplication was defined as either the simulcasting of the signal or its rebroadcast within 24 hours. Stations had until August 1965 to comply.

"[T]he broadcast of a single program by two channels is inefficient" the FCC explained in its 1964 annual report. "The Commission feels that this is a significant move toward the time when AM and FM will be regarded as component parts of a total aural service for assignment purposes" it said. It hoped also that it would "give new impetus to FM developments."

Many broadcasters resisted the new rule, citing the costs it would impose on them to hire air staff and find studio space for the additional FM content. In early 1965, the FCC extended the deadline for compliance two months, until October of that year, and announced that stations that could demonstrate their simulcasting served the public good would be exempted from the rule. Commissioner Kenneth Cox spoke in defense of the rule at the 1965 convention of the National Association of Broadcasters (NAB), the industry trade group. Generally, he said, duplication was "a luxury we can't afford". More specifically, he also pointed to the unfair advantage simulcast FM stations had over those that had no AM counterpart, since the former sold their advertising time at no additional charge to advertisers who bought time on the AM station.

In response, Ben Strouse, president of Washington's WWDC-FM and chair of the NAB's FM committee, said that his market was already well served and that requiring additional programming would leave many stations pursuing market segments too small to support them, to the detriment of the industry and the FCC's good intentions. "[S]ometimes the love of a government agency can be the kiss of death" he warned. While praising the FCC's general support for FM, he said, the agency "loves [it] too much."

At least one broadcaster from a smaller market did not seem to mind. Oliver Keller, the president of WTAX in Springfield, Illinois, told The New York Times he welcomed the rule as serving the public interest. He was already offering different programming anyway on his AM and FM stations, telling the newspaper that the next day the former would be broadcasting live coverage of the Gemini 3 spaceflight launch while the latter would continue playing music.

Almost 150 stations filed for exemptions; the FCC granted 30 of them on a long-term basis. Most were for stations whose AM signal was still restricted to the daylight hours. Two were for New York stations that broadcast in foreign languages and also had constraints on their programming. WHOM (now WZRC and WNYL respectively), was a daytime-only station which broadcast in Spanish, and Yiddish-language WEVD, which shared its frequency with two other stations. Two stations in Puerto Rico were also granted long-term exemptions for purely technical reasons: their FM transmissions were the only way their signals could reach the entire island. An additional 12 stations were granted short-term exemptions for economic reasons, because they needed more time and money to get a separate FM service set up.

=== Legal challenge ===
Buckley-Jaeger Broadcasting Corporation of California v. Federal Communications Commission
- Court: United States Court of Appeals for the District of Columbia Circuit
- Citation: 397 F.2d 651

Case history
- Prior actions: In the Matter of Requests for Exemption From or Waiver of the Provisions of Section 73.242 of the Commission's Rules, 8 F.C.C. 2d 1, 2-5 (1967)
- Appealed from: Federal Communications Commission

Court membership
- Judges sitting: David L. Bazelon, Barrett Prettyman, Warren Burger

Case opinions
- FCC rule limiting stations in large markets from duplicating more than 50% of signal on AM and FM stations was both within scope of agency's authority and constitutional, as applicant was not severely encumbered in continuing its classical-music format, nor was applicant improperly denied a hearing by the commission as it had not shown sufficient reason for one.
- Decision by: Burger

Keywords
- radio; regulation; format

By the beginning of 1967, after several additional delays and requests for exemptions, Section 73.242 of the FCC's code of regulations had been amended and the rule had taken full effect. Shortly afterward, San Francisco's KKHI, one of the stations to which the FCC had granted a temporary exemption good through April of that year, appealed the denial of its application for a permanent exemption to the United States Court of Appeals for the District of Columbia, which has appellate jurisdiction over administrative actions of federal agencies. KKHI also challenged the Non-Duplication Rule itself as being outside the FCC's authority and an unconstitutional infringement of its right to freedom of speech under the First Amendment.

KKHI had sought its exemption primarily on the grounds that it was the only classical music station in the Bay Area. As evidence that the exemption was in the public interest, it introduced a survey of its listeners showing that they strongly supported continued simulcasting, especially since they liked to listen both at home and in their cars. (Note: While radio manufacturers were beginning to included FM on car radios at that time, they were not implementing stereo systems to properly take advantage of it, as it was still generally considered a luxury item by auto manufacturers. Not until 1976 did the majority of car radios include FM.) Further, KKHI argued that the costs of compliance would be prohibitive and that it had the exclusive right to decide what programming to offer its listeners without the FCC's interference. It made an additional argument on procedural grounds, that the commission should have at least held a hearing before denying the exemption application.

The circuit's chief judge, David L. Bazelon, was chosen for the panel that would hear the case. With him were E. Barrett Prettyman, a former chief judge of the court now on senior status, and Warren Burger, chosen several years later to be Chief Justice of the Supreme Court. It heard oral arguments in the case in November.

In May 1968, the court handed down its decision. Unanimously, it held for the FCC. Burger wrote for the court that the commission had said that it would not consider exemptions based purely on a station's choice of programming alone, unless there was something exceptional about that programming as there was in the cases of WEVD and WHOM. Two other classical stations, New York's WQXR and Washington's WGMS, had applied for exemptions on the same grounds as KKHI and been denied, Burger noted, while KDFC, another San Francisco classical station, was granted its exemption since, unlike KKHI, it was daytime-only.

"The major premise on which the rule was postulated — wasteful frequency usage and loss of spectrum space", Burger continued, addressing the overreach argument, "was clearly the kind of judgment entrusted by Congress to the Commission." The court did not find that the requirement for 50% original programming on the FM station seriously limited the station's programming choices, since it could easily tape and rebroadcast content from either station later. Burger also noted that KKHI's economic concerns had indeed been taken into account when the commission granted the extension until April 1967.

When considering the procedural issue, Burger allowed himself some criticism of the commission, noting that given its explicit consideration of technical factors and programming as issues on which its decisions turned, it should have explicitly cited those considerations in promulgating the rule rather than refer to the nebulously defined public interest. But "[a]lthough it may well be that the rule could have been more precise, it is adequate and the Commission has given it a consistent interpretation." The rule did not explicitly state that a hearing would be granted if desired, and "[i]n these circumstances we hold that the Commission acted within its discretion in refusing to grant a hearing" as KKHI had not shown that the FCC had not considered its reasons for desiring the exemption.

== Aftermath ==
Many stations scrambled to find new staff to handle their FM-only broadcasts, and did not care about what they chose to play as long as it was enough to comply with the new rule and other FCC regulations. The newly hired staff were often young, recent college graduates who did not demand high salaries. Since the FM audience was generally older than the Top 40 AM audience, management gave DJs more independence in what they chose to play. On the air they chose to follow the example of freeform radio stations, where the disc jockeys could play whatever they wanted without a playlist defined by management. Some stations, such as San Francisco's KPFA, the first noncommercial FM station in the U.S., and Seattle's KRAB, had been freeform since even before the Non-Duplication Rule was adopted.

While the freeform DJs' tastes were often fairly eclectic, including soul music, blues, jazz, and world music, their programming was dominated by contemporary rock. Artists closely associated with the counterculture had developed audiences from their live performances and from released recordings but many did not get played on Top 40 AM stations of the time, thus earning them the term "underground" music, which was also applied briefly to the FM stations that played it. Many freeform DJs played not just singles by those bands but album tracks, beginning what later became the album-oriented rock format. Adding to the natural advantage of FM's higher sound quality, the new stations also broadcast fewer commercials between songs.

In San Francisco, Tom Donahue, a former Top 40 AM DJ who had written an article in the then-new Rolling Stone calling that medium dead, took over as program director at KMPX and expanded its freeform content from one overnight DJ's shift to the entire format. He paid particular attention to those bands coming out of the Haight-Ashbury hippie scene, such as the Grateful Dead and Jefferson Airplane, whose San Francisco Sound became the soundtrack for the 1967 Summer of Love. The Beatles' Sgt. Pepper's Lonely Hearts Club Band, also released that year, proved an ideal album for the new rock FM stations, which also included New York's WNEW and WPLJ, Chicago's WXRT, Detroit's WABX, and WHFS in Baltimore.

Freeform FM's DJs were, as their program directors had believed, more inclined to engage the audience as equals. Eschewing the frantic patter of their AM counterparts, they talked in conversational tones, avoided playing jingles, drops, or talking over the music, and addressed the audience, sometimes even engaging in on-air telephone conversations with them. They grouped work they played by a common theme they would point out to the audience, and sometimes found segues between songs that demonstrated these connections. Their willingness to play longer and less accessible work in turn led bands to record more work in this vein, giving rise to the progressive rock of the early 1970s, which had in turn come from "progressive radio", another term for the new FM rock stations.

The growth in FM programming and listeners also had an economic effect. In 1968 ABC began putting together an FM network. That same year, Philadelphia's WDVR became the first FM station to sell a million dollars in advertising. FM stations as a whole reported positive operating income for the first time.

This growth continued into the early 1970s even as many of the freeform stations became more standardized and formatted in response to the increased investment. In 1973 FM once again reported an aggregate net positive operating income, and has continued to do so every year since. By the middle of the decade most new radios included the FM band, and in 1976, the year the FCC extended the rule to limit duplication to only 25% of content in cities of more than 25,000, car radios followed suit. Finally, in 1978, FM stations achieved a greater share of the national listening audience than AM; (Note: That year FM, a film celebrating the ethos of the medium's earlier years, in which rebellious DJs lock themselves in the station to protest management's plan to run more commercials, was released. It failed at the box office, but Steely Dan's theme song for the movie, "FM (No Static At All)", became a hit single. Some AM stations that played the song spliced in the harmonically compatible "A" from the chorus of the title track of the band's recent album Aja over the "F" in the song's chorus.) in New York this shocked the city's radio community when all-disco WKTU, the former WHOM-FM whom the FCC had exempted from the rule initially, ended WABC (AM)'s long reign as the city's top-rated music station.

One unexpected consequence of FM's ascendance was a decline in the number of the classical music stations that had been early adopters of the technology. While at first many had pleased their listeners, who expected the rule would create more space for classical on the air, by offering more classical programming on FM, they soon saturated what had always been a small segment of the total radio audience. To become profitable in the new environment, many had to change their formats, to the consternation of aficionados. In New York, this led to a listener backlash that forced WNCN to return to its classical format in 1975 after nearly a year as a rock station, WQIV, so named for its effort to broadcast in quadraphonic sound. (Note: In 1993 the station again adopted a classic-rock format and became WAXQ, which it remains, leaving WQXR as the city's only classical station.)

== Repeal ==
In 1985, after one broadcaster, AGK Communications, proposed to the FCC that the hours between midnight and 6 a.m. be exempted from the rule, the commission responded by proposing to repeal the rule entirely. After taking comments, mostly from the NAB and broadcasters, the FCC repealed the rule in March 1986.

The commission concluded the rule had long since accomplished its goal. The number of FM stations had increased by almost a dozenfold in the two decades since it had gone into effect; FM stations now claimed nearly three-quarters of all radio listeners. "FM radio service is now fully competitive", the commission had said when proposing the repeal the year before. "In fact, we believe that for many AM-FM combinations it is now the case that the viability of the AM station depends on its association with a stronger FM facility."

Specifically, the FCC hoped that AM stations would now broadcast around the clock since they could depend on FM again to carry their stronger signal. It did not think many would do so, and while many broadcasters agreed there was no reason to return to full duplication, some said they hoped the repeal could help them strengthen now-struggling AM stations through this expansion of their broadcast hours. (Note: In the years preceding the repeal, the FCC's attempts to midwife the introduction of AM stereo had floundered amid heavy criticism of the science and the politics involved, after which the commission left the decision to the market, which could not agree on a standard. Ultimately AM became profitable again as many stations followed the lead of once-dominant music stations (like New York's WABC) and switched to formats of primarily talk and sports, which delivered a mostly male audience that was highly valued by advertisers as it was hard to reach through other media.) Several also believed the decision had always best been left to the market.

Two companies that commented to the FCC on the proposed repeal opposed it. Osborn Communications worried that rather than help AM, it would result in the complete collapse of the medium as all listeners would prefer to hear a station's superior sound quality on FM whatever the content. Conversely, Press Broadcasting in turn feared that AM stations that duplicated an FM signal would have a competitive advantage over those that were independent of an FM station.

By the time of the repeal, FM music stations had become as formatted and commercially driven as the AM stations had been at the time the rule went into force. Lee Abrams, an influential consultant, had developed the album-oriented rock format ("designed to sound unstructured, even if it was not", in one historian's words.) which narrowed down the FM rock playlist by focusing on popular albums, in the mid-1970s. (Note: Steely Dan's "FM" (see note above) took note of this phenomenon in the year of its release; while the movie it was from celebrated FM rock radio as a bulwark against commercialism, the song's narrator is disappointed that the FM station chosen by his fellow partygoers has forsaken the "funked-up Muzak" and "hungry reggae" of earlier days and instead plays "nothing but blues and Elvis / And somebody else's favorite songs". The song's chorus, the words "no static at all" sung in three-part harmony, thus become an ironic comment on what FM had become by 1978. "[They seem] less like a technical boast than an admission that nothing on the airwaves was likely to surprise anyone", writes critic Donald Breithaupt. "In its haste to wipe out background noise, FM had forgotten all about foreground noise.") By the 1980s this had been further reduced to classic rock, which largely treated the songs that had become audience favorites during the medium's less controlled era as an oldies playlist and largely avoided work by any newer artists.

== See also ==
- 1964 in radio
- 1964 in the United States
- Regulation of radio broadcast in the United States
