= WOLG =

Radio station in Carlinville, Illinois

Coordinates: 39°14′25″N 89°54′27″W

- Carlinville, Illinois; United States
- Frequency: 95.9 MHz
- Branding: Covenant Network

Programming
- Format: Catholic talk radio

Ownership
- Owner: Covenant Network

History
- First air date: December 8, 1990 (as WCNL)
- Former call signs: WCNL (1990–1998)

Technical information
- Licensing authority: FCC
- Facility ID: 8882
- Class: A
- ERP: 6,000 watts
- HAAT: 99 meters (325 ft)

Links
- Public license information: Public file; LMS
- Website: ourcatholicradio.org

WOLG is an FM radio station at 95.9 MHz in Carlinville, Illinois, owned and operated by the Covenant Network of Catholic radio stations.

== History ==
WCNL went on the air December 8, 1990. Owned by the Carlinville Broadcasting Company, a subsidiary of Miller Media Group, the station aired a country format.

Covenant Network acquired WCNL and WTIM in Taylorville in 1998, with the FM station going for $300,000. WOLG and WIHM, the former WTIM, began simulcasting programming. WOLG was the first FM radio station owned by Covenant Network.

== Translators ==
WOLG is the nominal source of Covenant programming to nine translators, the most of any full-power station in the network.

Call sign	Frequency	City of license	State	FCC info
W202CJ	88.3 FM	Springfield	Illinois	FCC (W202CJ)
W213CD	90.5 FM	Vincennes	Indiana	FCC (W213CD)
K216GM	91.1 FM	Canton	Missouri	FCC (K216GM)
K219CX	91.7 FM	Atoka	Oklahoma	FCC (K219CX)
W220EN	91.9 FM	Carlyle	Illinois	FCC (W220EN)
W241CC	96.1 FM	Williamsville	Illinois	FCC (W241CC)
W246BL	97.1 FM	Salem	Illinois	FCC (W246BL)
W265CW	100.9 FM	Centralia	Illinois	FCC (W265CW)
W285EX	104.9 FM	Springfield	Illinois	FCC (W285EX)
