= WSHY (disambiguation) =

WSHY is a radio station (1410 AM) licensed to Lafayette, Indiana.

WSHY may also refer to:

- WEJT, a radio station (105.1 FM) licensed to Shelbyville, Illinois, which held the call sign WSHY from 1969 to 1989
- WTIM, a radio station (870 AM) licensed to Assumption, Illinois, which held the call sign WSHY from 1972 to 1998
- WRDF, a radio station (106.3 FM) licensed to Columbia City, Indiana, which held the call sign WSHY from 2005 to 2007
