= Perry Stone (disc jockey) =

- Occupations: Disc jockey, radio show host, shock jock

Perry Stone is an American disc jockey, radio show host and shock jock.

== Early career controversy ==
In October 1987, while working at Milwaukee radio station WQFM, Perry Stone was one of two disc jockeys, along with Randi Rhodes, who were suspended after their morning program offended members of Milwaukee's gay community, leading a number of prominent businesses to cancel advertisements per WQFM's general manager, Ralph Barnes. Stone and Rhodes' radio program was the target of roughly 1,000 flyers distributed in taverns by gay activists that accused the hosts of using antigay terminology on the air.

One of Stone's radio show comedy routines was to summon the severed head of actor Vic Morrow who died in the infamous Twilight Zone helicopter accident during the filming of Twilight Zone: The Movie. Morrow, portrayed by Perry, would then comment on current events.

=== KSJO controversy ===
In 1989, Stone was fired from San Jose, California radio station KSJO after verbal harassment of two Brownies, telling one 9-year-old to keep Girl Scout Cookie money, on his March 10, 1989 show, it cost him a suspension.

A second incident on the same day, involving a teenage girl that wrote a letter to Stone, may have been more serious, KSJO attorney Michael Hurley said at a news conference. The girl's angry mother wrote a letter to station manager David Baronfeld and demanded a retraction. Stone returned to KSJO to record the retraction and the broadcast was the last time Stone was heard on the station.

Prior to the incident, minority groups had called Stone racist, antisemitic and homophobic.

The NAACP and the Gay & Lesbian Alliance Against Defamation joined the Jewish Community Relations Council by filing an FCC complaint against Stone and KSJO.

Stone's KSJO on-air radio co-host during the controversy was Trish Bell. After Stone's firing, Bell remained on suspension without pay.

=== KITS era ===
In 1989, 30-year old Stone was hired for a new radio show at KITS FM radio station in Northern California, Stone replaced long time and recently fired radio personality Alex Bennett.

Upon learning of Stone's new KITS show the Jewish Community Relations Council publicly stated that they would be monitoring for any prejudicial overtones in his new radio program. Rabbi Dough Khan, executive director of JCRC, said that they felt their successful effort of getting Stone fired from KSJO would be the last time they would ever hear about him.

Though Stone claimed to have turned over a new leaf, Khan remained concerned about the bigotry of Stone's past on air remarks.

KITS issued a statement referring to their new disc jockey as a kindler, gentler Perry Stone. Stone gave a telephone interview to the Jewish Bulletin saying his new radio show was nothing like his old one. While not Jewish himself, after divorcing both Stone's parents remarried into the Jewish faith.

Stone claimed his new radio program would have no antisemitism, sayhing while some bits would be controversial they would not be anything that could not be seen on Late Night with David Letterman or The Tonight Show Starring Johnny Carson.

=== Later career ===
In 1997, while working at WROX-FM (96.1) in Norfolk, Virginia, Perry Stone and radio show co-host Henry “The Bull” Del Toro were defendants in a lawsuit filed by WNOR FM (98.7) radio show host Tommy Griffiths who alleged that between August and December 1995 Stone and Del Toro implied numerous times on the radio that Griffiths had used cocaine.

Griffiths ultimately won the lawsuit and the defendants agreed to pay Griffiths $80,000 to settle the lawsuit. WROX-FM also agreed to broadcast a statement saying Stone and Del Toro's comments about Griffiths were meant to be humorous.

In 2018, Stone was hired as the new Operations Manager for WMAY and WQLZ in Springfield, Illinois. Stone was also hired as an afternoon radio host on WQLZ. Prior to the Springfield hiring, Stone was the Operations Manager in North and South Carolina for Cumulus Radio.

In 2023, Stone released his autobiography Radio Daze: My Personal Journey through Life and the Radio Industry.
