= WTTT =

WTTT may refer to:

- WTTT (FM), a radio station (88.9 FM) licensed to serve Springfield, Illinois, United States
- WTTT (New Hampshire), a defunct radio station (98.7 FM) formerly licensed to serve Stratford, New Hampshire, United States
- WNYM, a radio station (970 AM) licensed to serve Hackensack, New Jersey, United States, which held the call sign WTTT in 2008
- WWDJ, a radio station (1150 AM) licensed to serve Boston, Massachusetts, United States, which held the call sign WTTT from 2003 to 2008
