= KADY (Missouri) =

Radio station in St. Charles, Missouri (1958–1965)

- St. Charles, Missouri; United States
- Broadcast area: Greater St. Louis
- Frequency: 1460 kHz

Ownership
- Owner: KADY, Inc.
- Sister stations: KADI

History
- First air date: April 3, 1958
- Last air date: January 20, 1965
- Call sign meaning: "William R. Cady, Jr."

Technical information
- Power: 5,000 watts (daytime only)

KADY was a commercial daytime-only radio station that was licensed to St. Charles, Missouri, and served Greater St. Louis. It broadcast on 1460 AM from April 3, 1958, to January 20, 1965.

== History ==
KADY signed on at 1 p.m. on April 3, 1958. The station broadcast with 5,000 watts during the day from a tower along State Highway 94 in Boschertown. Within three months of signing on, William R. Cady, Jr., an advertising executive, bought out majority shareholder Harman Moseley. The remaining shares were owned by Jack Chenoweth, the chief engineer at KETC television, and the Schnatmeier family.

KADY quickly expanded to FM. In May 1959, it filed an application with the Federal Communications Commission to build a new FM radio station in St. Louis. KADI 96.5 hit the air on December 22, duplicating KADY's programming and broadcasting after sunset; in 1964, it duplicated 63 percent of the AM outlet's programming. The combination of KADY and KADI promoted itself as "The KADY Twins" and used a cicada-themed logo. While the stations' programming consisted mostly of fine music, KADY-KADI snared the rights to broadcast Missouri Tigers football games in 1961.

In November 1962, the sale of KADY-KADI to KADY, Inc., headed by former Filmways president Rodney Erickson, was announced. Little changed in operations until February 14, 1964, when the station left the air at 11:30 a.m. as eight employees walked out in a pay dispute. The employees, including four engineers, claimed they had not been paid in two weeks and paychecks were being issued late. KADY-KADI, however, returned to the air on February 24, after 10 days of silence. By that summer, KADY-KADI had become affiliated with the Mutual Broadcasting System.

Yet again, it was unpaid engineers who started the second—and final—strike in KADY history. The station did not sign on as usual on January 21, 1965; the local representative of the International Brotherhood of Electrical Workers said that three IBEW engineers had not been paid for a month, and acting manager Homer Griffith shut the station down at the orders of ownership in New York. The next day, Griffith announced that KADY would remain off the air pending a "financial reorganization". KADI was sold in August 1965 to Vanguard Broadcasting Corporation, which would return it to the air.

In November 1965, Michael Rice of Webster Groves filed an application to build a new radio station on the 1460 frequency in St. Charles. KADY still faced legal troubles: the FCC fined the station in February 1966 for failure to illuminate its tower—the first such fine the commission had ever issued—over the objections of the licensee, which claimed it was insolvent. The AM outlet was never sold; the FCC granted the Rice application in November 1967 and KIRL began operating from the former KADY site at Boschertown in the summer of 1968.

The license for KADY was deleted on March 24, 1967.
