= WRMS (AM) =

Radio station in Beardstown, Illinois

- Beardstown, Illinois; United States
- Frequency: 790 kHz

Ownership
- Owner: Covenant Network

Technical information
- Licensing authority: FCC
- Facility ID: 13649
- Class: D
- Power: 500 watts day 55 watts night
- Transmitter coordinates: 40°0′11″N 90°23′51″W
- Translators: W221BX (92.1 MHz, Pittsfield)

Links
- Public license information: Public file; LMS
- Website: ourcatholicradio.org/station/beardstown-il-night

WRMS (790 AM) is a radio station licensed to Beardstown, Illinois, United States. The station is currently owned by Covenant Network.
