= Sherman-Williamsville Trail =

Right of way in Illinois

The Sherman-Williamsville Trail is a 4.5-mile (7.2 km) right-of-way that has been set aside for future use as a rail trail from Sherman, Illinois to Williamsville, Illinois in Fancy Creek Township and Williams Township in northern Sangamon County.

The southwest end of the trail in Sherman is along East Andrew Road between Bahr Road and Pine Drive (39°53′45.6″N 89°35′37.0″W). The northeast end of the trail in Williamsville is on Conrey Street east of Elm Street (39°57′2.8″N 89°33′7.9″W).

The right-of-way occupies part of what was once an electric interurban line operated by the Illinois Terminal Railroad (ITR) from 1906 until 1956. The right-of-way, which generally parallels Interstate 55, has passed into the hands of the electrical utility holding company Ameren, the current owner, and is used as a high-tension power corridor.

Construction and operation of the proposed rail trail was carried out by the village of Williamsville. The trail was officially open as of November 20, 2021.

== Current events ==
On 6 December 2010, the Sherman-Williamsville rail-trail project received a $269,000 state/federal grant for engineering planning purposes. The money will be used to survey the route and do test borings to determine if the ITR's railroad ballast remains in place underneath the land surface of the overgrown right-of-way. The total cost of the Sherman-Williamsville trail project was estimated in December 2010 at $2.38 million.

On 27 May 2011, Williamsville announced that engineering and design work, to be carried out under the December 2010 grant, would start in summer 2011.

In 2016 The project was awarded $2,000,000 for construction
