= XEYC-AM =

Radio station in Ciudad Juárez, Chihuahua, Mexico

- Ciudad Juárez, Chihuahua; Mexico
- Frequency: 1460 AM
- Branding: Radio Fórmula

Programming
- Format: Talk radio

Ownership
- Owner: Grupo Fórmula; (Transmisora Regional Radio Fórmula, S.A. de C.V.)

History
- First air date: February 25, 1949
- Former frequencies: 1030 AM
- Call sign meaning: Original owner Ysela Caballero

Technical information
- Licensing authority: CRT
- Class: C
- Power: 1 kW

Links
- Webcast: Listen live
- Website: radioformula.com.mx

XEYC-AM is a radio station on 1460 AM in Ciudad Juárez, Chihuahua, Mexico, part of the Radio Fórmula talk radio network.

== History ==
XEYC logo until 2018 on 1030 AM

XEYC received its first concession on February 25, 1949. It operated on 1460 kHz with 1,000 watts and was owned by and named for Ysela Fernández Caballero de Yañez. The station was known as "Radio Ysela". Fernández Caballero died on June 21, 1972.

XEYC was sold to XEYC, S.A., in 1980. In 1998, the concession was sold directly to Fórmula in the person of Rogerio Azcárraga Madero. The 1999 concession listed XEYC on 1030 kHz with 5,000 watts day and 500 watts night. The 2009 concession lists 1460 kHz as the frequency, but promotional materials mentioned 1030 AM until XEYC returned to 1460 on May 27, 2018.
