= KHOJ (AM) =

Radio station in St. Charles, Missouri

Coordinates: 38°50′05″N 90°28′07″W

- St. Charles, Missouri; United States
- Broadcast area: Greater St. Louis
- Frequency: 1460 kHz

Programming
- Format: Catholic
- Affiliations: EWTN Radio

Ownership
- Owner: Covenant Network
- Sister stations: WRYT

History
- First air date: 1968
- Former call signs: KIRL (1968–2005)
- Call sign meaning: Heart of Jesus

Technical information
- Licensing authority: FCC
- Facility ID: 7114
- Class: B
- Power: 12,000 watts (day); 210 watts (night)
- Translators: 96.7 K244FO (Crestwood); 102.9 K275CI (St. Charles)

Links
- Public license information: Public file; LMS
- Webcast: Listen Live
- Website: covenantnet.net

KHOJ (1460 AM) is an radio station licensed to St. Charles, Missouri, and serving the Greater St. Louis area. It is owned by the Covenant Network and broadcasts a Catholic radio format. Some programming comes from the EWTN Radio Network. The studios are on Hampton Avenue in St. Louis.

By day, KHOJ is powered at 12,000 watts. But to avoid interference to other stations on 1460 AM, at night power is greatly reduced to 210 watts. The AM transmitter is located north of St. Charles. Programming is also heard on two FM translators: 96.7 K244FO in Crestwood and 102.9 K275CI in St. Charles.

== History ==
The station debuted, as KIRL, in 1968. It replaced KADY, which had previously operated on the frequency from 1958 to 1965, and had been deleted on March 24, 1967. KIRL operated from the transmitter site previously used by KADY.

KIRL was owned by Contemporary Media, Inc. In 1979, Contemporary Media sold the station to the Bronco Broadcasting Company. Bronco relaunched KIRL as a gospel music station for the African American community. Zella Jackson Price and other pioneering announcers were on its air staff.

In 2005, Bronco sold KIRL to the Covenant Network for $730,000. The sale marked the end of KIRL's gospel programming as of April 30 and scattered many of the religious programs it carried. Covenant immediately relaunched the station as KHOJ with its programming.
