= WMKR =

Coordinates: 39°27′08″N 89°17′10″W

- Pana, Illinois; United States
- Broadcast area: Taylorville, Illinois
- Frequency: 94.3 MHz (HD Radio)
- Branding: Genuine Country 94.3 WMKR

Programming
- Format: Country
- Subchannels: HD1: WMKR analog HD2: Country "New Country 104.1"; HD3: Soft oldies "96.5 The Chill"; HD4: Same as HD2

Ownership
- Owner: Miller Communications, Inc.
- Sister stations: WRAN

History
- First air date: July 12, 1996

Technical information
- Licensing authority: FCC
- Facility ID: 42646
- Class: A
- ERP: 5,600 watts
- HAAT: 104 meters (341 ft)
- Translators: HD2: 104.1 W281BO (Taylorville); HD3: 96.5 W243DN (Taylorville)

Links
- Public license information: Public file; LMS
- Webcast: Listen Live (HD3)
- Website: WMKR Online

WMKR (94.3 FM; "Genuine Country 94.3") is a radio station broadcasting a country music format, licensed to Pana, Illinois, United States. The station serves the Taylorville, Illinois area. WMKR is owned by Miller Communications, Inc.

WMKR'S original city of license was Taylorville, but was changed to Pana when WXKO-FM (100.9 FM, now WZUS) in Pana was sold to a new owner and the frequency was moved to Macon, Illinois.

== HD Radio ==
On December 26, 2018, WMKR's HD3 subchannel changed its format from soft adult contemporary to oldies, branded as "Cruisin' 96.5" (simulcast on translator W243DN Taylorville).

On January 1, 2021, WMKR-HD3 changed its format from oldies to sports, branded as "96.5 The Winner".

On July 25, 2022, It was announced that WMKR-HD3 will change their format from sports to soft oldies/soft adult contemporary on August 1, branded as "96.5 The Chill".
