= WEMK =

- West Allis, Wisconsin; United States
- Broadcast area: Greater Milwaukee
- Frequency: 1460 kHz
- Branding: 102.5 The Family

Programming
- Format: Christian contemporary music

Ownership
- Owner: The Family Radio Network, Inc.

History
- First air date: June 4, 1950; 76 years ago (as WRAC)
- Former call signs: WRAC (1950–1975); WRKR (1975–1979); WWEG (1979–1983); WRKR (1983–1987); WBZN (1987–1991); WKKV (1991–1993); WBJX (1993–2007); WJTI (2007–2024)
- Call sign meaning: Evangel Ministries of Milwaukee

Technical information
- Licensing authority: FCC
- Facility ID: 68759
- Class: B
- Power: 1,000 watts day; 240 watts night
- Transmitter coordinates: 43°0′32.05″N 88°2′6.32″W
- Repeater: 102.5 W273DQ (Milwaukee)

Links
- Public license information: Public file; LMS
- Webcast: Listen live
- Website: thefamily.net/Milwaukee/

WEMK (1460 AM) is a commercial radio station licensed to West Allis, Wisconsin, and serving the Greater Milwaukee radio market. Owned by Evangel Ministries under its subsidiary The Family Radio Network, Inc, the station carries Christian contemporary music as part of a statewide network of stations.

By day, WEMK is powered at 1,000 watts. But to protect other stations on 1460 AM from interference, it reduces power at night to 240 watts. Programming is also heard on FM translator W273DQ at 102.5 MHz.

== History ==
The station signed on the air on June 4, 1950, as WRAC in Racine. The owner of the station purchased another Racine station, WRJN-FM in 1969, changing it to WRAC-FM. A year later, the FM station flipped to a rock-leaning top 40 format as WRKR, and in 1975, WRAC adopted that call sign, simulcasting WRAC-FM. It was also for a brief time WWEG ("The Country Egg") before returning to WRKR and again simulcasting the FM signal. Later, there was a short lived Spanish format.

The station switched calls to WBZN on October 14, 1987, simulcasting its sister station’s new smooth jazz format. Both stations flipped to urban contemporary in June 1991, becoming WKKV. The AM station broke away from the simulcast in November 1993, flipping to a Spanish-language format as WBJX. In 2007, the station moved to the Milwaukee suburb of West Allis and changed its call sign to WJTI.

On December 17, 2021, WJTI began stunting with Christmas music and launched a simulcast on new translator W273DQ (102.5 FM). The previous Regional Mexican format continues through former translator 97.9 W250BN, which is now fed via the HD3 sub-channel of WMYX-FM. On December 26, 2021, WJTI and W273BQ flipped to a smooth jazz format as "102.5 FM".

== Translators ==
Call sign	Frequency	City of license	FID	ERP (W)	Transmitter coordinates	FCC info
W273DQ	102.5 FM	Milwaukee, Wisconsin	202887	99	43°2′18.5″N 87°54′8.4″W	LMS

The sale of translator station W250BN to El Sol was completed in May 2014, with El Sol beginning to simulcast WJTI upon it over that month's Memorial Day weekend. Previously the station had independently been a translator of Wisconsin Public Radio's Ideas Network via WHAD (90.7) under the ownership of "Radio Power, Inc.", which moved the translator over the years up the Rock Freeway corridor from Beloit in an attempt to move it to Milwaukee in order to likely present a ready-made signal for a commercial operation to broadcast an HD Radio subchannel or AM signal over. The moves were questioned by the Federal Communications Commission, with a denial of a construction permit to the MPTV Tower in the Shorewood tower farm and an inquiry to Radio Power on their motives before the purchase by El Sol. Radio Power eventually was approved to transmit from the Hilton Milwaukee City Center tower in the downtown area, which is closer to the core Latino-American neighborhoods on Milwaukee's south side which WJTI serves than the Shorewood site. On December 17. 2021, WJTI signed on translator station 102.5 W273DQ, which serves the Milwaukee market.
