= WHOJ =

Radio station in Terre Haute, Indiana

- Terre Haute, Indiana; United States
- Broadcast area: Terre Haute
- Frequency: 91.9 MHz
- Branding: Heart of Jesus Radio

Programming
- Format: Christian radio
- Network: Covenant Network

Ownership
- Owner: Covenant Network

History
- First air date: 1997
- Former call signs: WAPC (1996–2004)
- Call sign meaning: Heart Of Jesus

Technical information
- Licensing authority: FCC
- Facility ID: 76151
- Class: A
- ERP: 963 watts
- HAAT: 29.0 meters
- Transmitter coordinates: 39°28′5.00″N 87°23′55.00″W
- Repeaters: 93.1 W226AZ (Martinsville, IL)

Links
- Public license information: Public file; LMS
- Website: covenantnet.net

WHOJ (91.9 FM) is a radio station broadcasting a Christian radio format. Licensed to Terre Haute, Indiana, United States, the station serves the Terre Haute area. The station is currently owned by Covenant Network.

== History ==
The station began broadcasting in 1997, and held the call sign WAPC. It was owned by American Family Association and was an affiliate of American Family Radio. In January 2004, the station was sold to IHR Educational Broadcasting. In March 2004, it was sold to Covenant Network, along with KBKC, for $112,500. On June 3, 2004, the station changed its call sign to the current WHOJ.

== Translators ==
In addition to the main station, WHOJ is relayed by an additional translator to widen its broadcast area.

Call sign	Frequency	City of license	FID	ERP (W)	Class	FCC info
W226AZ	93.1 FM	Martinsville, Illinois	144404	170	D	LMS
