= WRYT =

Radio station in Edwardsville, Illinois

- Edwardsville, Illinois; United States
- Broadcast area: Greater St. Louis
- Frequency: 1080 kHz

Programming
- Format: Catholic

Ownership
- Owner: Covenant Network
- Sister stations: KHOJ

History
- First air date: November 9, 1987
- Former call signs: WHRC (1987–1988)
- Call sign meaning: pronounced "rite", as in Catholic rites

Technical information
- Licensing authority: FCC
- Facility ID: 27556
- Class: D
- Power: 500 watts day; 380 watts critical hours; 20 watts night
- Translator: 92.7 W224DC (Caseyville)

Links
- Public license information: Public file; LMS
- Website: www.covenantnet.net

WRYT (1080 AM) is a radio station broadcasting out of Edwardsville, Illinois, with a Catholic format. It is part of the Covenant Network.

Because WRYT shares the same frequency as "clear channel" station KRLD in Dallas, the station broadcast during the daytime hours only until April 9, 2014.

WRYT's studios are located on Hampton Avenue in St. Louis, while its transmitter is located near Edwardsville.

== History ==
WRYT went on the air November 9, 1987, but while the station promoted itself as WRYT in local media, its call sign was legally WHRC (standing for original owners Horizon Radio Corporation) until February 4, 1988, when it exchanged call letters with TV channel 46 in Norwell, Massachusetts, which founder Bob Howe also owned. As a commercial station, WRYT broadcast adult standards music and news programming aimed at listeners in Edwardsville and Madison County, Illinois.

The station was sold in 1992 to the Hometown Broadcasting Company, owned by Tom Lauher, of Creve Coeur, Missouri. Five years later, he sold the station to Covenant founder Tony Holman, whom he found "more serious and interested and less on a fishing expedition". Covenant Network began operating WRYT, its first station on May 1, 1997.

== Translator ==
Call sign	Frequency	City of license	FID	ERP (W)	Class	Transmitter coordinates	FCC info
W224DC	105.3 FM	Caseyville, Illinois	156900	250	D	38°37′47″N 90°0′40″W	LMS
