= WYMG =

Radio station in Chatham, Illinois

- Chatham, Illinois; United States
- Broadcast area: Springfield metropolitan area
- Frequency: 100.5 MHz
- Branding: 100.5 WYMG

Programming
- Format: Classic rock

Ownership
- Owner: Saga Communications; (Saga Communications of Illinois, LLC)
- Sister stations: WDBR; WLFZ; WTAX-FM; WTAX

History
- First air date: March 1948
- Former call signs: WEAI (1948–1985)

Technical information
- Licensing authority: FCC
- Facility ID: 58537
- Class: B
- ERP: 50,000 watts
- HAAT: 149 meters (489 ft)
- Transmitter coordinates: 39°39′40″N 89°55′18″W

Links
- Public license information: Public file; LMS
- Webcast: Listen live
- Website: www.wymg.com

WYMG (100.5 FM) is a commercial radio station licensed to Chatham, Illinois, United States, and serving the Springfield metropolitan area. The station is owned by Saga Communications, and operates as part of its Capitol Radio Group and airs a classic rock format.

WYMG's transmitter is sited off of County Road 15 West in Loami, Illinois.

== History ==
In March 1948, the station first signed on the air. Its call sign was WEAI and its original city of license was Jacksonville, Illinois. It was the FM counterpart to WLDS 1180 AM and largely simulcast that station in its early years. For most of the 1970s and 80s, it had a separate automated format, playing Adult Top 40 hits.

The station has been assigned the call letters WYMG by the Federal Communications Commission since May 1, 1985.
