= WCKW =

Radio station in Garyville, Louisiana

Garyville, Louisiana; United States
- Broadcast area: River Parishes
- Frequency: 1010 kHz

Programming
- Language: English
- Format: Catholic

Ownership
- Owner: Covenant Network

History
- First air date: December 2, 1970
- Former call signs: WKQT (1970–1985); WCKW (1985–2000); WLTS (2000)

Technical information
- Licensing authority: FCC
- Facility ID: 115
- Class: D
- Power: 500 watts (day); 42 watts (night)
- Transmitter coordinates: 30°04′35″N 90°37′17″W
- Translators: W230CL (93.9 MHz, Garyville)

Links
- Public license information: Public file; LMS

WCKW (1010 AM) is an American radio station licensed to serve the community of Garyville, Louisiana, United States. The station is owned by Covenant Network.

== Programming ==
WCKW broadcasts a Catholic radio format to the greater New Orleans area, most notably the River Parishes of St. John the Baptist, St. Charles, and St. James.

== History ==
The station signed on in December 1970 as country music outlet WKQT, the sister station of WCKW-FM. These stations were founded by Sidney Joseph Levet III, a New Orleans native and an electronic engineer. In February 1990, Levet was named Broadcaster of the Year by the Louisiana Association of Broadcasters. (Levet died in 1997.)

By 1973, both stations became simulcasts with the AM becoming WCKW on March 2, 1985. After the FM flipped to active rock, the AM was sold in 2000 to River Parishes Radio, who switched it to a gospel format. The station briefly became "WLTS" on October 20, 2000, but the station was reassigned the call sign "WCKW" by the Federal Communications Commission (FCC) on November 24, 2000. Covenant Network purchased the station on January 2, 2007 and began transmitting its Catholic programming.
