= WTAX-FM =

Radio station in Sherman, Illinois

Simulcasts WTAX, Springfield
- Sherman, Illinois; United States
- Broadcast area: Springfield metropolitan area
- Frequency: 93.9 MHz
- Branding: NewsRadio WTAX

Programming
- Format: Talk radio
- Affiliations: ABC News Radio; NBC News Radio; Compass Media Networks; Premiere Networks; Salem Radio Network; Westwood One

Ownership
- Owner: Saga Communications; (Saga Communications of Illinois, LLC)
- Sister stations: WDBR; WLFZ; WTAX; WYMG

History
- First air date: September 1, 1971
- Former call signs: WPRC-FM (1971–1981); WLRX (1981–1986); WESZ (1986–1994); WWTE (1994–1996); WYXY (1996–2001); WMHX (2001–2005); WABZ (2005–2013); WQQL (2013–2021)
- Call sign meaning: Taken from WTAX

Technical information
- Licensing authority: FCC
- Facility ID: 9964
- Class: B1
- ERP: 15,000 watts
- HAAT: 131 meters (430 ft)
- Transmitter coordinates: 39°59′25.00″N 89°30′46.00″W

Links
- Public license information: Public file; LMS
- Webcast: Listen live
- Website: wtax.com

WTAX-FM (93.9 MHz) is a commercial radio station licensed to Sherman, Illinois, United States, and serving the Springfield metropolitan area. Owned by Saga Communications, it features a talk format in a full-time simulcast with WTAX (1240 AM). Studios are located on East Sangamon Avenue in Springfield and the transmitter is on 450th Avenue at Interstate 55 in Mount Fulcher, Illinois.

== History ==
The station signed on as WPRC-FM on September 1, 1947. The station changed its call sign to WLRX on May 3, 1981. On June 1, 1986, the call sign was changed to WESZ. On November 15, 1994, it was changed to WWTE, and on September 16, 1996, to WYXY. From February 19, 2001, to April 7, 2005, the station aired a hot adult contemporary format as WMHX, "Mix 93.9". On April 8, 2005, the station flipped to adult hits as "93.9 ABE FM" and adopted the callsign WABZ.

On October 2, 2013, the WQQL call sign was moved from 101.9 to 93.9, and the format was changed to classic hits as "Cool 93.9". On the same day, "ABE FM" was moved to FM translator 101.1 W266BZ (which is currently also aired on WDBR's HD2 subchannel as classic country "101.1 The Outlaw").

On May 28, 2021, WQQL announced that the classic hits format would move to translator 93.5 W288DL on June 7; at that time, WQQL assumed the translator's previous format, a simulcast of AM station WTAX. The move would end the use of the "Cool" branding in Springfield, as the station would rebrand as "Rewind 93.5" with the move; the name had been used, originally on 101.9, since 1993. The move is also believed to be an answer to a previous move with WMAY, having a simulcast on WMAY-FM added the previous September, giving WTAX a similar option on FM radio. Concurrent with the move, 93.9 changed its call letters to WTAX-FM to match its new simulcast partner.

== Programming ==
Joey McLaughlin hosts the morning drive program on WTAX-FM, with the rest of the weekday schedule devoted to syndicated talk shows.
