= WZEP =

- DeFuniak Springs, Florida; United States
- Broadcast area: Ft. Walton Beach area
- Frequency: 1460 kHz

Programming
- Format: Variety
- Affiliations: Salem Radio

Ownership
- Owner: Tom Fleetwood; (Fleetwood Communications, Inc.)

History
- First air date: 1955
- Former call signs: WFNM (1956–1959); WZEP (1959–1984); WPAF (1984–1985)

Technical information
- Licensing authority: FCC
- Facility ID: 70821
- Class: D
- Power: 10,000 watts day 186 watts night
- Transmitter coordinates: 30°43′45.00″N 86°7′4.00″W

Links
- Public license information: Public file; LMS
- Website: wzep1460.com

WZEP (1460 AM) is a radio station broadcasting a Variety format. Licensed to DeFuniak Springs, Florida, United States, the station serves the Ft. Walton Beach area. The station is currently owned by Tom Fleetwood, through licensee Fleetwood Communications, Inc., and features programming from Florida Network News and CBS Radio.

== History ==
According to a recorded interview with H. Byrd Mapoles on the WZEP website, the station was built in 1955 by Mapoles' father, Milton newspaperman and broadcaster Clayton Mapoles (who, after selling WZEP, built a station in Milton using the same basic building specs). The original call letters, WFNM, signified the initials of Clayton Mapoles' daughter, Frances Nelda Mapoles. As noted in the 1960 Broadcasting Yearbook, the change to the current WZEP coincided with the 1959 purchase of the station by Dr. Leonard S. Zepp. For a period of about 11 months, beginning in March 1984, the station's call-sign was changed to WPAF, reverting to WZEP in February, 1985, as referenced in the station's FCC call-letter file. WZEP was the first radio station licensed in DeFuniak Springs, Walton County. Prior to 1955, a radio station from Crestview held remote broadcasts near Lake DeFuniak. In 2003 WZEP increased its power from 5,000 watts to 10,000 watts daytime.

Former logo
