= WLFZ =

Radio station in Springfield, Illinois

Coordinates: 39.711°N 89.645°W

- Springfield, Illinois; United States
- Broadcast area: Central Illinois
- Frequency: 101.9 MHz
- Branding: 101.9 The Wolf

Programming
- Format: Country
- Affiliations: Westwood One

Ownership
- Owner: Saga Communications
- Sister stations: WDBR; WTAX; WTAX-FM; WYMG

History
- First air date: September 1, 1965
- Former call signs: WVEM (1965–1993); WQQL (1993–2013)
- Call sign meaning: "Wolf"

Technical information
- Licensing authority: FCC
- Facility ID: 58549
- Class: B
- ERP: 50,000 watts
- HAAT: 83 meters (272 ft)

Links
- Public license information: Public file; LMS
- Webcast: Listen live
- Website: capitolwolf.com

WLFZ (101.9 FM) is a commercial radio station licensed to Springfield, Illinois, United States, and serving Central Illinois. It is owned by Saga Communications, operating as part of its Capitol Radio Group, and has a country music format. Studios are located on East Sangamon Avenue in Springfield.

WLFZ's transmitter is sited on Canadian Cross Road in Springfield, near Exit 90 of Interstate 55.

== History ==
On September 1, 1965, the station first signed on the air. Its original call sign was WVEM and it broadcast a middle of the road music format that was mostly automated.

In 1993, it was purchased by Saga Communications, which switched the call letters to WQQL. It aired an oldies format as "Cool 101.9". It continued with its oldies sound for the next two decades.

Saga Communications changed the format to country music and the call letters to WLFZ on October 2, 2013. The 101.9 frequency's WQQL call letters were moved to 93.9 and the format was, in the process, changed to classic hits as "Cool 93.9". Concurrently, the adult hits format of the 93.9 signal, "93.9 ABE FM", was moved to translator 101.1 FM (W266BZ-FM at 250 Watts), which is now known as classic country "101.1 The Outlaw." It also broadcasts on WDBR-HD2 featuring the same format and branding. WLFZ's has one country competitor in the Springfield market, 104.5 WFMB-FM, owned by Neuhoff Media.
