= WXRQ =

Radio station in Mount Pleasant, Tennessee

- Mount Pleasant, Tennessee; United States
- Frequency: 1460 kHz
- Branding: The Power Gospel

Programming
- Format: Southern Gospel
- Affiliations: GNC Radio Network

Ownership
- Owner: Greg Combs; (Greg Combs Providential Broadcasting, LLC)

Technical information
- Licensing authority: FCC
- Facility ID: 48497
- Class: D
- Power: 600 watts day 170 watts night
- Transmitter coordinates: 35°31′21.00″N 87°11′34.00″W

Links
- Public license information: Public file; LMS

WXRQ (1460 AM, "The Power Gospel") is a radio station broadcasting a Southern Gospel music format. Licensed to Mount Pleasant, Tennessee, United States, the station is currently owned by Greg Combs Providential Broadcasting, LLC, and features programming from GNC Radio Network.
