= WBCU =

- Union, South Carolina; United States
- Frequency: 1460 kHz
- Branding: AM 1460 WBCU

Programming
- Format: Country music
- Affiliations: ABC Radio, Jones Radio Network

Ownership
- Owner: Union-Carolina Broadcasting Company, Inc.

History
- First air date: 1949

Technical information
- Licensing authority: FCC
- Facility ID: 7088
- Class: D
- Power: 1,000 watts day 106 watts night
- Transmitter coordinates: 34°43′10″N 81°39′44″W
- Translator: 103.5 W278BE (Union)

Links
- Public license information: Public file; LMS
- Webcast: Listen Live
- Website: wbcuradio.com

WBCU (1460 AM) is a radio station broadcasting a country music format to the Union, South Carolina, United States, area. The station is currently owned by Union-Carolina Broadcasting Company, Inc., and features programming from Westwood One News and Westwood One 24-hour formats, as well as South Carolina Radio Network and the syndicated Clark Howard Show.

According to the station's website, WBCU also provides local news, sports, weather and community events. The station broadcasts the entire football, baseball and basketball schedule of Union County High School, the University of South Carolina and Clemson University football and basketball games and the Atlanta Braves baseball games.

The transmitter and antenna system are located west of Union on Rice Avenue. It uses a single tower full-time for an omnidirectional signal pattern. It uses 1,000 watts during the day and drops to 106 watts at night.

Former logo

An FM translator came online in February 2008. Its official call sign is W278BE, broadcasting on 103.5 FM.

On October 31, 2014, WBCU began streaming its signal online. It also released Android and iPhone apps for mobile access to the stream.
