= WTTT (FM) =

Coordinates: 39.734°N 89.638°W

- Springfield, Illinois, U.S.; United States
- Frequency: 88.9 MHz
- Branding: Covenant Network

Programming
- Format: Catholic radio

Ownership
- Owner: Covenant Network

History
- Former call signs: WQNA (1980–2020)
- Former frequencies: 88.3 MHz (1980–2020)

Technical information
- Licensing authority: FCC
- Class: A
- ERP: 250 watts
- HAAT: 78 meters (256 ft)

Links
- Public license information: Public file; LMS
- Webcast: Listen Live
- Website: http://ourcatholicradio.org/

WTTT is a radio station in Springfield, Illinois, broadcasting at 88.9 FM.

== History ==
=== Capital Area Career Center ===
For its first 39 years of existence, WTTT was owned by the Capital Area Career Center and formed part of its Digital Radio/TV program, under the call sign WQNA, and broadcasting on 88.3.

WQNA was granted its first license on March 5, 1980, run by students and broadcasting at 10 watts at 88.3 MHz. In 1998, the station went 24 hours with volunteers and automation, at 3,000 watts, but only a 90-foot (27 m) tower. WQNA was one of the first radio stations in the country to stream live on the Internet. The station upgraded to a taller 270-foot (82 m) tower at 250 watts in 2002.

=== Sale to Covenant Network ===
In August 2019, Capital Area Career Center put the station up for sale due to lack of student interest. Until a buyer was found, WQNA would continue to operate with a volunteer staff. Three months later, Capital Area Career Center approved the sale of the station for $47,000 to the Catholic Covenant Network, whose presence in Springfield had previously been limited to a pair of translators. WQNA immediately went silent as a result. The volunteer DJs at WQNA are attempting to raise funds to purchase another station. In the meantime, they are still broadcasting online as webradio station SCB WQNA-DB.

The sale to Covenant Network was consummated on April 8, 2020. The station changed its call sign to WTTT the following day. However, Covenant then swapped the facilities of WTTT and W205BG, its previous translator in downtown Springfield, resulting in a full-service license on 88.9 MHz and a translator on 88.3, which remains silent.

== Previous logo ==
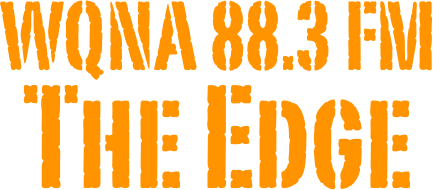
