= Boschertown, Missouri =

Unincorporated community in Missouri

Coordinates: 38°50′00″N 90°28′12″W

Boschertown is an unincorporated community in St. Charles County, in the U.S. state of Missouri.

== History ==
A post office called Boschertown was established in 1879, and remained in operation until 1881. The community has the name of John Boscher, a pioneer citizen.
