= WLRP =

Radio station in San Sebastián, Puerto Rico

- San Sebastián, Puerto Rico; Puerto Rico
- Frequency: 1460 kHz
- Branding: Radio Raíces 1460 AM

Programming
- Format: News Talk/Spanish Variety format
- Affiliations: Radio Isla

Ownership
- Owner: Las Raices Pepinianas, Inc.; (Radio Station WLRP, Inc.)

History
- First air date: January 6, 1965
- Former call signs: WFBA(1965-1982)
- Call sign meaning: Las Raices Pepinianas

Technical information
- Licensing authority: FCC
- Facility ID: 36637
- Class: B
- Power: 50,000 watts unlimited
- Transmitter coordinates: 18°20′50″N 66°59′56″W

Links
- Public license information: Public file; LMS
- Webcast: Listen Live
- Website: www.radioraices1460.com

WLRP (1460 AM, "Radio Raíces 1460 AM") is a radio station licensed to serve San Sebastián, Puerto Rico. The station is owned by Las Raíces Pepinianas, Inc. The station has been on the air since January 6, 1965. It airs news, talk shows, and music in a Spanish variety format. The station was assigned the WLRP call letters by the Federal Communications Commission on July 12, 1982.
