= WDBR =

Radio station in Springfield, Illinois

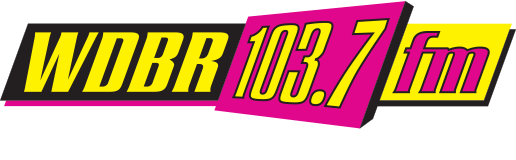
- Springfield, Illinois; United States
- Broadcast area: Central Illinois
- Frequency: 103.7 MHz (HD Radio)
- Branding: 103.7 WDBR

Programming
- Format: Contemporary hit radio
- Subchannels: HD2: 101.1 The Outlaw (Classic country); HD3: Pure Oldies 107.5 (Oldies); HD4: Rewind 93.5 (Classic hits)
- Affiliations: Premiere Networks; Westwood One

Ownership
- Owner: Saga Communications; (Saga Communications of Illinois, LLC)
- Sister stations: WLFZ; WTAX; WTAX-FM; WYMG

History
- First air date: April 1948
- Former call signs: WTAX-FM (1948–1972)

Technical information
- Licensing authority: FCC
- Facility ID: 9960
- Class: B
- ERP: 50,000 watts
- HAAT: 91 meters (299 ft)
- Transmitter coordinates: 39.794°N 89.605°W
- Translators: HD2: 101.1 W266BZ (Springfield); HD3: 107.5 W298AP (Springfield); HD4: 93.5 W228DL (Springfield)

Links
- Public license information: Public file; LMS
- Webcast: Listen live; Listen live (HD2); Listen live (HD3); Listen live (HD4)
- Website: wdbr.com; HD2: 1011theoutlaw.com; HD3: pureoldies1075.com; HD4: myrewind935.com

WDBR (103.7 FM) is a commercial radio station licensed to Springfield, Illinois, United States, and serving the Central Illinois region. Owned by Saga Communications as part of its Capitol Radio Group, it broadcasts a contemporary hit radio format. WDBR's transmitter is sited on South Dirksen Parkway (Illinois Route 29) near East Cook Street.

WDBR broadcasts in HD Radio: it has three digital subchannels, which in turn, feed three FM translators: classic country on HD2, oldies on HD3 and classic hits on HD4.

== History ==
In April 1948, the station signed on the air as WTAX-FM. It was Springfield's second FM station and the oldest continuously operating FM station in the market. (Currently, a station at 93.9 in Sherman, Illinois uses the WTAX-FM call sign. It is also owned by Saga Communications.)

In its early years, it largely simulcast its AM sister station, WTAX 1240 AM. But in the 1960s, it got a separate format: beautiful music. WTAX-FM played quarter hour sweeps of soft, instrumental cover versions of popular songs, Broadway and Hollywood show tunes. The station was largely automated.

In January 1972, WTAX-FM switched to Drake-Chenault's "Solid Gold" automated format, as WDBR. It was a mix of adult appeal Top 40 hits and rock Oldies. WDBR dropped "Solid Gold" in late 1973 and went to a locally programmed, voicetracked Top 40 sound, which proved successful in the ratings. During the 1970s and 1980s, WDBR was known by the moniker Music 104.

WDBR remained largely voicetracked until the early 1990s, when increased competition and faltering ratings forced the station, by then owned by Sentry Insurance, to go fully live, after which the station regained its position as a dominant force in Springfield Top 40 radio. The team included: Gregory Lawley, Lisa Crocker, and Patrick Gordon mornings, Bobby T. middays, Jim Moore Afternoons, and Rick Elliott nights with the original "Hot 9 at 9". Rick also hosted the "Dance Machine" on Fox TV affiliate WRSP-TV.

WDBR's tower (shared with sister station WTAX 1240 AM), in operation since 1949, was destroyed by a tornado during the severe weather outbreak of March 2006. The stations soon resumed broadcasting from a new tower at a new location.

=== HD Radio ===
On October 2, 2013, Adult Hits ABE FM was moved from 93.9 FM to WDBR-HD2 and also transmitted on 101.1 FM (W266BZ-FM) to create 101.1 ABE FM. On January 29, 2016, 101.1 ABE FM flipped to classic country as "101.1 The Outlaw".

Additional HD subchannels were added playing 1960s-70s oldies (Pure Oldies 107.5) and 1980s-90s classic hits (Rewind 93.5).
