= WIHM (AM) =

Catholic radio station in Taylorville, Illinois, United States

- Taylorville, Illinois; United States
- Frequency: 1410 kHz

Programming
- Format: Catholic
- Affiliations: EWTN Radio

Ownership
- Owner: Covenant Network

History
- First air date: 1952
- Former call signs: WTIM (1952–1998)
- Call sign meaning: Immaculate Heart of Mary

Technical information
- Licensing authority: FCC
- Facility ID: 42644
- Class: D
- Power: 1,000 watts day 63 watts night
- Transmitter coordinates: 39°32′38.00″N 89°16′30.00″W
- Translator: 102.9 MHz (W275CB - Mt. Vernon)

Links
- Public license information: Public file; LMS
- Website: ourcatholicradio.org/station/taylorville-il-day

WIHM (1410 AM) is a radio station broadcasting a Catholic format. Licensed to Taylorville, Illinois, United States, the station is currently owned by the Covenant Network. Programming of WIHM can also be heard on WOLG (95.9 FM) in Carlinville.

1410 AM was the original frequency of Taylorville's primary local station, WTIM, which broadcast at that frequency from its sign-on in 1952 until 1997 when it moved to 97.3 FM (now WRAN; WTIM is now heard on 870 AM). In 1998, 1410 was acquired by Covenant Network as its second station and received new WIHM call letters.
