= KCWM =

- Hondo, Texas; United States
- Frequency: 1460 kHz
- Branding: KCWM 1460

Programming
- Format: country music

Ownership
- Owner: Hondo Communications, Inc.

Technical information
- Licensing authority: FCC
- Facility ID: 21673
- Class: B
- Power: 500 watts day 226 watts night
- Transmitter coordinates: 29°21′42.00″N 99°7′42.00″W

Links
- Public license information: Public file; LMS
- Website: kcwm.net

KCWM (1460 AM) is a radio station licensed in Hondo, Texas, United States. The station is owned by Hondo Communications, Inc. The music format is "The World's Best Country" emphasizes traditional country music.

The station also broadcasts high school sports for Hondo, Medina Valley, and D'Hanis High Schools in Medina County, Texas as well as agricultural information on the Morning Report 6 to 6:30 a.m. and on the Midday Report at 12 noon.

THE MORNING REPORT – 6 to 6:30 a.m. Weather, agricultural news, market reports and feature programming from the Texas Farm Bureau Radio Network with Preston Busta and Valerie Zurita Award winning KCWM Agricultural Team.

THE MORNING SHOW, from 6 to 9 a.m., Monday - Friday. A music, weather, talk, and community events format. South Texas listeners start the day with “Carr-Toons on the Radio” and "Your Grandaddy's Country" on the Morning Show on KCWM AM 1460 with Ameripolitan Nominated Best DJs "The Morning Crew Larry Hoffman, J Paul, Doc and Charles"

MIDDAY REPORT – 12 Noon. Weather, agricultural news, market reports and feature programming from the Texas Farm Bureau Radio Network.

In 2019, controlling interest in Hondo Communications, Inc. and KCWM radio transferred to Ann Harwood.
