= WHBK =

- Marshall, North Carolina; United States
- Broadcast area: Madison County, North Carolina; Northern Buncombe County, North Carolina
- Frequency: 1460 kHz
- Branding: Solid Gospel WHBK

Programming
- Format: Southern gospel
- Affiliations: Solid Gospel (Salem); SRN Radio News (Salem); Tar Heel Sports Network; WYFF

Ownership
- Owner: Seay Broadcasting Company; (Seay Broadcasting, Inc.)

History
- First air date: 1954
- Former call signs: WMMH (1954–1988)
- Call sign meaning: Former owners Hurley and Karen Buff

Technical information
- Licensing authority: FCC
- Facility ID: 61264
- Class: D
- Power: 5,000 watts (day); 139 watts (night)
- Transmitter coordinates: 35°48′4.0″N 82°40′48.0″W
- Translator: 95.9 W240DS (Marshall)

Links
- Public license information: Public file; LMS
- Webcast: Listen live
- Website: 1460whbk.com

WHBK is a Southern Gospel formatted broadcast radio station licensed to Marshall, North Carolina, serving Madison County, North Carolina and Northern Buncombe County, North Carolina. WHBK is owned and operated by Seay Broadcasting Company.

== History/Programming ==
WHBK began broadcasting in 1954 as WMMH.

WHBK currently carries a Southern Gospel format fed from Salem Radio Networks Solid Gospel network. The station also carries SRN Radio News, also from Salem, along with weather forecasts from Greenville, South Carolina NBC-affiliate WYFF. Local programming consists of area farm reports, a Trading Post program, a Community Bulletin Board (featuring local events) and other programming. Local sports from Madison High School and college sports from the North Carolina Tar Heels are also heard.
