= Covenant Network =

Catholic radio network in the United States

- Type: Radio network
- Country: United States

History
- Launch date: May 1, 1997

Coverage
- Availability: United States

Links
- Webcast: Listen live
- Website: ourcatholicradio.org

The Covenant Network is a network of Catholic radio stations in the Midwestern United States. Covenant maintains 15 full-power radio stations and a further 25 dependent translators in Illinois, Indiana, Louisiana, Missouri, Nebraska and Oklahoma.

The Covenant Network maintains studios in St. Louis, Missouri, where it owns two AM stations feeding three FM translators. Covenant stations carry EWTN Radio programming as well as network productions and other Catholic radio shows.

== History ==
After looking for stations to buy, Covenant Network began broadcasting May 1, 1997, on WRYT, licensed to Edwardsville, Illinois. After using the Illinois studios acquired from WRYT, Covenant bought a former dance studio on Hampton Avenue in St. Louis and began producing programming. In 1998, Covenant acquired its second station, the former WTIM in Taylorville, Illinois, and renamed it WIHM.

In 2005, Covenant added a second frequency in the St. Louis area when it acquired KIRL in St. Charles, Missouri and relaunched it as KHOJ.

In 2019, Covenant agreed to purchase WQNA in Springfield, Illinois, from Capital Area Career Center for $47,000; Covenant was already heard there on two translators.

== Stations ==
Covenant Network owns 16 full-power stations and 25 dependent translators:

Call sign	Frequency	City of license	State	FCC info
WRYT	1080 AM	Edwardsville	Illinois	FCC (WRYT)
WTTT	88.3 FM	Springfield	Illinois	FCC (WTTT)
W224DC	92.7 FM	Caseyville	Illinois	FCC (W224DC)
KHOJ	1460 AM	St. Charles	Missouri	FCC (KHOJ)
K244FO	96.7 FM	Crestwood	Missouri	FCC (K244FO)
K275CI	102.9 FM	St. Charles	Missouri	FCC (K275CI)
KBKC	90.1 FM	Moberly	Missouri	FCC (KBKC)
K234CC	94.7 FM	Columbia	Missouri	FCC (K234CC)
K277BZ	103.3 FM	Fulton	Missouri	FCC (K277BZ)
KEFL	91.5 FM	Kirksville	Missouri	FCC (KEFL)
W229BU	93.7 FM	Quincy	Illinois	FCC (W229BU)
KHJM	89.1 FM	Dexter	Missouri	FCC (KHJM)
K232FF	94.3 FM	Cape Girardeau	Missouri	FCC (K232FF)
KHJR	88.1 FM	St. Thomas	Missouri	FCC (KHJR)
WCKW	1010 AM	Garyville	Louisiana	FCC (WCKW)
W230CL	93.9 FM	Kenner	Louisiana	FCC (W230CL)
WGMR	91.3 FM	Effingham	Illinois	FCC (WGMR)
W273CF	102.5 FM	Mattoon	Illinois	FCC (W273CF)
WHJR	88.3 FM	Murphysboro	Illinois	FCC (WHJR)
WHOJ	91.9 FM	Terre Haute	Indiana	FCC (WHOJ)
W226AZ	93.1 FM	Martinsville	Illinois	FCC (W226AZ)
W281BG	104.1 FM	Knightsville	Indiana	FCC (W281BG)
WIHM	1410 AM	Taylorville	Illinois	FCC (WIHM)
W296CT	107.1 FM	Stonington	Illinois	FCC (W296CT)
WIHM-FM	88.1 FM	Harrisburg	Illinois	FCC (WIHM-FM)
W275CB	102.9 FM	Mount Vernon	Illinois	FCC (W275CB)
WMSH	90.3 FM	Sparta	Illinois	FCC (WMSH)
K275BU	102.9 FM	Washington	Missouri	FCC (K275BU)
K211GB	90.1 FM	Gray Summit	Missouri	FCC (K211GB)
WOLG	95.9 FM	Carlinville	Illinois	FCC (WOLG)
W205BG	88.9 FM	Springfield	Illinois	
W213CD	90.5 FM	Vincennes	Indiana	FCC (W213CD)
K216GM	91.1 FM	Canton	Missouri	FCC (K216GM)
K219CX	91.7 FM	Atoka	Oklahoma	FCC (K219CX)
W220EN	91.9 FM	Carlyle	Illinois	FCC (W220EN)
W241CC	96.1 FM	Williamsville	Illinois	FCC (W241CC)
W246BL	97.1 FM	Salem	Illinois	FCC (W246BL)
W265CW	100.9 FM	Centralia	Illinois	FCC (W265CW)
W285EX	104.9 FM	Springfield	Illinois	FCC (W285EX)
WRMS	790 AM	Beardstown	Illinois	FCC (WRMS)
W221BX	92.1 FM	Pittsfield	Illinois	FCC (W221BX)
W292FC	106.3 FM	Beardstown	Illinois	FCC (W292FC)
