= WTAX (AM) =

Radio station in Springfield, Illinois

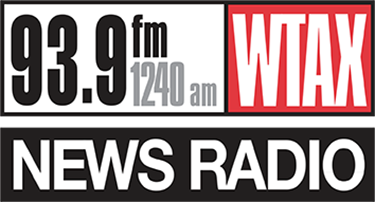
- Springfield, Illinois; United States
- Broadcast area: Springfield metropolitan area
- Frequency: 1240 kHz
- Branding: NewsRadio WTAX

Programming
- Format: News/talk
- Affiliations: ABC News Radio; Compass Media Networks; Premiere Networks; Westwood One

Ownership
- Owner: Saga Communications; (Saga Communications of Illinois, LLC)
- Sister stations: WDBR; WLFZ; WTAX-FM; WYMG

History
- First air date: October 23, 1923 (in Streator, moved to Springfield in 1930)

Technical information
- Licensing authority: FCC
- Facility ID: 9961
- Class: C
- Power: 1,000 watts unlimited
- Transmitter coordinates: 39°47′36″N 89°36′18″W
- Repeater: 93.9 WTAX-FM (Sherman)

Links
- Public license information: Public file; LMS
- Webcast: Listen live
- Website: www.capitolcitynow.com

WTAX (1240 kHz) is a commercial radio station licensed to serve Springfield, Illinois. It is owned by Saga Communications, and operates as part of its Capitol Radio Group. WTAX simulcasts a news/talk radio format with 93.9 WTAX-FM. The station's studios and offices are on East Sangamon Avenue in Springfield.

WTAX broadcasts at 1,000 watts, using a non-directional antenna; its transmitter is located on South Dirksen Highway in Springfield.

== History ==
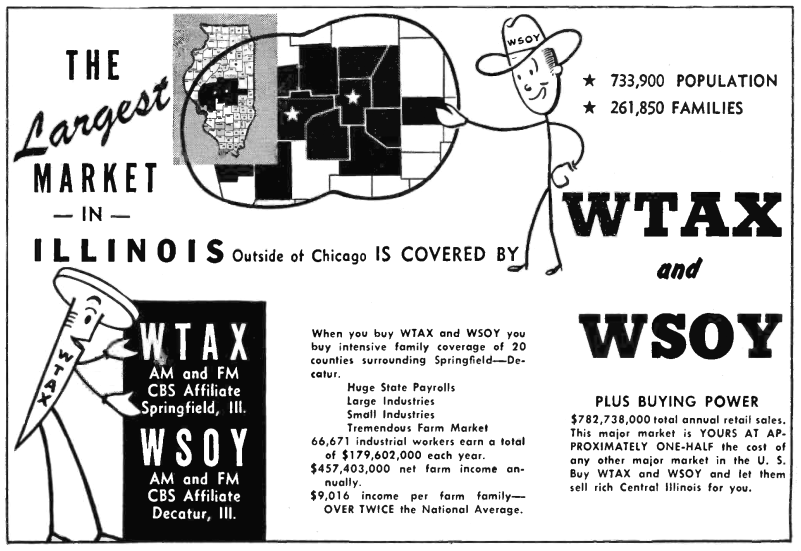
1951 advertisement for WTAX and WSOY in Decatur.

WTAX's first license was granted on October 11, 1923, to the Williams Hardware Company in Streator, Illinois. The call letters were randomly assigned by the government from a sequential list of available call signs. It was initially on 1300 kHz, with a power of 20 watts. In mid-1927 the station was reassigned to 930 kHz.

Following the establishment of the Federal Radio Commission (FRC), stations were initially issued a series of temporary authorizations starting on May 3, 1927. In addition, they were informed that if they wanted to continue operating, they needed to file a formal license application by January 15, 1928, as the first step in determining whether they met the new "public interest, convenience, or necessity" standard. On May 25, 1928, the FRC issued General Order 32, which notified 164 stations, including WTAX, that "From an examination of your application for future license it does not find that public interest, convenience, or necessity would be served by granting it." However, the station successfully convinced the commission that it should remain licensed.

On November 11, 1928, with the implementation of the Federal Radio Commission's General Order 40, WTAX was moved to 1210 kHz. The station relocated to Springfield in late 1930. On March 29, 1941, most stations on 1210 kHz, including WTAX, moved to 1240 kHz, under the provisions of the North American Regional Broadcasting Agreement.

In 1948, WTAX added an FM station, broadcasting at 103.7 MHz, WTAX-FM. That station is now WDBR. Recently, co-owned 93.9 FM has taken the WTAX-FM call letters to simulcast the news/talk programming on 1240 AM.

Programming was previously also broadcast on 107.5 FM, over translator station W298AP, which once served as a second signal for sister adult hits station WABZ. The W298AP simulcast lasted until January 31, 2017, when W298AP switched to oldies, now simulcasting WDBR's HD3 subchannel.

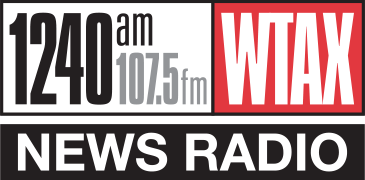
WTAX's logo under previous simulcast with 107.5 FM translator
