= WRAN (FM) =

Coordinates: 39°27′8.00″N 89°17′10.00″W

- Taylorville, Illinois; United States
- Frequency: 97.3 MHz
- Branding: groovy 97.3

Programming
- Format: Oldies

Ownership
- Owner: Miller Communications, Inc.
- Sister stations: WMKR

History
- First air date: 1997 (as WTIM-FM)
- Former call signs: WTIM-FM (1997–2014); WSVZ (7/2014-8/2014)

Technical information
- Licensing authority: FCC
- Facility ID: 79008
- Class: A
- ERP: 4,600 watts
- HAAT: 114 meters (374 ft)

Links
- Public license information: Public file; LMS
- Website: WRAN Online

WRAN (97.3 FM; "Groovy 97.3") is a radio station licensed to Taylorville, Illinois. The station broadcasts an oldies format and is owned by Miller Communications, Inc.

Until August 1, 2014, the station was WTIM-FM, with a news/talk format. The format and WTIM call letters moved to 870 AM at that time; the oldies format and WRAN call letters were then moved from 98.3 FM (which became country music station WSVZ).
