= WMAY =

WMAY may refer to:

- WMAY (AM), a radio station on 970 AM in Springfield, Illinois, United States
- WMAY-FM, a radio station on 97.7 FM in Taylorville, Illinois, United States
