= Sherman, Illinois =

Sherman
- Village
- Location of Sherman in Sangamon County, Illinois.
- Coordinates: 39°52′40″N 89°36′45″W
- Country: United States
- State: Illinois
- County: Sangamon

Area
  - Total: 3.19 sq mi (8.25 km^{2})
  - Land: 3.14 sq mi (8.14 km^{2})
  - Water: 0.042 sq mi (0.11 km^{2})
- Elevation: 571 ft (174 m)

Population (2020)
  - Total: 4,673
  - Density: 1,487.4/sq mi (574.28/km^{2})
- Time zone: UTC-6 (CST)
  - Summer (DST): UTC-5 (CDT)
- ZIP code: 62684
- Area code: 217
- FIPS code: 17-69342
- GNIS feature ID: 2399802
- Website: www.shermanil.org

Sherman is a village in Sangamon County, Illinois, United States. The population was 4,673 at the 2020 census. It is part of the Springfield metropolitan statistical area. In 2023 the village was hit by a high end EF-2 tornado in the March 31st outbreak.

== Geography ==
According to the 2010 census, Sherman has a total area of 3.235 square miles (8.38 km^{2}), of which 3.19 square miles (8.26 km^{2}) (or 98.61%) is land and 0.045 square miles (0.12 km^{2}) (or 1.39%) is water.

=== Places of Interest ===
- The Rail Golf Course, an 18-hole golf course and home of the LPGA State Farm Classic from 1976 to 2006.
- Route 66 Crossing, a retail and commercial district located on Sherman's north side.
- Sherman Village Park, a 10-acre park located on Sherman's south side. The park includes an amphitheatre, pavilions, a pond, and a 1-mile walking/cycling trail.
- Sherman-Williamsville Trail, a 4.4 mile rail trail linking Sherman and Williamsville.

== Demographics ==
Historical population
Census	Pop.	Note	%±
1880	73		—
1960	209		—
1970	519		148.3%
1980	1,501		189.2%
1990	2,080		38.6%
2000	2,871		38.0%
2010	4,148		44.5%
2020	4,673		12.7%
U.S. Decennial Census

=== 2020 census ===
As of the 2020 census, Sherman had a population of 4,673. The median age was 42.2 years. 25.6% of residents were under the age of 18 and 20.3% of residents were 65 years of age or older. For every 100 females there were 93.7 males, and for every 100 females age 18 and over there were 87.6 males age 18 and over.

99.7% of residents lived in urban areas, while 0.3% lived in rural areas.

There were 1,726 households in Sherman, of which 37.9% had children under the age of 18 living in them. Of all households, 65.2% were married-couple households, 10.4% were households with a male householder and no spouse or partner present, and 20.1% were households with a female householder and no spouse or partner present. About 18.8% of all households were made up of individuals and 10.7% had someone living alone who was 65 years of age or older.

There were 1,779 housing units, of which 3.0% were vacant. The homeowner vacancy rate was 1.4% and the rental vacancy rate was 5.0%.

Racial composition as of the 2020 census
Race	Number	Percent
White	4,379	93.7%
Black or African American	43	0.9%
American Indian and Alaska Native	4	0.1%
Asian	50	1.1%
Native Hawaiian and Other Pacific Islander	0	0.0%
Some other race	20	0.4%
Two or more races	177	3.8%
Hispanic or Latino (of any race)	82	1.8%

=== 2000 census ===
As of the census of 2000, there were 2,871 people, 962 households, and 771 families residing in the village. The population density was 933.5 inhabitants per square mile (360.4/km^{2}). There were 989 housing units at an average density of 321.6 per square mile (124.2/km^{2}). The racial makeup of the village was 97.74% White, 0.31% African American, 0.42% Native American, 1.01% Asian, 0.07% Pacific Islander, 0.03% from other races, and 0.42% from two or more races. Hispanic or Latino of any race were 0.52% of the population.

There were 962 households, out of which 41.8% had children under the age of 18 living with them, 70.6% were married couples living together, 7.0% had a female householder with no husband present, and 19.8% were non-families. 16.2% of all households were made up of individuals, and 7.1% had someone living alone who was 65 years of age or older. An estimated 1.2% of households are same-sex couples. The average household size was 2.78 and the average family size was 3.13.

In the village, the population was spread out, with 26.6% under the age of 18, 5.6% from 18 to 24, 27.5% from 25 to 44, 25.2% from 45 to 64, and 15.1% who were 65 years of age or older. The median age was 39 years. For every 100 females, there were 90.9 males. For every 100 females age 18 and over, there were 86.3 males.

=== Income and poverty ===
As of 2016, the median income for a household in the village was $94,695. Males had a median income of $59,582 versus $47,421 for females. The median property value for the village was $217,200. None of the families and 1.47% of the population were living below the poverty line.

== Education ==
Sherman is part of the Williamsville-Sherman Community Unit School District #15. Williamsville CUSD #15 was one of five area schools awarded the Bright Star Award for educational excellence at the elementary and high school level.
