= WTIM =

Coordinates: 39°29′14″N 88°57′31″W

- Assumption, Illinois; United States
- Broadcast area: Decatur, Illinois
- Frequency: 870 kHz

Programming
- Format: News/Talk

Ownership
- Owner: Randal Miller; (Miller Communications, Inc.)

History
- First air date: 1972
- Former call signs: WSHY (1972–1998); WDID (1998–2001); WINU (2001–2014); WTLY (5/9/2014-5/29/2014); WSVZ (5/2014-7/2014)

Technical information
- Licensing authority: FCC
- Facility ID: 73996
- Class: D
- Power: 500 watts daytime only
- Translators: 107.5 MHz-W298CD (Shelbyville); 107.9 MHz-W300EH (Assumption); 96.1 MHz-W241CF (Taylorville)

Links
- Public license information: Public file; LMS
- Webcast: Listen live
- Website: WTIM's website

WTIM (870 AM) is a radio station licensed to Assumption, Illinois, United States. The station broadcasts a news-talk format, and is currently owned by Randal Miller, through licensee Miller Communications, Inc. WTIM is also heard in Taylorville, Illinois through a translator on 96.1 FM.

WWL in New Orleans is the dominant Class A station on 870 AM. WTIM must leave the air from sunset to sunrise to protect the nighttime Skywave signal of WWL.

Call sign	Frequency	City of license	FID	ERP (W)	HAAT	Class	FCC info
W298CD	107.5 FM	Shelbyville, Illinois	141267	250	45 m (148 ft)	D	LMS
W300EH	107.9 FM	Assumption, Illinois	200237	250	90 m (295 ft)	D	LMS
W241CF	96.1 FM	Taylorville, Illinois	85685	250	97 m (318 ft)	D	LMS
