= Algonquin, Illinois =

- Village
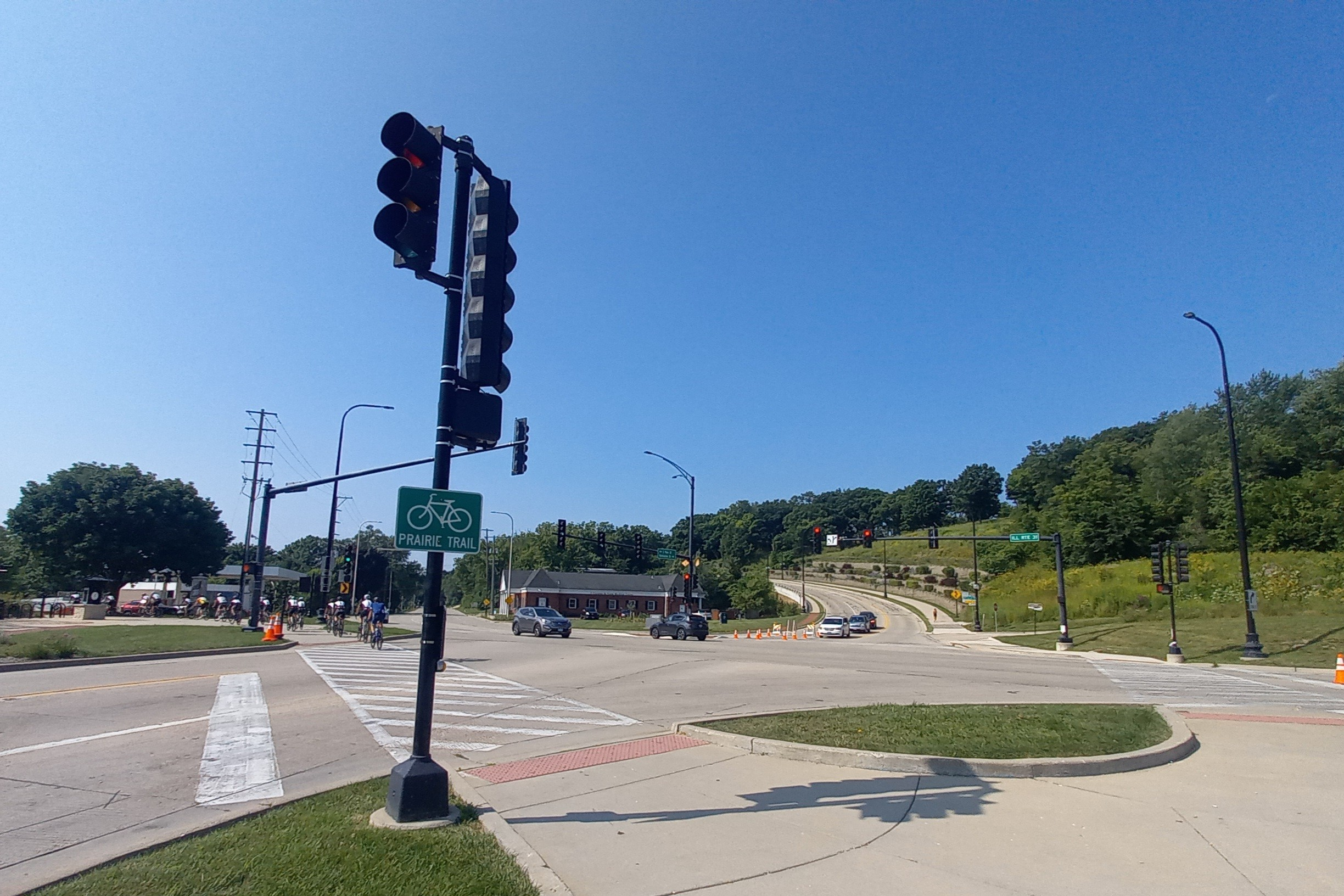
- Prairie Trail and Illinois Route 31 at Main Street

- Flag Seal
- Interactive map of Algonquin, Illinois
- Location within Chicago metropolitan area Location within Illinois Location within the United States
- Coordinates: 42°09′52″N 88°20′50″W
- Country: United States
- State: Illinois
- Counties: McHenry, Kane
- Townships: Algonquin, Grafton, Dundee, Rutland
- Incorporated: 1890

Government
  - Type: Council–manager
  - Village President: Debby Sosine

Area
  - Total: 12.34 sq mi (31.96 km^{2})
  - Land: 12.14 sq mi (31.43 km^{2})
  - Water: 0.20 sq mi (0.52 km^{2})
- Elevation: 886 ft (270 m)

Population (2020)
  - Total: 29,700
  - Density: 2,447.1/sq mi (944.82/km^{2})
- Time zone: UTC-6 (CST)
  - Summer (DST): UTC-5 (CDT)
- ZIP code: 60102
- North American Numbering Plan: 847 and 224
- FIPS code: 17-00685
- GNIS feature ID: 2397931
- Website: www.algonquin.org

Algonquin is a village in McHenry and Kane counties, Illinois, United States. It is a suburb of Chicago located approximately 40 miles (64 km) northwest of the Loop. The population was 29,700 as of the 2020 census.

== History ==
Long before Europeans settled in Algonquin, the Potawatomi originally inhabited the land. Algonquin was the location of Indian burial mounds known in the 1800s as the Algonquin Mounds. By 1834 the first settler of Algonquin, Samuel Gillilan, came to the area from Virginia. Settlers Dr. Cornish, Dr. Plumleigh, Eli Henderson, Alex Dawson, and William Jackson arrived shortly thereafter. There was some dispute regarding the original name of Algonquin, and numerous other names were suggested including Denny's Ferry, Cornish Ferry, Cornishville, and Osceola. But Samuel Edwards suggested the name Algonquin and on December 23, 1847, the name Algonquin became official.

The first signs of economic growth occurred in 1855 when the town saw the construction of the railroad, which enabled farmers in the neighboring area to have other means of getting their products to the markets in Chicago. Finally on February 25, 1890, the Village of Algonquin was formed.

The Village Hall of Algonquin was erected on January 31, 1907, at 2 South Main Street, and is still standing today, where it functions as a historical landmark and community gathering place. It served as the village hall of Algonquin until a new village hall was built at 2200 Harnish Drive in 1996.

From 1906 to 1913, the automobile companies began to go to the Algonquin Hill Climbs, which was an event where if an automobile was able to make it up a series of steep hills in the village, it would be given the stamp of approval. And because of that, the Algonquin Cup was formed which received national recognition at the time. The two hills used in the race were the Phillips Hill which extends from Illinois Route 31 to the cemetery and Perry Hill, located south of downtown, and which is now Lundstrom Lane. The village created a new hill for the race called Huntington Hill, which is now Huntington Drive. A park stands in place of the finish line of Huntington Hill at the intersection of Huntington Drive and Circle Drive which is called Hill Climb Park. The festival in recognition of the event continues to be held each year.

Algonquin road route 62 now, was once noted as the first bridge to be installed on an incline. The first bridge was level with a steep incline headed east. It was later replaced with a four-lane bridge with an incline to reduce stress on vehicles headed east.

For much of the 20th century, Algonquin was a quasi-resort town and people from the Chicago area would visit the town in order to escape urban life. The Fox River offered immense recreational opportunities and several summer homes were constructed. Soon, more people began living in Algonquin year-round. Algonquin remained a small town for much of the 20th Century, growing steadily, until the 1980s, when the village's population exploded with new residential construction. The development continued in earnest in the 1990s and 2000s. The village's first shopping center, Algonquin Town Center, was constructed in the late 1980s on East Algonquin Road and numerous die & mold industries were established west of downtown

In the 1990s, development shifted to Randall Road, which saw the construction of numerous retailers, restaurants, and services. In 2004, the 80-store Algonquin Commons outdoor mall (the largest outdoor mall in Illinois) opened for business, followed by the Algonquin Galleria outdoor mall, which is under development and saw its first stores open in 2006. In the mid-2000s, development also began on the Algonquin Corporate Campus, which is slated to include industrial and office development spread over 1,000 acres (4.0 km^{2}) on the southwest side of the village, bringing hundreds of high-paying jobs to the area.

== Geography ==
Algonquin is located in southeastern McHenry County and northeastern Kane County. It is bordered to the north by Lake in the Hills, to the northeast by Cary, to the east by Barrington Hills, and to the south by Carpentersville, the northwest by Lakewood, the southwest by Gilberts, and the west by Huntley.

According to the 2021 census gazetteer files, Algonquin has a total area of 12.33 square miles (31.93 km^{2}), of which 12.13 square miles (31.42 km^{2}) (or 98.36%) is land and 0.20 square miles (0.52 km^{2}) (or 1.64%) is water. Approximately 78% of the village area is in McHenry County, with the remainder in Kane County.

=== Surrounding areas ===
	Lake in the Hills
Lake in the Hills		Trout Valley
Huntley		Barrington Hills
Gilberts		Carpentersville
	Carpentersville

== Demographics ==
Historical population
Census	Pop.	Note	%±
1880	286		—
1890	473		65.4%
1900	550		16.3%
1910	642		16.7%
1920	693		7.9%
1930	850		22.7%
1940	926		8.9%
1950	1,223		32.1%
1960	2,014		64.7%
1970	3,515		74.5%
1980	5,684		61.7%
1990	11,663		105.2%
2000	23,276		99.6%
2010	30,046		29.1%
2020	29,700		−1.2%
U.S. Decennial Census; 2010 2020

=== Racial and ethnic composition ===
Algonquin village, Illinois – Racial and ethnic composition Note: the US Census treats Hispanic/Latino as an ethnic category. This table excludes Latinos from the racial categories and assigns them to a separate category. Hispanics/Latinos may be of any race.
Race / Ethnicity (NH = Non-Hispanic)	Pop 2000	Pop 2010	Pop 2020	% 2000	% 2010	% 2020
White alone (NH)	21,327	24,847	22,327	91.63%	82.70%	75.18%
Black or African American alone (NH)	194	507	704	0.83%	1.69%	2.37%
Native American or Alaska Native alone (NH)	20	43	27	0.09%	0.14%	0.09%
Asian alone (NH)	542	2,174	2,143	2.33%	7.24%	7.22%
Pacific Islander alone (NH)	2	11	7	0.01%	0.04%	0.02%
Other race alone (NH)	41	31	85	0.18%	0.10%	0.29%
Mixed race or Multiracial (NH)	202	388	1,048	0.87%	1.29%	3.53%
Hispanic or Latino (any race)	948	2,045	3,359	4.07%	6.81%	11.31%
Total	23,276	30,046	29,700	100.00%	100.00%	100.00%

=== 2020 census ===
As of the 2020 census, Algonquin had a population of 29,700.

The median age was 41.9 years. 22.1% of residents were under the age of 18 and 14.4% of residents were 65 years of age or older. For every 100 females, there were 95.8 males, and for every 100 females age 18 and over there were 95.0 males age 18 and over.

99.6% of residents lived in urban areas, while 0.4% lived in rural areas.

Of the 10,769 households, 33.4% had children under the age of 18 living in them. Of all households, 63.3% were married-couple households, 12.0% were households with a male householder and no spouse or partner present, and 19.3% were households with a female householder and no spouse or partner present. About 19.8% of all households were made up of individuals, and 8.9% had someone living alone who was 65 years of age or older. The average household size was 3.13 and the average family size was 2.76.

There were 11,107 housing units, of which 3.0% were vacant. The homeowner vacancy rate was 1.3%, and the rental vacancy rate was 4.9%.

=== Income and poverty ===
The median income for a household in the village was $109,819, and the median income for a family was $127,660. Males had a median income of $71,698 versus $41,039 for females. The per capita income for the village was $46,601. About 3.2% of families and 4.2% of the population were below the poverty line, including 4.5% of those under age 18 and 3.6% of those age 65 or over.

== Government ==
=== Village of Algonquin ===
Algonquin has a council-manager form of government, where an elected Board of Trustees, led by the Village President, establishes policy & vision and approves ordinances & resolutions, while an appointed Village Manager leads a team of professional staff that carries out the policies and daily operations of the village.

The Village President is Debby Sosine, and the current Trustees are Maggie Auger, Laura Brehmer, Brian Dianis, Jerry Glogowski, Bob Smith, and John Spella. The Village Clerk, who handles village records, is Fred Martin. All officials are elected to four-year terms staggered to maintain consistency. The current Village Manager is Tim Schloneger.

=== Fire protection ===
Algonquin's fire protection and rescue services are handled by either the Algonquin-Lake in the Hills Fire Protection District (ALITHFPD), the Huntley Fire Protection District (HFPD), or the Carpentersville Countryside Fire Protection District (CCFPD).

== Education ==
=== School District 300 ===
Community Unit School District 300, a large district generally along and east of Randall Rd. The District 300 schools serving Algonquin include:

- Neubert Elementary School (K-5) serves students residing in areas immediately west of the Old Town District.
- Lincoln Prairie Elementary School (P-5) in nearby Lake in the Hills serves students residing in sections of the village near Randall Road.
- Eastview Elementary School (K-5) serves students residing in areas within Old Town Algonquin, as well as areas immediately north and east of there.
- Algonquin Lakes Elementary School (K-5) serves students residing in far eastern sections of the village. It is in Kane County.
- Lake in the Hills Elementary School (K-5) serves students that live in Lake in the Hills.
- Liberty Elementary School (K-5) in nearby Carpentersville serves students living in the Brittany Hills, Providence Point, Providence Point 2, and Shenandoah neighborhoods.
- Westfield Community School (K-8) is a combined elementary-middle school. The elementary school serves the Willoughby Farms area. In addition to Westfield Elementary, Neubert, Lincoln Prairie, and Lake in the Hills elementary schools feed into Westfield Middle School. Westfield Middle School feeds mostly into Jacobs High School.
- Dundee Middle School (6–8) in nearby Dundee serves students living in the Liberty Elementary School area and feeds mostly into Jacobs High School.
- Algonquin Middle School (6–8) serves Eastview and Algonquin Lakes, and feeds mostly into Dundee-Crown High School.
- Harry D. Jacobs High School (9–12) serves high-school aged students residing generally west of the Fox River to just a half mile west of Randall Road.
- Dundee-Crown High School (9–12) in nearby Carpentersville serves high school-aged students living in the east half of the village.

=== School District 158 ===
Consolidated School District 158 is headquartered in Algonquin, and the schools on the Square Barn Road campus serve the village's far western side, as well as portions of neighboring communities Huntley and Lake in the Hills. School District 158 schools serving far western Algonquin include:

- Mackeben Elementary School (K-2)
- Marion Conley Elementary School (3–5)
- Bernice Heinemann Middle School (6–8)
- Huntley High School (9–12) in nearby Huntley serves high school-aged students residing in far western sections of the village.

=== Private schools ===
St. Margaret Mary Catholic School, located in the heart of Algonquin, offer private K-8 education. On the west side of town is Foundations Montessori School.

=== Community colleges ===
The nearest community colleges are McHenry County College and Elgin Community College. Generally speaking, McHenry County College serves residents residing in District 158 boundaries, while Elgin Community College serves residents residing in District 300 boundaries.

=== Libraries ===
The majority of the village is served by the Algonquin Area Public Library District which includes two facilities, the main branch on Harnish, just west of Randall Road, and a second branch on Eastgate, south of Algonquin Road. Both offer educational and reading programs. Huntley Public Library, Dundee Township Library, and the Barrington Area Library also serve certain sections of the village.

== Economy ==
A growing number of businesses can be found in Algonquin. From a manufacturing corridor along Algonquin Road between Pyott Road and Route 31 to a planned corporate campus on the west side of Randall Road, industry is a significant part of the Algonquin area economy.

=== Industry ===
==== Algonquin Industrial Park ====
Just west of the village's Old Town District is the Algonquin Industrial Park, located along Algonquin Road. Several major companies can be found in this area, including tool, die, and mold industries, plastics industries, and transportation-related businesses. Algonquin's main Post Office is also located in this area. The post office also serves nearby Lake in the Hills, even though the two municipalities have separate zip codes.

==== Algonquin Corporate Campus ====
Under development is the Algonquin Corporate Campus on the village's west side along Randall Road. Set on over 1,000 acres (4.0 km^{2}) stretching from Randall Road west to Square Barn Road, and north of Huntley Road, the development is aimed at providing more jobs to the greater Algonquin area. As a result, any potential business or building in the park that brings high-paying jobs has the opportunity for incentives and to have the development review process expedited. Businesses the village is targeting for the park include those specializing in healthcare, technology, and research and development. Located directly adjacent to the Algonquin Corporate Campus are the village's outdoor malls Algonquin Commons and Algonquin Galleria. Also part of the park is the mixed-use Esplanade development, which currently includes 2nd and 3rd story office space for several companies.

==== Other industries ====
Other major industries in Algonquin include Duro-Life, a manufacturer of machine parts located along Randall Road, and Meyer Material Service, a mining company located along Route 31.

There is also over 250,000 sq ft (23,000 m^{2}). of small office and medical office space located in various buildings throughout town, most heavily concentrated along Randall Road, Algonquin Road, and Illinois Route 31. The largest such series of office buildings is the Briarwood Center at the intersection of Randall Road and County Line Road.

=== Commerce ===
The village of Algonquin is a center for shopping activities, both regionally and locally. Most of the village's retail is confined to Randall Road and, to a lesser extent, Algonquin Road.

==== Randall Road Corridor ====
The Randall Road corridor is a regional shopping, dining, and entertainment corridor that is home to a variety of shopping centers. The retail corridor also extends partially into nearby Lake in the Hills and Carpentersville. In addition to serving the needs of the local western Algonquin area, the corridor also functions as a major destination retail area serving a vast region that includes most of McHenry and northern Kane Counties.

==== East Algonquin Road Corridor ====
The East Algonquin Road retail corridor is primarily a neighborhood retail area that serves the general needs of eastern Algonquin and also portions of nearby Carpentersville and Barrington. The area is centered on Algonquin's first shopping center, Algonquin Town Center, which was constructed in the late 1980s.

==== West Algonquin Road Corridor ====
Like the East Algonquin Road Corridor, the West Algonquin Road Corridor is a neighborhood retail area, composed mostly of small retail shops, restaurants, and neighborhood services. This is a newer retail area, with most of the retailers having been constructed in the 1990s and 2000s. The corridor predominantly serves western Algonquin and Lake in the Hills.

==== Old Town District ====
The village's Old Town District, focused primarily along Main Street/Illinois Route 31 includes dozens of independent retailers and franchises, offices, and fine restaurants. Other strip centers can be found nearby along Route 31 including the Fox River Center and Edgewood Plaza.

== Recreation ==
The village does not have an actual park district, as park operations are run by the village itself. Nevertheless, the quality of parks, trails, and programs is nearly unmatched. In addition, the village's scenic waterways remain a regional draw. Some noteworthy recreational opportunities in Algonquin include:

- Downtown Algonquin, a compact downtown featuring several shops and restaurants near the Fox River, as well as features like upscale lighting, planters, and well-kept sidewalks.
- The Fox River, a major tributary in Illinois which runs north–south through the heart of the village's downtown.
- Fox River Trail/McHenry County Prairie Path, a sub-section of the Grand Illinois Trail
- A 26-mile (42 km) trail system consisting of a mixture of off-road neighborhood trail systems and on-street route designation
- Kelliher Park, a park on the village's far western side featuring several ballfields.
- Ted Spella Park, a large park under development on the village's west side.
- Snapper Field and Lions Pool, a recreational complex near Algonquin Middle School featuring ballfields and the municipal pool
- Towne Park, Cornish Park, and Riverfront Park, three parks located in the village's downtown, significant for the role they play in the popular Founders Days festival and several other downtown events throughout the year.
- Presidential Park, an important recreational area for the village's eastside residents, it features several ballfields and open areas, as well as a few picnic shelters.
- Algonquin Lakes, a grouping of natural and man-made lakes, trails, and adjacent community park in a residential neighborhood by the same name on the village's eastern side.
- Manchester Lakes, a grouping of man-made lakes, recreational areas, and complex bike path system within a neighborhood by the same name on the village's far western side.
- Woods Creek, a scenic creek, nature preserve, and trail which runs south–north through the village's far western side
- Hill Climb Park, a relatively new park at the intersection of Circle and Huntington Drives
- ALITHSA, the Algonquin Lake in the Hills Soccer Association, which provides fall and spring season soccer experiences for children ages four through high school.
- AAYO, the Algonquin Area Youth Organization, which utilizes many of the ballfields in the area for tee-ball, softball, and baseball leagues for children from age five to high school.
- Golf Course of Illinois, situated in a lovely golf community off of Randal and County Road. A favorite of top golfers including a mentor of golf professional Tiger Woods.

== Festivals and traditions ==
- The Hill Climb Race, a very historic tradition in the village in which classic cars are driven up a hill in the southwestern part of downtown. According to tradition, in the infancy of automobile production, a car's worth was judged based upon its ability to climb this particular hill in the town. The event is held in the spring.
- Algonquin Summer Concerts, held at Towne Park, features several outdoor musical performances by local and regional acts on Thursdays during the summer.
- Art on the Fox, a fine art festival held on Main Street, usually in September. Artwork is showcased and sold at the event, and live musical entertainment and artist demonstrations are sometimes featured as well.
- Founders' Days, the village's cornerstone festival and tradition, it includes a carnival, parade, fireworks display, bags tournament, Founders Run, Taste of Algonquin. It is always held on the last full weekend in July.
- National Night Out, a national event that the village participates in, which is designed to promote community spirit and awareness in order to combat crime. Held in early August at Snapper Field and Lions-Armstrong Memorial Pool on the east side of the village.
- A number of events held annually at Algonquin Commons, including Touch-a-Truck, summer concerts, holiday carriage rides, and other special events.
- Algonquin's Public Art Program, which showcases pieces of artwork at prominent public locations in the village throughout the year. The program emphasizes the various styles of artwork and the importance of art in the community. The artwork is rotated annually.
- Polish-American Fest, held at Saint Margaret Mary's Catholic Church. Algonquin has one of the largest Polish communities in the Chicago suburbs.
- Miracle On Main, is a festival found on Main Street and adjacent areas. All of the events associated with it typically take place on the first Saturday of December; celebrating the holiday season. The event features ice sculptures, live performances and more festive festivities.

== Transportation ==
Pace provides bus service on Route 550 along Randall Road in Algonquin connecting Crystal Lake and Elgin.

Algonquin is a center of transportation for McHenry and Kane Counties. Some of the major roadways include:

- Randall Road is a major multi-lane highway serving the village's western side. The road is entirely lined with major outdoor shopping malls, big-box retailers, restaurants, and a major corporate center which serve the region. For a mile-long stretch between Harnish Drive and Corporate Parkway, near the village's malls, the road is six lanes wide with a landscaped center median with dual left turn lanes. Elsewhere, the road is four lanes wide with a striped median with single left turn lanes. The road connects Algonquin with Crystal Lake and Lake in the Hills on the north and Carpentersville, Elgin, South Elgin, Geneva, and the rest of the Fox River Valley suburbs to the south.
- Illinois Route 25 is a north–south road on the village's eastern side which ends at Illinois Route 62. It connects the village to Carpentersville, East Dundee, Elgin, and the rest of the Fox River Valley suburbs to its south.
- Illinois Route 31 (Main Street) is a major north–south road going through the heart of the village's downtown. Despite Route 31's high traffic volume, the road is only two lanes wide with a center striped median and left turn lanes, resulting in considerable backups at the road's intersection with Algonquin Road. In the Old Town District, there are on-street parallel parking spots to service the downtown shops located along the road. Because the shops and many other buildings are so close to the road, widening is not an option to ease traffic congestion, so a western 31 bypass of the village's downtown is planned. This bypass would include an interchange at Algonquin Road, currently one of the most congested intersections in McHenry County. Illinois Route 31 connects to Crystal Lake and McHenry on the north and Carpentersville, West Dundee, Elgin, and St. Charles on the south.
- Illinois Route 62 (Algonquin Road) is a major east–west arterial road. West of Illinois Route 31, the road loses the Illinois Route 62 designation and becomes a county highway (Algonquin Road) that continues west to Illinois Route 47. The road is locally infamous for its westbound backups from Sandbloom Road west to Illinois Route 31, particularly during the weekday evening rush hour. Algonquin Road is four lanes with a center median for its entirety in the village. West of Randall Road, the median is landscaped, while east of Randall, it is striped. Algonquin Road connects the village to Huntley on the west and other major northwest suburbs like Hoffman Estates, Schaumburg, Arlington Heights, Mount Prospect, and Des Plaines on the east. West of Pyott Road, Algonquin Road roughly forms the border between Algonquin and Lake in the Hills.
- Lake Cook Road terminates at East Algonquin Road on the eastern edge of the village and connects it to Barrington, Palatine, Arlington Heights, Buffalo Grove, Wheeling, Northbrook and Glencoe.
- Pyott Road and Lakewood Road terminate at West Algonquin Road, just north of the village limits, and connect the village to Lake in the Hills, Crystal Lake, and Lakewood.
- Longmeadow Parkway is a minor east–west road that currently connects Huntley Road on the southwest side of the village to IL Route 62 in Barrington Hills via a newly constructed bridge (2019) over the Fox River.
- Other important roads within Algonquin include Highland Avenue, River Road, Haegers Bend Road, Sandbloom Road, Souwanas Trail, Edgewood Drive, Hanson Road, County Line Road, Sleepy Hollow Road, Huntington Drive, Harnish Drive, Square Barn Road, Stonegate Road, Bunker Hill Drive, Boyer Road, and Corporate Parkway.

Algonquin was previously served by a rail line between Elgin and Crystal Lake. It closed in the 1930s.

== Notable people ==
- Rockne Brubaker, ice skater, 2-time national champion
- Josh Caterer, musician
- Evan Jager, American record-holder in the 3,000 meter steeplechase and silver medalist at the 2016 Summer Olympics
- Cameron Krutwig, professional basketball player in Spain
