= WHRU =

WHRU may refer to:

- WHRU-LP, a low-power radio station (101.5 FM) licensed to serve Huntley, Illinois, United States
- Waste heat recovery unit
