= Lake in the Hills, Illinois =

- Village
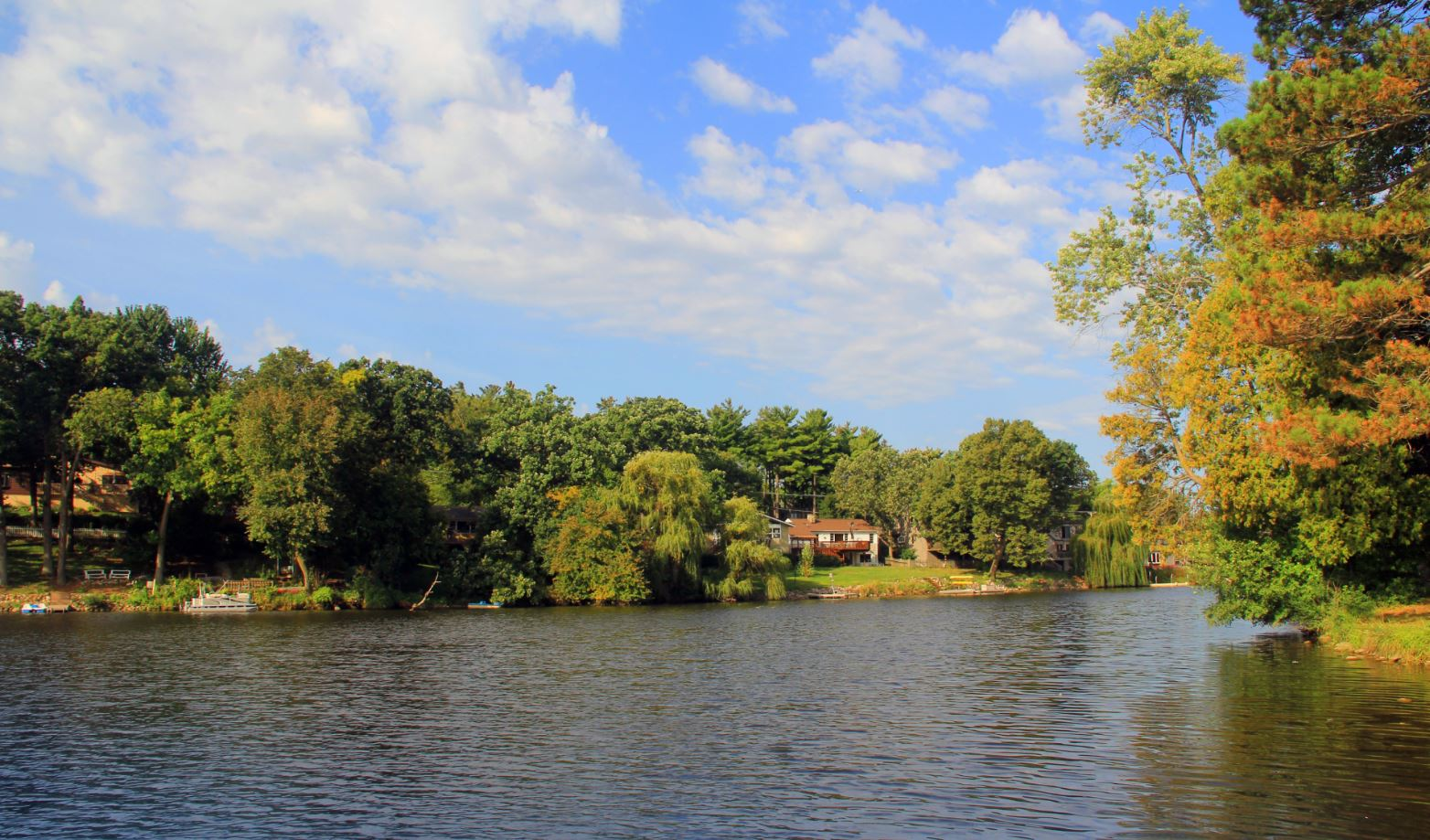

- Flag Seal

- Location of Lake in the Hills in McHenry County, Illinois.

- Location within Illinois
- Coordinates: 42°11′32″N 88°20′51″W
- Country: United States
- State: Illinois
- County: McHenry
- Township: Grafton, Algonquin
- Incorporated: 1952

Government
  - Type: Village President/Trustee

Area
  - Total: 10.44 sq mi (27.03 km^{2})
  - Land: 10.20 sq mi (26.43 km^{2})
  - Water: 0.24 sq mi (0.61 km^{2})
- Elevation: 814 ft (248 m)

Population (2020)
  - Total: 28,982
  - Density: 2,840.5/sq mi (1,096.72/km^{2})
- Time zone: UTC-6 (CST)
  - Summer (DST): UTC-5 (CDT)
- ZIP code: 60156
- Area code(s): 847 & 224
- FIPS code: 17-41183
- GNIS feature ID: 2398378
- Website: www.lith.org

Lake in the Hills is a village in McHenry County, Illinois, United States. As of the 2020 census, the population was 28,982.

The village is most known for its very high residential growth which occurred most heavily in the 1990s. Once a sleepy lakeside village of cottages and small ranches, its population skyrocketed as developers flocked to the area in the 1990s. Its population increased by 17,000 people (a nearly 400% increase) over this period, making it one of the most rapidly growing suburbs of Chicago and in the United States at that time. At the height of its building boom, the village issued over 1,000 residential building permits in 1995.

== History ==
Lake in the Hills was founded in 1923 by Federal Judge Walter J. LaBuy around Woods Creek Lake, which is the main lake in Lake in the Hills. By the year 1926, La Buy bought 472 acres (1.91 km^{2}) of land which is currently Indian Trail. On this land, he built five stucco homes; only one stands in its original state, which is currently owned by the Village of Lake in the Hills. The other four original stucco homes have been altered in some way, but all still stand in the original spot by Woods Creek Lake.

The early days of Lake in the Hills saw vacationers from the Chicago area, who wanted to spend some time away from the hustle and bustle of the city. By 1950, some of the vacationers became year-round residents of Lake in the Hills. On November 29, 1952, the Village of Lake in the Hills was formed.

The village of Lake in the Hills remained a small, close-knit lakeside residential community for much of the 20th Century, relying on nearby towns like Algonquin and Crystal Lake for services. In 1987, the Village's first shopping center was constructed; it was built at the intersection of Algonquin Road and Oakleaf Road. In the late 1980s and early 1990s, the Village made a series of large annexations extending west of Randall Road, all the way west to Illinois Route 47. Numerous subdivisions were constructed in this area throughout the 1990s and 2000s and retail development blossomed along Randall Road during this time period as well. By the mid-2000s, development had slowed down and as the Village became landlocked by other municipalities, it worked to appropriately develop its remaining parcels.

== Geography ==
According to the 2010 census, Lake in the Hills has a total area of 10.614 square miles (27.49 km^{2}), of which 10.38 square miles (26.88 km^{2}) (or 97.8%) is land and 0.234 square miles (0.61 km^{2}) (or 2.2%) is water.

=== Surrounding areas ===
	Lakewood / Crystal Lake
Unincorporated Grafton Township		Cary
Huntley		Cary / Trout Valley
Huntley		Algonquin
	Algonquin

== Demographics ==
Historical population
Census	Pop.	Note	%±
1960	246		—
1970	3,240		1,217.1%
1980	5,651		74.4%
1990	5,866		3.8%
2000	23,152		294.7%
2010	28,965		25.1%
2020	28,982		0.1%
U.S. Decennial Census 2010 2020

=== Racial and ethnic composition ===
Lake in the Hills, Illinois – Racial and ethnic composition Note: the US Census treats Hispanic/Latino as an ethnic category. This table excludes Latinos from the racial categories and assigns them to a separate category. Hispanics/Latinos may be of any race.
Race / Ethnicity (NH = Non-Hispanic)	Pop 2000	Pop 2010	Pop 2020	% 2000	% 2010	% 2020
White alone (NH)	20,324	23,078	20,856	87.79%	79.68%	71.96%
Black or African American alone (NH)	337	546	659	1.46%	1.89%	2.27%
Native American or Alaska Native alone (NH)	27	33	32	0.12%	0.11%	0.11%
Asian alone (NH)	757	1,512	1,637	3.27%	5.22%	5.65%
Pacific Islander alone (NH)	4	12	9	0.02%	0.04%	0.03%
Other race alone (NH)	10	14	88	0.04%	0.05%	0.30%
Mixed race or Multiracial (NH)	231	412	996	1.00%	1.42%	3.44%
Hispanic or Latino (any race)	1,462	3,358	4,705	6.31%	11.59%	16.23%
Total	23,152	28,965	28,982	100.00%	100.00%	100.00%

==== 2024 American Community Survey 5-Year Estimates ====
Racial Makeup of Lake in the Hills (2024): 1. White alone (70.9%); 2. Black alone (2.75%); 3. Native American alone (0.40%); 4. Asian alone (7.17%); 5. Pacific Islander alone (0.00%); 6. Other race (6.17%); 7. Two or more races (12.6%)	Racial Makeup of Lake in the Hills treating Hispanics as a Racial Category (2024); NH=Non-Hispanic: 1. White NH (66.9%); 2. Black NH (1.78%); 3. Native American NH (0.00%); 4. Asian NH (7.17%); 5. Pacific Islander NH (0.00%); 6. Other race NH (0.26%); 7. Two or more races NH (3.60%); 8. Hispanic Any Race (20.3%)	Racial Makeup of Hispanics in Lake in the Hills (2024): 1. White alone (19.9%); 2. Black alone (4.78%); 3. Native American alone (1.98%); 4. Asian alone (0.00%); 5. Pacific Islander alone (0.00%); 6. Other race alone (29.1%); 7. Two or more races (44.2%)

=== 2020 census ===
As of the 2020 census, Lake in the Hills had a population of 28,982. The median age was 37.3 years. 25.6% of residents were under the age of 18 and 9.8% of residents were 65 years of age or older. For every 100 females there were 98.5 males, and for every 100 females age 18 and over there were 97.4 males age 18 and over.

99.9% of residents lived in urban areas, while 0.1% lived in rural areas.

There were 9,848 households in Lake in the Hills, of which 41.5% had children under the age of 18 living in them. Of all households, 62.9% were married-couple households, 12.7% were households with a male householder and no spouse or partner present, and 17.9% were households with a female householder and no spouse or partner present. About 16.7% of all households were made up of individuals and 5.4% had someone living alone who was 65 years of age or older.

There were 10,121 housing units, of which 2.7% were vacant. The homeowner vacancy rate was 0.8% and the rental vacancy rate was 5.1%.

=== 2010 census ===
As of the 2010 census, there were 28,965 people, 9,544 households, and 7,567 families residing in the village. The population density was 2,809.4 inhabitants per square mile (1,084.7/km^{2}). There were 9,885 housing units at an average density of 958.8 per square mile (370.2/km^{2}). The racial makeup of the village (including Hispanics) was 86.72% White, 2% Black or African American, 0.26% Native American, 5.24% Asian, 0.04% Pacific Islander, 3.62% from other races, and 2.13% from two or more races. Hispanic or Latino of any race were 11.59% of the population.

There were 9,544 households, out of which 47.8% had children under the age of 18 living with them, 66.7% were married couples living together, 8.6% had a female householder with no husband present, and 20.7% were non-families. 16% of all households were made up of individuals, and 2.7% had someone living alone who was 65 years of age or older. The average household size was 3.03 and the average family size was 3.44.

In the village, the population was spread out, with 31.6% under the age of 18, 6.7% from 18 to 24, 33.4% from 25 to 44, 23.2% from 45 to 64, and 5.2% who were 65 years of age or older. The median age was 33.9 years. For every 100 females, there were 98.9 males. For every 100 females age 18 and over, there were 96.5 males.

=== Income and poverty ===
For 2015, the median income for a household in the village was $84,300, and the median income for a family was $89,035. Full-time, year-round working males had a median income of $64,725 versus $45,811 for females. The per capita income for the village was $32,957. About 3.9% of families and 5.7% of the population were below the poverty line, including 8.3% of those under age 18 and 2.8% of those age 65 or over.

== Neighborhoods ==
The heart and soul of Lake in the Hills is considered by many to be the collection of older neighborhoods colloquially dubbed the "Old Section". For many L.I.T.H. natives, the Old Section is considered the "true" Lake in the Hills, as it contains the lake and the hills from which the town derives its name. The Old Section is unique for its eclectic appearance, as opposed to the newer neighborhoods more homogeneous tract style. Within the Old Section there are four main neighborhoods. These four neighborhoods are as follows: the Original section, the Indian section, the Tree section, and the Presidents section. All, besides the Original section, derive their names from the street names of the area. So the Presidents section contains streets named after presidents, the Indian section of Indian tribes, and the Tree section of different species of trees. The Original section is dubbed so because it is where most of the early settlement took place. Aside from the village's older section, the village has developed several neighborhoods, especially due to the rise of subdivisions in the village over the past 15 years.

- Prairie Point, located along Cunat Court is a neighborhood on the village's eastern side, just west of Pyott Road. It included 3-story condominium buildings and a neighborhood recreational center and pool.
- Boulder Ridge is a gated community in the central section of town, north of Algonquin Road, south of Miller Road and east of Frank Road. It features homes worth between $400,000 and $1,000,000. It also includes the village's only 18 hole golf course, and an immaculate country club which is a popular spot for banquets. On the west side of Frank Road, is the child development "The Lakes of Boulder Ridge", which offers a 9-hole golf course, scenic setting, and expensive duplex homes.
- Big Sky and Harvest Gate are neighborhoods just west of Randall Road and south of Miller Road, just east of Boulder Ridge. They are some of the village's first subdivisions and were built by the same developer, Town and Country Homes. Woods Creek divides them. The new Lake in the Hills Village Hall, and Lincoln Prairie Elementary School are all located within these neighborhoods.
- Spring Lake Farm (north) is a subdivision south of Miller Road, west of Frank Road. It was also among the village's first subdivisions, built c. early 1990s, by Sundance Homes and Americana Homes. It includes both single-family and multi-family homes.

== Education ==
The village is served by four school districts. Consolidated School District 158 serves a majority of the village, covering its densely populated western half. School District 300 serves the older sections of town on the eastern side, and Elementary School District 47 and Community High School District 155 serve the a small portion of the central sections of the village.

=== Elementary schools ===
Elementary Schools serving Lake in the Hills include:

- Lake in the Hills Elementary School serves students residing on the eastern side of town
- Lincoln Prairie Elementary School serves students residing in District 300 boundaries in the central sections of town near Randall Road.
- Glacier Ridge Elementary School, Canterbury Elementary School, Woods Creek Elementary School and Indian Prairie Elementary School (in Crystal Lake, Illinois) serves students residing in District 47 boundaries in the central sections of town along Miller Road.
- May Chesak and Hannah Martin Elementary Schools serve students residing in District 158 boundaries on the western side of town, along the Lakewood Road corridor. They are located in the Reed Road Campus.
- Mackeben and Marion Conley Elementary Schools serve students residing in District 158 boundaries on the southwest side of town (generally the Bellchase neighborhood). They are located on the Square Barn Road Campus in Algonquin, IL

=== Middle schools ===
Middle Schools serving Lake in the Hills include:

- Westfield Community School in Algonquin, IL serves students residing in District 300 boundaries.
- Richard F. Bernotas Middle School and Leon J. Lundahl Middle School in Crystal Lake, IL serves students residing in District 47 boundaries.
- Henry Marlowe Middle School in Lake in the Hills serves students residing in District 158 boundaries north of Algonquin Road and west of Lakewood Road.
- Bernice Heinemann Middle School in Algonquin, IL serves students residing in District 158 boundaries south of Algonquin Road and east of Lakewood Road.

=== High schools ===
High Schools serving Lake in the Hills include:

- Huntley High School in Huntley, IL serves students residing in District 158 boundaries
- Harry D. Jacobs High School in Algonquin, IL serves students residing in District 300 boundaries
- Crystal Lake South High School and Crystal Lake Central High School in Crystal Lake, IL serves students residing in District 155 boundaries

All four high schools are in the Fox Valley Conference and are major rivals of each other.

=== Community colleges ===
McHenry County College in Crystal Lake and Elgin Community College in Elgin are the community colleges that serve the village.

=== Libraries ===
Huntley Area Public Library serves residents in the western sections of the village while Algonquin Area Public Library District serves residents in the eastern sections of the village.

== Transportation ==
- Pace provides bus service on Route 550 along Randall Road connecting Lake in the Hills to Crystal Lake, Elgin, and other destinations.
- The village of Lake in the Hills owns and operates Lake in the Hills Airport, a general aviation airport serving the greater McHenry County area. It is located on Pyott Road in the far northern reaches of the village.
- Randall Road, a major four-lane county highway, is the primary north–south highway in the Village. It is known as the major divider separating the old part (or "East Side" of Lake in the Hills) from the newer part (or "West Side") of the Village.
- Algonquin Road is the primary east–west artery in the Village. It is also the dividing line separating Lake in the Hills from nearby Algonquin.

== Notable people ==
- Joe Becker, musician
- Josh Caterer, singer-songwriter, guitarist, and frontman for the Smoking Popes
