= Galleria Center =

Algonquin Galleria
- Location: Algonquin, Illinois, United States
- Opened: 2006
- Developer: Mid-America Development Partners
- Num. of stores: 10 (currently)
- Num. of anchor tenants: 4 (currently)
- Floor area: 260,000 sq ft (24,000 m^{2}). (GLA) (phase 1)
- Floors: 1
- Parking: 1,450 spaces (phase 1)
- Public transit: Pace
- Website: www.midamdevelopment.com

The Algonquin Galleria Center is an outdoor shopping mall at the southeast corner of Randall Road and County Line Road in Algonquin, Illinois. Plans were for 1,000,000 sq ft (93,000 m^{2}) of space with 150 stores and restaurants set over 110 acres (0.45 km^{2}), but were never really completed. Similar to the existing Algonquin Commons across the street, it will be an outdoor mall, or lifestyle center, with stores spread out in multiple buildings, allowing shoppers to drive up to their favorite store. The Galleria is intended to be an upscale mall, not a typical power center it features; high quality aesthetics, striking architecture, one of the largest agglomerations of furniture retailers in the area, a cluster of restaurants, specialty stores, and a Bowlero bowling facility to serve as the center's entertainment complex.

The center was to be built in three major phases over a period of five to seven years. Phase I is the only one completed The project was developed by Oak Brook-based Mid-America Development Partners, LLC.

The Algonquin Galleria and Algonquin Commons combine to form the second largest retail complex in the state of Illinois.

== See also ==
- Esplanade (Algonquin)
