= Lakewood, Illinois =

- Village
- Village of Lakewood
- Logo
- Motto: "Quality Living in a Natural Setting"
- Location of Lakewood in McHenry County, Illinois.
- Coordinates: 42°13′56″N 88°24′00″W
- Country: United States
- State: Illinois
- County: McHenry
- Townships: Algonquin, Dorr, Grafton
- Founded: July 10, 1933

Area
  - Total: 4.89 sq mi (12.66 km^{2})
  - Land: 4.59 sq mi (11.88 km^{2})
  - Water: 0.30 sq mi (0.78 km^{2})
- Elevation: 889 ft (271 m)

Population (2020)
  - Total: 4,283
  - Density: 933.7/sq mi (360.52/km^{2})
- Time zone: UTC-6 (CST)
  - Summer (DST): UTC-5 (CDT)
- ZIP code: 60014
- Area code: 815
- FIPS code: 17-41651
- GNIS feature ID: 2398390
- Website: www.village.lakewood.il.us

The Village of Lakewood is a village in McHenry County, Illinois, United States. It was incorporated as a village on July 10, 1933. Per the 2020 census, the population was 4,283.

== Geography ==
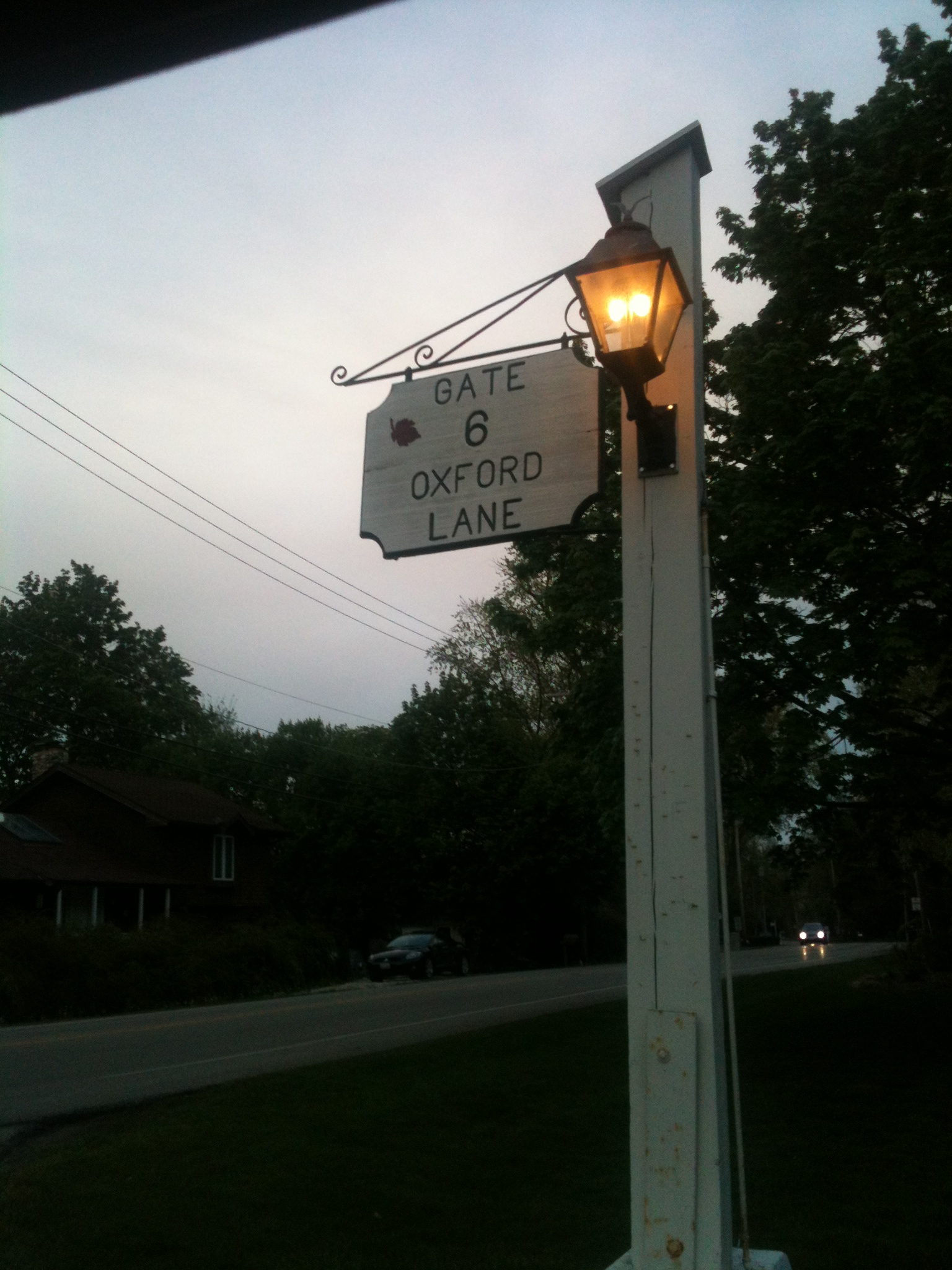
Gate 6 sign on South Lake Shore Drive

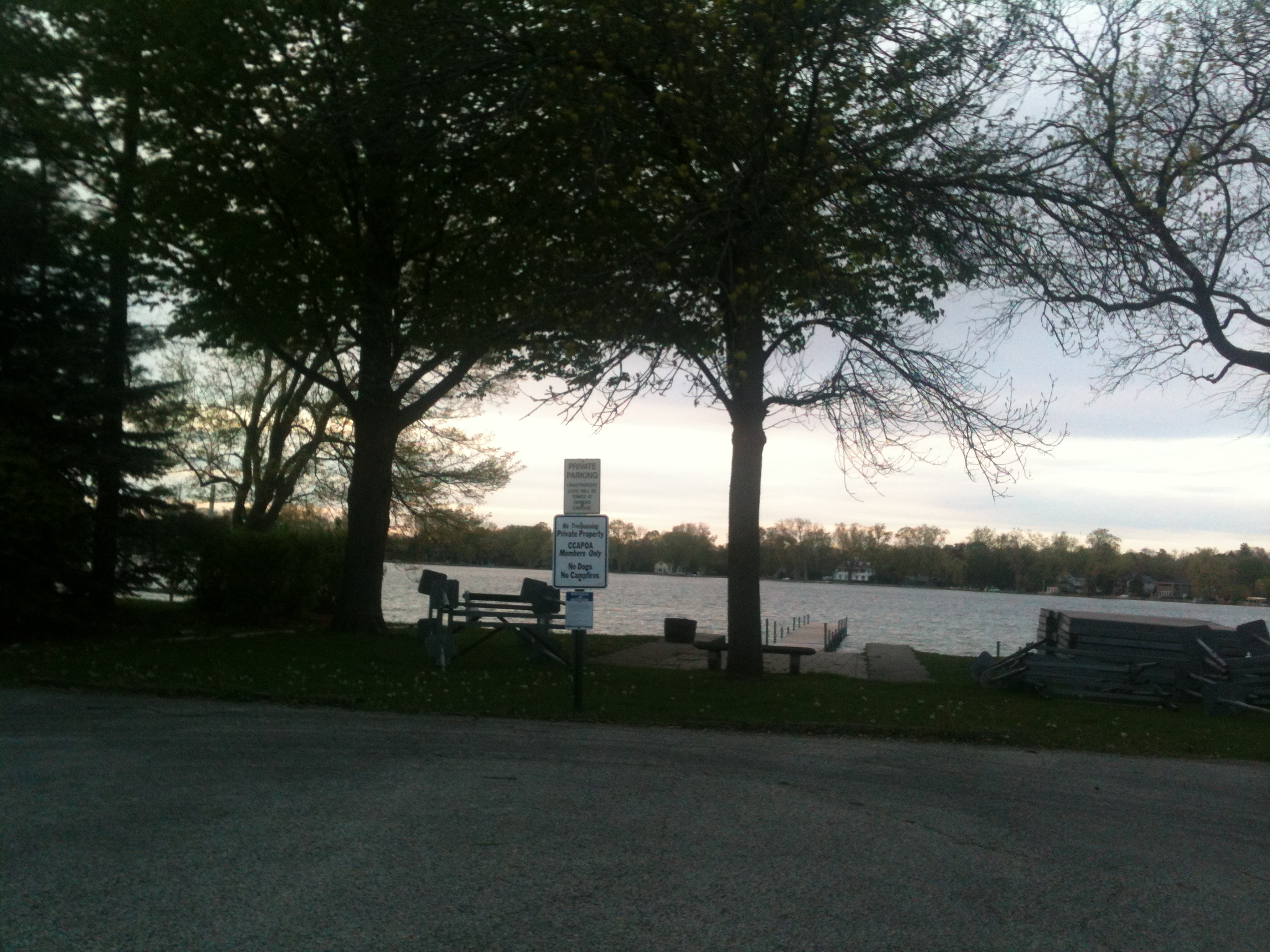
CCAPOA Gate 3 Beach of Crystal Lake

The Village at Lakewood is located in McHenry County in the state of Illinois. The Village shares its boundaries with the City of Crystal Lake, Village of Lake in the Hills, Village of Huntley, and City of Woodstock.

The Village covers just under 4 square miles (10 km^{2}). There are about 650 acres (2.6 km^{2}) of open space, which equals about 3/4 acre per household. There are 6 lakes, including Crystal Lake which is situated partially in the Village and partially in the City of Crystal Lake, Illinois. The Village is home to two golf courses and several natural areas or wetlands, including the Kishwaukee Fen Nature Preserve. There are also a number of public and private parks and beaches within the Village, as well as walking and bicycle paths and permanent open spaces in the newer subdivisions. Lakewood's recreational areas are West Beach, Crystal Lake, and a number of parks that dot the area.

Small parks, beaches, and boat docks along Crystal Lake's South Shore are private and maintained for use by members of the Country Club Additions Property Owners Association (CCAPOA). This is a homeowners association-like entity for Lakewood houses from approximately Country Club Road (named for Crystal Lake Country Club just to the south) and extending to the south lakeshore. Roads in this lakeside area have decorative posts on the corner of streets intersecting Lake Shore Drive and are called "Gates", such as "Gate 7". The CCAPOA parks take their names from these gates, so a lakeside park would be called "Gate 7 Beach" locally. Lakewood is located immediately adjacent to Crystal Lake, Illinois.

According to the 2010 census, Lakewood has a total area of 3.974 square miles (10.29 km^{2}), of which 3.67 square miles (9.51 km^{2}) (or 92.35%) is land and 0.304 square miles (0.79 km^{2}) (or 7.65%) is water.

== Demographics ==
=== Racial and ethnic composition ===
Lakewood village, Illinois – Racial and ethnic composition Note: the US Census treats Hispanic/Latino as an ethnic category. This table excludes Latinos from the racial categories and assigns them to a separate category. Hispanics/Latinos may be of any race.
Race / Ethnicity (NH = Non-Hispanic)	Pop 2000	Pop 2010	Pop 2020	% 2000	% 2010	% 2020
White alone (NH)	2,210	3,460	3,699	94.57%	90.79%	86.36%
Black or African American alone (NH)	18	44	25	0.77%	1.15%	0.58%
Native American or Alaska Native alone (NH)	4	8	7	0.17%	0.21%	0.16%
Asian alone (NH)	36	133	153	1.54%	3.49%	3.57%
Pacific Islander alone (NH)	0	0	0	0.00%	0.00%	0.00%
Other race alone (NH)	0	2	9	0.00%	0.05%	0.21%
Mixed race or Multiracial (NH)	14	44	178	0.60%	1.15%	4.16%
Hispanic or Latino (any race)	55	120	212	2.35%	3.15%	4.95%
Total	2,337	3,811	4,283	100.00%	100.00%	100.00%

=== 2020 census ===
As of the 2020 census, Lakewood had a population of 4,283. The median age was 43.7 years. 25.4% of residents were under the age of 18 and 15.9% of residents were 65 years of age or older. For every 100 females there were 104.0 males, and for every 100 females age 18 and over there were 100.9 males age 18 and over.

93.7% of residents lived in urban areas, while 6.3% lived in rural areas.

There were 1,475 households in Lakewood, of which 37.1% had children under the age of 18 living in them. Of all households, 73.2% were married-couple households, 9.2% were households with a male householder and no spouse or partner present, and 14.0% were households with a female householder and no spouse or partner present. About 14.7% of all households were made up of individuals and 7.5% had someone living alone who was 65 years of age or older.

There were 1,524 housing units, of which 3.2% were vacant. The homeowner vacancy rate was 1.7% and the rental vacancy rate was 8.9%.

=== 2000 census ===
As of the 2000 census, there were 2,337 people, 815 households, and 705 families residing in the village. The population density was 756.0 inhabitants per square mile (291.9/km^{2}). There were 871 housing units at an average density of 281.8 per square mile (108.8/km^{2}). The racial makeup of the village was 96.11% White, 0.77% African American, 0.17% Native American, 1.54% Asian, 0.68% from other races, and 0.73% from two or more races. Hispanic or Latino of any race were 2.35% of the population.

There were 815 households, out of which 39.0% had children under the age of 18 living with them, 80.5% were married couples living together, 5.4% had a female householder with no husband present, and 13.4% were non-families. 11.5% of all households were made up of individuals, and 4.8% had someone living alone who was 65 years of age or older. The average household size was 2.87 and the average family size was 3.09.

In the village, the population was spread out, with 27.3% under the age of 18, 4.6% from 18 to 24, 26.2% from 25 to 44, 31.8% from 45 to 64, and 10.1% who were 65 years of age or older. The median age was 41 years. For every 100 females, there were 96.2 males. For every 100 females age 18 and over, there were 93.5 males.

The median income for a household in the village was $111,172, and the median income for a family was $116,893. Males had a median income of $89,749 versus $40,341 for females. The per capita income for the village was $44,579. About 1.1% of families and 1.7% of the population were below the poverty line, including 3.3% of those under age 18 and 1.5% of those age 65 or over.

Historical population
Census	Pop.	Note	%±
1940	125		—
1950	393		214.4%
1960	635		61.6%
1970	782		23.1%
1980	1,254		60.4%
1990	1,609		28.3%
2000	2,337		45.2%
2010	3,811		63.1%
2020	4,283		12.4%
U.S. Decennial Census; 2010 2020

== Education ==
Lakewood is primarily served by Crystal Lake Community Consolidated School District 47 and Community High School District 155, specifically South Elementary School for those east of Huntley Road, West Elementary School for those west of Huntley Road, Richard F. Bernotas Middle School and Crystal Lake Central High School. The Turnberry Meadows subdivision is served by Huntley's Consolidated School District 158, specifically Chesak Elementary School, Martin Elementary School, Marlowe Middle School and Huntley High School. Turnberry Country Club is used by Crystal Lake Central golf teams for home games.

== See also ==
- Huntley, Illinois
- Crystal Lake, Illinois
- Lake in the Hills, Illinois
- Woodstock, Illinois
