= Lake in the Hills Airport =

Small Regional Airport

Coordinates: 42°12′24″N 088°19′23″W

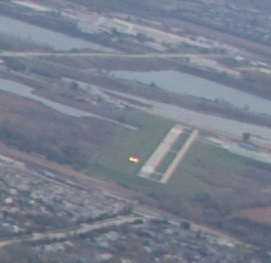
- IATA: none; ICAO: none; FAA LID: 3CK

Summary
- Airport type: Public
- Owner: Village of Lake in the Hills
- Location: Lake in the Hills, Illinois
- Elevation AMSL: 888 ft / 271 m
- Website: www.lith.org/airport

Map
- Location of airport in Illinois 3CK (the United States)

Runways
Direction	Length		Surface
Direction	ft	m	Surface
8/26	3,801	1,159	Asphalt

Statistics
- Aircraft operations (2016): 34,000
- Based aircraft (2017): 101
- Source: FAA and airport website

Lake in the Hills Airport (FAA LID: 3CK) is a public airport located at 8407 Pyott Road in Lake in the Hills, a village in McHenry County, Illinois, United States. The airport is owned by the Village of Lake in the Hills and is located 38 miles (61 km) northwest of the central business district of Chicago. It is a designated Federal Aviation Administration reliever airport for Chicago's O'Hare International Airport.

== History ==
Lake in the Hills Airport was founded in 1957. Then called Crystal Lake Airport, it was privately owned. The Village of Lake in the Hills acquired the airport in 1984.

=== Redevelopment program ===
Pyott Road, to the east of the airport, was relocated to create an improved Runway Safety Area. A new parallel taxiway, capable of operating as a temporary runway, has also been built in addition to a larger primary aircraft parking apron, and a new general aviation terminal will be constructed. Improvements will also be made to drainage, utilities and support facilities.

In 2014, the airport built a new fuel farm and moved old fuel tanks that were too close to the runway, a project that cost about $760,000. In July 2016, construction began for the final phase of the airport's improvement project. In the project, the former airport office building was demolished to make way for a new taxiway, in order to move it away from the runway, which is being redone and widened from 50 feet (15 m) to 75 feet (23 m) to meet Federal Aviation Administration standards. The taxiway was completed in November 2016, and the entire project is expected to be completed in 2022, with the runway expansion expected to cost $5 million.

Because of continued success in advancing this safety improvement program, the airport was named 2010 Reliever Airport of the Year in Illinois by the Illinois Division of Aeronautics. The airport also won this distinction in 2019.

== Facilities and aircraft ==
Lake in the Hills Airport covers an area of 72 acres (29 ha) at an elevation of 888 ft (271 m). It has one runway designated 8/26 with a 3,801 x 50 ft (1,159 x 15 m) asphalt pavement. The airport is uncontrolled and is open to the public.

For the 12-month period ending August 30, 2019, the airport had 34,000 aircraft operations, an average of 93 per day; all were general aviation. In January 2017, there were 101 aircraft based at this airport: 92 single-engine, 7 multi-engine and 4 jet.

FBO services are provided by the Village of Lake in the Hills, offering both full and self-service 100LL and Jet A fuel.

Flight training and supplies provided by Blue Skies Flying Services. Pilot Flight Training Courses, another flight training school, opened its doors in March 2017.

A courtesy vehicle is available at the airport for use during business hours.

== Ground transportation ==
While no public transit service is provided directly to the airport, Pace provides bus service nearby.

== Accidents and incidents ==
- On September 3, 2007, a Yakovlev Yak 52 impacted terrain shortly after takeoff from Lake in the Hills' Runway 26. Witnesses reported the aircraft entered a "violent" left turn before the engine "gave out," and the aircraft descended. Both people on board were killed. Ultimately, the NTSB was unable to determine a reason for the crash.
- On May 3, 2012, a Beechcraft Bonanza 35 crashed a half mile east of the airport. Both passengers on board were killed.
- On June 8, 2017, a Beechcraft Baron landed with its landing gear up. Neither person on board was injured.

== See also ==
- List of airports in Illinois
