= Crystal Lake Community Consolidated School District 47 =

School district in Illinois, United States

Address
- 300 Commerce Drive Crystal Lake, McHenry County, Illinois, 60014; United States

District information
- Type: Public
- Motto: Empowering All Students: Learners Today - Leaders Tomorrow
- Grades: PreK-8
- Superintendent: Dr. Kathy J. Hinz
- Governing agency: Illinois State Board of Education
- Schools: 12
- NCES District ID: 1711350

Students and staff
- Students: 7109
- Teachers: 561.86 (FTE)
- Staff: 545.72 (FTE)
- Student–teacher ratio: 12.65

Other information
- Website: www.d47.org

Crystal Lake Community Consolidated School District 47 is a school district containing elementary and middle schools. The district serves Crystal Lake, Lakewood, as well as parts of Lake in the Hills, Cary, Woodstock, Huntley, Bull Valley, and McHenry.

District 47 has an area of 44 square miles and a population of about 7,800 students from Pre-K through 8th grade, as well as about 1,100 staff and administrators. The current Superintendent is Dr. Kathy Hinz.

== History ==
Former logo of District 47

The creation of District 47 took place during the late 19th and early 20th centuries.

== Schools ==
In District 47, there are nine elementary schools, three middle schools, and one early childhood center.

=== Elementary schools ===
- North Elementary School, established 1954
- South Elementary School, established 1952
- West Elementary School, established 1963
- Husmann Elementary School, established 1949 (as Central Elementary School)
- Canterbury Elementary School, established 1971
- Coventry Elementary School, established 1967
- Woods Creek Elementary School, established 1997
- Indian Prairie Elementary School, established 1991
- Glacier Ridge Elementary School, established 2001

=== Middle schools ===
==== Richard F. Bernotas Middle School ====
Richard F. Bernotas Middle School, also referred to as Bernotas Middle School or simply RBMS, was established in 1969. Originally it was North Junior High, in 2002, it was dedicated to Richard F. Bernotas who served the district from 1971-2002. The school was the second middle school in the district. In the beginning the school district headquarters housed here until 1987.

Renovation of old office space constructed new classrooms in the basement of the school where the offices used to be. After that more classrooms were built on the north side of the school in 1991 and more in 2006 with the addition the new cafeteria. Final additions to the east side of the building concluded in 2018 for life skills classes.

There are 800 students attending Bernotas Middle school. Bernotas' sports teams go under the "Bernotas Vikings". The school's mascot is Thor, represented by a viking. The school colors are navy blue and gold. Unique to the other middle schools in the district, RBMS has its unique school song.

==== Leon J. Lundahl Middle School ====
Leon J. Lundahl Middle School, also referred to as Lundahl Middle School, was established in 1959 as South Junior High. The name was switched to Lundahl Middle School after the retirement of Leon J. Lundahl, the superintendent in 1966. Lundahl Middle School was the first school to be named after someone at the time.

In 1974, a new addition, including a new gymnasium, learning center, locker room area, and science complex, was opened. Mr. Richard Carlstedt became principal in 1989. In 1990-91, a new north-end classroom addition, cafeteria, locker room area, and second gymnasium were added to the Lundahl campus. The school became an accredited middle school in the spring of 1995, and its name was officially changed to Lundahl Middle School Campus for the opening of the 1996-97 school year.

Lundahl Middle School's colors are purple and gold, and they compete in athletics as the Lundahl Lions, female-oriented sports teams referred to as the Lady Lions. Lundahl Middle School's mascot is a lion, whose name is Leo. Leo comes from Leon J. Lundahl, the retiring superintendent in 1966.

==== Hannah Beardsley Middle School ====
Hannah Beardsley Middle School opened in 1996, the most recent middle school in Crystal Lake. Its namesake, Hannah Beardsley, was the first school teacher in the Crystal Lake area. The first principal of Hannah Beardsley Middle School was Ron Ludwig.

Similarly to Bernotas, HBMS was opened to accommodate Crystal Lake's burgeoning population, which had been fueled mainly by an influx of middle-class families from Chicago during the 1990s. When it first opened, Beardsley was already close to capacity. Rising enrollment necessitated the construction of an additional wing of classrooms on the building's upper floor, completed in 2000. Present enrollment is 830 students in grades 6 through 8. Beardsley's sports teams compete as the Beardsley Bears, and its school colors are blue and orange.
