= Huntley High School =

Public secondary school in Illinois, US

Location
- 13719 Harmony Road; Huntley, Illinois 60142; United States; 42°9′44″N 88°27′54″W

Information
- Type: Public secondary
- Motto: "It's a Great day to be a Red Raider"
- School district: Consolidated School District 158
- Superintendent: Jessica Lombard
- Principal: Marcus Belin
- Faculty: 317
- Teaching staff: 179.20 (FTE)
- Grades: 9–12
- Enrollment: 2,804 (2024-2025)
- Student to teacher ratio: 15.65
- Campus: Suburban
- Colors: Red, white and black
- Mascot: Red Raiders
- Newspaper: The Voice
- Yearbook: The Harmony
- Website: hhs.huntley158.org

Huntley High School is a public high school in Huntley, Illinois, United States. The catchment area includes Consolidated School District 158, which includes all of Huntley as well as parts of Lake in the Hills, Algonquin, and other surrounding communities and rural areas.

== The Building ==
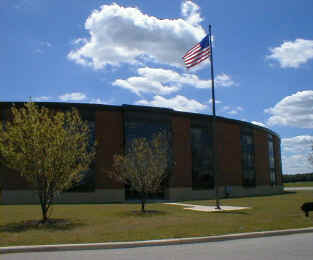
The front of Huntley High School, built in 1997, before the additions.

The current building, located at 13719 Harmony Road in Huntley, was constructed in 1997, and at the time was the school district's first new building in about 30 years. It was originally designed as a middle-high school, with a shared cafeteria and library in the center of the building. The original high school building, located on Mill Street in Huntley, was built in the 1960s and only featured about a dozen classrooms and outdated facilities. In the 1990s, the district's enrollment increased with suburban growth, and the school facilities needed to be expanded. After the new building was built in 1997, the old building served grades 4–5, before finally being converted into a recreational center when it was sold to the Huntley Park District in the early 2000s.

=== Additions ===
In 1999, the building's first major addition was a 12 classroom wing on the west end designed for temporary usage for grades 5 through 8. In 2005, when the new elementary and middle schools were built, this wing served the high school's mathematics, foreign language, and social studies classes.

In 2002, substantial additions were made to both the west and east sides of the building. On the west end, was a second wing which created a new main office for the high school, special education classrooms, high school science labs and classrooms, and eighth grade classrooms. A four-classroom wing housing health classrooms and a computer lab connected the two western wings and completely surrounded the west gym (middle school gym).

The east addition provided the high school with a much larger gym, art and music classrooms, a 700-seat auditorium, student facilities and administrative offices.

In 2005, upon completion of the district's two new middle schools, the use of the building was allocated to high school classrooms and services only. Space has already been dedicated for an additional high school at the Square Barn Road Campus in Algonquin, Illinois.

=== Athletic complex ===
The school's athletic complex includes a football field and track, Field house with track and basketball courts, wrestling mat room, administrative and maintenance buildings, three softball fields, two baseball fields, ten tennis courts, a practice football field, and two soccer fields in front.

=== Performing Arts Center ===
The Performing Arts Center was built as part of an addition to the school in 2002 and features approximately 700 seats. The tone of the theater is dominated by red and black, the school's colors. In addition to the stage and seating areas, the theater also features an orchestra pit, backstage rooms, and balconies. The center hosts high school plays, middle school plays, musical performances, performances from outside groups, assemblies, presentations, and award ceremonies.

== Mascot ==
Until 2002, Huntley High School's mascot had been the Huntley Redskins. In the late 1990s, the school district faced threats of legal action by Native American groups claiming the mascot was a racial slur and in 2002 its use was abolished. A new mascot was adopted in 2002 as a closer option to the original mascot. The Huntley High School mascot is now a Red Raider, naming them, the "Huntley Red Raiders".

== Student life ==
Students enjoy a variety of activities.

=== Academics ===
According to School District 158's Report Card (for the year 2009), Huntley High School exceeds to State of Illinois average in most academic areas.

The average ACT composite score at Huntley High School was 22.4 out of 36 in 2009, exceeding the average in Illinois.

The school's Prairie State Achievement Examination (PSAE) scores were all above the state average in 2009. In the reading category, Huntley had an average of 160 compared to the state average of 157. In the science category, Huntley's average was 163 while the state had an average of 157. As for the mathematics category, Huntley's average was 160 compared to the state average of 157.

Huntley High School's graduation rate is 98.4%, exceeding the state's average of 78% in 2009.

=== Activities and athletics ===
Huntley High School offers a number of sports and extra-curricular activities:

- Orchesis
- Boys Baseball
- Boys and Girls Basketball
- Boys and Girls Bowling
- Cheerleading
- Chess Team
- Boys and Girls Cross Country
- Football
- Gaming Team
- Boys and Girls Golf
- Boys and Girls Lacrosse
- Poms
- Boys and Girls Soccer
- Girls Softball
- Boys and Girls Tennis
- Track and Field
- Boys and Girls Volleyball
- Boys and Girls Swimming
- Wrestling
- After School Choir
- Art Club
- Band
- Buddies Club
- Color Guard
- Competitive eSports
- Computer Club
- Contest Theatre
- Creative Writing Club
- Culinary Club
- Orchesis Dance Program
- Dungeons and Dragons Club
- Drone Club
- Environmental Club
- Fishing Club
- Film Club
- Frosh-Soph One Acts
- Gender and Sexuality Alliance (GSA)
- Jazz Band
- Journalism
- Hope Squad
- HOSA (Future Healthcare Professionals) Medical Club
- Investing and Economics Club
- Leos Club
- Math Team
- Mock Trial
- Model United Nations
- National Honor Society
- Musicals
- Plays
- Philosophy Club
- RAD (Recognizing American Diversity) Student Committee
- Raider Nation
- Red Raider Robotics
- Scholastic Bowl Team
- Silver Cord
- SnowRaiders (Ski/Snowboarding) (One of the school's biggest clubs)
- Spanish Honor Society
- Speech Team
- Student Council (STUCO)
- Technical Theatre Club
- Thespian Show
- Thespian Troupe
- TV Production Club
- Yearbook
- Zoology Club

Huntley softball won the IHSA Class 4A state title in 2019, the first state title in school history. Huntley's Journalism team won back-to-back IHSA state championships in 2021 and 2022.

Huntley girls track won the IHSA Class 3A girls track state title in 2023.

For a number of years, Huntley High School was part of the Big Northern Conference which comprised twelve small-town schools in North Central Illinois. As Huntley High School's enrollment approached 1,000 in the early 2000s, it became class AA and joined the much larger suburban Fox Valley Conference in 2002.

== Notable alumni ==
- Amanze Egekeze, professional basketball player
- Rachel Recchia, American reality television personality
