= Consolidated School District 158 =

School district in Illinois, United States

The old logo of Consolidated School District 158

Community Consolidated School District 158 is a school district in Illinois. The district serves some nearly 9,500 students living in Huntley as well as western portions of Lake in the Hills and Algonquin and surrounding areas. The district employs over 1,400 staff members. The school district has transformed itself from a one elementary/one high school district as recently as 1996 to a district that as of 2006 boasts 5 elementary schools, 2 middle schools, and 1 high school on three campuses district-wide.

== Controversy/Incidents ==
The school district has encountered plenty of controversies and incidents in recent years, including:

- In February 2017, a Huntley High School Student distributed highly racist pamphlets on campus grounds. The student did not face criminal charges.
- In October 2017, hate crime and disorderly conduct charges were filed against a Marlowe Middle School student. Threatening and racist videos were posted on social media, but the situation was rectified without harm being done.

== Schools ==
Harmony Road Campus in Huntley

- Huntley High School (grades 9–12)
- Leggee Elementary School (grades K-5)

Reed Road Campus in Lake in the Hills

- Henry Marlowe Middle School (grades 6–8)

Henry Marlowe Middle School was opened in 2005. Its school mascot is the Mustang, and the school colors are black, white, and silver.

- Hannah Martin Elementary School (grades 3–5)
- May Chesak Elementary School (grades K-2)

Square Barn Road Campus in Algonquin

- District 158 Administration/Transportation Building
- Bernice Heineman Middle School (grades 6–8)

Bernice Heineman Middle School was opened in 2005 after Huntley Middle School closed. Its mascot is the Hawk, and the school colors are silver and blue.

- Marion Conley Elementary School (grades 3–5)

The school mascot is a coyote.

- Mackeben Elementary School (grades K-2)

== See also ==
- Fox Valley Conference
- List of school districts in Illinois
- Huntley, Illinois
- Algonquin, Illinois
- Lake in the Hills, Illinois
