= Algonquin Area Public Library District =

Library district in Illinois

The Algonquin Area Public Library District has two library facilities located in the village of Algonquin, Illinois. Covering approximately 14 square miles (36 km^{2}), the Algonquin Area Public Library District encompasses roughly half of the village of Algonquin, a large part of the village of Lake in the Hills and a small portion of the village of Cary.

== Locations ==
- Main library: 2600 Harnish Drive, Algonquin, Illinois 60102 42°09′44″N 88°20′46″W
- Eastgate branch: 115 Eastgate Drive, Algonquin, Illinois 60102 42°09′46″N 88°17′01″W

== Statistics ==
- Service Area Population: 40,809
- Number of Registered Cardholders: 23,564
- Budget: $6,894,242 (2011-2012 Fiscal Year)
- Collection Size: 219,081 items (Main Library) 61,291 items (Eastgate Branch)

== District boundaries ==
A library district is a separate, independent unit of government with dedicated property tax revenue that is approved by voters. At the time the district was created in 1962, the Algonquin Area Public Library District encompassed all residents of Algonquin and surrounding areas of Lake in the Hills and Cary. As the population grew, the Village of Algonquin ultimately expanded beyond the boundaries of the Algonquin Area Public Library District. As a result, residents of the following communities may be serviced by other library districts:

- Residents of Algonquin who live outside the boundaries of the Algonquin Area Public Library District may belong to the Fox River Valley Public Library District, the Barrington Area Public Library District, the Huntley Area Public Library, or the Cary Area Public Library District.
- Residents of Lake in the Hills who live outside the boundaries of the Algonquin Area Public Library District may belong to either the Huntley Area Public Library or the Cary Area Public Library District.
- Residents of Cary who live outside the boundaries of the Algonquin Area Public Library District may belong to the Cary Area Public Library District.

== History ==
=== Founding ===
The Library was founded on February 23, 1921, by the Algonquin Women's Club, who sought and gained approval from the Village of Algonquin to install shelves in the council room of the Algonquin Village Hall for a public library. Three years later, on April 15, 1924, Algonquin residents voted to support the library with tax dollars. The Algonquin Public Library functioned as a village supported library until 1962, when voters approved a referendum for the library to reorganize as the Algonquin Area Public Library District.

=== Expansion ===
The Algonquin Area Public Library continued to house its collection within the Algonquin Village Hall until a new library building was built on Eastgate Drive. The land for the library building was purchased in April 1974 for $37,000. The next year, voters approved the sale of bonds to build a new 16,000 sq. ft. library for $595,000. Thirteen months after breaking ground, the Board of Trustees held an open house at the new library on Eastgate drive on March 27, 1977.

In November 1998, a $7.8 million bond issue was passed for the construction of another library facility on the west side of town to meet the demands of a growing population. The new library building on Harnish Drive, also known as the Main Library, opened to the public on October 15, 2001. The building on Eastgate Drive was renovated and reopened as a branch library on November 17, 2002, following a tax rate increase approved by voters in April 2001.

== Innovation ==
=== E-books ===
Algonquin Area Public Library District was an early adopter of e-books. In August 1999, they became one of the first libraries in the country to circulate e-books using dedicated e-book readers. Four Rocket eBook Readers were initially purchased in May 1999 with $2000 from an Innovation Grant issued by the former North Suburban Library System. By August 2000, a total of eight Rocket eBook Readers were in circulation. As the e-book market matured and consumer devices became more affordable, the Library shifted its model of e-book service from circulating devices to providing downloadable e-book content. The Rocket eBook Readers were eventually retired. One of the Readers was donated to the Algonquin Historic Commission, while the others were sold by the Friends of the Algonquin Area Public Library District in their Spring Book Sale.

=== Radio-frequency Identification ===
The Algonquin Area Public Library District was also an early adopter of Radio-frequency identification (RFID). When the Harnish Drive facility opened in October 2001, the Library installed the Checkpoint Intelligent Library System (ILS), an RFID-based materials handling and security system. One year later, in November 2002, the Eastgate Branch facility reopened with the Checkpoint ILS RFID in place.

=== Mobile application ===
The most recent innovation at the Algonquin Area Public Library District is the development of a mobile app, funded by the Friends of the Algonquin Area Public Library District. The app is compatible with all web-enabled phones with clients available for iPhone, Android, BlackBerry, J2ME, Palm OS, Symbian S60, and Windows Mobile. This service went live for all platforms on October 7, 2011.

== Awards ==
=== HAPLR Top 10 Library (2010) ===
Ranked 10th in the nation among libraries with similar populations according to the 2010 edition of Hennen's American Public Library Ratings (HAPLR Index). The rankings measure inputs such as expenditure per capita and outputs including cost per circulation and number of visits per capita, among others.

=== America's Star Libraries (2011) ===
Recognized as a three star library by the 2011 Library Journal Index of Public Library Service. The library ranked 24th in the nation and 7th in the state of Illinois for libraries with similar budgets. The ranking system is based on a formula that includes library visits, circulation, program attendance and public Internet use.
