= Crystal Lake, Illinois =

- City
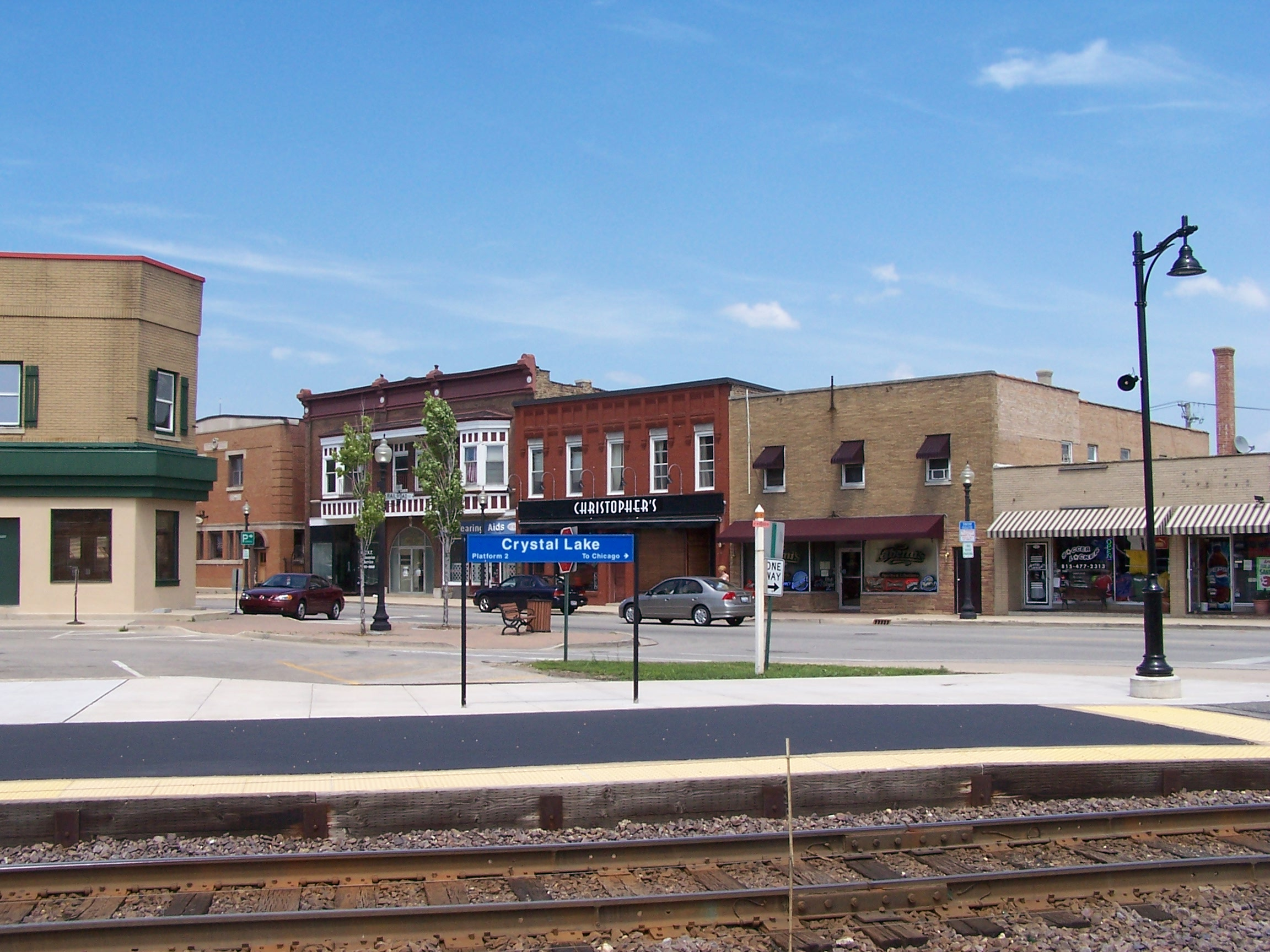
- Downtown Crystal Lake

- Flag
- Motto: A Good Place To Live
- Interactive map of Crystal Lake, Illinois
- Location within Chicago metropolitan area Location within Illinois Location within the United States
- Coordinates: 42°14′45″N 88°22′50″W
- Country: United States
- State: Illinois
- County: McHenry
- Townships: Algonquin, Dorr, Nunda, Grafton
- Adoption of city charter: September 23, 1914

Government
  - Type: Council–manager
  - Mayor: Haig Haleblian

Area
  - Total: 19.53 sq mi (50.59 km^{2})
  - Land: 18.92 sq mi (49.00 km^{2})
  - Water: 0.61 sq mi (1.59 km^{2})
- Elevation: 899 ft (274 m)

Population (2020)
  - Total: 40,269
  - Density: 2,128.6/sq mi (821.87/km^{2})
- Time zone: UTC−6 (CST)
  - Summer (DST): UTC−5 (CDT)
- ZIP Codes: 60012, 60014, 60039
- Area codes: 815/779
- FIPS code: 17-17887
- GNIS feature ID: 2393685
- Median home value: $332,423 (2023)
- Website: www.crystallake.org

Crystal Lake is a city in McHenry County, Illinois, United States. Named after a lake 1.6 miles (2.6 km) southwest of the city's downtown, Crystal Lake is 45 miles (72 km) northwest of Chicago. The population was 40,269 as of the 2020 census. Crystal Lake is the most populous city in McHenry County, part of the Chicago metropolitan area.

== History ==
=== Founding ===
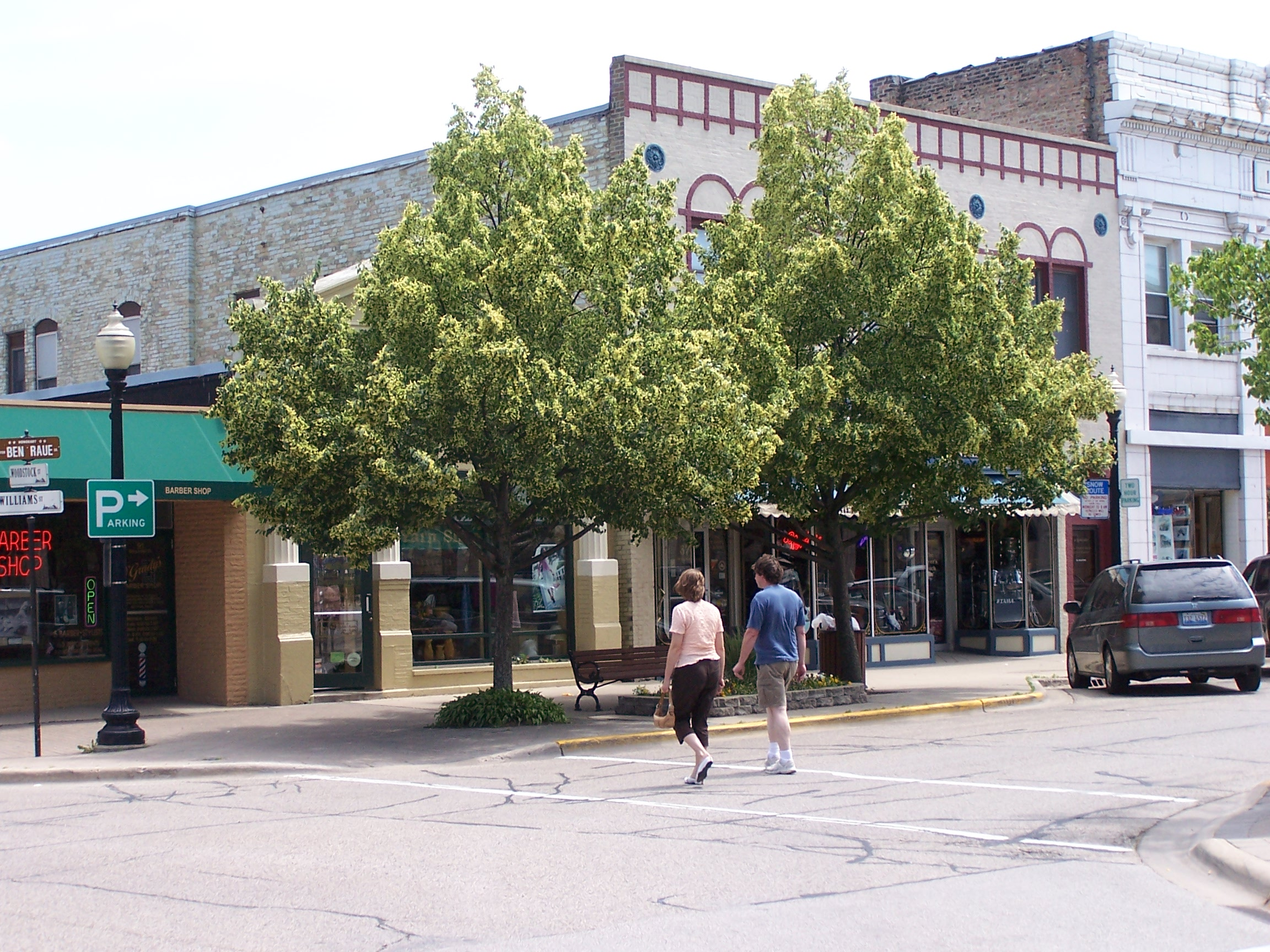
Woodstock and Williams Streets in downtown Crystal Lake

The City of Crystal Lake traces its origins to two communities established in the 1800s. Those communities were generally known as Nunda and Crystal Lake. In 1835, Ziba S. Beardsley came to the shores of the lake and commented that the "waters were as clear as crystal", thereby giving the lake its name. Ziba Beardsley continued south to Naperville. In February 1836, the first white settlers, Beman and Polly Crandall, and six of their ten children arrived from New York State, traveling to Crystal Lake in a covered wagon. Their original cabin was built near today's intersection of Virginia Street and Van Buren Street. Four of the Crandall children were born there. Najah Beardsley's family was the second to settle in the area; his grandson, William Beardsley, was the first white child born on the Crystal Lake prairie, on May 7, 1837.

The town was first known as Crystal Ville. It was changed to Crystal Lake sometime before 1840. The area known today as downtown Crystal Lake was first called Dearborn and later, Nunda, from a location in New York where many settlers originated. The village of Dearborn was founded in the 1850s after railroads were extended through the area. The first train station was built in 1856, although it was pre-fabricated and shipped from Chicago on a flatcar. At that time, the central business district for the village of Crystal Lake was located on Virginia Street, about one mile (1.6 km) southwest of the railroad station. The railroad connected the people and industries of Crystal Lake and Dearborn to Chicago and the rest of the country.

On October 7, 1868, Dearborn's name was changed to Nunda. The village was platted in 1868 by local surveyor John Brink, after whom a downtown street is now named. The village included the area now generally bounded by Illinois Route 176 on the north, Crystal Lake Avenue on the south, Main Street on the east, and Walkup Avenue on the west. Much of the land was originally owned by two early settlers, Daniel Ellsworth and Simon S. Gates. The villages of Crystal Lake and Nunda were both incorporated in 1874. In 1908, the village of Nunda changed its name to North Crystal Lake. Several attempts were made to consolidate the two villages, and, after much disagreement, the Village of North Crystal Lake was annexed to the Village of Crystal Lake in 1914, and a consolidated city government was established.

=== Dole family ===
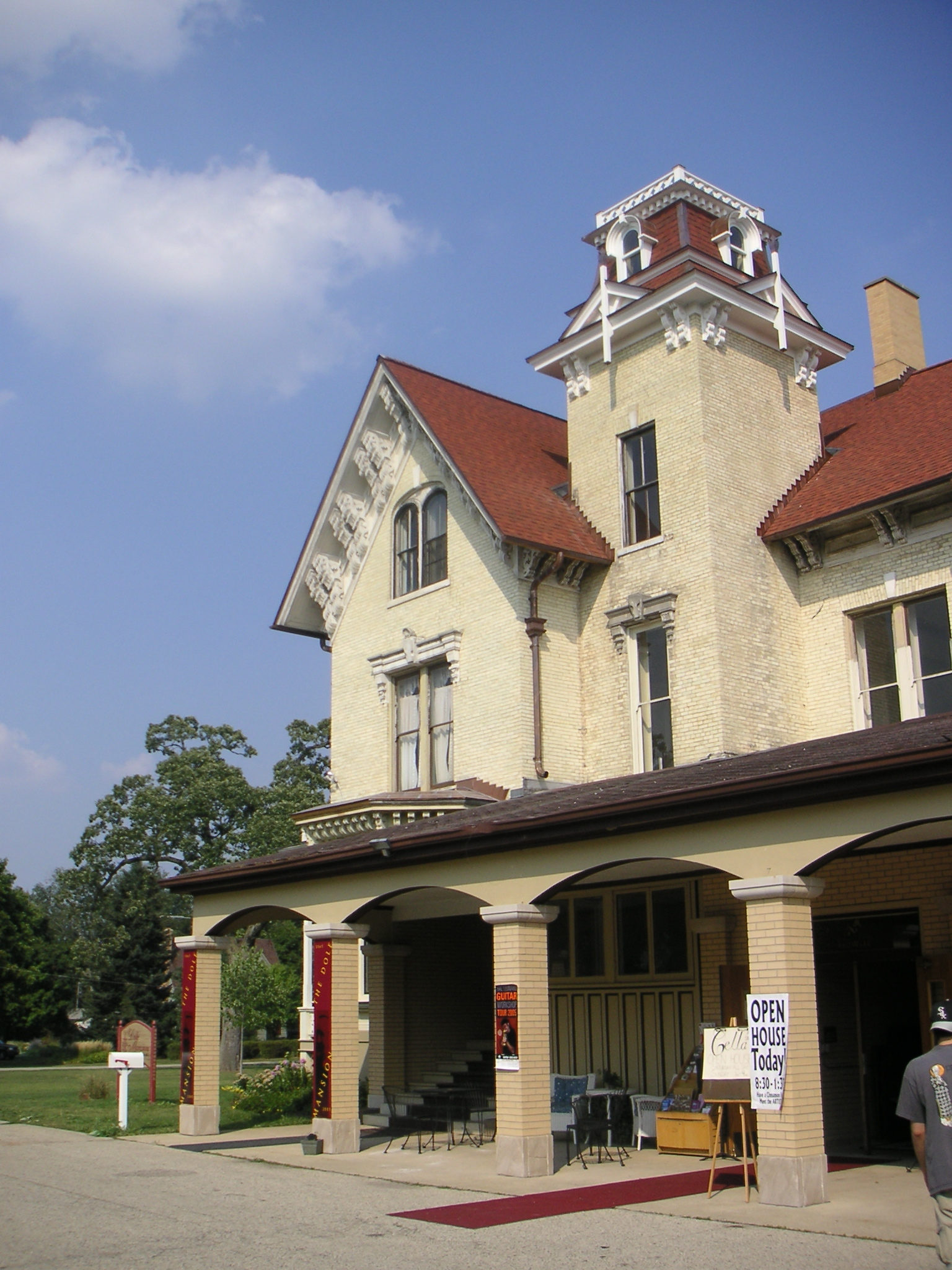
Dole Mansion

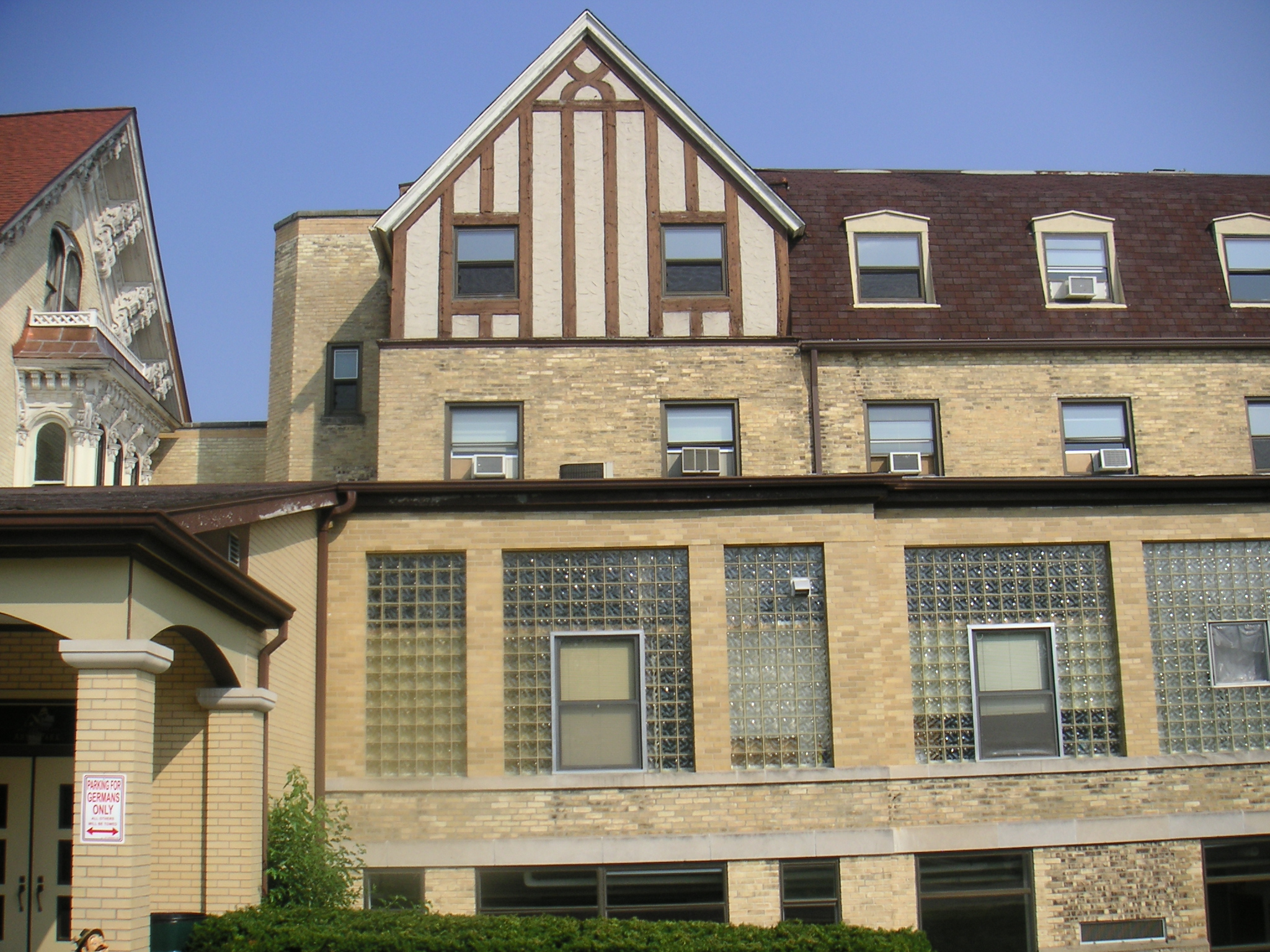
Lakeside Center

Back in the 1860s, when the town of Crystal Lake was about 25 years old, Charles S. Dole purchased over 1,000 acres (4.0 km^{2}) of land overlooking the lake. It was his dream to construct an elaborate estate that would reflect his position as a successful businessman. He was an early member of the Chicago Board of Trade, being associated with Armour, Dole & Co. in Chicago. To carry out his plan, he built a three-story mansion with adjoining gardens and stables. European artisans were imported to lay parquet floors, fashion archways, and carve interior woodwork from black walnut trees grown on the property. As a final touch, he brought in Italian artisans to build several marble fireplaces. According to Dole's obituary, construction costs exceeded $100,000, an enormous amount of money in those days.

The estate was known as Lakeland Farm. Dole lived there with his wife, Julia, his mother-in-law, Mrs. Harriet Coffin, his two daughters, Mary Florence and Harriet (Hattie), and his son, Sydney. Dole maintained the estate for over 30 years, entertaining lavishly. For example, for his daughter's wedding in 1883, he built a spur line from the Chicago and Northwestern Railway tracks almost to his doorstep. A canopied, carpeted walkway extended 750 feet (230 m) from the front door to the train, enabling guests to walk to the mansion for the ceremony and return to the train without concern for the weather. Notable wedding guests included Julian Rumsey (mayor of Chicago and Dole's first cousin) and Levi Leiter (first partner with Marshall Field).

Dole's interests changed throughout the years. He laid out a half-mile racetrack on his property and purchased the finest horses that money could buy, soon accumulating a string of horses that was the envy of northern Illinois. It is said that Dole loved to go up to his tower (currently closed) and watch his horses run. When tired of the fad of his stable, he disposed of his horses by holding an elaborate sale. The Doles lived in the mansion until the late 1890s, when the property was sold to his son-in-law for $1.00.

During the early 1900s, the property was owned and operated by several ice companies. Ice was harvested from Crystal Lake and shipped by rail to nearby Chicago. The advent of refrigeration brought about the decline of the ice business. After lying vacant for several years, the property was sold in 1922 to the Lake Development Company. The building was purchased by the First Congregational Church of Crystal Lake in 1977. The annex portion of the structure was renovated through thousands of volunteer hours. The Church named the facility "Lakeside Center". It operated it as a community activities center, hosting Friendship House Day Care Center for children, church offices, meeting rooms, reception hall, and retreat facilities. Today, the Dole Mansion is owned by Lakeside Legacy, along with Lakeside Center, the building connected to it. Dole Mansion is located along the lake, and a festival is held on the grounds every year.

=== Eliza Ringling ===
Ringling Road is an east–west road which curves from Country Club Road back up to Lake Avenue. There are fewer than one dozen houses that claim a Ringling Road address, but those houses range from a small, stone cottage to large, imposing mansions. Ringling Road provides the northern boundary for the Dole Mansion property. The road was named after Eliza "Lou" Ringling, who, as founder of the Lake Development Company, purchased the Dole Mansion in 1922 and converted it into the Crystal Lake Country Club. The transaction involved nearly half a million dollars and was one of the largest real estate deals handled in the area. The original Crystal Lake Country Club faltered during the 1929 stock market crash. Mrs. Ringling, with her group of investors (the Lake Development Company) subdivided much of the large Dole estate into what is known as the Country Club Additions subdivision parts of which are in the neighboring village Lakewood, Illinois.

Eliza "Lou" Ringling was the widow of the oldest Ringling brother, Albert, of circus fame.

=== Teco pottery ===
The American Terra Cotta Tile and Ceramic Company was founded in 1881 just north of Crystal Lake, Illinois. Most of the workers at the tile and ceramic works factory lived in Crystal Lake, The production consisted of drain tile, brick and architectural items. In 1886, the Gates Pottery was established as a subsidiary of William D. Gates, a Crystal Lake-area native, as its president. The company fabricated architectural glazed terra cotta used on buildings designed by architects Louis Sullivan and Frank Lloyd Wright in the Prairie School style. American Terra Cotta's company records show that architectural glazed terra cotta was used on many local buildings including Oak Manufacturing Company, Teckler Building, Cohn Store, Telephone Exchange and Commercial Building, El Tovar Theatre, Crystal Lake Community High School (now Crystal Lake Central High School) and additions, Central School and additions, Pure Oil Research Lab and additions, Sinclair Refining Company Service Station, Warner Building, Citizens State Bank, Garbe Garage, Home State Bank, various Williams Street stores and bakeries, and Martinetti's Restaurant and Motel.

Gates used the facilities to experiment with clays and glazes in an effort to design a line of art pottery, which led to the introduction of Teco pottery (from Terra Cotta, but pronounced locally as "Tea-co") in 1902. Many of the pottery pieces were designed by architects such as Frank Lloyd Wright. Produced for only a few years, this pottery exemplifies the Arts and Crafts Movement and today is highly sought after by art collectors. Teco pottery is in the collection of many museums.

=== Recent history ===
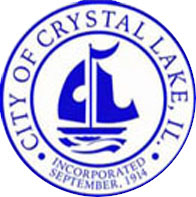
Former city logo

On April 11, 1965, during the Palm Sunday tornado outbreak, a large and devastating tornado damaged or destroyed large portions of the city. The tornado killed six people and further 75 wounded. Damage to the town totaled over $1.5 million, with 80 homes, mainly in the Coventry and Colby's Home Estates neighborhoods, damaged. A shopping center was utterly destroyed. Disaster shelters were set up to house people experiencing homelessness, and then-governor of Illinois, Otto Kerner, Jr., personally visited the city to view the damage.

Crystal Lake is the city where the tradition of giving gold coins to the Salvation Army anonymously began in 1982.

From 1972 to 1986, the Academy Awards Oscar statues were cast in Crystal Lake.

In the late 20th and early 21st centuries, Crystal Lake's history was marked by the growth of suburban subdivisions, as the population increased from 21,823 in the 1990 Census to 38,000 in the 2000 Census. To address growth, Crystal Lake South High School was opened in 1978. Previously, Crystal Lake Community High School (now Crystal Lake Central High School) had served the entire city of Crystal Lake since 1924. A third high school, Prairie Ridge High School, opened in 1997 north of the town to accommodate the spread moving into the area between Crystal Lake and the two communities directly to its north, Prairie Grove and Bull Valley.

On July 7, 2021, U.S. President Joe Biden visited McHenry County College in Crystal Lake, becoming the first sitting president to see the city. Then-Vice President George H. W. Bush had twice visited Crystal Lake in 1988 while campaigning for president.

== Geography ==
According to the 2010 census, Crystal Lake has a total area of 18.957 square miles (49.10 km^{2}), of which 18.35 square miles (47.53 km^{2}) (or 96.8%) is land and 0.607 square miles (1.57 km^{2}) (or 3.2%) is water.

In 2023, census data reported that Crystal Lake has a total area of 18.985 square miles (49.10 km^{2}), of which 18.35 square miles (47.53 km^{2}) (or 96.8%) is land and 0.613 square miles (1.59 km^{2}) (or 3.2%) is water.

=== Neighborhoods ===
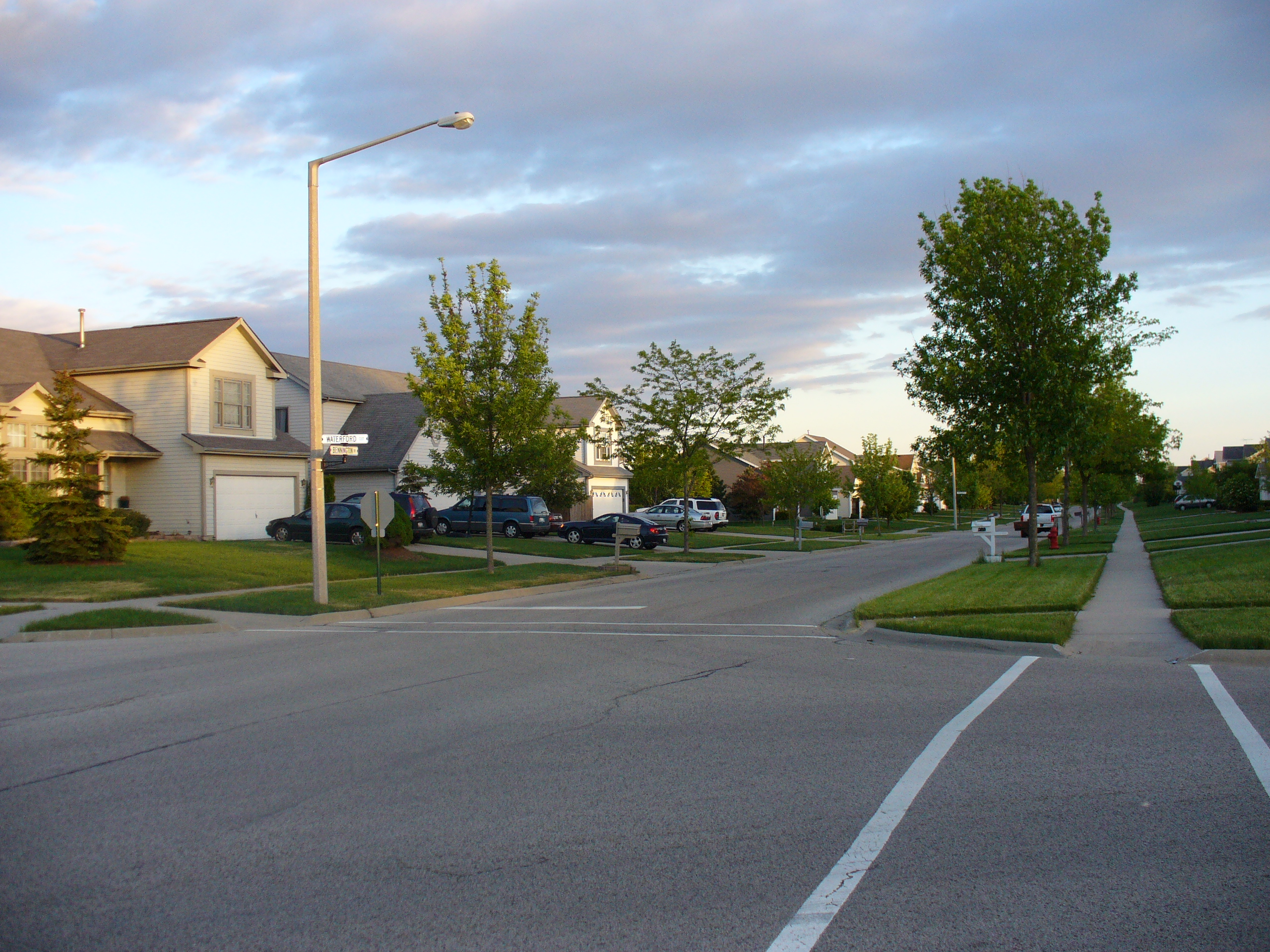
The intersection of Waterford and Bennington

As the largest city in McHenry County, Crystal Lake has three high schools and many distinct neighborhoods.

Starting from the north of the city, the ten largest neighborhoods are easy to trace out. The first has no de facto name like the others, but is referred to as "by Prairie Ridge," referring to the nearby high school of the same name. Houses in this neighborhood are large and widely spaced. The entire area lies just to the north of the city, from the downtown area to the adjacent community of Bull Valley. Some of the communities include Deer Wood, Covered Bridge Trails, and Walk-up Woods. Next is downtown Crystal Lake, which surrounds Crystal Lake Central High School. Houses here range significantly in size and age, and it is the most diverse neighborhood in the city. Directly south of downtown Crystal Lake is the Coventry neighborhood, named for the major through street, Coventry Lane. Students in the Coventry neighborhood attend either Central High School of Crystal Lake or Crystal Lake South High School. Oral tradition holds that Coventry was initially populated by pilots who flew out of O'Hare Airport. The neighborhood, Burtons Bridge, is located at the north-eastern side of Crystal Lake, adjacent to the Fox River.

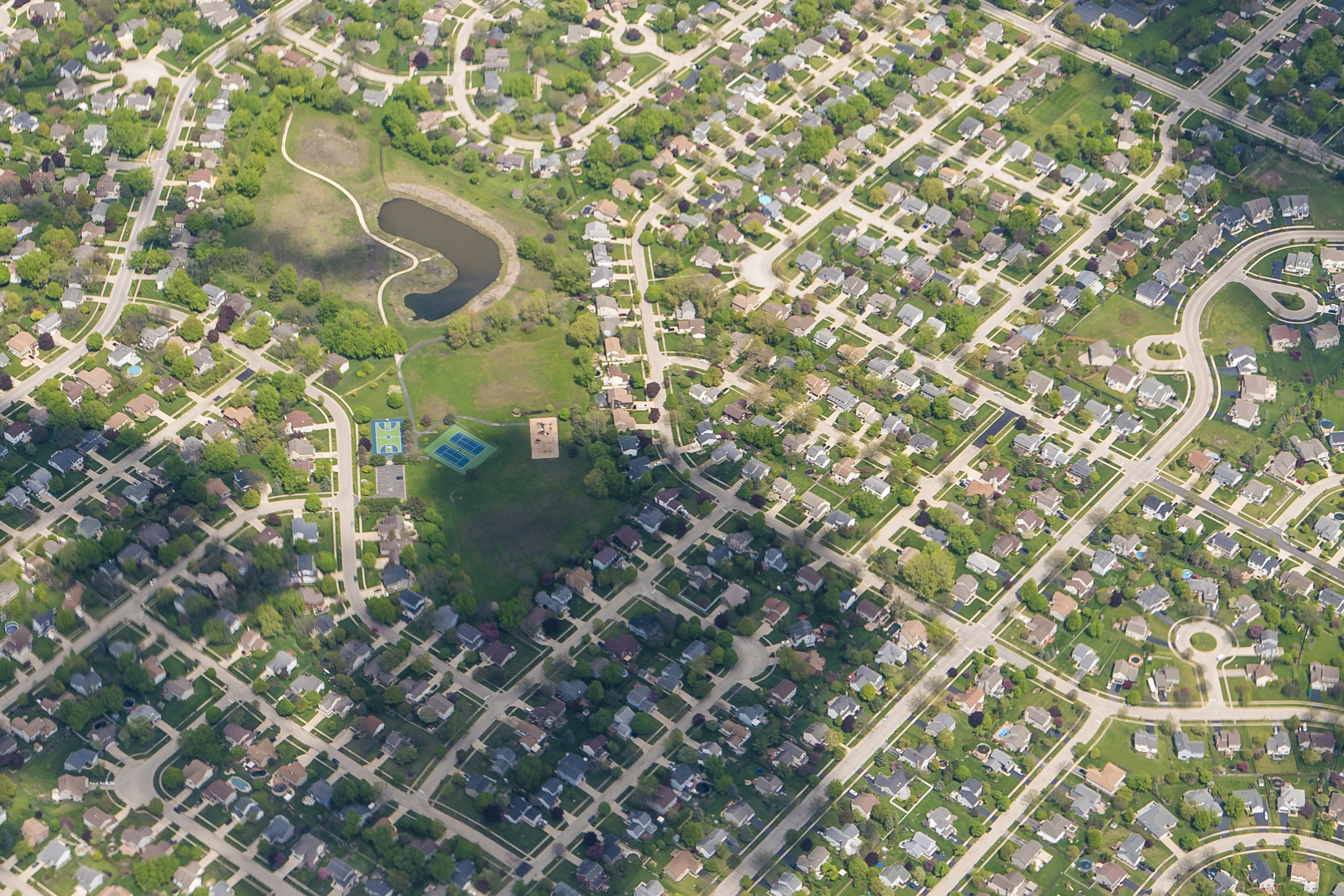
Crystal Lake subdivisions

To the southwest of downtown Crystal Lake is the sprawling Four Colonies neighborhood, which covers nearly 2.5 sq mi (6.5 km^{2}). Students from Four Colonies attend both Central and South High School. South of Four Colonies is The Villages neighborhood, which is named for its major thoroughfare, Village Road. An important feature of The Villages is Indian Prairie Elementary School, which sits on a large, steep series of hills that is a favorite sledding spot during the snowy months. The residents attend South High School. A neighborhood Northeast of Four Colonies is Wedgewood. Wedgewood includes five ponds, a forest that backs up to Huntley Road, and a paved walking path. Wedgewood has five brick entrance signs reading "Wedgewood" and 3 prominent entrances: the front entrance at the intersection of Huntley Road and Lakeview Drive, the back entrance at the intersection of Huntley Road and Boneset Drive, and the side entrance on Country Club Road. Wedgewood consists of single-family homes and multi-family dwellings such as townhouses. Wedgewood Drive circles the entire neighborhood and is a 1 1/2-mile loop.

Other neighborhoods in Crystal Lake ring the town's namesake lake, and are called West End, North Shore, and the Vista. These neighborhoods consist of many older homes built on the lake shore, and vary significantly in size and style. Effectively, a neighborhood occupying the entire south coast of the lake is the independent Village of Lakewood, historically a restricted community closely connected to the Crystal Lake Country Club on its shores.

=== Climate ===
The city's climate is much like that of its large neighboring city, Chicago. The city experiences hot summers and cold winters, with temperatures slightly more extreme than those in nearby suburbs, because the town is still surrounded by rural land. Due to the lack of the urban heat island effect, Crystal Lake experiences colder nights and lower precipitation than recorded at Chicago. High temperatures are usually comparable to those in Chicago, with only a few degrees difference on most days.

The hottest month of the year is July, when the average high temperature is approximately 86 °F (30 °C). Temperatures in July and in summer in general can frequently exceed 95 °F (35 °C) and occasionally exceed 100 °F (38 °C), although this does not happen every year. The coldest month of the year is January, with an average high temperature of 23 °F (−5 °C). Overnight low temperatures are usually around 8 °F (−13 °C). In winter, the low temperatures fall below 0 °F (−18 °C) on many occasions (often 15, 20, or more) per year. Freezing nights may record temperatures as low as −20 °F (−29 °C), but this is rare and does not occur every year.

The wettest month of the year is August, when thunderstorms bring brief, heavy downpours. July is the second-wettest month of the year, also mainly due to thunderstorms. However, long dry spells can also occur at this time of year, sometimes lasting weeks. The two driest months of the year are January and February, when almost all of the precipitation falls as snow. In a typical year, total precipitation is 37 inches (940 mm) with a winter snowfall total of 40 inches (1,000 mm). Although rare, significant snowstorms do occur and can accumulate large amounts of snow. In many years, at least one storm will deliver 12 inches (300 mm) of snow in one day. Most snow-bearing systems are Alberta clippers, while the more infrequent heavy snows are caused by Panhandle hooks.

Climate data for Crystal Lake, Illinois, 1981–2010 normals, extremes 1849–present
Month	Jan	Feb	Mar	Apr	May	Jun	Jul	Aug	Sep	Oct	Nov	Dec	Year
Record high °F (°C)	62 (17)	70 (21)	82 (28)	91 (33)	92 (33)	101 (38)	101 (38)	98 (37)	95 (35)	89 (32)	75 (24)	67 (19)	101 (38)
Mean daily maximum °F (°C)	28 (−2)	33 (1)	44 (7)	58 (14)	69 (21)	79 (26)	83 (28)	81 (27)	74 (23)	62 (17)	46 (8)	33 (1)	58 (14)
Daily mean °F (°C)	20 (−7)	25 (−4)	35 (2)	47 (8)	58 (14)	68 (20)	73 (23)	71 (22)	63 (17)	51 (11)	38 (3)	25 (−4)	48 (9)
Mean daily minimum °F (°C)	11 (−12)	16 (−9)	26 (−3)	36 (2)	47 (8)	57 (14)	62 (17)	60 (16)	51 (11)	40 (4)	29 (−2)	17 (−8)	38 (3)
Record low °F (°C)	−27 (−33)	−22 (−30)	−8 (−22)	11 (−12)	28 (−2)	36 (2)	45 (7)	40 (4)	29 (−2)	18 (−8)	−7 (−22)	−24 (−31)	−27 (−33)
Average rainfall inches (mm)	1.68 (43)	1.38 (35)	2.23 (57)	3.91 (99)	3.84 (98)	4.31 (109)	3.93 (100)	4.43 (113)	3.63 (92)	2.66 (68)	3.12 (79)	2.1 (53)	37.22 (945)
Average snowfall inches (cm)	10.2 (26)	7.3 (19)	4.5 (11)	1.1 (2.8)	—	0.0 (0.0)	0.0 (0.0)	0.0 (0.0)	0.0 (0.0)	0.1 (0.25)	1.5 (3.8)	9.8 (25)	34.5 (88)
Source 1: http://www.intellicast.com/Local/History.aspx?location=USIL0280
Source 2: https://w2.weather.gov/climate/xmacis.php?wfo=lot

=== Surrounding areas ===
Ridgefield / Bull Valley
Woodstock Prairie Grove
Lakewood Oakwood Hills / Cary
Lakewood Lake in the Hills
Lake in the Hills

== Demographics ==
Historical population
Census	Pop.	Note	%±
1880	546		—
1890	781		43.0%
1900	950		21.6%
1910	1,242		30.7%
1920	2,249		81.1%
1930	3,732		65.9%
1940	3,917		5.0%
1950	4,832		23.4%
1960	8,314		72.1%
1970	14,541		74.9%
1980	18,590		27.8%
1990	24,512		31.9%
2000	38,000		55.0%
2010	40,743		7.2%
2020	40,269		−1.2%
U.S. Decennial Census; 2010 2020

=== Racial and ethnic composition ===
Crystal Lake, Illinois – Racial and ethnic composition Note: the US Census treats Hispanic/Latino as an ethnic category. This table excludes Latinos from the racial categories and assigns them to a separate category. Hispanics/Latinos may be of any race.
Race / Ethnicity (NH = Non-Hispanic)	Pop 2000	Pop 2010	Pop 2020	% 2000	% 2010	% 2020
White alone (NH)	34,067	33,951	30,976	89.65%	83.33%	76.92%
Black or African American alone (NH)	193	377	586	0.51%	0.93%	1.46%
Native American or Alaska Native alone (NH)	53	54	37	0.14%	0.13%	0.09%
Asian alone (NH)	735	1,012	1,091	1.93%	2.48%	2.71%
Native Hawaiian or Pacific Islander alone (NH)	4	7	3	0.01%	0.02%	0.01%
Other race alone (NH)	19	27	147	0.05%	0.07%	0.37%
Mixed race or Multiracial (NH)	267	545	1,474	0.70%	1.34%	3.66%
Hispanic or Latino (any race)	2,662	4,770	5,955	7.01%	11.71%	14.79%
Total	38,000	40,743	40,269	100.00%	100.00%	100.00%

=== 2020 census ===
As of the 2020 census, Crystal Lake had a population of 40,269, 14,780 households, and 10,551 families.

The median age was 39.4 years; 6.1% of residents were under the age of 5, 23.5% were under 18, and 14.7% were 65 or older. For every 100 females there were 95.2 males, and for every 100 females age 18 and over there were 92.7 males age 18 and over.

About 99.6% of residents lived in urban areas and 0.4% lived in rural areas.

Of the 14,780 households, 34.3% had children under the age of 18 living in them. Married-couple households made up 56.3% of all households, 13.9% had a male householder with no spouse or partner present, and 23.6% had a female householder with no spouse or partner present. About 22.5% of all households were made up of individuals, and 10.2% had someone living alone who was 65 years of age or older.

There were 15,371 housing units, of which 3.8% were vacant; the homeowner vacancy rate was 1.3% and the rental vacancy rate was 6.0%. In total, 31.9% of housing units were in multi-unit structures.

Racial composition as of the 2020 census
Race	Number	Percent
White	32,124	79.8%
Black or African American	619	1.5%
American Indian and Alaska Native	165	0.4%
Asian	1,122	2.8%
Native Hawaiian and Other Pacific Islander	4	0.0%
Some other race	2,476	6.1%
Two or more races	3,759	9.3%
Hispanic or Latino (of any race)	5,955	14.8%

In 1990, the Latino (Hispanic) population was 0.1%. Per the 2000 US Census, the Latino population increased to 7%, and per the 2010 US Census, the Latino population increased to 11.7%. As of 2020, the population of Latinos is 14.8%.

=== Income and poverty ===
The median household income in the city was $87,578, and the median family income was $105,324. Males had a median income of $58,611 versus $41,026 for females. The median income for the city was $36,405. About 4.9% of families and 6.9% of the population were below the poverty line, including 9.9% of those under age 18 and 6.2% of those age 65 or over.

=== 2010 census ===
As of the 2010 Census, there were 40,743 people, 14,421 households, and 10,551 families living in the city. The population density was 2,220/sq mi (857/km^{2}). There were 15,176 total housing units, and 22% of all housing units were in multi-unit structures. The racial makeup of the city was 90.2% White, 1.0% Black or African American, 0.4% Native American, 2.5% Asian, <0.01% Pacific Islander, 4.1% from other races, and 1.8% from two or more races. Hispanic or Latino of any race were 11.7% of the population.

39.2% of the households included children under 18, 58.9% were married couples living together, 10.1% had a female householder with no husband present, and 26.8% were non-families. 22.1% of all households were made up of individuals living alone, and 20.3% had someone at least 65 years old living alone. The average household size was 2.81, and the average family size was 3.31.

In the city, the population was spread out, with 28.1% under the age of 18, 8.% from 18 to 24, 26.2% from 25 to 44, 27.7% from 45 to 64, and 10.0% who were 65 years of age or older. The median age was 37 years. For every 100 females, there were 97.6 males.

The median income for a household in the city was $78,311, and the median income for a family was $91,870. Males had a median income of $61,982 versus $44,288 for females. The median income for the city was $36,405. About 5.2% of families and 6.2% of the population were below the poverty line, including 9.1% of those under age 18 and 5.3% of those age 65 or over.

== Arts and culture ==
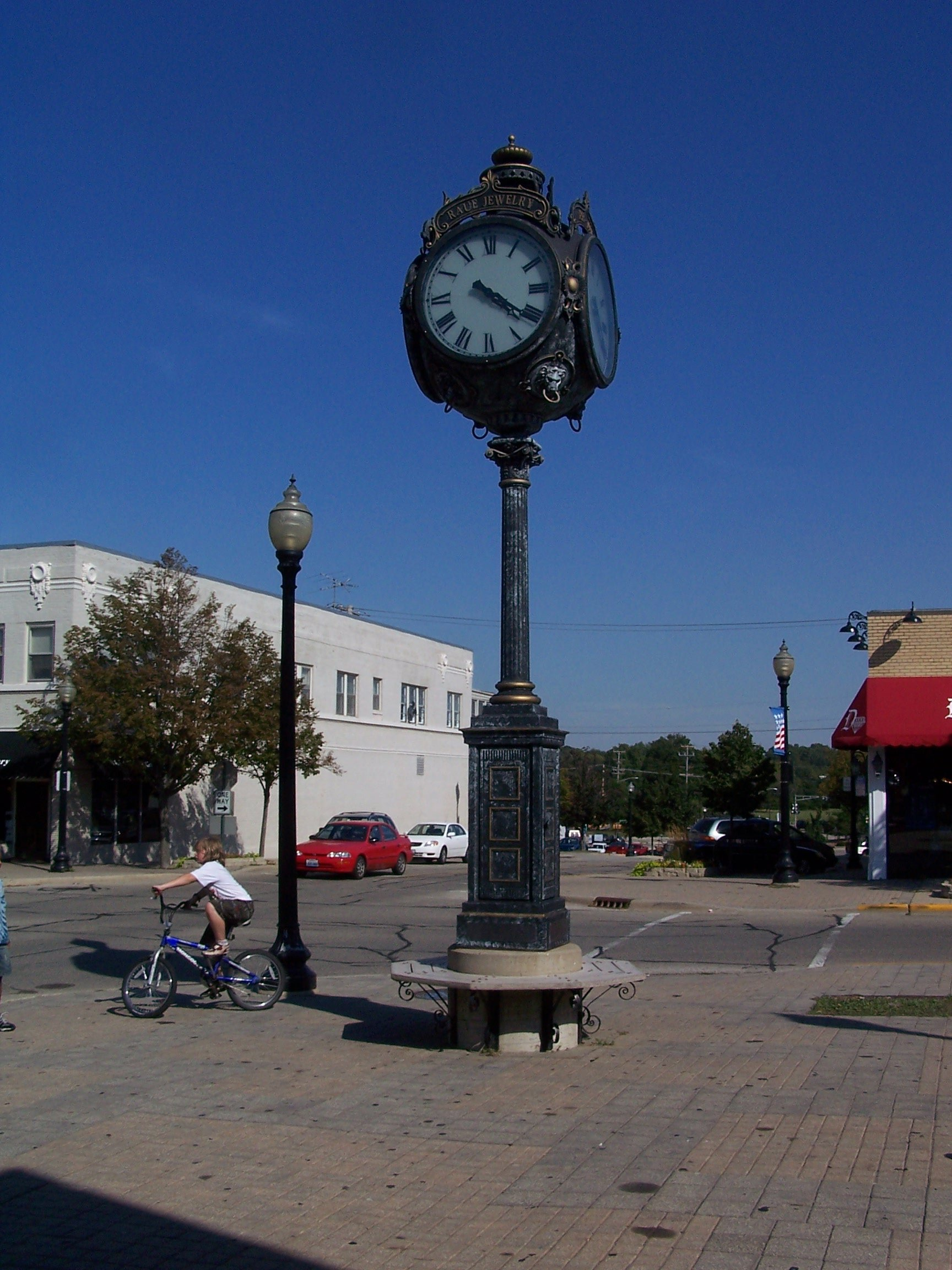
Clock located at the intersection of Brink and William Streets

Crystal Lake, as a city, is large enough to support its cultural institutions. However, it also offers many cultural opportunities in the city of Chicago and the other large communities that surround it, which are easily accessible from Crystal Lake and vice versa. The city is home to the Northwest Herald, the only daily newspaper published in McHenry County. The newspaper primarily covers local issues, but also carries national and international news. Churches also have a significant influence on the city, hosting many annual events. Crystal Lake is also home to WZSR Star 105.5, owned by Alpha Media, which broadcasts throughout the northwest suburbs and Fox Valley.

Another significant presence in the city is the Crystal Lake Park District, which manages all the city's numerous parks and the annual events held within them. Two major parks run by the park district are Veterans Acres, along Walkup Road, and Main Beach, along with the namesake Crystal Lake. Crystal Lake is open whenever the weather is accommodating. However, boating is often restricted due to disputes with both the homeowners on the lake and the village of Lakewood, which lies on approximately 30% of the lake. The Crystal Lake Rowing Club has a boathouse in Kamijima Park, on the west end of Crystal Lake, and rows on the lake during the no-wake hours (usually early mornings and early evenings). In Crystal Lake, the famed Dole mansion stands, where visitors can take tours for a small donation.

Among the city's attractions is the historic downtown district. The downtown district, which has recently undergone revitalization, is home to many small specialty shops and businesses and is a local shopping hub. Also located in the downtown district is the Raue Center for the Arts, which seats 750 and performs plays and hosts concerts throughout the year. Raue Center has recently transformed itself into a regional destination by providing an in-house professional theater company, Williams Street Repertory, a Jazz Festival launched by Ramsey Lewis, and hosting several recent Tony, Grammy, and Academy Award winners. The Raue Center has received four MacArthur Grants and regularly receives support from the National Endowment for the Arts. The city is also home to the Crystal Lake Strikers Drumline, Crystal Lake Community Band, and Encore Music Academy, home of Encore Youth Choir, McHenry County Youth Orchestra, and Voices in Harmony (formerly known as the Crystal Lake Community Choir).

The Col. Gustavus A. Palmer House is a historic residence in Crystal Lake, constructed in 1858.

== Economy ==
The economy of Crystal Lake is relatively decentralized, with no central industry within the city. There are several large companies, but none of them is a majority employer. The city's main economic activities are retail, dining, and light industry. This includes small, specialized, locally owned shops and restaurants as well as broader-ranged national chains. There are several industrial parks in Crystal Lake, home to small, independently owned businesses operating in various industries, such as landscaping and automotive repair.

The shopping center for most of Crystal Lake centers on "the strip", a long stretch of road that runs along what used to be Crystal Pointe Mall but is now a series of strip malls. The strip is located on Route 14 between Route 31 and Dole Avenue. As the name suggests, this area is mainly made up of national chains. Another shopping area is the downtown district, which features some small independent stores. Because of parking challenges in the downtown area, many thriving independent businesses are located in convenient areas throughout the city, where customer access is more centralized, and parking is more abundant.

The south side of the city features several gravel quarries. A majority of these quarries are already exhausted and have been allowed to fill with water, forming an area known as the Vulcan Lakes, which also stretches into Lake in the Hills and Algonquin. The two northernmost lakes are now known as the Three Oaks Recreation Area. Recreational operations at this site started in Autumn, 2010, and it has since become one of the most popular destinations in Crystal Lake.

In 2016, it was reported that there were zero retail vacancies in the downtown district of Crystal Lake. This was the case until 2017.

== Parks and recreation ==
The Crystal Lake Park District, a separate elected governing body not associated with the city, offers more than 40 parks and recreation areas. Notable parks maintained by the Park District include the 140-acre Veteran Acres Park and Lippold Park, the district's largest single park at 305 acres.

== Government ==
=== Mayor ===
The Mayor presides at all meetings of the city council. He is otherwise the head of the city government for all ceremonial purposes, and any other purposes determined by the city council, or in emergencies, by the governor. The mayor has no regular administrative duties, as the city operates under a council–manager form of government.

Mayors of Crystal Lake, Illinois

Image	Mayor	Years	Notes
	William Pinnow	1914–1917	
	W.A. Goodman	1917–1923	
	Benno Raue, Sr.	1923–1927	
	Fred Mathis	1927–1931	
	John A. Peterson	1931–1940	
	Joseph J. Jaster	1940–1941	
	George Krause	1941–1953	
	Hal Tripp	1953–1957	
	Leo Krumme	1957–1959	
	Louis J. Goosens	1959–1971	
	Anthony Wujcik	1971–1974	
	Arlene B. Fetzner	1974–1979	
	Carl Wehde	1979–1991	
	George Wells	1991–1995	
	Robert J. Wagner	1995–1999	
	Aaron T. Shepley	1999–2020	Longest-serving mayor of Crystal Lake, died in office
	Haig Haleblian	2020–Present	Served in an acting capacity from 2020 to 2021

Aaron T. Shepley was the mayor of Crystal Lake from 1999 to his death in 2020, making him the longest-serving mayor in the city's history.

The current mayor is Haig Haleblian. The city council consists of Ellen Brady, Brett Hopkins, Cameron Hubbard, Mandy Montford, Ian Philpot, and Denise Smith. Nick Kachiroubas is the City Clerk in Crystal Lake.

== Education ==
Crystal Lake's high schools are part of Community High School District 155. Crystal Lake Community Consolidated School District 47 operates all the city's elementary and middle schools. Prairie Grove Consolidated School District #46 also serves a portion of northeast Crystal Lake.

Five high schools serve the city of Crystal Lake. The oldest, Crystal Lake Central High School, graduated its first class in 1924. In response to population growth, Crystal Lake South High School was opened in 1978. Prairie Ridge High School opened in the fall of 1997. Small portions of Crystal Lake are served by Cary-Grove High School and Woodstock High School. Also located in Crystal Lake is Faith Lutheran High School, which serves the larger McHenry County area.

Additional schools serving Crystal Lake include Lord and Savior Lutheran School, a Pre-K-8 grade school of the Wisconsin Evangelical Lutheran Synod in Crystal Lake, St. Thomas the Apostle, a private Roman Catholic school that serves Pre-K through eighth grade, also in Crystal Lake, Immanuel Lutheran School, a private Lutheran school that serves Pre-K through eighth grade, also in Crystal Lake, Alexander Leigh Center for Autism in McHenry, a full day, year-round therapeutic day school for children 3–21 years old with autism spectrum disorder, OHI, multiple disabilities, developmental delay and/or intellectual disabilities, and the School of Expressive Arts & Learning campus in Woodstock for those with learning disorders and autism spectrum disorder.

Additionally, there are two colleges in Crystal Lake: McHenry County College, a community college, which offers associates degrees. Columbia College also has an extension campus based in Crystal Lake.

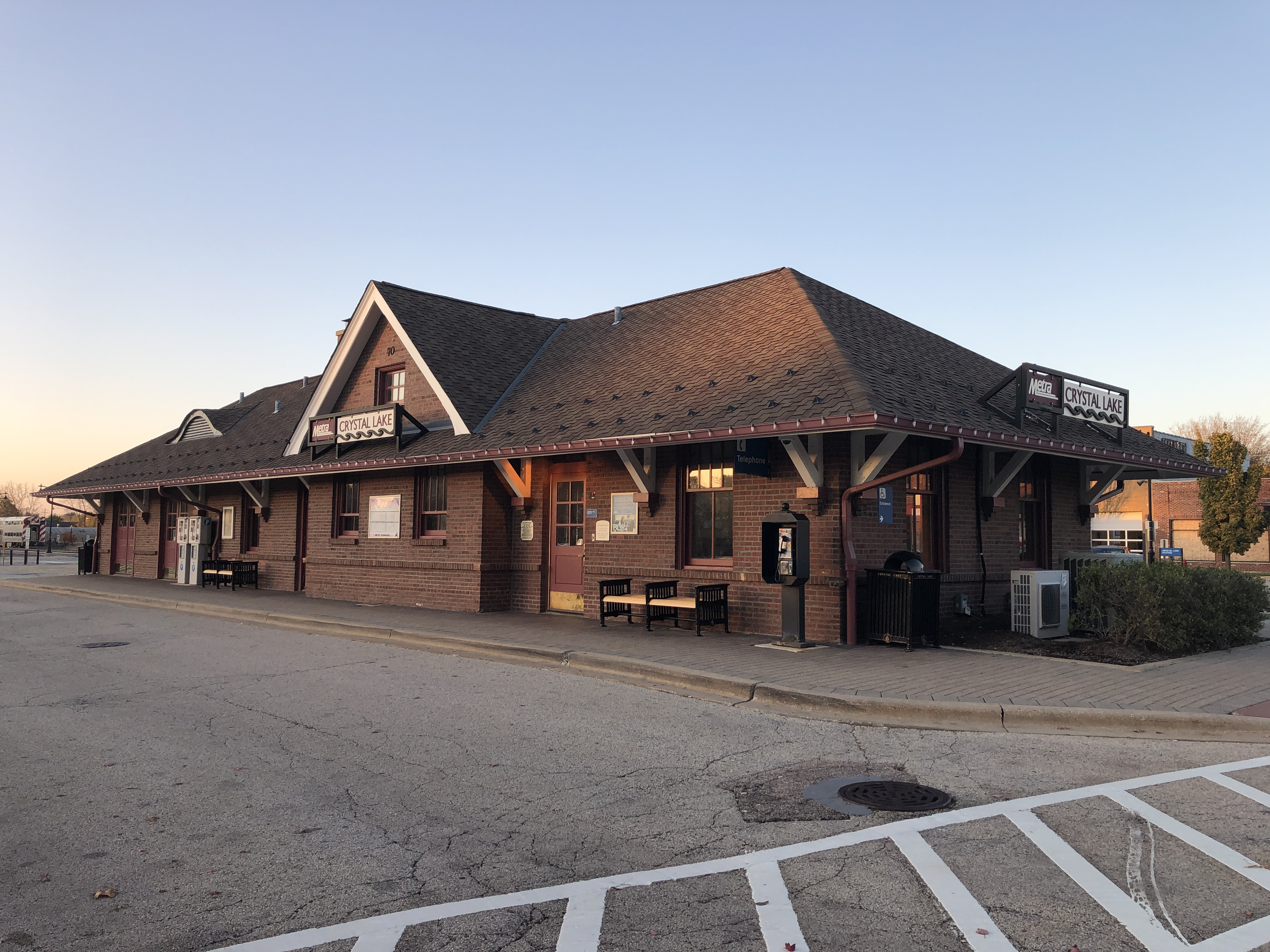
Crystal Lake Train Station

== Transportation ==
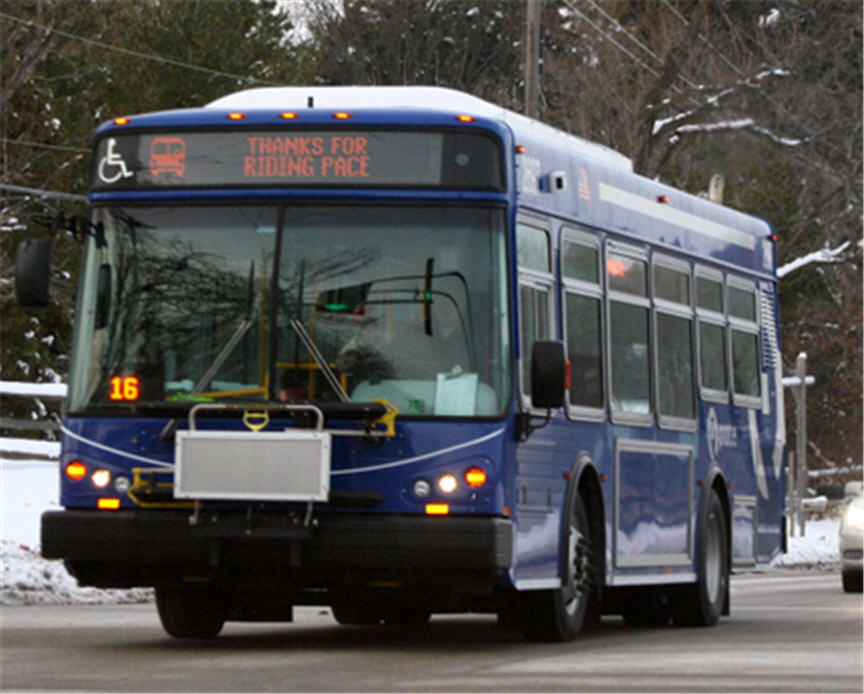
A Pace bus in Crystal Lake

Crystal Lake is located 45 miles (72 km) northwest of Chicago, is about a 45-minute drive from O'Hare International Airport, and is near several major highways: U.S. Route 14, Illinois Route 176, and Illinois Route 31.

The Metra Union Pacific Northwest Line provides transportation to and from Chicago Ogilvie Transportation Center, and all other UP-NW stations. In Crystal Lake, UP-NW trains stop at Crystal Lake and Pingree Road stations. Also serving Crystal Lake is the Pace Bus system, which is owned by the Regional Transportation Authority.

== Sister cities ==
- Holzgerlingen, Germany (since 1996)

== See also ==
- Cary, Illinois
- Lakewood, Illinois
- Bull Valley, Illinois
- Prairie Grove, Illinois
- McHenry, Illinois
- Huntley, Illinois
- Ridgefield, Illinois
- Woodstock, Illinois
