= Grafton Township, Illinois =

Coordinates: 42°11′31″N 88°24′46″W

Grafton Township
- Township
- Location in McHenry County
- Country: United States
- State: Illinois
- County: McHenry
- Established: November 6, 1849

Area
  - Total: 36.13 sq mi (93.6 km^{2})
  - Land: 35.79 sq mi (92.7 km^{2})
  - Water: 0.34 sq mi (0.88 km^{2}) 0.94%

Population (2010)
  - Estimate (2016): 55,053
  - Density: 1,484.8/sq mi (573.3/km^{2})
- Time zone: UTC-6 (CST)
  - Summer (DST): UTC-5 (CDT)
- FIPS code: 17-111-30666
- Website: http://www.graftontownship.us

Grafton Township is located in McHenry County, Illinois. As of the 2010 census, its population was 53,137 and it contained 17,922 housing units. Grafton Township includes portions of Huntley, Lake in the Hills, Algonquin, Crystal Lake, and Lakewood.

== Geography ==
According to the 2010 census, the township has a total area of 36.13 square miles (93.6 km^{2}), of which 35.79 square miles (92.7 km^{2}) (or 99.06%) is land and 0.34 square miles (0.88 km^{2}) (or 0.94%) is water.

== Demographics ==
Historical population
Census	Pop.	Note	%±
2016 (est.)	55,053
U.S. Decennial Census
