= Esplanade (Algonquin) =

Development in Illinois, United States

Coordinates: 42°8′42.3″N 88°20′17.4″W

The Esplanade is a mixed-use development under construction on Randall Road next to the lifestyle center Algonquin Commons in Algonquin, Illinois. It is part of the Algonquin Corporate Campus. It is being built by commercial developers Centerville Properties. Currently, plans are for several restaurants located in the center and peripheral edges of the property, primarily along Randall Road and Corporate Parkway. Currently, 220 apartment units and 40,000 square feet of commercial space is being constructed. Focal features include an arch over the main entrance, a namesake Esplanade was to connect the apartments and offices to the shops and restaurants in the front of the property, outdoor terraces in the office buildings, a community center near the apartments, and outdoor patio seating at the anchor restaurants, flanked by graceful ponds, fountains, and landscaping.

== Stores ==
- Sylvan Learning Center
- Fit RX
- Inner Peace Pilates
- Advanced Skin Concepts
- Hobby Lobby

== Offices ==
- Centerville Properties
- Realty Executives Cornerstone
- TechnicalPeople.com
- Windy City Strategy
