= Huntley, Illinois =

- Village
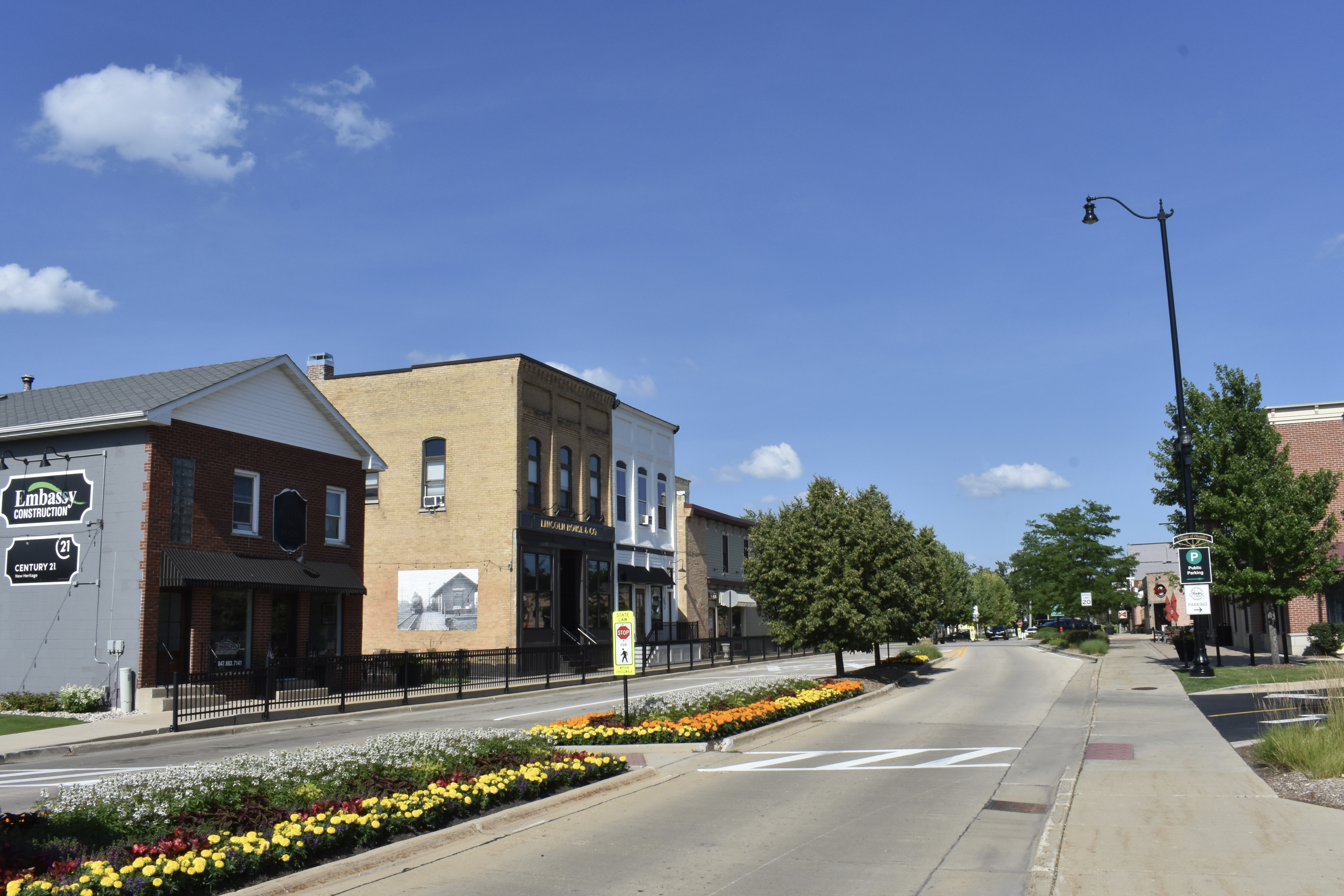
- Downtown Huntley

- Flag Logo
- Etymology: Thomas Stillwell Huntley
- Motto: The Friendly Village with Country Charm
- Location of Huntley in Kane and McHenry Counties, Illinois
- Coordinates: 42°08′20″N 88°25′58″W
- Country: United States
- State: Illinois
- Counties: Kane, McHenry
- Townships: Grafton, Hampshire, Rutland
- Founded: 1851
- Incorporated: 1872

Government
  - Type: Council–manager
  - Village President: Timothy Hoeft

Area
  - Total: 14.35 sq mi (37.17 km^{2})
  - Land: 14.29 sq mi (37.01 km^{2})
  - Water: 0.062 sq mi (0.16 km^{2})
- Elevation: 873 ft (266 m)

Population (2021)
  - Total: 28,008
  - Density: 1,941.3/sq mi (749.55/km^{2})
- Time zone: UTC-6 (CST)
  - Summer (DST): UTC-5 (CDT)
- ZIP code: 60142
- Area codes: 847, 224
- FIPS code: 17-36750
- GNIS feature ID: 2398562
- Website: www.huntley.il.us

Huntley is a village in McHenry and Kane counties, Illinois, United States. As of the 2021 census it had a population of 28,008. It is a part of the Chicago metropolitan area.

== Geography ==
According to the 2021 census gazetteer files, Huntley has a total area of 14.35 square miles (37.17 km^{2}), of which 14.29 square miles (37.01 km^{2}) (or 99.56%) is land and 0.06 square miles (0.16 km^{2}) (or 0.44%) is water.

== Demographics ==
Historical population
Census	Pop.	Note	%±
1880	505		—
1890	550		8.9%
1910	773		—
1920	720		−6.9%
1930	670		−6.9%
1940	674		0.6%
1950	830		23.1%
1960	1,143		37.7%
1970	1,432		25.3%
1980	1,646		14.9%
1990	2,453		49.0%
2000	5,730		133.6%
2010	24,291		323.9%
2020	27,740		14.2%
U.S. Decennial Census; 2010 2020

=== Racial and ethnic composition ===
Huntley village, Illinois – Racial and ethnic composition Note: the US Census treats Hispanic/Latino as an ethnic category. This table excludes Latinos from the racial categories and assigns them to a separate category. Hispanics/Latinos may be of any race.
Race / Ethnicity (NH = Non-Hispanic)	Pop 2000	Pop 2010	Pop 2020	% 2000	% 2010	% 2020
White alone (NH)	5,293	20,524	22,223	92.37%	84.49%	80.11%
Black or African American alone (NH)	22	293	450	0.38%	1.21%	1.62%
Native American or Alaska Native alone (NH)	3	40	24	0.05%	0.16%	0.09%
Asian alone (NH)	120	1,254	1,516	2.09%	5.16%	5.47%
Pacific Islander alone (NH)	0	1	1	0.00%	0.00%	0.00%
Other race alone (NH)	1	25	60	0.02%	0.10%	0.22%
Mixed race or Multiracial (NH)	46	292	883	0.80%	1.20%	3.18%
Hispanic or Latino (any race)	245	1,862	2,583	4.28%	7.67%	9.31%
Total	5,730	24,291	27,740	100.00%	100.00%	100.00%

=== 2020 census ===
As of the 2020 census, Huntley had a population of 27,740 and 7,823 families residing in the village. The population density was 1,932.83 inhabitants per square mile (746.27/km^{2}) and the housing unit density was 815.36 per square mile (314.81/km^{2}).

The median age was 48.2 years. 21.8% of residents were under the age of 18 and 32.4% of residents were 65 years of age or older. For every 100 females there were 88.9 males, and for every 100 females age 18 and over there were 84.6 males age 18 and over.

98.9% of residents lived in urban areas, while 1.1% lived in rural areas.

There were 11,190 households in Huntley, of which 28.5% had children under the age of 18 living in them. Of all households, 59.9% were married-couple households, 10.0% were households with a male householder and no spouse or partner present, and 26.8% were households with a female householder and no spouse or partner present. About 27.8% of all households were made up of individuals and 21.7% had someone living alone who was 65 years of age or older.

Of the 11,702 housing units, 4.4% were vacant. The homeowner vacancy rate was 1.1% and the rental vacancy rate was 11.0%.

=== Income and poverty ===
The median income for a household in the village was $77,420, and the median income for a family was $94,495. Males had a median income of $67,701 versus $38,946 for females. The per capita income for the village was $39,735. About 2.9% of families and 6.0% of the population were below the poverty line, including 4.0% of those under age 18 and 10.3% of those age 65 or over.

== Economy ==
Huntley's economy has experienced major recent growth, through the construction of both businesses and distribution warehouses, particularly along IL-47. The town still has a small downtown area, with various restaurants and small shops.

== Government ==
Huntley is governed as a village with an elected village president and a six-member board of trustees. Trustees are elected at-large to four-year staggered terms.

== Transportation ==
Illinois Route 47 runs north–south through the village for nearly seven miles

- The village is located along the "Golden Corridor" of Interstate 90/Northwest Tollway. It has direct access to I-90 via a full interchange at Illinois Route 47. Conversion of the interchange from an eastbound interchange to a full interchange was completed in November 2013.
- Illinois Route 47 serves as the chief north–south artery in Huntley. Handling over 20,000 vehicles a day, Route 47 was expanded from two to five lanes in 2011. Portions of Route 47 between Kreutzer Road and I-90 are six lanes. Route 47 connects to Woodstock and Hebron to the north and Pingree Grove and Elburn to the south.
- Algonquin Road and Main Street/Huntley-Dundee Road act as the village's primary east–west routes. Algonquin Road is a four-lane divided highway that connects Route 47 to other suburbs to the east like Algonquin and Lake in the Hills. Main Street connects to Marengo and Harmony roads on the west (leading to U.S. Route 20 and towns such as Marengo, Hampshire, and Union), while Huntley-Dundee Road connects to the Carpentersville-Dundee area to the east.
- Other important streets in the village include Ruth Road, Reed Road, Kreutzer Road, Haligus Road, Del Webb Boulevard, and Church Street. Reed and Kreutzer are local east–west roads, while Haligus, Ruth, and Church are local north–south streets. Del Webb Boulevard is the primary collector road in the Sun City neighborhood.
- The village is located along the Belvidere Subdivision of the Union Pacific Railroad Company, a route formerly owned by the Chicago & North Western Railroad, thus many of the village's industries are near the railroad for convenient access to Elgin, Rockford, Chicago, and the rest of the continent.
- Huntley was planned to have a stop served twice-daily by Metra on the Rockford Intercity Passenger Rail project connecting Rockford to Chicago, but has since backed out, citing concerns of how its downtown area could be affected.

== Media ==
- Northwest Herald – daily newspaper based in Crystal Lake which serves the greater McHenry County area
- Northwest Herald MyHometown – Northwest Herald's Huntley MyHometown homepage
- Daily Herald – daily newspaper based in Arlington Heights; serves cities in five counties incl. McHenry & Kane
- Huntley Farmside – weekly newspaper edited in St. Charles (Kane Co.), published in Downers Grove
- Sun Day – Biweekly/Weekly newspaper published by White Silo Media, Inc.; serves the communities of Sun City and Edgewater in Elgin.
