= Vittert =

Vittert is a surname. Notable people with the surname include:

- Leland Vittert (born 1982), American journalist and news presenter
- Liberty Vittert, American statistician, political commentator, and television host

== See also ==
- Dittert
