= 1996 West Virginia Attorney General election =

- November 5, 1996
Nominee	Darrell McGraw	Charlotte Lane
Party	Democratic	Republican
Popular vote	295,288	282,838
Percentage	51.08%	48.92%
- County results McGraw: 50–60% 60–70% 70–80% Lane: 50–60% 60–70%
Attorney General before election
Darrell McGraw
Democratic
Elected Attorney General
Darrell McGraw
Democratic

The 1996 West Virginia Attorney General election took place on November 5, 1996, to elect the Attorney General of West Virginia.

Incumbent Democratic Attorney General Darrell McGraw won re-election to a second term, beating Republican nominee Charlotte Lane.

== Democratic primary ==
=== Candidates ===
==== Nominee ====
- Darrell McGraw, incumbent Attorney General.

==== Eliminated in primary ====
- Louis "Duke" Bloom, Kanawha County commissioner.

=== Results ===
May 14, Democratic primary
Party	Candidate	Votes	%
Democratic	Darrell McGraw (incumbent)	194,529	68.61%
Democratic	Louis Bloom	88,994	31.39%
Total votes		283,523	100.00%

== Republican primary ==
=== Candidates ===
==== Nominee ====
- Charlotte Lane, former member of the West Virginia House of Delegates and candidate for the Supreme Court of Appeals in 1988.

=== Results ===
May 14, Republican primary
Party	Candidate	Votes	%
Republican	Charlotte Lane	93,873	100.00%
Total votes		93,873	100.00%

== General election ==
=== Results ===
November 5, 1996 West Virginia Attorney General election
Party	Candidate	Votes	%
Democratic	Darrell McGraw (incumbent)	295,288	51.08%
Republican	Charlotte Lane	282,838	48.92%
Total votes		578,126	100.00%
Democratic hold			
