= Sean Compton =

American radio and television executive

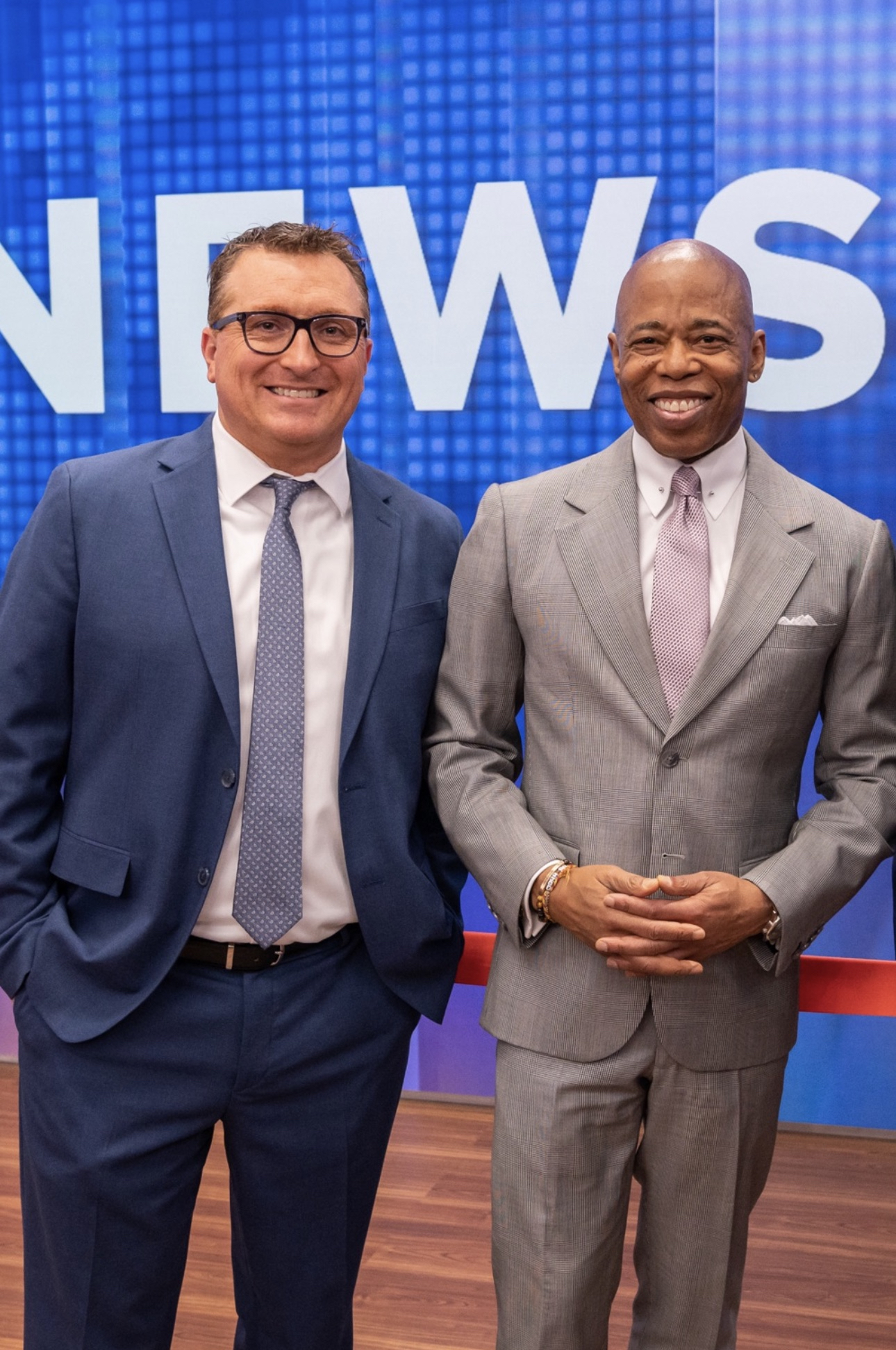
May 1st, 2023 - Sean Compton with Eric Adams, 110th New York City Mayor

Sean Compton is a Chicago-based radio and television executive.

== Biography ==
Compton began his career in radio in 1990. In 1993 he became Program Director of Cincinnati radio station WSAI eventually rising to VP of programming in 1999 for Clear Channel Radio and Premiere Radio Networks. Compton left Clear Channel radio in 2008 to join Tribune Broadcasting as President of television programming. In 2019 Nexstar acquired Tribune Broadcasting and created a networks division headed by Compton.

Compton currently serves as President of Nexstar Networks which includes the CW Network, NewsNation, Antenna TV and Rewind TV, WGN Radio, The Hill (newspaper), and programming content Acquisitions for Dallas-based Nexstar Media Group.

In January 2020, Nexstar announced it was launching "NewsNation", a Chicago-based national primetime news program on cable network WGN America with Compton at the helm. The network program, which launched September 1, 2020, is touted as news absent of bias and will compete with Fox News Channel (FNC), Cable News Network (CNN) and MSNBC. Originally launching with three hours in primetime, NewsNation expanded incrementally through April 2023, when on April 24, a "24/5" schedule began, with 24 hour programming Monday through Friday. That announcement came at the unveiling of New York City studios with a ribbon cutting ceremony by Mayor Eric Adams. NewsNation offers several blocks of news programming interspersed with talk shows hosted by Chris Cuomo, Dan Abrams, Ashleigh Banfield, Elizabeth Vargas and Leland Vittert.

Compton is the son of the late radio DJ and talk show host Dale Sommers.
