= Jürgen Habermas bibliography =

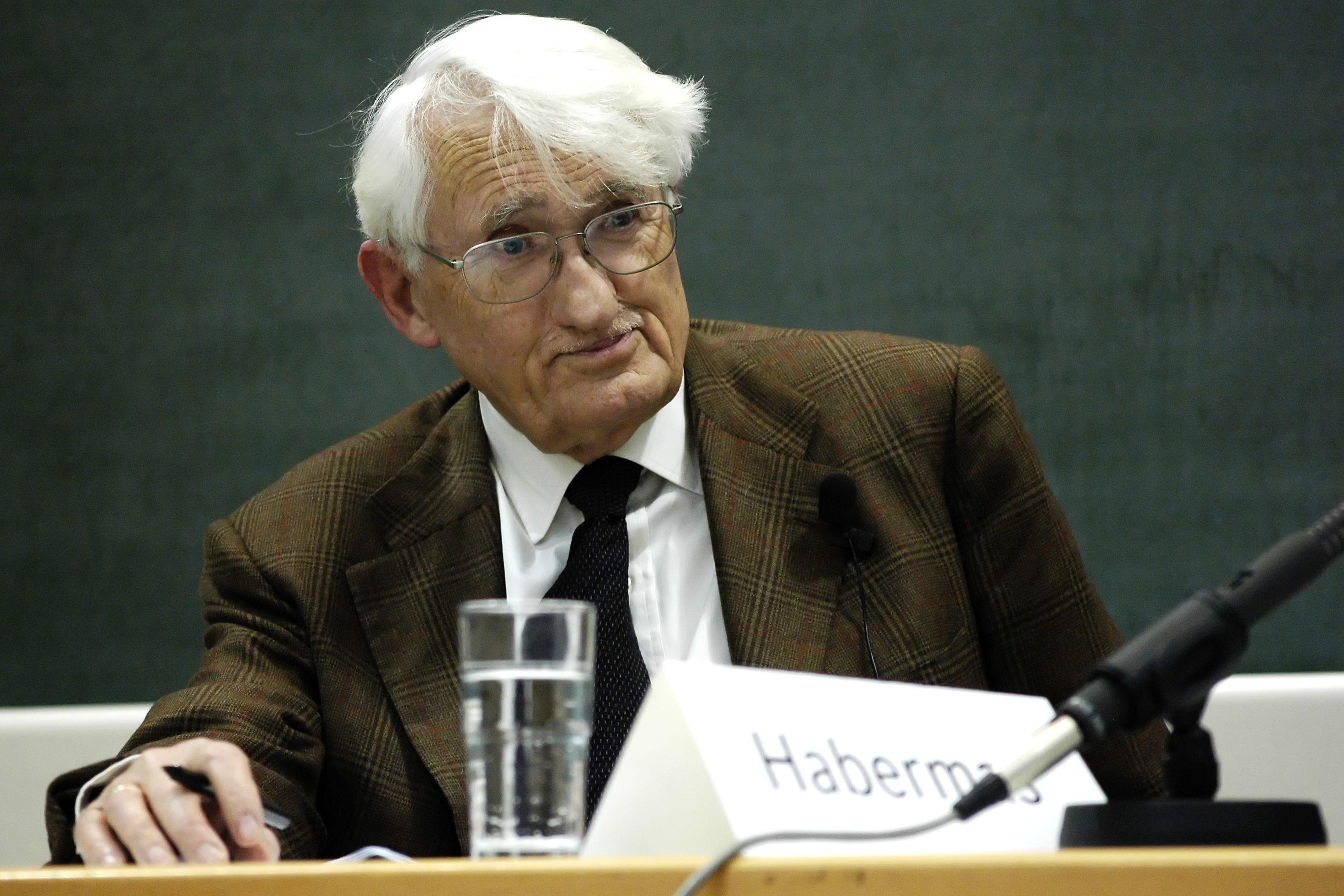
Habermas during a discussion in the Munich School of Philosophy 2008

The works of the German sociologist and philosopher Jürgen Habermas (18 June 1929 - 14 March 2026) include books, papers, contributions to journals, periodicals, newspapers, lectures given at conferences and seminars, reviews of works by other authors, and dialogues and speeches given in various occasions. Working in the tradition of critical theory and pragmatism. Habermas' best known work is perhaps his theory on the concepts of 'communicative rationality' and the 'public sphere'. His work focused on the foundations of social theory and epistemology, the analysis of advanced capitalistic societies and democracy, the rule of law in a critical social-evolutionary context, and contemporary politics—particularly German politics. Habermas's theoretical system is devoted to revealing the possibility of reason, emancipation, and rational-critical communication latent in modern institutions and in the human capacity to deliberate and pursue rational interests.

This list is primarily based on Mapping Habermas from German to English: A Bibliography of Primary Literature 1952-1995 edited by Demetrios Douramanis, Jürgen Habermas: A Bibliography by René Görtzen, and Luca Corchia's Jürgen Habermas. A Bibliography: Works and Studies (1952-2013), a bibliography based on direct consultation of the original editions and their translations, with their internal references; as well as research carried out by other scholars.

The catalog of Habermas production includes books, collections, interviews, prefaces to later editions of his own books, papers, contributions to journals, periodicals, newspapers, lectures given at conferences and seminars, reviews of works by other authors, dialogues and speeches given in various occasions.

Furthermore, Habermas' publications are often collections of writings which have been taken and reordered chronologically in this bibliography. The chronology is determined by the publication dates of Habermas's German language books. Articles that do not appear in these books are included as works in their own right. Insofar as most of the writings collected in Habermas's books find their origin in journals, newspapers, edited books and magazines, or were delivered as lectures or discussion and occasional papers, information on their origin is given in the footnotes.

== Books ==
Title	Original publication	Publisher	English translation	Translator
Das Absolute und die Geschichte: Von der Zwiespältigkeit in Schellings Denken –	1954	Rheinische Friedrich-Wilhelms-Universität, Faculty of Philosophy, Bonn	–	–
Doctoral Dissertation.
Student und Politik: Eine soziologische Untersuchung zum politischen Bewußtsein Frankfurter Studenten –	1961	Neuwied/Berlin: Luchterhand	–	–
Together with Ludwig von Friedeburg, Christoph Oehler, and Friedrich Weltz.
Strukturwandel der Öffentlichkeit: Untersuchungen zu einer Kategorie der bürgerlichen Gesellschaft The Structural Transformation of the Public Sphere	1962	Neuwied/Berlin: Luchterhand	1989	Thomas Burger, with the assistance of Frederick Lawrence
Theorie und Praxis: Sozialphilosophische Studien Revised edition, expanded with new introduction (Note: The last two essays in the 1963 edition: "Ein marxistischer Schelling - Zu Ernst Blochs spekulativen Materialismus," and "Karl Löwiths stoischer Rückzug vom historischen Bewußtsein" were dropped from this edition, and were reprinted in the same year in PPP.) Theory and Practice	1963; 1971	Neuwied/Berlin: Luchterhand; Frankfurt am Main: Suhrkamp Verlag	1973	John Viertel

- —. Zur Logik der Sozialwissenschaften, in Philosophische Rundschau 14, No.5 (February), Tübingen, Mohr, 1967, LSW. Expanded edition 1970 and 1982. Frankfurt am Main: Suhrkamp Verlag
- —. Technik und Wissenschaft als 'Ideologie'. Frankfurt am Main: Suhrkamp Verlag, 1968, TWI.
- —. Erkenntnis und Interesse. Frankfurt am Main: Suhrkamp Verlag, 1968, EI. (With a New Postscript) 1973.

== Works ==
=== 1952 ===
- —. Gottfried Benns neue Stimme, in «Frankfurter Allgemeine Zeitung», 19.6.1952, p. 6.
- —. Im Lichte Heideggers, in «Frankfurter Allgemeine Zeitung», 12.7.1952, p. 12.
- —. Wider den moralpädagogischen Hochmut der Kulturkritik, in «Die Literatur», 13, 15.9.1952, p. 6.
- —. Des Hörspiels Mangel ist seine Chance, in «Frankfurter Allgemeine Zeitung», 15.9.1952, p. 4.
- —. Die akustische Bühne. Hörspielnotizen zu Adamov, Dürrenmatt und Huber, in «Frankfurter Allgemeine Zeitung», 27.11.1952, p. 4.

=== 1953 ===
- —. Der musikalische Stil des Films. Ein Vortrag und zwei Filme von Jean Mitry, in «Frankfurter Allgemeine Zeitung», 19.1.1953, p. 4.
- —. Die Ironie der Holz- und Gipsköpfe. Bei Gelegenheit des Internationalen Puppenspielzyklus in Bonn, in «Frankfurter Allgemeine Zeitung», 29.1.1953, p. 6.
- —. Drei Masken zuviel, in «Frankfurter Hefte», VIII, 3, 1953, pp. 231–234.
- —. Der falsche Prometheus, in «Frankfurter Hefte», VIII, 5, 1953, pp. 398–400.
- —. Der Moloch und die Künste. Gedanken zur Entlarvung der Legende von der technischen Zweckmäßigkeit, in «Frankfurter Allgemeine Zeitung», 30.5.1953; repr. in «Jahresring», 1, 1954, pp. 258–263.
- —. Die farbigen Schatten aus Szetschuan. Notizen zum zweiten Bonner Puppenspielzyklus, in «Frankfurter Allgemeine Zeitung», 14.7.1953, p. 8.
- —. Mit Heidegger gegen Heidegger denken: Zur Veröffentlichung von Vorlesungen aus dem Jahre 1935, in «Frankfurt Allgemeine Zeitung», 25.7.1953: repr. as Martin Heidegger: Zur Veröffentlichung von Vorlesungen aus dem Jahre 1935, in J. Habermas, Philosophisch-politische Profile (PPP), Frankfurt a.M., Suhrkamp, 1971, 19813, pp. 65–71; tr. en. Martin Heidegger: On The Publication of the Lectures of 1935, in «Graduate Faculty Philosophy Journal», VI, 2, 1977, pp. 155–164; repr. in R. Wolin, The Heidegger Controversy: A Critical Reader, New York, Columbia University Press, 1991, pp. 186–197, Cambridge, The MIT Press, 1993, pp. 186–197.
- —. Freiheit, Anruf und Gewissen, in «Frankfurter Allgemeine Zeitung», 29.8.1953.
- —. Iphigenie will nicht sterben. Obeys 'Ein Opfer für Wind' in Bonn, in «Frankfurter Allgemeine Zeitung», 25.11.1953, p. 10.
- —. Von der heilenden Kraft der Kunst. Ein Vortrag von Erich Rothacker in Bonn, in «Frankfurter Allgemeine Zeitung», 29.12.1953, p. 6.

=== 1954 ===
- —. Das Absolute und die Geschichte.Von der Zwiespältigkeit in Schellings Denken (AuG), Doctoral Dissertation, Rheinischen Friedrich-Wilhelms-Universität, Bonn, Bouveir, 1954.
- —. Poesie, entschleiert und eingekellert. Supervielles "Kinderdieb im Bonner Kontrakreis", in «Frankfurter Allgemeine Zeitung», 17.4.1954, p. 2.
- —. Der Hilfsarbeiter wird angelernter Ingenieur. Die Entwicklung vom Fließband zum Prüfstand – Berufsumschichtung durch die Technik, in «Handelsblatt», 55, 14.5.1954, p. 4.
- —. Philosophie ist Risiko [Review of Flügge, "Die sittlichen Grundlagen des Geistes. Hegels existentielle Erkenntnisgesinnung"], in «Frankfurter Allgemeine Zeitung», 19.6.1954.
- —. Sie gehören zum 'Staat' oder zum 'Betrieb'. Die unpersönliche Macht der modernen Bürokratie - Ihre Herkunft und ihre Gefahr, in «Handelsblatt», 11.7.1954.
- —. Beamte müssen Phantasie haben. Gibt es ein Heilmittel gegen die Schwächen der Bürokratie? - Für eine Kontrolle 'von innen', in «Handelsblatt», 25.7.1954.
- —. Die Dialektik der Rationalisierung. Von Pauperismus in Produktion und Konsum, in «Merkur», VIII, 78, 8.1954, pp. 701–724, in J. Habermas, Arbeit – Erkenntnis – Fortschrift. Aufsätze 1954-1970 (AEF), Amsterdam, de Munter, Schwarze Reihe, 10, 1970, pp. 7–30, [Pirate edition]; repr. in Id., Arbeit-Freizeit-Konsum: Frühe Aufsätze (AFK), Gravenhage, Eversdijck, 1973, pp. 3–26 [Pirate edition].
- —. Schelling und die 'Submission unter das Höhere'. Zum 100 Todestag des Philosophen – nicht nur in memoriam, in «Frankfurter Allgemeine Zeitung», 21.8.1954.
- —. "Zweihundert Eigenschaften" für vierzehn Völker. Baisse in nationalen Vorurteilen – Zu einem sozialpsychologischen Versuch mit Berliner Studenten, in «Handelsblatt», 99, 27.8.1954, p. 4.
- —. Mut und Nüchternheit [A Review of H. Plessner, "Zwischen Philosophie und Gesellschaft"], in «Frankfurter Hefte», IX, 9.9.1954, pp. 702–704.
- —. Für und wider den Test. Gegen den Geist der Menschenverachtung, in «Frankfurter Allgemeine Zeitung», 11.9.1954.
- —. "Morgengrauen" – morgen das Grauen, in «Süddeutsche Zeitung», 2–3.10.1954.
- —. Kein Warten auf Gawdos. Herbert Meiers 'Barke von Gawdos' im Bonner Contrakeller, in «Frankfurter Allgemeine Zeitung», 18.10.1954, p. 6.
- —. Automaten und Gesellschaft. Ein Vortragsabend der Deutschen Forschungsgemeinschaft in Godesberg, in «Frankfurter Allgemeine Zeitung», 25.10.1954, p. 6.
- —. Die Masse – das sind wir: Bildung und soziale Stellung kein Schutz gegen den Kollektivismus? – Das Gift der Menschenverachtung, in «Handelsblatt», 126, 29.10.1954, p. 4.
- —. Standpunkt und Existenz [A Review of H. Lipps, "Die Wirk-lichkeit des Menschen"], in «Frankfurter Allgemeine Zeitung», 6.11.1954.
- —. Neun Jahre unter die Lupe. Deutschlands geistige Entwicklung seit 1945. Der Versuch einer Bilanz, in «Handelsblatt», 135, 19.11.1954, p. 4.
- —. Auto fahren. Der Mensch am Lenkrad, in «Frankfurter Allgemeine Zeitung», 27.11.1954.
- —. Irrtum über die Masse. Wider das Gift der Menschenverachtung, in «Wiesbadener Kurier», 27.11.1954
- —. Süden nichts Neues? Italienischer Stil vom Kunsthandwerk zur Industrie - Die Ausstellung 'Forme Nuova in Italia', in «Handelsblatt», 140, 1.12.1954, p. 3.
- —. Der metaphysischen Geheimnisse enterbt [A Review of E. Spranger, "Gedanken zur Daseinsgestaltung"], in «Frankfurter Allgemeine Zeitung», 4.12.1954.
- —. Chemische Ferien vom Ich. Huxleys Umgang mit Meskalin [Review of A. Huxley, "Die Pforten der Wahrnehmung, meine Erfahrung mit Meskalin"], in «Frankfurter Allgemeine Zeitung», 11.12.1954.
- —. Wie an einem Samstagnachmittag. Musik als indirektes Pro-duktionsmittel – Ihr Einfluß auf die Arbeitsstimmung, in «Handelsblatt», 150, 24.12.1954, p. 4.
- —. Ornament und Maschine [A Review of A Review of B. Brehm, "Das Ebenbild"], in «Frankfurter Allgemeine Zeitung», 31.12.1954, p. 23.

=== 1955 ===
- —. Die letzte Phase der Mechanisierung [A Review of J. Diebold, "Die automatische Fabrik"], in «Frankfurter Allgemeine Zeitung», 8.1.1955.
- —. "Ohne mich" auf dem Index, in «Deutsche Studentenzeitung», V, 5, pp. 1–2.
- —. Der Soziologen-Nachwuchs stellt sich vor. Zu einem Treffen in Hamburg unter der Leitung von Professor Schelsky, in «Frankfurter Allgemeine Zeitung», 13.6.1955, p. 10.
- —. Zufriedene Studentin – gedrückter Landarbeiter. Junge Soziologen untersuchen Probleme von heute, in «Handelsblatt», 24.6.1955.
- —. Come back der deutschen Soziologie [A Review of A. Gehlen, H. Schelsky, "Soziologie"; and W. Bernsdorf, F. Bülow (eds.), "Wörterbuch der Soziologie"], in «Frankfurter Allgemeine Zeitung», 23.7.1955.
- —. "Stil" auch für den Alltag. Die "Industrieformung" nutzt und hilft dem Konsumenten, in «Handelsblatt», 111, 23.9.1955, p. 4.
- —. Der Aquinate gegen Hegel [A Review of B. Labebrink, "Hegels dialektische Ontologie und die thomistische Analektik"], in «Frankfurter Allgemeine Zeitung», 7.10.1955, p. 9.
- —. Jeder Mensch ist unbezahlbar, in «Merkur», IX, 92, 10.1955, pp. 994–998.
- —. Der Geist geht zu Fuß... Eine Tagung zum Thema Kulturkonsum, in «Handelsblatt», 28.10.1955.
- —. Marx in Perspektiven, in «Merkur», IX, 94, 12.1955, pp. 1180–1183; repr. in J. Habermas, Arbeit – Erkenntnis – Fortschrift. Aufsätze 1954-1970 (AEF), Amsterdam, de Munter, Schwarze Reihe, 10, 1970, pp. 75–80.
- —. Der Pfahl im Fleische ... Eine verlegene Bemerkung zu Kierkegaards 100. Todestag, in «Frankfurter Allgemeine Zeitung», 12.11.1955.

=== 1956 ===
- —. Der Zerfall der Institutionen (Arnold Gehlen) [Review of A. Gehlen's "Urmensch und Spätkultur"], in «Frankfurter Allgemeine Zei-tung», 7.4.1956; repr. as Arnold Gehlen 1. Der Zerfall der Institutionen, in J. Habermas, Philosophisch-politische Profile (PPP), Frankfurt a.M., Suhrkamp, 1971, 19813, pp. 101–106.
- —. Karl Jaspers über Schelling, in «Frankfurter Allgemeine Zei-tung», 14.1.1956; repr. in J. Habermas, Id., Philosophisch-politische Profile (PPP), Frankfurt a.M., Suhrkamp, 1971,19813, pp. 82–86.
- —. Der Zeitgeist und die Pädagogik, in «Merkur» X, 96, 1.1956, pp. 189–193.
- —. Man möchte sich mitreißen lassen. Feste und Feiern in dieser Zeit, in «Handelsblatt», 21,17.2.1956, p. 4.
- —. Notizen zum Missverhältnis von Kultur und Konsum, in «Merkur», X, 97, 3.1956, pp. 212–228; repr. in J. Habermas, Arbeit – Erkenntnis – Fortschrift. Aufsätze 1954-1970 (AEF), Amsterdam, de Munter, Schwarze Reihe, 10, 1970, pp. 31–46; repr. in Id., Arbeit-Freizeit-Konsum: Frühe Aufsätze (AFK), Gravenhage, Eversdijck, 1973, pp. 27–42.
- —. Deutschland rehabilitiert Freud, in «National Zeitung» 13.5.1956,
- —. Das erste Lächeln. Der Psychiater René A. Spitz über die früheste Kindheit, in «Frankfurter Allgemeine Zeitung», 17.5.1956, p. 12.
- —. Versöhnung von Psychoanalyse und Religion, in «Frankfurter Allgemeine Zeitung», 133, 11.6.1956, p. 8.
- —. Triebschicksal als politisches Schicksal. Zum Abschluss der Vorlesungen über Sigmund Freud an den Universitäten Frankfurt und Heidelberg, in «Frankfurter Allgemeine Zeitung», 162, 14.7.1956, p. 10.
- —. Ludwig Klages – überholt oder unzeitgemäß? Zum Tode des deutschen Philosophen, in «Frankfurter Allgemeine Zeitung», 3.8.1956, p. 8.
- —. Der Verrat und die Maßstäbe. Wenn Jungkonservative alt werden, in «Deutsche Universitätszeitung», II, 19, pp. 8–11.
- —. Illusionen auf dem Heiratsmarkt, in «Merkur», X, 104, 10.1956, pp. 996–1004; repr. in J. Habermas, Arbeit – Erkenntnis – Fortschrift. Aufsätze 1954-1970 (AEF), Amsterdam, de Munter, Schwarze Reihe, 10, 1970, pp. 31–46; repr. in Id., Arbeit-Freizeit-Konsum: Frühe Aufsätze (AFK), Gravenhage, Eversdijck, 1973, pp. 43–53.

=== 1957 ===
- —. Literaturbericht zur philosophischen Diskussion un Marx und den Marxismus, in «Philosophische Rundschau», V, 3–4, 1957, pp. 165–235; repr. as Zur philosophischen Diskussion um Marx und den Marxismus, in J. Habermas, Theorie und Praxis. Sozialphilosophische Studien (TuP), Neuwied/ Berlin, Luchterhand, 1963, pp. 261–335.
- —. Können Konsumenten spielen?, in «Frankfurter Allgemeine Zeitung», 88, 13.4.1957.
- —. Das chronische Leiden der Hochschulreform, in «Merkur», XI, 109, 3.1957, pp. 265–284, in J. Habermas, Protestbewegung und Hochschulreform (PuH), Frankfurt a.M., Suhrkamp, 1969, pp. 51–82, in Id., Kleine politische Scriften I-IV (KPS I-IV), Frankfurt a.M., Suhrkamp, 1981, pp. 13–40.
- —. Der biographische Schleier. Bei Gelegenheit des Stresemann-Filmes notiert, in «Frankfurter Hefte», XII, 5, 5.1957, pp. 357–361.
- —. Konsumkritik – eigens zum Konsumieren, in «Frankfurter Hefte», XII, 9, 9.1957, pp. 641–645; repr. in J. Habermas, Arbeit – Erkenntnis – Fortschrift. Aufsätze 1954-1970 (AEF), Amsterdam, de Munter, Schwarze Reihe, 10, 1970, pp. 47–55; repr. in Id., Arbeit-Freizeit-Konsum: Frühe Aufsätze (AFK), Gravenhage, Eversdijck, 1973, pp. 54–62.

=== 1958 ===
- —. Einleitung: Über den Begriff der politischen Beteiligung, in J. Habermas, L. von Friedeburg, C. Oehler, F. Weltz, Student und Politik. Eine soziologische Untersuchung zum politischen Bewußtsein Frankfurter Studenten (SuP), Neuwied/Berlin, Luchterhand, 1961, pp. 13–55; repr. in J. Habermas, Arbeit – Erkenntnis – Fortschrift. Aufsätze 1954-1970 (AEF), Amsterdam, de Munter, Schwarze Reihe, 10, 1970, pp. 258–303; repr. as Zum Begriff der politischen Beteiligung, in Id., Kultur und Kritik. Verstreute Aufsätze (KuK), Frankfurt a.M., Suhrkamp, 1973, pp. 9–60.
- —. Jaspers und die Gestalten der Wahrheit: Geschichtsphilosophische Betrachtung zu einer Geschichte der Philosophie, zum 75. Geburtstag von Karl Jaspers, in «Frankfurter Allgemeine Zeitung», 22.2.1958; repr. as Karl Jaspers. Die Gestalten der Wahrheit, in J. Habermas, Philosophisch-politische Profile (PPP), Frankfurt a.M., Suhrkamp, 1971, 19813, pp. 96–100; tr. en. by F.G. Lawrence, Karl Jaspers: the Figures of Truth, in Id., Philosophical-Political Profiles (PPP), Cambridge (Mass.), MIT Press, 1983, pp. 45–52.
- —. Der befremdliche Mythos: Reduktion oder Evokation? [Review of E. Topitsch, "Vom Ursprung und Ende der Metaphysik"; W. Bröckner, "Dialektik, Positivismus, Mythologie"; B. Liebrucks, "Sprache und Mythos; repr. in J. Habermas, Id., Arbeit – Erkenntnis – Fortschrift. Aufsätze 1954-1970 (AEF), Amsterdam, de Munter, Schwarze Reihe, 10, 1970, pp. 149-163.
- —. Für und Wider. Der Mensch zwischen den Apparaten, in «Süddeutsche Zeitung», 6–7.9.1958.
- —. Sigmund Freud – der Aufklärer. Festakt in Frankfurt zum 100. Geburtstag/Wenig Anteilnahme in Wien, in «Frankfurter Allgemeine Zeitung», 7.5.1958.
- —. Unruhe erste Bürgerpflicht, in «Diskus», 5, 6.1958.
- —. Soziologische Notizen zum Verhältnis von Arbeit und Freizeit, in G. Funke (ed.), Konkrete Vernunft. Festschrift für E. Rothacker, Bonn, Bouvier, 1958, pp. 219–231; repr. in Plessner H., Bock H.-E., Grupe O. (eds.), Sport und Leibeserziehung. Sozialwissenschaftliche, pädagogische und medizinische Beiträge, München, Piper Verlag, 1967, pp. 28–46; repr. in J. Habermas, Arbeit – Erkenntnis – Fortschrift. Aufsätze 1954-1970 (AEF), Amsterdam, de Munter, Schwarze Reihe, 10, 1970, pp. 56–74; repr. in Id., Arbeit-Freizeit-Konsum: Frühe Aufsätze (AFK), Gravenhage, Eversdijck, 1973, pp. 54–62.
- —. Der Verschleierte Schrecken. Bemerkungen zu C. F. von Weizsäckers "Mit der Bombe leben", in «Frankfurter Hefte», XIII, 8, 8.1958, pp. 530–532; repr. in J. Habermas, Arbeit – Erkenntnis – Fortschrift. Aufsätze 1954-1970 (AEF), Amsterdam, de Munter, Schwarze Reihe, 10, 1970, pp. 92–96.
- —. Philosophische Anthropologie. Ein Lexikonartikel, in A. Diemer, I. Frenzel (eds.), Fischer-Lexikon Philosophie, Frankfurt a.M., Fisher, 1958, pp. 18–35; repr. in J. Habermas, Arbeit – Erkenntnis – Fortschrift. Aufsätze 1954-1970 (AEF), Amsterdam, de Munter, Schwarze Reihe, 10, 1970, pp. 164–180; repr. in Id., Kultur und Kritik. Verstreute Aufsätze (KuK), Frankfurt a.M., Suhrkamp, 1973, pp. 89–111.

=== 1959 ===
- —. Die große Wirkung: Eine chronistische Anmerkung zu Martin Heideggers 70. Geburtstag, in «Frankfurter Allgemeine Zeitung», 26.9.1959; repr. as Martin Heidegger. Die Große Wirkung, in J. Habermas, Philosophisch-politische Profile (PPP), Frankfurt a.M., Suhrkamp, 1971,19813, pp. 72–81; tr. en. by F.G. Lawrence, Martin Heidegger: The Great Influence, in Id., Philosophical-Political Profiles (PPP), Cambridge (Mass.), MIT Press, 1983, pp. 53–60.
- —. Martin Heidegger: Eine anderer Mythos des 20. Jahrhunderts, [Review of W. Bröcker, "Dialektik, Positivismus, Mythologie"; and P. Fürstenau, "Heidegger, das Gefüge seines Denkens"], in «Frankfurter Hefte», XIV, 3, 3.1959, pp. 206–209.
- —. Ein anderer Mythos des Zwanzigsten Jahrhunderts, in «Frankfurter Hefte» XIV, 3, 3.1959, pp. 206–209; repr. in J. Habermas, Arbeit – Erkenntnis – Fortschrift. Aufsätze 1954-1970 (AEF), Amsterdam, de Munter, Schwarze Reihe, 10, 1970, pp. 97–102.
- —. Brief an H. Mörchen, in «Frankfurter Hefte» XIV, 7, 7.1959, p. 537.
- —. Die Grenze in uns – Helmuth Plessner: "Die verspätete Nation", in «Frankfurter Hefte», XIV, 11, 11.1959, pp. 826–831; repr. in J. Habermas, Arbeit – Erkenntnis – Fortschrift. Aufsätze 1954-1970 (AEF), Amsterdam, de Munter, Schwarze Reihe, 10, 1970, pp. 103–111; as Helmuth Plessner. Die verspätete Nation, repr. in Id., Philosophisch-politische Profile (PPP), Frankfurt a.M., Suhrkamp, 1971,19813, pp. 127–136.
- —. Zum Einfluß von Schul- und Hochschulbildung auf das politische Bewußtsein von Studenten, Berlin, Soziologie und moderne Gesellschaft: Verhandlungen des 14. Deutschen Soziologentages, 20–24.5.1959; in «Verhandlungen des Deutschen Soziologentages», 14, p. 217 ss.; repr. in L. Friedeburg von (ed.), Jugend in der modernen Gesellschaft, Köln, Kiepenheuer & Witsch, 1969, pp. 424–431.
- —. Konservativer Geist – und die modernistischen Folgen. Zum Reformplan für die deutsche Schule, in «Der Monat», XII, 133, 1959, pp. 41–50; repr. in J. Habermas, Kleine politische Scriften I-IV (KPS I-IV), Frankfurt a.M., Suhrkamp, 1981, pp. 41–57.
- —. Verrufener Fortschritt – verkanntes Jahrhundert. Zur Kritik an der Geschichtsphilosophie, in «Frankfurter Hefte» XIV, 3, 3.1959, pp. 206–209; repr. in «Merkur», XIV, 147, 5.1960, pp. 468–477; repr. in J. Habermas, Arbeit – Erkenntnis – Fortschrift. Aufsätze 1954-1970 (AEF), Amsterdam, de Munter, Schwarze Reihe, 10, 1970, pp. 112–121; repr. in Id., Philosophisch-politische Profile (PPP), Frankfurt a.M., Suhrkamp, 1971,19813, pp. 435–444; repr. in Id., Kultur und Kritik. Verstreute Aufsätze (KuK), Frankfurt a.M., Suhrkamp, 1973, pp. 355–364.

=== 1960 ===
- —. Ein marxistischer Schelling – Zu Ernst Blochs spekulativen Materialismus, in «Merkur», XIV, 153, 11.1960, pp. 1078–1091; repr. in J. Habermas, Theorie und Praxis. Sozialphilosophische Studien (TuP), Neuwied/ Berlin, Luchterhand, 1963, pp. 336–351; repr. as Ernst Bloch. Ein marxistischer Schelling, in Id., Politik, Kunst, Religion. Essays über zeitgenössische Philosophen (PKR), Stuttgart, Reclam, 1978, pp. 11–32; repr. in Id, Philosophisch-politische Profile (PPP), Frankfurt a.M., Suhrkamp, 1971,19813, pp. 141–159; tr. en. by F.G. Lawrence, Ernst Bloch: a Marxist Schelling, in Id., Philosophical-Political Profiles (PPP), Cambridge (Mass.), MIT Press, 1983, pp. 61–78.
- —. Über das Verhältnis von Politik und Moral, Lecture at 6th Deutscher Kongreß für Philosophie, München, 1960, in H. Kuhn, F. Wiedmann (eds.) Das Problem der Ordnung, Meisenheim a.G., Hain, 1962, pp. 94–117.
- —. Zwischen Philosophie und Wissenschaft: Marxismus als Kritik, Lecture at „Zürcher Philosophischen Gesellschaft", 12.1960; in J. Habermas, Theorie und Praxis. Sozialphilosophische Studien (TuP), Neuwied/ Berlin, Luchterhand, 1963, pp. 162–214, Frankfurt a.M., Suhrkamp, 1971, pp. 228–289; tr. en. by Sh. Weber Nicholsen, Between Philosophy and Science: Marxism as Critique, in Id., Theory and Practice (TuP), London, Beacon Press, 1973, pp. 195–252; repr.part. in Id., Jürgen Habermas on Society and Politics: A Reader, ed. by S. Seidman, Boston, Beacon Press, 1989, pp. 47–54.

=== 1968 ===
- —. Eine neue Legitimation der Herrschaft. Technik und Wissenschaft als Ideologie. Radio lecture. Hessischer Rundfunk, Abendstudio, July 9, 1968.

== Notes and references ==
Notes

Bibliography

- Corchia, Luca (February 2016). Jürgen Habermas. A Bibliography. 1. Works of Jürgen Habermas (1952-2015). Department of Political Science, University of Pisa (Italy)..
- Corchia, Luca (February 2016). Jürgen Habermas. A bibliography. 2. Studies on Jürgen Habermas (1962-2015). Department of Political Science, University of Pisa (Italy)..
- Corchia, Luca (2013). Jürgen Habermas. A Bibliography: works and studies (1952-2013). Pisa (IT), Arnus University Books. ISBN 978-88-6528-186-4.
- Crone, Michael, ed. (1992). Vertreter der Frankfurter Schule in den Hörfunkprogrammen 1950–1992. Hessischer Rundfunkt.
- Douramanis, Demetrios, ed. (1995). Mapping Habermas from German to English: A Bibliography of Primary Literature 1952-1995 (PDF). edition Eurotext. ISBN 978-0-646-25815-7.
- Görtzen, René (1990). "Jürgen Habermas: A Bibliography". In Rasmussen, David M. (ed.). Reading Habermas. Blackwell. ISBN 978-0-631-15274-3.
