= On Balance with Leland Vittert =

American editorial TV program

- Genre: News program
- Presented by: Leland Vittert
- Country of origin: United States
- Original language: English

Production
- Executive producer: Federico Quadrani
- Running time: 60 minutes
- Production company: Nexstar Media Group

Original release
- Network: NewsNation
- Release: July 19, 2021 – present

On Balance with Leland Vittert is an American news analysis show aired on NewsNation and hosted by Leland Vittert at 8 pm CT. The show first aired on July 19, 2021 after Vittert left Fox News. The series features analysis and opinions on current news topics while frequently showing views from guest speakers.
