= Dittert =

Dittert is a surname. Notable people with the surname include:

- Annette Dittert (born 1962), German author, filmmaker, correspondent, and journalist
- Bernd Dittert (born 1961), German cyclist

== See also ==
- Ditter
- Vittert
