= Chicagoland Television =

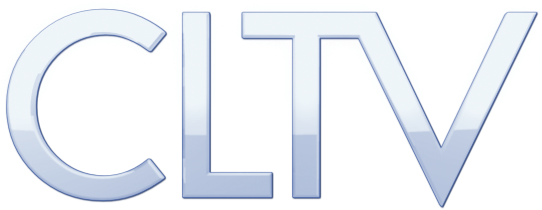
- Country: United States
- Broadcast area: Chicago metropolitan area, parts of northern Illinois and northwestern Indiana
- Headquarters: WGN Studios, 2501 W Bradley Place, Chicago, Illinois

Programming
- Language: English
- Picture format: 1080i (HDTV); 480i (SDTV)

Ownership
- Owner: Nexstar Media Group
- Sister channels: WGN-TV; WGN (AM); WGN America (now NewsNation; defunct)

History
- Launched: January 1, 1993; 33 years ago
- Closed: December 31, 2019; 6 years ago
- Replaced by: NewsNation

Chicagoland Television (branded on-air as CLTV) was an American regional cable news television channel located in Chicago, Illinois. The channel served the Chicago metropolitan area.

The channel was formerly owned by Tribune Media (through its Tribune Broadcasting subsidiary) since its debut; it was one of three flagship media properties owned by the company, alongside radio station WGN (720 AM) and CLTV's news partners, then independent, now CW station WGN-TV (channel 9) until 2019 after Nexstar Media Group acquired Tribune Media. The Chicago Tribune, owned by Tribune Publishing since Tribune's publishing assets were spun-off in summer 2014, along with Tribune's suburban partners, continued to contribute some CLTV content until its closure. CLTV operated from the studios of WGN-TV on Bradley Place in Chicago's North Center neighborhood.

Nexstar Media Group announced on December 16, 2019, that it would shut down CLTV on December 31, 2019, which occurred at 6:00 p.m. CST.

== History ==
The channel began operations on January 1, 1993, originally broadcasting out of studios located in the Chicago suburb of Oak Brook. On February 4, 2009, the Tribune Company announced that it would combine CLTV's operations with the company's flagship television station WGN-TV, though CLTV would continue to operate as a standalone cable news channel. As a result of the integration of the channel's operations, CLTV relocated from its Oak Brook studio to WGN's Bradley Place studios on the northwest side of Chicago. The move became official on August 28, 2009, when editorial control of the cable channel was also turned over to WGN-TV's news department.

Prior to this, Tribune integrated CLTV's weather operations with channel 9, and WGN radio entered into a content agreement with WGN-TV to provide weather forecasts for that station. Upon the completion of the merger, CLTV received a new on-air logo, implemented new graphics based on those used by WGN-TV for that station's newscasts and upgraded to high definition broadcasts.

In July 2009, CLTV laid off more than 20 staffers, including on-air personalities Aaron Baskerville, Randi Belisomo and Regina Waldrop. Other staffers cut were in sales and production.

== Programming ==
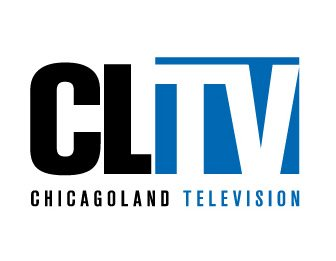
Former logo, used from August 28, 2009, to January 2015

At the time of its closure, CLTV aired live news on weekdays continuously 4:00 a.m. to 9:00 a.m., 2:00 p.m. to 3:00 p.m., and 7:00 p.m. to 9:00 a.m. (also weekends), with half-hour updates at 10:00 a.m. (also weekends), 12:30 p.m. and 1:30 a.m. (also weekends). On weekends live news aired from 4:00 a.m. to 5:30 a.m., 7:30 a.m. to 9:00 a.m., 12:00 p.m. to 4:00 p.m., 7:00 p.m. to 9:00 p.m., and 10:00 p.m. to midnight. All news broadcasts were structured into a traditional wheel format of news, traffic and transit, weather, sports, entertainment and feature reports. Any programming was subject to interruption due to breaking local news events or significant national events that necessitated longer-form coverage.

Other programs featured on CLTV included:

- Politics Tonight, a nightly political discussion program hosted by WGN-TV political editor Paul Lisnek, airing weeknights at 5:30 p.m. (repeats at 10:00 p.m.);
- Rebroadcasts of WGN-TV newscasts including one-hour of that station's two-hour midday (the noon hour repeating at 1 p.m. each weekday), weekend morning (the 8 a.m. hour repeating at 9 a.m. on Saturdays and Sundays), 9 and 10 p.m. (repeats at 10:30 and 11:30 p.m. weeknights, respectively plus the 9 p.m. repeat at 10 p.m. Sundays), the Saturday 5 p.m. newscast (which airs at 6 p.m. Saturdays) and bi-weekly public affairs programs Adelante, Chicago and People to People;
- Special live half-hour editions of WGN-TV's 9 p.m. newscast that are broadcast exclusively on CLTV during instances in which WGN-TV telecasts an NBA, NHL or Major League Baseball event being held on the West Coast that is scheduled for a 9 p.m. CT start time locally (an additional half-hour newscast airs live on WGN-TV following the game). CLTV began airing these occasional broadcasts on July 8, 2010;
- Weekend rebroadcasts of non-news programs produced for WGN-TV including food and cultural program Chicago's Best, lifestyle program Living Healthy Chicago and the DIY/home project program The Weekend Workbench;
- Limited paid programming during early overnight periods
- CLTV SportsFeed, hosted by Josh Frydman and Jarrett Payton, which airs Sundays-Thursdays at 6 p.m. and repeats at 9 p.m.
- Live hour-long simulcasts of The Steve Cochran Show (weekday mornings at 9 a.m.) and The Roe Conn Show (weekdays at 3 p.m.) from sister station 720 WGN Radio

Some sports programming also has been featured on the channel including:

- Chicago Rush Arena Football League games (until 2013)
- Telecasts of select DePaul University college basketball games

In addition, the channel was used in the past as an overflow feed for regional sports network Comcast SportsNet Chicago (now Chicago Sports Network; branded technically as CSN+ in order to alleviate sports overflows with CSN Chicago's properties). CLTV was also used during the existence of SportsChannel and Fox Sports Net Chicago as the overflow feeds of those channels before the launch of CSN Chicago. By the second quarter of 2010, Comcast's Chicago systems transitioned to digital-only transmission of its channel lineup (requiring a digital converter box or CableCard-compliant receiver to receive programming), and NBCSC+ has been transitioned to its own channel, along with a NBCSC+HD feed.

=== Partnerships with other Tribune Company properties ===
Due to CLTV's ownership by the Tribune Company (and its successor, Nexstar), the channel shared content and reporting from other news operations run by the company. News footage is shared extensively between CLTV and WGN-TV. All of CLTV's weather coverage is provided by WGN-TV. Columnists from the Chicago Tribune (as mentioned above, now separately owned since mid-2014) also provide in-depth reporting for many feature stories seen on CLTV. Metromix, a joint venture between tronc and the Gannett Company that provides local arts and cultural coverage and is available as the cultural section in the Tribune, produced Metromix Weekend for CLTV. The primetime program initially aired on a nightly basis until 2008, when it was relegated to Thursdays and Fridays, with repeats during the weekend (the program is currently on hiatus).

== Availability ==
Before its closure, CLTV reached an estimated 1.8 million households, making it one of the most widely distributed regional cable news channels in the United States. The channel had been exclusively available on Comcast (and its forerunners AT&T Broadband, MediaOne and TCI) until October 2009, when RCN started to carry CLTV after Tribune struck a new carriage agreement with Comcast that removed the channel's exclusivity to that provider, enabling CLTV to appear on additional providers in the Chicago area. Three months later on January 19, 2010, Comcast began offering CLTV on digital cable in the company's Rockford and South Bend service areas. The SportsChannel/Fox Sports Net and Comcast SportsNet overflow content was not exclusive before October 2009, and was used on other systems that did not carry CLTV. CLTV was unavailable to WOW!, AT&T U-verse, DirecTV, Dish Network, and Verizon Fios subscribers in the Chicago market.

== Notable personalities ==
Anchors

- Jackie Bange – weekend evenings

Weather team

- Tom Skilling – WGN-TV chief meteorologist; weeknights

Reporters

- Nancy Loo – general assignment reporter (now at NewsNation)
- Dean Richards – entertainment reporter

Sports

- Gail Fischer – longtime Chicago-area sports reporter
