= Franz Baumann =

German former United Nations official

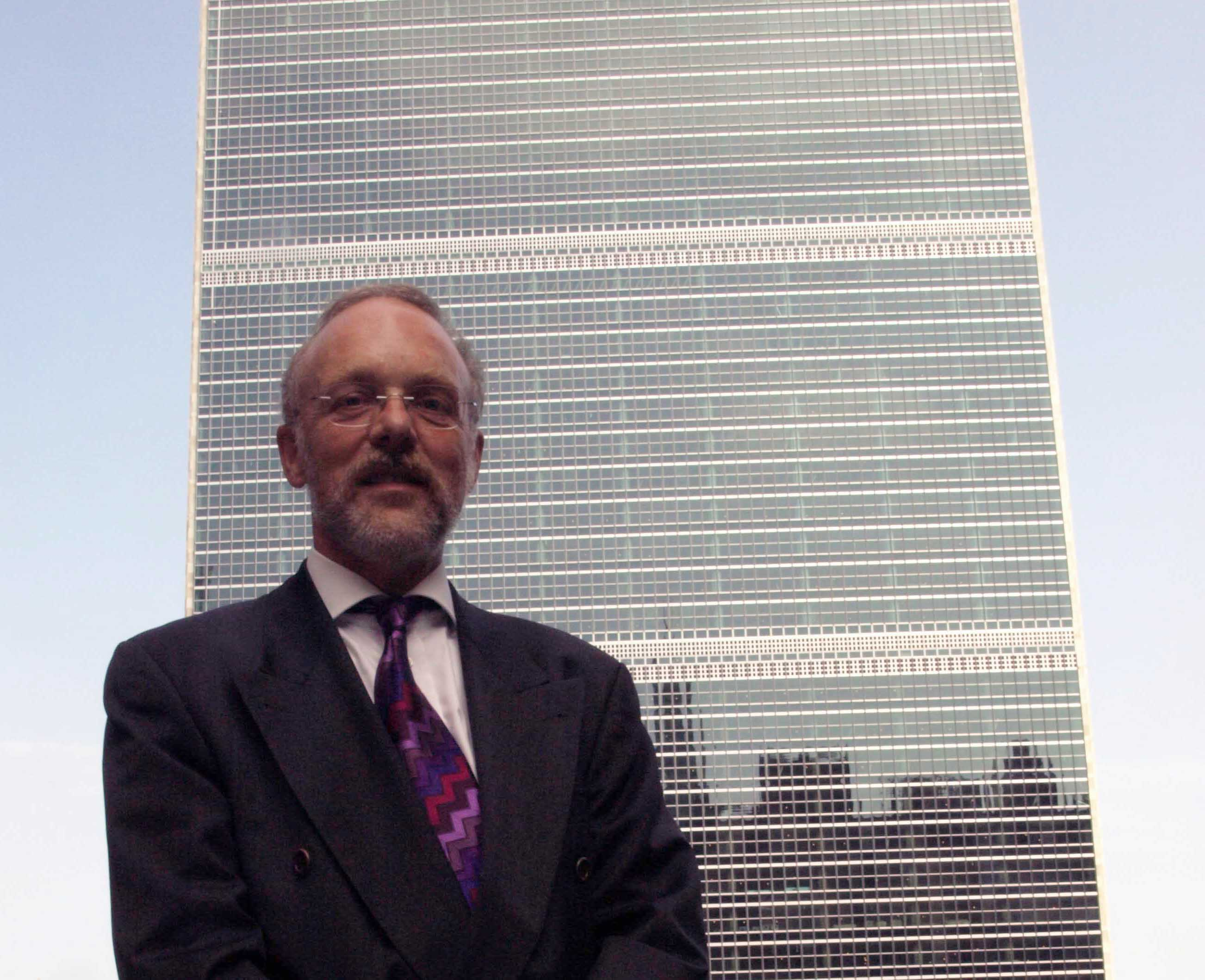
Franz Baumann

Franz Baumann (born 23 September 1953) is a German former United Nations official who, until the end of 2015, served as Assistant Secretary-General and United Nations Special Adviser on Environment and Peace Operations at the United Nations Secretariat in New York. From 2017 to 2021, he was a visiting research professor at New York University (Graduate School of Arts and Science, Program in International Relations) and is now a visiting researcher at Georgetown University in Washington D.C.

== Biography ==
Baumann was born in Schramberg, where he received his Abitur in 1973 from Gymnasium Schramberg. He then studied social sciences and management at the University of Konstanz, specializing in international management, and in 1975 studied history of art at the University of Bristol, in the United Kingdom. He obtained his degree in public administration in 1979 from the University of Konstanz and went on to obtain a doctorate in political science in 1992 from Carleton University in Ottawa, Ontario, Canada. His wife, Barbara Gibson, was a Canadian diplomat. She served from 2004 to 2008 as ambassador to the Organization for Security and Co-operation in Europe in Vienna, in 2015 as Deputy Secretary-General and in 2016 as Secretary-General of ICM, the Independent Commission on Multilateralism (ICM) in New York.

Their daughter was born in 2000.

== Career ==
Baumann worked for the European Parliament in Luxembourg from 1976, in 1979 at the European Commission in Brussels and in 1980 for Siemens in Munich.

He began his career with the United Nations in 1980, serving from 1980 to 1982 as an associate expert in Nigeria for the United Nations Development Programme (UNDP) and the United Nations Industrial Development Organization (UNIDO). He then worked in various departments at the United Nations Secretariat, including those of management and peacekeeping, and in the Office of the Secretary-General. In 1993 he was chief administrative officer of the joint United Nations/Organization of American States Human Rights Monitoring Mission in Haiti (MICIVIH).

In 2002 he was appointed director for management of the United Nations Office at Vienna (UNOV), in 2004 deputy director-general of UNOV, in 2006 deputy executive director of the United Nations Office on Drugs and Crime (UNODC) and in 2007 acting director of the United Nations Office for Outer Space Affairs (UNOOSA).

In 2009 he was appointed assistant secretary-general for General Assembly and conference management at the United Nations Secretariat. In September 2014 he became senior deployment coordinator for Umoja, an enterprise resource planning system. and in September 2015 special advisor on environment and peace operations.

He is the President Emeritus of the Academic Council on the United Nations System, an Executive Editor of Environment: Science and Policy for Sustainable Development and a member of the Board of Advisers of the Centre for United Nations Studies at the University of Buckingham (England).

== Publications (partial selection) ==
- "Wie weit half der Marshall-Plan? Das europäische Wiederaufbauprogramm in kritischer Beleuchtung." In: Damals. 8. Jahrgang, Mai 1976.
- "Plädoyer gegen eine Verweigerung" In: Forum Europa. Dezember 1978/Januar 1979.
- "Die Regionalisierung Belgiens: Arithmetik eines Sprachenstreites." (mit Jan Ulrich Clauss). In: Aufstand in der Provinz. Campus Verlag, Frankfurt/ New York 1980, ISBN 3-593-32803-8.
- The bureaucratic State and economic Development in Nigeria. Doctoral Dissertation. Carleton University, Ottawa 1992.
- "Ein pragmatischer Idealist: Würdigung des Nobelpreisträgers Kofi Annan." In: Aufbau. 25. Oktober 2001.
- "Die Generalsanierung des UN-Amtssitzes" (Capital Master Plan). In: Vereinte Nationen. Dezember 2004, p. 206f. online .(PDF; 2,4 MB)
- "Warum ist Afrika unterentwickelt? Das Beispiel Nigeria." In: Mut. Nr. 533, April 2012, pp. 22–44
- "Coexistence of Languages at the United Nations." In: Le jour. Université de Saint Joseph, Beirut. April 2012, pp. 5–10 online(PDF; 23,1 MB)
- "Die kurze Renaissance der VN-Friedensmissionen nach der Eiszeit des Kalten Krieges." In: Des Friedens General. Ekkehard Griep (Hrsg.): Herder Verlag, Freiburg/ Basel/ Wien 2013, ISBN 978-3-451-30743-0.
- "Die Vereinten Nationen. Eine Innenansicht der Schwierigkeiten, Frieden zu schaffen." In: Mut. Nr. 554, März 2014.
- "The Principle of Hope." Review of Governing the World? Addressing 'Problems without Passports' by Thomas G. Weiss. In: Academic Council on the United Nations System, 21.10.2014 online
- "Die Vereinten Nationen: Wertvoll aber schwierig." In: Ekkehard Griep (Hrsg.): Wir sind UNO - Deutsche bei den Vereinten Nationen. Herder Verlag, Freiburg/Basel/Wien 2016, ISBN 978-3-495-31138-7
- "UN Bureaucracy? No, Thanks." In PassBlue, 14.5.2016; online
- "Das Sekretariat der Vereinten Nationen: Unabhängig, effizient, kompetent?" In: Der (europäische) Föderalist (17.6.2016); online
- "The United Nations Secretariat: Independent, efficient, competent?" In: Der (europäische) Föderalist (17.6.2016); online
- "A sorry state of affairs: The UN Secretariat has no Climate Plan." In: PassBlue (2 August 2016); online
- "UN Management - An Oxymoron?" In: Global Governance (Volume 22, No. 4, Oct. – Dec. 2016)
- "New Approaches to the UN in a Changing International System". In: IDN-InDepthNews UN Insider (12.12. 2016) online
- "Populism - the Morbid Symptom of a Political Crisis". In: IDN-InDepthNews UN Insider (8 March 2017); online
- "Fabulous, Tragic Kurt Tucholsky" In: The Los Angeles Review of Books, (19 August 2017) online
- "Populismus: Reflex einer gesellschaftlichen Verunsicherung und Symptom einer politischen Krise". In: Mut Nr. 591, July/August 2017.
- "As UN Climate Talks Convene, the Earth Veers Toward Catastrophe." In PassBlue, 2 November 2017;online
- "Present at the Destruction: Humanity’s Success in Ruining Nature". Review of Jeff Goodell’s, The Water will Come: Rising Seas, Sinking Cities, and the Remaking of the Civilized World (New York: Little, Brown & Co, 2017). In: Los Angeles Review of Books, (21 February 2018); online
- "Climate Policy is not Rocket Science: It is much more difficult". TEDx Talk (22 February 2018); online;also on youtube
- "The Systemic Challenge of Global Heating." In: International Politics Reviews, Volume 6, Issue 2 (1.10.2018), pp. 134–144; doi:10.1057/s41312-018-0065-5
- "To Save the Earth, Deepen Incentives for a Carbon-Free World." In: PassBlue, (6.10.2018); online
- "Why would you want to be German?" In Los Angeles Review of Books, (7.3.2019); online
- With William J. Ripple and Dominick A. DellaSala,"The Green New Deal: Finally Climate Policy informed by Science." In Climate Home News, (18.3.2019); online
- "Climate Change: The Problem from Hell." In Los Angeles Review of Books, (9.6.2019); online
- "Global Heating: too big for politics?" Keynote at OxPeace 2019: Peace in the Anthropocene, held at St. John’s College Oxford, 18 May 2019; online and here
- „Wissen führt nicht zwangsläufig zum Handeln.“ Deutsche Universitätszeitung (DUZ), 28. April 2020;https://www.duz.de/beitrag/!/id/789/wissen-fuehrt-nicht-zwangslaeufig-zum-handeln
- "Will the UN survive to celebrate its 100th Birthday?“ Exchange with Chris Ankersen, Pairagraph, September 2020; https://pairagraph.com/dialogue/f47ba870e06d4df2b0cccef483592d82
- “Sounding the Climate Alarm: Scientists and Politics.” In Conservation Science and Advocacy for a Planet in Peril: Speaking Truth to Power, Dominick DellaSala (ed.), Elsevier (New York-Amsterdam, 2021); ISBN 9780128129883
- "Political Genius flying at low altitude,” Los Angeles Review of Books, 30 October 2021; https://lareviewofbooks.org/article/political-genius-flying-at-low-altitude/
- "That Plan from Rio: The Promise and Limits of Multilateral Climate Governance." Social Research: An International Quarterly, Vol 90, no. 4 (2023), https://doi.org/10.1353/sor.2023.a916349
- "Multilateral Climate Governance: its Promises and Limits,“ Global Governance: A Review of Multilateralism and International Organizations, Vol 30 (2) 21 August 2024; https://doi.org/10.1163/19426720-03002010
