= Charlotte Lane =

American politician (born 1947)

Chair of the West Virginia Public Service Commission
- Incumbent
- Assumed office July 1, 2019
- Appointed by: Jim Justice
- Preceded by: Michael Albert

Member of the United States International Trade Commission
- In office August 27, 2003 – December 2011
- Appointed by: George W. Bush
- Succeeded by: David S. Johanson

Member of the West Virginia House of Delegates
- In office 2017–2018
- Succeeded by: Doug Skaff
- Constituency: 35th district
- In office 1990–1992
- Constituency: 23rd district
- In office 1979–1980
- Constituency: 17th district

Personal details
- Born: August 12, 1947 (age 78)
- Party: Republican
- Education: Marshall University (AB); West Virginia University (JD)

Charlotte R. Lane (born August 12, 1947) is an American attorney and politician from the state of West Virginia. She is a member of the Republican Party.

== Early life and education ==
Lane is a native of Pleasants County, West Virginia. She moved to Charleston, West Virginia, in 1973. Lane earned a Bachelor of Arts degree in political science and journalism from Marshall University and a Juris Doctor from the West Virginia University College of Law.

== Career ==
Lane was originally elected to West Virginia House of Delegates in 1978 in the 17th district, and would later serve throughout the 1990s and was later appointed as chair the West Virginia Public Service Commission. In 1987, she served as the United States attorney on an interim basis. In 2004, President George W. Bush appointed Lane to the United States International Trade Commission.

Lane ran for West Virginia's 2nd congressional district in the 2014 elections, but lost the Republican primary election to Alex Mooney.

== Personal life ==
Lane was diagnosed with multiple sclerosis in 1981.

== Electoral history ==
1988 West Virginia Supreme Court of Appeals election
Party	Candidate	Votes	%
Democratic	Margaret Workman	363,458	33.96%
Democratic	Thomas B. Miller (incumbent)	346,391	32.36%
Republican	Charlotte Lane	210,473	19.67%
Republican	Jeniver Jones	149,920	14.01%
Total votes		1,070,242	100.00%
Democratic hold			
Democratic hold			

November 5, 1996 West Virginia Attorney General election
Party	Candidate	Votes	%
Democratic	Darrell McGraw (incumbent)	295,288	51.08%
Republican	Charlotte Lane	282,838	48.92%
Total votes		578,126	100.00%
Democratic hold			

West Virginia House of Delegates District 35 election, 2016
Party	Candidate	Votes	%
Republican	Moore Capito	14,822	16.67%
Democratic	Andrew Byrd (incumbent)	13,546	15.23%
Republican	Eric Nelson (incumbent)	11,881	13.36%
Republican	Charlotte Lane	10,505	11.81%
Republican	Keith Pauley	10,251	11.53%
Democratic	Ben Adams	9,899	11.13%
Democratic	Thornton Cooper	9,404	10.57%
Democratic	Benjamin M. Sheridan	8,628	9.70%
Total votes		88,936	100.00%
Republican hold			
Democratic hold			
Republican hold			
Republican hold			

West Virginia House of Delegates District 35 election, 2018
Party	Candidate	Votes	%
Democratic	Doug Skaff	13,202	14.93%
Democratic	Andrew Byrd (incumbent)	13,038	14.75%
Republican	Moore Capito (incumbent)	12,729	14.40%
Republican	Eric Nelson (incumbent)	11,765	13.31%
Republican	Charlotte Lane (incumbent)	10,309	11.66%
Democratic	Renate Pore	10,165	11.50%
Democratic	James P. Robinette	9,444	10.68%
Republican	Edward R. Burgess	7,767	8.78%
Total votes		88,419	100.00%
Democratic gain from Republican			
Democratic hold			
Republican hold			
Republican hold			
