= Laura Ingle =

American journalist

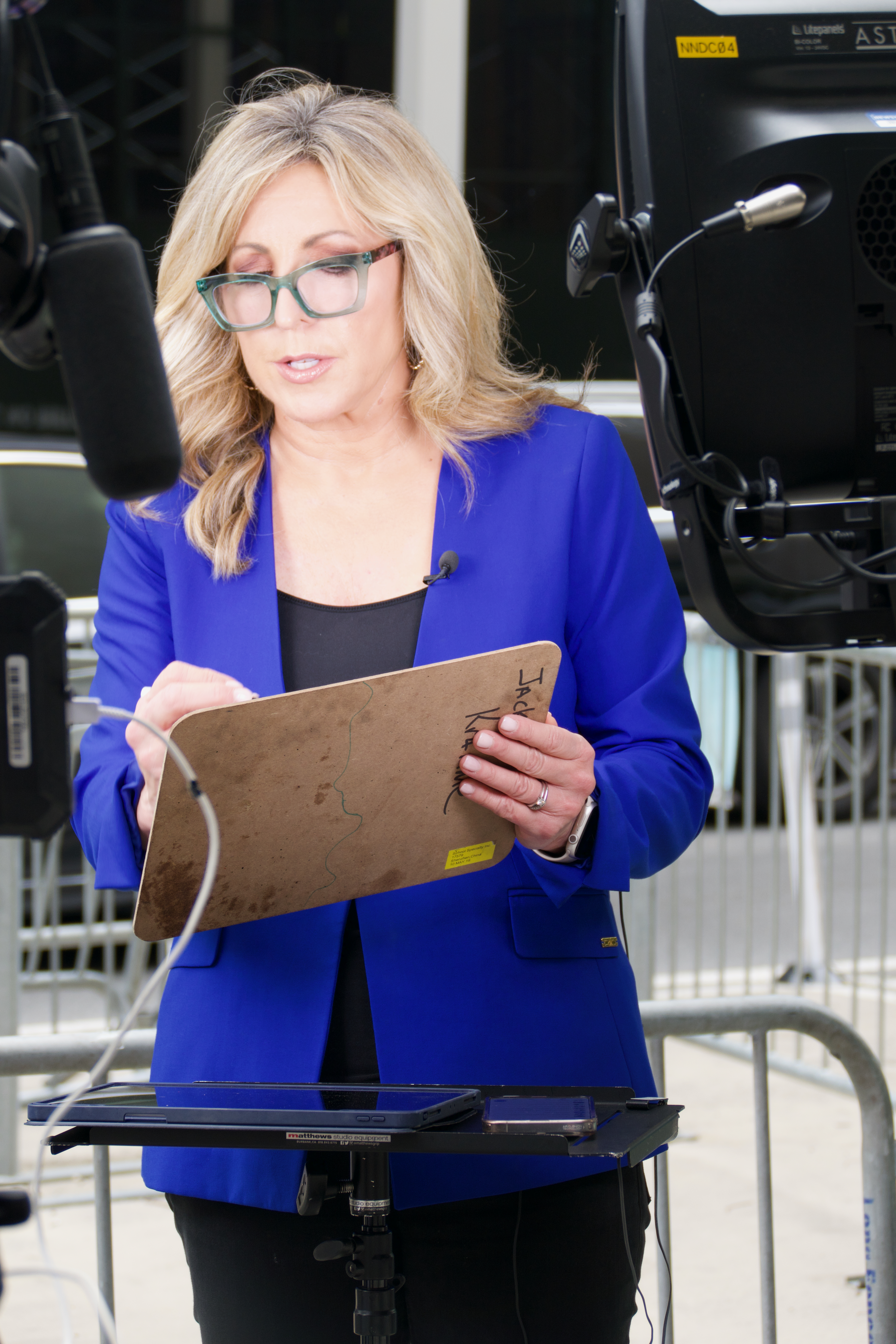
- Occupation: News correspondent
- Spouse: Kenny Kramme
- Children: 1

Laura Ingle is a news correspondent for NewsNation.

== Career ==
Ingle worked as a general assignment reporter where she reported on the Scott Peterson and Michael Jackson trials for talk radio station KFI AM 640 in Los Angeles. She also served as a news anchor and reporter for KFBK in Sacramento. She joined Fox News in 2005 as a Dallas-based correspondent, and is currently based in New York City.

In June 2023, the news website Mediaite stated that Ingle had been laid off from the network. In the fall of 2023, Ingle joined the news channel NewsNation.

== Personal life ==
Ingle is married to Kenny Kramme. In 2013, she gave birth to their son, Jackson Marshall Kramme.

== See also ==
- New Yorkers in journalism
