= 1988 West Virginia Supreme Court of Appeals election =

- November 8, 1988
Nominee	Margaret Workman	Thomas B. Miller
Party	Democratic	Democratic
Popular vote	363,458	346,391
Percentage	33.96%	32.36%
Nominee	Charlotte Lane	Jeniver Jones
Party	Republican	Republican
Popular vote	210,473	149,920
Percentage	19.67%	14.01%
Justices before election
Thomas B. Miller
Democratic
Darrell McGraw
Democratic
Elected Justices
Thomas B. Miller
Democratic
Margaret Workman
Democratic

The 1988 West Virginia Supreme Court of Appeals election took place on November 8, 1988, to elect two Justices of the Supreme Court of Appeals of West Virginia for the next 12 years. The electoral system requires voters to vote for no more than two candidates.

Incumbent Democratic Justices Thomas B. Miller and Darrell McGraw ran for re-election for second 12-year terms on the court. However, McGraw was defeated in the Democratic primary by Margaret Workman, while Miller won re-nomination.

In the general election, Miller and Workman defeated Republican nominees Charlotte Lane and Jeniver J. Jones.

== Democratic primary ==
=== Candidates ===
==== Nominees ====
- Thomas B. Miller, incumbent Justice of the Supreme Court of Appeals.
- Margaret Workman, Kanawha County Circuit Judge.

==== Eliminated in primary ====
- Darrell McGraw, incumbent Justice of the Supreme Court of Appeals.
- John Hey, Kanawha County Circuit Judge.
- Fred L. Fox II, Marion County Circuit Judge.

=== Results ===
May 10, 1988 Democratic primary
Party	Candidate	Votes	%
Democratic	Thomas B. Miller (incumbent)	136,582	24.67%
Democratic	Margaret Workman	119,890	21.66%
Democratic	Darrell McGraw (incumbent)	113,028	20.42%
Democratic	John Hey	92,679	16.74%
Democratic	Fred L. Fox II	91,367	16.51%
Total votes		553,546	100.00%

== Republican primary ==
=== Candidates ===
==== Nominees ====
- Charlotte Lane, former member of the Public Service Commission and former member of the House of Delegates from the 17th district. (1978-1980)
- Jeniver Jones

May 10, 1988 Republican primary
Party	Candidate	Votes	%
Republican	Charlotte Lane	93,418	53.60%
Republican	Jeniver Jones	80,865	46.40%
Total votes		174,283	100.00%

== General election ==
=== Results ===
1988 West Virginia Supreme Court of Appeals election
Party	Candidate	Votes	%
Democratic	Margaret Workman	363,458	33.96%
Democratic	Thomas B. Miller (incumbent)	346,391	32.36%
Republican	Charlotte Lane	210,473	19.67%
Republican	Jeniver Jones	149,920	14.01%
Total votes		1,070,242	100.00%
Democratic hold			
Democratic hold			
