= Moore Capito =

American politician (born 1982)

- Official portrait, 2025

United States Attorney for the Southern District of West Virginia
- Incumbent
- Assumed office October 10, 2025
- President: Donald Trump
- Preceded by: William S. Thompson

Member of the West Virginia House of Delegates
- In office December 1, 2016 – December 22, 2023
- Preceded by: JB McCuskey
- Succeeded by: JB Akers
- Constituency: 35th district (2016–2022); 55th district (2022–2023)

Personal details
- Born: Arch Alfred Moore Capito; August 30, 1982 (age 44) Charleston, West Virginia, U.S.
- Party: Republican
- Spouses: Katie Brings (div. 2021); Liberty Vittert (m. 2024)
- Children: 3
- Relatives: Shelley Moore Capito (mother); Arch Moore (grandfather); Shelley Moore (grandmother); Riley Moore (cousin)
- Education: Duke University (BA); Washington and Lee University (JD)

Arch Alfred Moore Capito (born August 30, 1982) is an American attorney and politician who served in the West Virginia House of Delegates from 2016 to 2023. A member of the Republican Party, he was a candidate for governor of West Virginia in the state's 2024 gubernatorial election but was defeated by Patrick Morrisey. He resigned from the West Virginia House in December 2023 to focus on his campaign. He was confirmed as United States Attorney for the Southern District of West Virginia in 2025.

Capito earned a Bachelor of Arts from Duke University and a Juris Doctor from the Washington and Lee University School of Law.

== Personal life ==
Capito is a Presbyterian. He is married to Liberty Vittert Capito, a commentator, television presenter, and professor of practice of data science at Washington University in St. Louis, with whom he lives in Charleston, West Virginia. Capito and Vittert have a son, born in 2025.

He was previously married to Katie Brings Capito, with whom he had two children. Their divorce was finalized on January 20, 2021.

Moore is the son of U.S. Senator Shelley Moore Capito, the grandson of former West Virginia Governor Arch A. Moore Jr. and Shelley Riley Moore, and the cousin of Riley Moore.

== Electoral history ==
West Virginia House of Delegates District 35, Republican primary results, 2016
Party	Candidate	Votes	%
Republican	Moore Capito	4,896	23.8%
Republican	Eric Nelson (incumbent)	4,388	21.3%
Republican	Charlotte Lane	2,973	14.4%
Republican	Keith Pauley	2,890	14.0%
Republican	Matt Kelly	2,731	13.3%
Republican	Bill Johnson	1,853	9.0%
Republican	Calvin Grimm	866	4.2%
Total votes		20,597	100.0%

West Virginia House of Delegates District 35 General Election, 2016
Party	Candidate	Votes	%
Republican	Moore Capito	14,822	16.7%
Democratic	Andrew Byrd (incumbent)	13,546	15.2%
Republican	Eric Nelson (incumbent)	11,881	13.4%
Republican	Charlotte Lane	10,505	11.8%
Republican	Keith Pauley	10,251	11.5%
Democratic	Ben Adams	9,899	11.1%
Democratic	Thorton Cooper	9,404	10.6%
Democratic	Benjamin M. Sheridan	8,628	9.7%
Total votes		88,936	100.0%

West Virginia House of Delegates District 35, Republican primary results, 2018
Party	Candidate	Votes	%
Republican	Moore Capito (incumbent)	3,952	27.5%
Republican	Eric Nelson (incumbent)	3,469	24.1%
Republican	Charlotte Lane (incumbent)	2,902	20.2%
Republican	Edward Burgess	2,186	15.2%
Republican	Bill Johnson	1,879	13.0%
Total votes		14,388	100.0%

West Virginia House of Delegates District 35 General Election, 2018
Party	Candidate	Votes	%
Democratic	Douglas Skaff Jr.	13,202	14.9%
Democratic	Andrew Byrd (incumbent)	13,038	14.8%
Republican	Moore Capito (incumbent)	12,729	14.4%
Republican	Eric Nelson (incumbent)	11,765	13.3%
Republican	Charlotte Lane (incumbent)	10,309	11.7%
Democratic	Renate Pore	10,165	11.5%
Democratic	James Robinette	9,444	10.7%
Republican	Edward Burgess	7,767	8.8%
Total votes		88,419	100.0%

West Virginia House of Delegates District 35, Republican primary results, 2020
Party	Candidate	Votes	%
Republican	Moore Capito (incumbent)	5,819	30.3%
Republican	Chris Stansbury	3,888	20.2%
Republican	Larry Pack	3,576	18.6%
Republican	Trevor Morris	3,118	16.2%
Republican	Brady Campbell	2,809	14.6%
Total votes		19,210	100.0%

West Virginia House of Delegates District 35 General Election, 2020
Party	Candidate	Votes	%
Republican	Moore Capito (incumbent)	16,021	15.7%
Democratic	Douglas Skaff Jr. (incumbent)	15,975	15.6%
Republican	Larry Pack	12,431	12.2%
Democratic	Kayla Young	12,323	12.1%
Democratic	Kathy Ferguson	12,076	11.8%
Democratic	Rusty Williams	12,035	11.8%
Republican	Chris Stansbury	11,059	10.8%
Republican	Trevor Morris	10,304	10.1%
Total votes		102,224	100.0%

West Virginia House of Delegates District 55, Republican primary results, 2022
Party	Candidate	Votes	%
Republican	Moore Capito (incumbent)	1,065	100.0%
Total votes		1,065	100.0%

West Virginia House of Delegates District 35 General Election, 2022
Party	Candidate	Votes	%
Republican	Moore Capito (incumbent)	3,476	59.2%
Democratic	Greg Childress	2,393	40.8%
Total votes		5,869	100.0%
Republican hold			

West Virginia Republican Gubernatorial primary results, 2024
Party	Candidate	Votes	%
Republican	Patrick Morrisey	74,774	33.3%
Republican	Moore Capito	61,920	27.6%
Republican	Chris Miller	45,791	20.4%
Republican	Mac Warner	36,037	16.0%
Republican	Mitch Roberts	3,113	1.4%
Republican	Kevin Christian	3,056	1.4%
Total votes		221,185	100.00%
