= Ditter =

Ditter is a surname. Notable people with the surname include:

- Christian Ditter (born 1977), German film director, producer and screenwriter
- J. William Ditter (1888–1943), American politician
- John William Ditter Jr. (1921–2019), American judge
- Robert Ditter (1924−2007), German educator
