= WGN Studios =

Television studio and corporate office located in Chicago, Illinois

- Former names: WGN Mid-America Broadcast Center; WGN Continental Broadcast Center

General information
- Type: Film, radio, and television production studio Corporate offices
- Location: 2501 W Bradley Place; Chicago, Illinois; 60618
- Coordinates: 41.948739°N 87.692103°W
- Opening: June 1961
- Owner: Hines Global Income Trust, Inc.

The WGN Studios, formerly known as the WGN Mid-America Broadcast Center and the WGN Continental Broadcast Center is a television production studio located in Chicago, Illinois. The studio houses broadcasting facilities for WGN-TV, Rewind TV, and NewsNation and had previously housed production and broadcasting facilities for WGN America, Chicagoland Television, and WGN Radio.

== History ==
=== Early history ===
From 1950 to 1961, WGN Radio and WGN-TV's production and broadcasting facilities were located at the Tribune Tower in downtown Chicago which had been the headquarters of the Chicago Tribune newspaper. In June 1961, WGN Radio and WGN-TV's broadcasting and production operations had relocated to a purpose-built two-story radio and television production and broadcasting studio located in the North Center community.

From 1960 to 2001, the studios hosted tapings for the children's television program Bozo's Circus which featured Bozo the Clown, initially portrayed by Bob Bell, as its host.

=== 1970s–2000s ===
In 1978, the Federal Communications Commission (FCC) granted Tulsa, Oklahoma-based Southern Satellite Systems and United Video Inc. (later United Video Satellite Group), Lansing, Michigan-based American Microwave & Communications, and Milwaukee-based Midwestern Relay Company the authority to uplink WGN-TV's signal to various cable and satellite television providers throughout the United States. On October 30, 1978, Southern Satellite Systems owner Edward L. Taylor had announced that Transponder 13 of the Satcom 1 satellite in which the company had assigned WGN-TV's transmission signal to, had failed after RCA American Communications had refused a request to assign the station a new transponder unless Satellite Communications Systems (a joint venture between SSS and Holiday Inn) agreed to dismiss a lawsuit it filed against RCA on October 16 over retaining the use of Satcom Transponder 18 after January 1, 1979. On December 6, 1978, United Video Inc. uplinked WGN-TV's signal through a satellite relay facility in Monee, Illinois to the Satcom-3 communications satellite for redistribution to cable systems and C-band satellite providers throughout the United States, effectively making the station the second superstation to have its signal transmitted nationally and eventually internationally through Canada under the branding of the WGN Superstation and eventually WGN America.

In 1986, WGN relocated its radio broadcasting facilities back to the Tribune Tower with the station's television operations being retained at the Continental Broadcast Center.

On August 28, 2009, the Tribune Company relocated Chicagoland Television (CLTV)'s broadcasting and production operations to the WGN Studios and had transferred editorial control of the network's news operations to WGN-TV's news department.

=== 2010s–present ===
On January 31, 2017, Tribune sold the complex to R2 Companies, a local real estate developer for $22.2 with WGN's operations remaining at the studio.

Prior to the closure of WGN America, and the launch of NewsNation on March 1, 2021, the WGN Studios had undergone a $3.5 million 13,000-square-foot expansion to accommodate NewsNation's operations including remodeling a studio which housed WGN-TV's local newscasts. On November 22, 2021, the WGN Studios were bought by Hines Global Income Trust for $30.5 million.
