= List of Rewind TV affiliates =

The following is a listing of affiliates for Rewind TV, a digital subchannel network owned by Nexstar Media Group.

== Affiliates ==
List of Rewind TV affiliates
Media market	State	Station	Channel
Florence–Huntsville–Decatur	Alabama	WHDF	15.3
Phoenix	Arizona	KAZT-CD	7.5
Prescott	Arizona	KAZT-TV	7.5
Fayetteville	Arkansas	KXNW	34.2
Pine Bluff–Little Rock	Arkansas	KASN	38.2
Chico–Redding	California	KUCO-LD	27.4
Fresno	California	KSEE	24.4
Los Angeles	California	KTLA	5.5
San Diego	California	KUSI-TV	51.2
San Francisco–Oakland–San Jose	California	KRON-TV	4.3
Colorado Springs	Colorado	KXTU-LD	57.2
Hartford–New Haven	Connecticut	WTNH	8.2
Pensacola	Florida	WJTC	44.2
West Palm Beach	Florida	WWHB-CD	48.4
Savannah	Georgia	WTGS	28.7
Honolulu	Hawaii	KHII-TV	9.2
Twin Falls	Idaho	KBAX-LD	27.7
Champaign	Illinois	WBUI	23.4
Chicago	Illinois	WGN-TV	9.4
Bloomington–Indianapolis	Indiana	WTTV	4.5
South Bend	Indiana	WSJV	28.7
Terre Haute	Indiana	WAWV-TV	38.4
Ames–Des Moines	Iowa	WOI-DT	5.6
Burlington–Davenport–Bettendorf	Iowa	KGCW	26.2
Danville–Lexington	Kentucky	WDKY-TV	56.2
New Orleans	Louisiana	WGNO	26.3
Shreveport	Louisiana	KMSS-TV	33.2
Hagerstown	Maryland	WDVM-TV	25.3
Minneapolis–Saint Paul	Minnesota	WUCW	23.5
Kansas City	Missouri	WDAF-TV	4.3
Las Vegas	Nevada	KLAS-TV	8.3
Reno	Nevada	KRNV-DT	4.4
Albuquerque–Santa Fe	New Mexico	KWBQ	19.5
Albany–Schenectady–Troy	New York	WXXA-TV	23.4
Buffalo	New York	WNLO	23.2
New York City	New York	WPIX	11.4
Belmont–Charlotte	North Carolina	WJZY	46.8
Greensboro–Winston-Salem–High Point	North Carolina	WMYV	48.2
Greenville–Washington–New Bern–Jacksonville	North Carolina	WNCT-TV	9.3
Raleigh–Durham–Fayetteville–Goldsboro	North Carolina	WNCN	17.2
Akron–Cleveland	Ohio	WBNX-TV	55.3
Oklahoma City	Oklahoma	KAUT-TV	43.2
Tulsa	Oklahoma	KTUL	8.4
Portland–Salem	Oregon	KOIN	6.3
Pittsburgh	Pennsylvania	WPTG-CD	69.8
Scranton–Wilkes-Barre	Pennsylvania	WBRE-TV	28.3
Providence	Rhode Island	WNAC-TV	64.3
Greenville–Spartanburg–Anderson	South Carolina	WYCW	62.3
Bristol–Johnson City–Kingsport	Tennessee	WEMT	39.6
Knoxville	Tennessee	WATE-TV	6.3
Memphis	Tennessee	WLMT	30.8
Amarillo	Texas	KCPN-LD	33.2
Austin	Texas	KXAN-TV	36.4
Dallas–Fort Worth	Texas	KDAF	33.5
Houston	Texas	KIAH	39.5
Lubbock	Texas	KLBK-TV	13.4
Odessa–Midland	Texas	KPEJ-TV	24.3
San Antonio	Texas	KABB	29.3
Tyler–Longview	Texas	KIVY-LD	16.3
Salt Lake City	Utah	KTVX	4.3
Charleston–Huntington	West Virginia	WOWK-TV	13.4
