= Rewind TV =

American television network

- Type: Digital broadcast network; (Classic TV)
- Country: United States
- Broadcast area: Nationwide via OTA digital TV stations, and cable TV (60%)
- Affiliates: List of affiliates
- Headquarters: WGN Studios, 2501 W Bradley Place, Chicago, Illinois

Programming
- Language: English
- Picture format: 720p (HDTV); 480i (SDTV)

Ownership
- Owner: Nexstar Media Group
- Key people: Sean Compton (Network President)
- Sister channels: Antenna TV; NewsNation; The CW; True Crime Network; Quest

History
- Founded: April 26, 2021; 5 years ago
- Launched: September 1, 2021; 5 years ago

Links
- Website: Official website

Rewind TV is an American digital television network owned by Nexstar Media Group, and is a spinoff/sister network of Antenna TV. The network's programming consists of classic television series, primarily sitcoms, from the 1980s to the early 2000s. Rewind TV's programming and advertising operations are headquartered in the WGN-TV studios in Chicago.

== History ==
=== Origins and launch ===
In July 2016, Antenna TV owner Tribune Broadcasting was considering adding a sister network which would take shows that draw older audiences, in an arrangement that proposed refocusing Antenna TV around shows targeting younger audiences. By April 26, 2021, this idea had evolved and Nexstar Media - which had bought out Tribune - announced that it would launch a new digital broadcast network - Rewind TV - focusing on sitcoms from the 1980s, 1990s and 2000s, serving as a complementary sister network to Antenna TV (which now focuses on shows from the 1950s, 1960s, and 1970s).

Rewind TV began operations at 5 a.m. on September 1, 2021, making the network available to 50 million households in the United States.

The network is available in many media markets via the digital subchannels of over-the-air television stations, and on select cable television providers, such as Xfinity and Cox through a local affiliate of the network and IPTV. However, as of 2025, it is not available on any streaming service with the network's owner, Nexstar not interested in this platform.

== Programming ==
Rewind TV's program schedule relies on the extensive library of television programming currently owned by Sony Pictures. Like sister network Antenna TV, the network maintains an Eastern Time Zone schedule, with individual programs airing at the same time in the remainder of the country, though by effect, aired locally in earlier time slots from the Central Time Zone westward. Unlike Antenna TV that never had a screenbug until April 2026, Rewind TV maintained a screenbug since the channel's launch.

The network's primary continuity announcer is Rick Dees.

=== Classic television series ===
Rewind TV has program licensing agreements with Sony Pictures Entertainment (which includes series produced by Columbia Pictures Television, TriStar Television and their merged production unit Columbia TriStar Television (which was reorganized as Sony Pictures Television in 2002), Screen Gems, and ELP Communications (including predecessors Tandem Productions, ELP Communications) and CBS Media Ventures.

The network's series programming primarily covers sitcoms from the 1980s to the early 2000s and (as of January 2026) includes shows such as The Drew Carey Show; Becker; Wings; Designing Women; Family Ties; Who's the Boss?; Sabrina the Teenage Witch; Benson; Head of the Class; Just Shoot Me!; NewsRadio; 227; Mad About You; Murphy Brown; The Hogan Family, Rules of Engagement; The John Larroquette Show; Dear John; Caroline in the City; Suddenly Susan; Mork & Mindy; My Two Dads and Archie Bunker's Place.
