= Liberty Vittert =

American statistician, political commentator, and TV show host

- Vittert in 2018
- Education: Massachusetts Institute of Technology (BS); University of Glasgow (PhD)
- Spouse: Moore Capito (m. 2024)
- Children: 1
- Scientific career
- Workplaces: Washington University in St. Louis
- Thesis: Facial Shape Analysis (2015)

Liberty Vittert Capito is an American statistician, political commentator, and host of Liberty's Great American Cookbook, a cooking show on Scottish Television.

Vittert is a Professor of Practice of Data Science at the Olin Business School at Washington University in St. Louis. She is also the feature editor of the Harvard Data Science Review. She is the host of MIT's Data Science Podcast, "Data Nation" hosted by the MIT Institute for Data Systems and Society. Vittert is a Senior Data Scientist at Decision Desk HQ and their public facing representative for election calls and analysis. She was a Senior Fellow at the Harvard under the Harvard Data Science Initiative, is a research scholar at MIT and a visiting scholar and Columbia University in New York City. Previously, Vittert served as the Mitchell Lecturer at the University of Glasgow’s School of Mathematics and Statistics. She is also a Faculty Scholar at the Institute for Public Health and she was a visiting scholar at Columbia University. and Harvard University where she is a Senior Fellow. In 2022, Vittert was named one of the Top 50 Undergraduate Professors in the United States by Poets and Quants.

== Education ==
Vittert earned her B.S. in mathematics with a concentration in political science from the Massachusetts Institute of Technology. She received her Ph.D. from the University of Glasgow's School of Mathematics and Statistics. Her thesis advisor was Adrian Bowman. Additionally, she received a Diplome de Patisserie et Cuisine de Base from Le Cordon Bleu in Paris.

== Career ==
In 2015 Vittert was named a Mitchell Lecturer (Associate Professor) at the university, specializing in facial recognition and probability. Vittert and team have been credited with working on a project to revolutionize the care of children with facial deformities in developing countries.

A frequent contributor on cable news networks, Vittert is an expert on data, disinformation, election polling, and the refugee crisis. Vittert is the resident weekly "On-Air" statistician for her brother Leland Vittert's program News Nation "On Balance" and a regular op-ed contributor to The Hill. She has appeared on Fox News Channel, PBS, BBC, and other news channels to discuss political issues. Her opinion editorials regularly appear on Fox News and have been featured in U.S. News & World Report, CBS News, Newsweek, The Conversation and as a general contributor to Business Insider. Vittert has a regular column on Fox Business called "A Statistician's Guide to Life."

In 2015, Vittert joined the board of USA for the United Nations High Commissioner for Refugees (UNHCR). Vittert also serves on the board of UNHCR’s Project Hive. In 2020, Vittert was appointed to the International Advisory Council of the United Nations Migration Agency (USA for IOM). Vittert is also on the Investment Committee of Sibley Hospital in Washington D.C. and on the Data and Technology working group for MD Anderson for the Lancet.

Her cooking show, Liberty’s Great American Cookbook, utilizes cooking from Le Cordon Bleu Paris and has aired nationwide in Scotland on STV since 2016.

As a feature editor of the Harvard Data Science Review, Vittert is the co-host of the Harvard Data Science Review Podcast.

Vittert is an Ambassador for the Royal Statistical Society, a named BBC Expert Woman in Mathematics, and an elected member of the International Statistical Institute (ISI). Given these positions, she is regularly asked to testify as an expert witness in a multitude of cases. For example, in Spring of 2024, Vittert testified in front of the United States Senate Health, Education, Labor and Pensions Committee on the possibility of introducing a 32 hour work week into law in the United States.

In 2026, she was appointed to the UAP Science Advisory Council, established by the White House, Pentagon, FBI and intelligence agencies, and led by Avi Loeb.

== Personal life ==
Vittert was raised in St. Louis, Missouri. She was named one of the "Coolest People in Scotland" in 2018 by The Herald. Her brother, Leland Vittert, is an Emmy-nominated anchor on NewsNation. Liberty is married to Moore Capito, an American politician and son of Shelley Moore Capito. In 2025, they had a son.
