= Gymnasium Schramberg =

Coordinates: 48°13′17″N 8°23′11″E

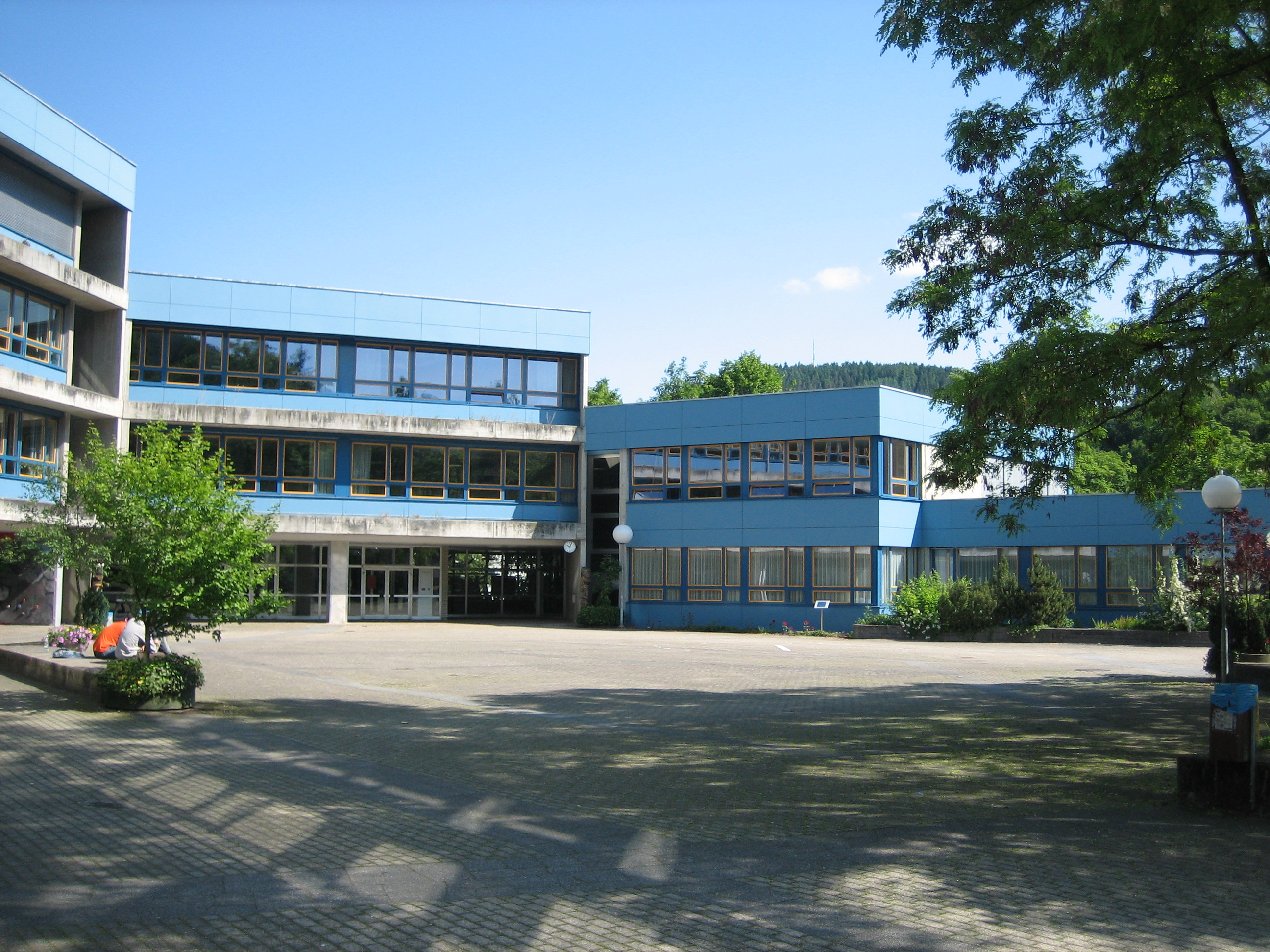
- Berneckstraße 32 Schramberg; Germany

Information
- Type: Gymnasium
- Established: 1840; 186 years ago
- School district: Rottweil
- Principal: Oliver Porsch
- Faculty: 64
- Grades: 5-13
- Enrollment: 900
- Athletics: Football, handball, track and field
- Website: http://www.gymnasium-schramberg.de

Gymnasium Schramberg is a German gymnasium (secondary school) in Schramberg in the Black Forest founded in 1840. Currently it has ca. 900 pupils and 65 teachers.

== The building ==
The building from 1972/73 consists of five concrete blocks arranged in semicircular form. From right to left each block is one floor higher than the preceding one. On the left of the highest block there is a gymnasium (sports hall). Behind the entrance hall in block 3 there is an auditorium (Aula), which is used for school events as well as for minor cultural or political events for the general public. In 2007 a cafeteria (Mensa) was added in front of the highest block, where up to 300 students can have meals.

== History ==
The school's history goes back to 1840 when a one-class Realschule was founded, privileged by the King of Württemberg. It was located in the same building as the then elementary school until 1876 in which year it was moved to a building nearby. In 1888 a second class was added and by 1905 the school had five teachers who taught six classes in a combined Realschule and a formerly private Lateinschule. In the same year the first girls were admitted. In 1906 the school moved to a building of its own, the very same building which houses today's Schramberg Realschule.

In 1937 the Nazi administration named the school Oberschule für Jungen (secondary school for boys). in 1940 the first students took their Abitur exams. After World War II Schramberg was occupied by French troops and teaching activities were suspended until October 1945. In 1953 the school was given its present name Gymnasium Schramberg. Increasing numbers of students made it necessary to build annexes and even find rooms in other municipal buildings. In 1968 the Schramberg Council decided to build a new Gymnasium which was erected at the present site off Berneckstraße and was dedicated in 1973. Even the new building became too small when in 1980 the number of students reached 1,407, and again rooms in the nearby elementary school had to be occupied by Gymnasium girls and boys. In 1990 the school celebrated the 150th anniversary of its foundation and the 50th anniversary of Abitur exams.

== School twinning ==
The school has regular exchange programmes with several foreign schools. Due to the town twinning agreement between Schramberg and Hirson, France, the Collège Georges Cobast in Hirson is one of them. Other French partner schools are Sainte-Thérèse at Quimper, Brittany and the Collège St. Joseph at Voiron, Isère. Contacts to Romania have led to exchange programmes with a school in Sibiu. In recent years contacts with schools in Poland have been started.

== Some prominent persons linked to Gymnasium Schramberg ==
=== Prominent teachers ===
- Robert Ditter
- Bernd Richter

=== Prominent alumni ===
- Kerstin Andreae
- Martin Weppler
- Franz Baumann
- Martin Grüner
- Christophe Neff
