= Antenna TV =

American television network

- Type: Digital broadcast network; (Classic TV)
- Country: United States
- Broadcast area: Nationwide via OTA digital and cable TV; (Covering 88.9% of the U.S.)
- Affiliates: List of affiliates
- Headquarters: Chicago, Illinois

Programming
- Language: English
- Picture format: 720p (HDTV); 480i (SDTV)

Ownership
- Owner: Nexstar Media Group
- Key people: Sean Compton (Network President)
- Sister channels: The CW; NewsNation; Rewind TV; True Crime Network; Quest

History
- Founded: August 30, 2010; 15 years ago
- Launched: January 1, 2011; 15 years ago

Links
- Website: antennatv.tv

Availability

Streaming media
- Service(s): Hulu + Live TV

Antenna TV is an American digital television network owned by Nexstar Media Group. The network's programming consists of classic television series, primarily sitcoms, from the 1960s to the early 2000s. Antenna TV's programming and advertising operations are headquartered in the WGN-TV studios in Chicago. The network's operations are overseen by Sean Compton, who serves as the president of networks for Nexstar.

The network is available in many media markets via the digital subchannels of over-the-air television stations, and on select cable television providers through a local affiliate of the network and IPTV. In July 2026, the network was added to Hulu + Live TV, marking the first time the network was added to a national streaming provider after initially rejecting the platform.

Antenna TV broadcasts 24 hours a day in either 480i standard definition or 720p high definition depending on market.

== History ==
Original logo, used from January 1 to August 29, 2011

Tribune Broadcasting announced the formation of Antenna TV on August 30, 2010, with television stations owned by Tribune and Local TV LLC (an Oak Hill Capital Partners-controlled holding company that Tribune had been co-managing since 2008, in an agreement that remained in place until Tribune completed its outright acquisition of the group in December 2013) serving as its initial charter affiliates; Tribune originally intended to launch the network on January 3, 2011, but executives later chose to push the date of its debut two days ahead of schedule.

Antenna TV was launched on January 1, 2011, at 12:00 a.m. Eastern Time Zone (the late evening of December 31, 2010, in other U.S. time zones), initially debuting on seventeen Tribune-owned stations and thirteen stations owned by Local TV. The first program to air on Antenna TV was The Three Stooges' first short Woman Haters as part of a marathon of short films involving the comedy trio (which became an annual New Year's Day tradition on the network that aired until 2015, originally airing as an all-day marathon before being reduced to airing only on New Year's Day morning in 2013).

On October 1, 2011, Antenna TV introduced block programming scheduling for most of its programs, organized by genre and the decade of their original broadcast; it included a weekday afternoon block of sitcoms from the 1950s, a weekend afternoon block of 1960s sitcoms (including the early 1970s sitcom, The Partridge Family), a Saturday night lineup of drama series (a genre of television programs which had previously aired on the network in very limited form on Sunday mornings only), an overnight block of classic television series from the monochrome era of the 1950s and early 1960s, a Sunday prime time lineup of sitcoms from the 1990s, and a weeknight prime time lineup of comedies from the 1970s; with the exception of the black-and-white program block (which was reduced to once a week and moved to Friday nights, where it remained – except for a brief sabbatical from January to April 2013 – until being dropped completely in November of that same year) and the Saturday night drama block (which was reduced to Saturday evenings only, and was later replaced by movies in September 2013), most of these blocks were dropped on March 26, 2012.

Logo from 2011 to 2022

== Programming ==
Antenna TV's program schedule relies on the extensive library of films and television programming currently owned by Sony Pictures, which comprises more than 270 television series and over 4,000 films. The network maintains an Eastern Time Zone schedule, with individual programs airing at the same time in the remainder of the country, though by effect, aired locally in earlier time slots from the Central Time Zone westward. As is common with digital multicast networks, advertisements featured during commercial breaks on Antenna TV primarily consist of direct marketing for products featured in infomercials and particularly during its Saturday morning children's programming, public service announcements; satellite provider Dish Network and insurance company Progressive Corporation are currently the network's primary national sponsors. Many Antenna TV affiliates also use the allotted advertising time to feature localized promotions, ranging from upcoming programming seen on that affiliate's other digital channels, to newspaper and vehicle dealership advertisements, to community service announcements.

The network did not display a digital on-screen graphic during its programs until April 2026, but formerly allowed affiliates to incorporate their own bug during Antenna TV programming; many stations that follow this practice utilize modified versions of logos that the affiliate station has used as part of their main branding in the past (for example, WPHL-TV in Philadelphia uses a variant of the logo it used from 1976 to 1987, under the brand "Channel 17, The Great Entertainer").

The network's original continuity announcer was Gary Owens, who served in that capacity until his death on February 12, 2015, although promos that he voiced beforehand continued to air until that September. John B. Wells also provided promotional continuity from November 2011 to July 2015. Shadoe Stevens became the network's main announcer in July 2015.

Antenna TV also runs occasional marathons of series to which it holds rights through its content agreements on major occasions. Prior to "Antenna TV Theater"'s discontinuation, the network also aired movie marathons on Valentine's Day, Memorial Day, Veterans Day (until 2013) and Super Bowl Sunday (until 2015) and racing day in 2016. Among the marathons regularly carried by the network are those of Hazel and Father Knows Best that have respectively aired on Mother's Day and Father's Day annually since 2011 (in the former case, the exceptions were in 2015, 2016, 2023, 2024, 2025 and 2026, when it aired marathons of One Day at a Time, Family Ties, The Partridge Family, Sanford and Son and Too Close for Comfort on those holidays); it also airs a 48-hour marathon of holiday-themed episodes of its various series from Christmas Eve until Christmas night, which is interrupted for five hours on Christmas morning by its broadcast of the Yule Log (a filmed loop of logs burning inside a fireplace at Gracie Mansion set to a soundtrack of Christmas music, which first aired on co-owned New York City affiliate WPIX in December 1966). Since the network began carrying most of the surviving episodes of the Johnny Carson run of The Tonight Show to its schedule in January 2016, many of these marathons have been followed by Tonight Show episodes featuring guests who starred in the featured marathon program. The acquisition also resulted in the network running fewer marathons that run into the late prime time and overnight hours (among the few exceptions was 2017's "All of All in the Family Marathon," a five-day-long, Thanksgiving weekend stunt of all 205 All in the Family episodes [commemorating the show's then-pending departure from Antenna TV], which included Carson episodes featuring stars of the former as guests that aired in Carson's network-designated timeslots between the nighttime blocks of AITF episodes).

The network also marks the occurrence of an actor's recent death (either an established or character actor) with an "in memoriam" bumper shown during breaks between certain programs, and an occasional afternoon-long marathon showcasing episodes of that artist's television series roles – either guest appearances, episodes of series in which the person was a regular cast member, or both.

=== Classic television series ===
Antenna TV has program licensing agreements with Sony Pictures Entertainment (which includes series produced by Columbia Pictures Television, TriStar Television and their merged production unit Columbia TriStar Television (which was reorganized as Sony Pictures Television in 2002), Screen Gems, and ELP Communications (including predecessors Tandem Productions, ELP Communications), CBS Media Ventures, and DLT Entertainment. The network also shares broadcast rights to classic television programs from the NBCUniversal Syndication Studios and Disney Media Distribution's 20th Television libraries with competing Weigel Broadcasting-owned digital broadcast network and primary rightsholder MeTV (with Antenna TV gaining access to Universal's program library in the fall of 2011, after those shows were removed from the Retro Television Network, and access to 20th Television's library via its April 2012 acquisition of WKRP in Cincinnati with other series from the library being added in January 2015) and rights to select program titles from Warner Bros. Television Distribution, and MGM Television (which includes series produced by Filmways and United Artists Television, but does not include content owned by its Metro-Goldwyn-Mayer prior to the 1986 acquisition of films and television programs produced directly by MGM by Ted Turner) with Antenna TV sister network This TV.

The network's series programming primarily covers sitcoms from the 1960s to the early 2000s and (as of January 2026) includes shows such as The Drew Carey Show; Becker; Wings; Designing Women; Family Ties; Who's the Boss?; Sabrina the Teenage Witch; Sanford and Son; One Day at a Time; Three's Company; I Dream of Jeannie; Bewitched; Mad About You; Head of the Class; The Partridge Family, The Jeffersons; Barney Miller; Alice; Benson; The Facts of Life; 227; Too Close for Comfort; NewsRadio and Just Shoot Me!. While several series on the network have been widely syndicated on other television outlets in the United States and abroad, some series featured on the network (such as Hazel, McHale's Navy, My Favorite Martian, Evening Shade, Dear John, Soap, Doogie Howser, M.D., Bachelor Father, My Two Dads and Small Wonder) have not been seen on television – at least, in the U.S. – for several years or have been syndicated on a fairly inconsistent basis, and a few (such as My Mother the Car, It's About Time, Good Morning World, The Paul Lynde Show and Lotsa Luck) were too short-lived to have ever had a syndication afterlife.

Drama series, which occupied a limited amount of the network's schedule for the first few months on the air, later expanded with an October 2011 programming realignment, with crime drama, mystery and suspense programs airing in an evening block on Saturdays, which included It Takes a Thief, Adam-12, Alfred Hitchcock Presents, S.W.A.T. and Suspense Theatre/Crisis; some of these programs are also aired during the week in limited form during the late afternoon and overnight hours. The Saturday drama block was discontinued in September 2012, with drama series on Saturdays being moved to the late afternoon hours and movies replacing them in prime time on that night. Drama series are now only seen on Saturday mornings as of January 2017 and were later discontinued altogether, becoming a comedy-only network.

In a rarity for television, Antenna TV has rotated a television series and its spinoffs on its schedule in the same hour, airing the shorter-lived spinoffs of Three's Company (The Ropers and Three's a Crowd) with the parent show being relegated to the first half-hour of the hour-long block (differing from the network's normal double-episode scheduling for its series) once they cycle back onto the schedule (the cycling of The Ropers and Three's a Crowd ended with a January 2015 programming realignment that saw both series given their own separate weekend-only runs on the network). This discontinued when the Three's Company spinoffs were replaced with Saturday Summerthons. After losing the rights to All in the Family in 2018, Antenna TV acquired rights to the sequel series Archie Bunker's Place.

On August 12, 2015, Tribune Broadcasting announced that it had acquired the rights to all surviving episodes of The Tonight Show Starring Johnny Carson through a multi-year agreement with Carson Entertainment, marking the first time that full episodes from that era of The Tonight Show would be shown on television (outside of excerpts aired as part of the clip series Carson's Comedy Classics) since his retirement in May 1992. The broadcasts, which began airing on January 1, 2016, consist of episodes that originally aired from 1972 to 1992; episodes produced after September 1980 that ran 60 minutes in length (per a clause in Carson's renegotiated contract with NBC that reduced the running time of Tonight by a half-hour) air weeknights, while 90-minute episodes produced before September 1980 air on weekends. The broadcasts air under the name Johnny Carson, with references to The Tonight Show and NBC censored to avoid trademark infringement against or confusion with the current run of Tonight under Jimmy Fallon.

On September 1, 2021, Antenna TV would slide most of its library of shows from the 1980s, 1990s, and early 2000s (with the exception of Carson) over to its new spinoff/sister network Rewind TV, while (primarily) focusing itself on shows from the 1950s, 1960s, and 1970s, while still airing a few shows from those decades.

=== Movies ===
From the network's launch in January 2011 until May 2016, Antenna TV aired feature films under the umbrella title Antenna TV Theater. In addition to access to television series owned by Sony Pictures Television, the agreement with Sony Pictures Entertainment also included access to movies from the Sony Pictures Entertainment Motion Picture Group film library (including Columbia Pictures, TriStar Pictures, Sony Pictures Classics, Screen Gems, Triumph Films, and the television rights to the Embassy Pictures library). The film roster did not concentrate on films from any specific era, meaning any film from the 1930s to as late as the early 2000s could be featured on the network's schedule, although from 2014 to 2015, the vast majority of the films that aired on the network were pre-1980s releases.

During 2014, the network shared film content with sister network This TV (a movie-oriented broadcast network, whose transfer of operational control and partial ownership to Tribune from Weigel Broadcasting in November 2013 has partly influenced Antenna TV's removal of films); on certain occasions, a movie that aired on Antenna TV's film block would air on This TV on the same day or during the same week in different timeslots.

Starting in April 2013, Antenna TV gradually scaled back its film telecasts in favor of additional blocks of classic television series (particularly on weekday mornings, where Antenna TV Theater originally ran as a six-hour block from approximately 5:00 a.m. to 1:00 p.m. Eastern Time at the network's launch). Movies were eliminated from weekdays entirely as part of a schedule revamp in January 2015; the Antenna TV Theater block – which by that point, had been relegated to Saturday and Sunday mornings – ended on December 27, 2015, preceding a similar revamp that occurred six days later on January 1, 2016. Movies returned to the lineup in May 2016 as part of a marathon on racing films.

== Affiliates ==
As of February 2016, Antenna TV has current or pending affiliation agreements with television stations in 133 media markets (including 48 of the 50 largest markets) encompassing 43 states and the Washington, D.C., covering 88% of the United States. The network is offered to prospective affiliates on a barter basis, an agreement in which the station will receive the programming at little or no cost in exchange for giving a certain amount of commercial time to the network. Despite this arrangement, some larger television markets without stations owned by Tribune did not affiliate with the network until 2015.

Tribune Broadcasting planned to launch Antenna TV in all markets with stations owned by Tribune and, as part of a co-management agreement between the two groups that existed at the time of the network's launch, Local TV. Tribune's flagship WGN-TV in Chicago serves as the flagship station of the network. In Denver and St. Louis, two of the markets where Tribune maintains duopoly, the Antenna TV affiliation went to digital subchannels of Local TV-owned Fox affiliates KDVR and KTVI, rather than on Tribune-owned The CW affiliates KWGN-TV and KPLR-TV – which were operated alongside KDVR and KTVI under local marketing agreements – in order to address bandwidth concerns as the two Tribune outlets already maintained subchannels carrying This TV (ABC, Fox, and MyNetworkTV stations transmit their main signals by default in 720p, which provides a lower bit rate adequate for multiplexing of up to three subchannels, while the main channels of CBS, NBC and CW stations are usually transmitted in the higher resolution 1080i format, which before advances in multiplexer technology, utilized a larger bit rate size that was more susceptible to causing pixelation of multiple subchannels).

However, not all of the charter affiliates added Antenna TV at its launch either to allow stations to reconfigure their bandwidth or to assure the affiliated subchannel's carriage on cable providers when the network launched locally. Fox affiliate KSTU in Salt Lake City, NBC affiliate WHO-DT in Des Moines, Iowa (both owned by Local TV at the time) and CW affiliate WDCW in Washington, D.C. (owned by Tribune) debuted the network on their digital subchannels later during January 2011; while NBC affiliate KFOR-TV in Oklahoma City did not add the network until April 21, 2011, on a new third digital subchannel (it has since been moved to that station's second subchannel). The final Tribune/Local TV market to add the network was Fort Smith, Arkansas, where Fayetteville, Arkansas-based MyNetworkTV affiliate KXNW began carrying the network on January 5, 2012, as an overnight secondary service; Antenna TV was unable to launch in the market prior to the KXNW purchase due to existing syndicated programming rights held by CBS-affiliated sister KFSM-TV for its MyNetworkTV-affiliated subchannel (which now acts as a KXNW simulcast) and the station's main signal being transmitted in 1080i, which precluded a launch of a third subchannel without affecting picture quality. Some affiliates (such as KTLA in Los Angeles) aired preview blocks of Antenna TV programming on their primary channel in the lead-up to the launch date. In the wake of Universal Sports converting from a digital broadcast to a cable and satellite service on January 1, 2012, most stations affiliated with that network signed affiliation agreements with Antenna TV (or MeTV) to serve as a replacement.

To date, Antenna TV has had three instances of switching affiliates in the same market. In Honolulu, Hawaii, the network moved from charter affiliate KUPU (one of only two stations that carried the network on its primary channel, the other being KXNW, which is the only affiliate that continues to do so) to the secondary subchannel of NBC affiliate KHNL in May 2012, as KUPU was not available on cable television in areas of the state outside the Honolulu metropolitan area whereas KNHL has widespread cable penetration. WJZY in Charlotte, North Carolina, which served as its original affiliate for that market, replaced Antenna TV on its 46.2 subchannel with Movies! (a network part-owned by Fox Television Stations, which bought WJZY in April 2013) on July 1, 2014; WCCB (which, incidentally, assumed the CW affiliation held by WJZY when the latter switched to Fox on July 1, 2013) began carrying Antenna TV on digital subchannel 18.2 on August 15 of that year. WSTR-TV in Cincinnati added the network on January 1, 2016, displacing GetTV on its 64.2 subchannel, one month after the network terminated its affiliation with low-power outlet WOTH-CD2 to expand its coverage within the market.

On November 17, 2015, Tribune announced that it had signed affiliation agreements with the Sinclair Broadcast Group and partner companies Deerfield Media, Cunningham Broadcasting, Howard Stirk Holdings, Tegna Inc., Red River Broadcasting and Media General to add Antenna TV to stations in 26 markets (including many large and mid-sized markets where the network did not previously have an affiliate, including Pittsburgh; Baltimore; Nashville, Tennessee; Birmingham, Alabama; Green Bay, Wisconsin and Savannah, Georgia). On January 6, 2016, the network also announced an agreement with E. W. Scripps Company-owned WMYD in Detroit, which picked up the affiliation in February 2016, six months after WADL disaffiliated from Antenna TV, which briefly left Detroit as the largest market where the network did not have an affiliate. Sean Compton, president of strategic programming and acquisitions for Tribune Broadcasting, credited Antenna TV's acquisition of rights to the Johnny Carson-era Tonight Show episodes in part behind the newfound interest from affiliates, which helped its station portfolio gain ground with competitor MeTV (which has the most affiliates of any American digital multicast network). As a result of these and other agreements stemming from the Carson acquisition, by August 2016, the network had expanded its reach to 86% of U.S. households.

Individual programs aired by the network may be substituted if a station other than that which serves as the market's Antenna TV affiliate holds the local syndication rights; as an example, from April 2012 to November 2013, KTLA aired a rebroadcast of that station's weeknight 6:00 p.m. newscast on Monday through Thursdays over its 5.2 subchannel, in place of the network's broadcast of Married... with Children (which it aired in an hour-long block and was shown locally at 8:00 p.m. Pacific Time Zone), as the local rights to the sitcom were held by Anaheim, California-based independent station KDOC-TV. When Soap replaced Married... on the network's Sunday evening lineup in May 2011, during the latter's original run on Antenna TV, a rebroadcast of KTLA's early evening newscast which aired on that night was dropped in order to allow Soap to air locally.

In markets where an Antenna TV-affiliated station acts as a broadcast partner of either sports syndication service, some of its stations (notably among them, WHNT-TV in Huntsville, Alabama and WOAI-TV in San Antonio) preempt programming carried by the network in order to carry college sports events produced by either the Raycom Sports-operated ACC Network or the Sinclair-owned American Sports Network/Stadium. While these preemptions typically occur on Saturday afternoons, in many instances, such stations may preempt certain programs aired within the network's prime time lineup, either to allow the affiliated subchannel to serve as an alternate feed of the partner sports service in lieu of the parent station's main channel or a co-owned/co-managed sister station, or to carry programs aired by a major broadcast network with which the station maintains a primary affiliation so the events can air on the main channel. Conversely, several stations, mainly affiliated with Fox, have moved their local news to their Antenna TV subchannel due to sports events like the 2018 FIFA World Cup and Thursday Night Football pre-empting regularly scheduled newscasts on the main channel.

In March 2020, new owner Nexstar Media Group brought the network to markets in which it owned stations that did not already have a pre-existing affiliate at the time of their purchase of Tribune. At the start of the fall of 2020, it began to wind down contracts with direct competitors MeTV and COZI TV on their existing stations to increase carriage of Antenna TV, the first of which was WSYR-TV in Syracuse, New York. The group also began to disallow MeTV personalities such as Svengoolie from appearing on their stations in Chicago (WGN-TV and WGN).

== Related services ==
=== Rewind TV ===
In July 2016, Tribune was considering, with the network's success, adding a sister network which would take shows that draw older audiences, in an arrangement that proposed refocusing Antenna TV around shows targeting younger audiences. By April 26, 2021, this idea had evolved and Nexstar Media, successor to Tribune Broadcasting, announced that it would launch a new digital broadcast network, Rewind TV, focusing on sitcoms from the 1980s, 1990s and 2000s, serving as a complementary sister network to and incorporating programming from that timespan that were previously shown on Antenna TV.

Rewind TV began operations on September 1, 2021, with Nexstar Media as the launch station group, making the network available to 50 million households in the United States.
