= Hena Doba =

Pakistani American journalist and television correspondent

- Born: Jackson Heights
- Alma mater: University at Buffalo
- Occupation: Journalist, television presenter
- Employer: CBS; Cheddar; WGN America

Hena Doba is a Pakistani American broadcast journalist for NewsNation. Doba had previously worked for CBS News, where she anchored The National Desk with Hena Doba after working as a national correspondent. She then worked as a correspondent and anchor for Cheddar News, a financial news network.

== Early life ==
Hena Doba was born in Jackson Heights, Queens to Tahmina Faraz and Agha M. Zulfiquar. Doba has three younger sisters. She is a first generation Pakistani American. As a child, her parents raised her speaking Urdu. Throughout her childhood, she lived in many neighborhoods throughout Queens, including Jamaica, Elmhurst, College Point, Rosedale and Jackson Heights. She graduated from Flushing High School.

Before entering college, Doba planned to become a psychologist, but discovered her passion for journalism by writing for The Spectrum, SUNY Buffalo's school paper. She was feature editor. She graduated with a Bachelor's degree in psychology and English in 2002.

== Career ==
Two days after her college graduation, Doba was hired as a producer for Newswatch 50, a local TV station in Watertown, New York City. Doba first went on air during the September 11 attacks. She was home visiting her family in Queens and, as she stated in an interview, "picked up a camcorder and started walking the streets of Queens." At the start of her career, broadcast news was not diverse, leading to racist backlash against Doba. Among other incidents, Doba recalled her news director receiving emails that said things like "Why is the terrorist telling us the news?"

Following her stint at the local news station, Doba moved to work at a station in Savannah, Georgia. Later, she joined WFSB TV in Hartford, Connecticut, where she was the weekend anchor.

Doba became the first person to anchor a national show at 4 a.m and was one of the first Pakistani Americans to anchor a show. She covered stories related to finance and politics throughout the US as a national correspondent. At CBS, Doba anchored The National Desk with Hena Doba.

In 2019, Doba moved to Cheddar News, a financial news network, where she worked as a correspondent and anchor. According to Doba, she had greater creative control in selecting stories and interviewing guests.

In addition to her journalistic work, Doba worked as an adjunct professor at Capital Community College and the Connecticut School of Broadcasting for five years.

On January 11, 2024, Nexstar Media Group and NewsNation announced that Doba was hired to anchor the weekend edition of Morning in America. It debuted on January 27, 2024 and airs every weekend from 7 a.m. to 10 a.m. ET. In June 2026, Doba was moved to anchor NewsNation Prime Weekends, which airs from 8 to 11 p.m ET, replacing Natasha Zouves.

== Personal life ==
Doba is Muslim. In her free time, she enjoys boxing.

On January 23, 2016, she married Andrew Ronald Doba. They met in December 2013 at WFSB, a CBS affiliate station based in Hartford. He was a guest on a political show hosted by Doba's co-anchor, who introduced them.
