= Robert Ditter =

Robert Ditter (23 January 1924, Lauda, Baden − 24 January 2007, Schramberg) was principal of the Gymnasium Schramberg from 1964 to 1988. He was also chief editor of "D'Kräz", a journal for local history in Schramberg.

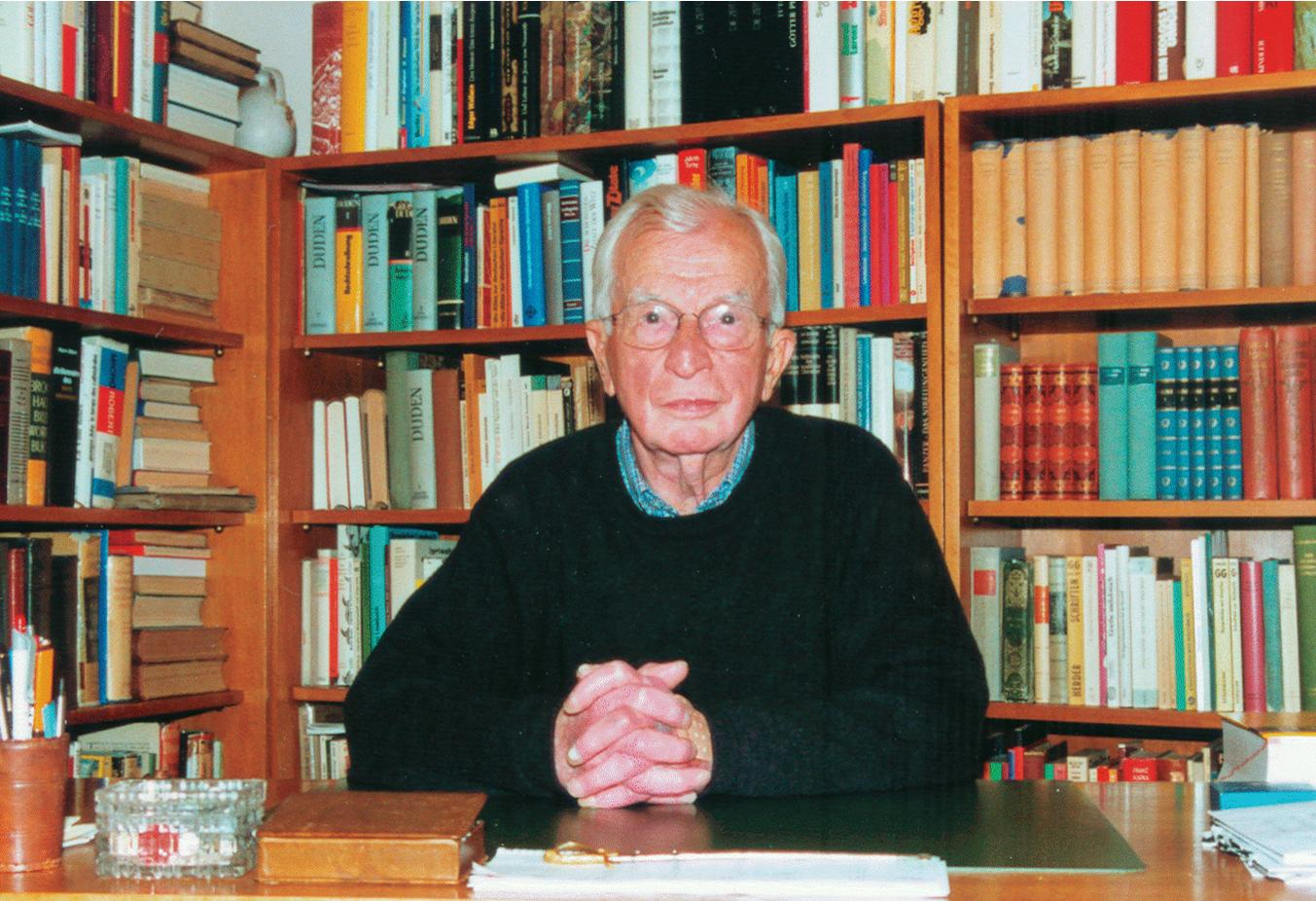
Robert Ditter in his study courtesy of Carsten Kohlmann

== Biography ==
=== Career in education ===
Robert Ditter attended primary school at his birthplace Lauda, and secondary school in Tauberbischofsheim and Rottweil, where he got a provisional abitur-diploma in 1942 and was drafted for the last three years of World War II. From 1945 to 1948 the young lieutenant was in French captivity. After his release he studied German, French and English at the

universities of Freiburg and Tübingen. He took his degree in 1954 and served as a student teacher in Tübingen and, after his second examination in education, taught at the Gymnasium in Tuttlingen.

In 1964 Robert Ditter was appointed principal of the Gymnasium Schramberg – a position that he had until 1988.
Robert Ditter was one of the first (west) German high school principals who organized student exchanges between a German Gymnasium and French, Belgian, and US-American schools.

=== Work as chief editor of "D'Kräz", a journal for regional history ===
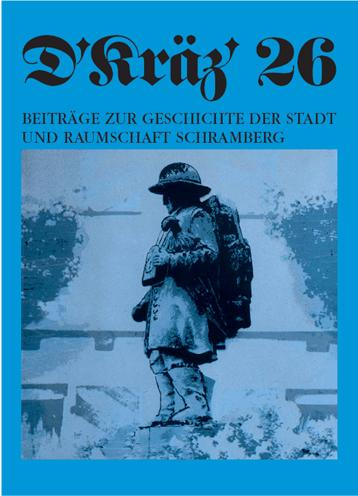
D'Kräz 26 (2006)

Ditter's merits go far beyond his work as an educator and principal of a Gymnasium. From 1981 to 1998 he was chief editor of "D'Kräz", a journal for the history of Schramberg and its vicinity, which was initiated by the voluntary association "Museums- und Geschichtsverein Schramberg". Ditter did not only edit 18 of the annual issues of the magazine, he was also author of a number of articles himself.

== Literature ==
- Gymnasium Schramberg (Ed.): Gymnasium Schramberg – 1840, 1940, 1990 Festschrift zum Doppeljubiläum 150 Jahre Geschichte, 50 Jahre Abitur. Schramberg 1990.
