= DUZ =

German-language magazine, founded 1945

- Circulation: 20,000
- Founded: 1945
- Website: www.duz.de

DUZ is a German-language magazine focusing on science and society. The name is an acronym of Deutsche Universitätszeitung, or "German University Journal" in English.

== History ==
The magazine originated in 1945 from the University of Göttingen in Göttingen, Lower Saxony, Germany. Originally called GUZ for Göttinger Universitätszeitung, it was later changed to DUZ in 1949.

The magazine was published by Josef Raabe since 1964 and became part of the Klett Gruppe in 1979. Its readership was mostly researchers and scientists and was estimated at about 20,000.

DUZ was shut down due to insolvency in 2025, but returned to publication in 2026.
