= Leland Vittert =

American journalist

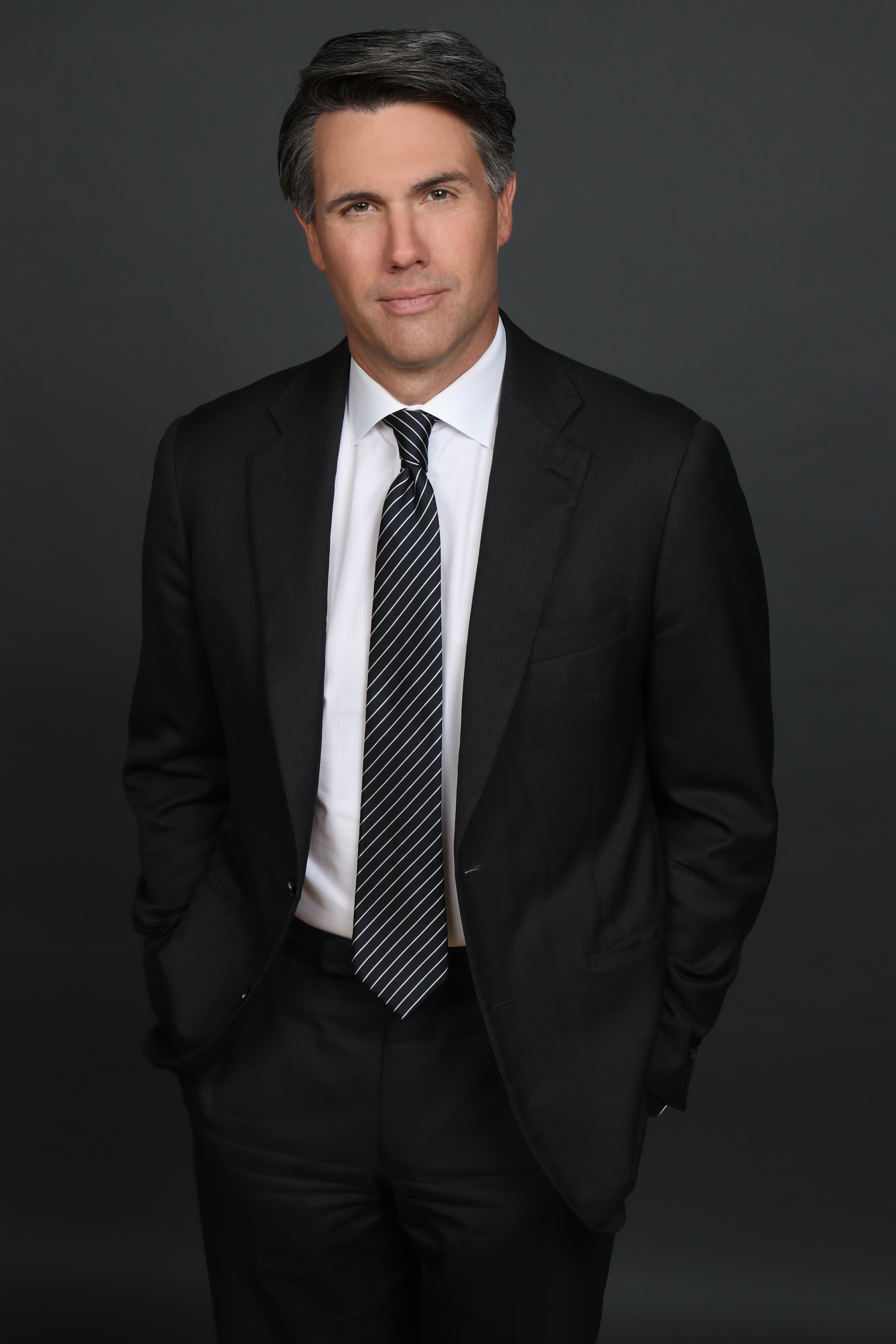
- Vittert in 2018
- Born: August 31, 1982 (age 44); Illinois, U.S.
- Education: Northwestern University (BA)
- Occupations: Journalist, news correspondent, anchor
- Employer: NewsNation
- Spouse: Rachel Ann Putnam (m. 2025)
- Relatives: Liberty Vittert (sister)

Leland Holt Vittert (born August 31, 1982) is an American journalist who is the anchor and national correspondent for NewsNation. He worked for Fox News from 2010 to 2021, initially as a foreign correspondent based in Jerusalem and later as a news presenter. He was a substitute host on Fox & Friends, America's Newsroom, and Happening Now.

== Early life and education ==
Vittert was born on August 31, 1982, in St. Louis, Missouri at Barnes Hospital. Vittert earned a Bachelor of Arts from the Medill School of Journalism at Northwestern University, where he joined Theta Chi. He also completed The General Course, a one-year study abroad program at the London School of Economics.

== Career ==
=== Television reporter ===
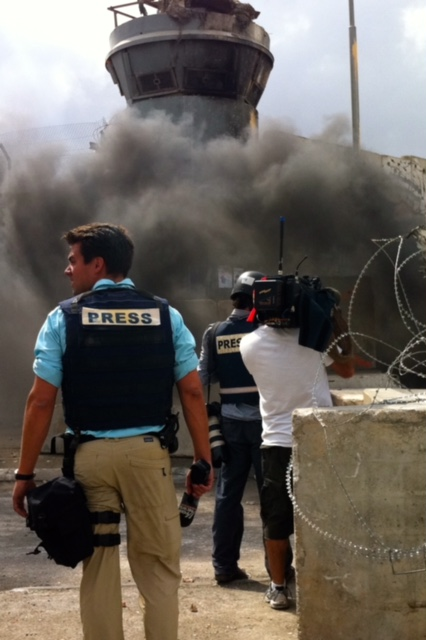
Vittert in 2011

During the 2000s, Vittert anchored the weekend news at KDVR-TV in Denver, Colorado, and was a reporter for WFTV-TV in Orlando, Florida. He was also at KATV-TV in Little Rock, Arkansas, KNWA-TV in Fayetteville, Arkansas, and WMTV-TV in Madison, Wisconsin.

Arriving in the Middle East in 2010, Vittert began following the Arab Spring. In 2011, he was one of the few reporters live on the ground in Cairo's Tahrir Square on the night that Egyptian President Hosni Mubarak left power. Vittert subsequently traveled to Libya during the first days of the country's revolution, where he reported on Muammar Gaddafi's counterattack and later from the besieged city of Misurata.

Vittert covered Operation Pillar of Cloud, the 2012 war between Israel and Hamas. He has interviewed Muhammad al-Zawahiri, the brother of Al-Qaeda leader Ayman al-Zawahiri.

Before coming to Washington, D.C., in 2014, Vittert spent a month in Eastern Ukraine as Russian-backed militias took over parts of the country.

In 2015, Vittert's coverage of the Freddie Gray riots in Baltimore was praised by Mediaite and The Daily Caller. According to Mediaite, Vittert "made his mark…by standing among protesters, facing a silent line of riot police, while interviewing residents and demonstrators affected by the story in various ways. He [broke] news about the Baltimore mayor's alleged stand-down orders for police, and [had] tense question-and-answer exchanges with lawmakers and public figures throughout the city."

While covering the George Floyd protests outside the White House in 2020, Vittert and his crew were assaulted by protesters and later chased away from the area. In an interview the following day on Cavuto Live, Vittert told viewers that he and his crew were attacked after a protester realized they were employed by Fox News.

Vittert's last on-air appearance on Fox News was in January 2021; he left the network in April 2021. A Fox News spokesperson said, "We have mutually and amicably parted ways with Leland Vittert", leaving it unclear whether he quit or was fired. It later emerged that he had been asked to leave by one of the Murdochs after Vittert had asked tough questions of President Donald Trump.

On May 5, 2021, Nexstar announced that Vittert would join NewsNation starting May 17, 2021, as a national correspondent and anchor. On May 17, 2021, Vittert made his first appearance for NewsNation on The Donlon Report and NewsNation Prime. On July 8, 2021, Nexstar announced that Vittert would anchor a primetime show called On Balance with Leland Vittert on NewsNation starting July 19, 2021.

== Personal life ==
Vittert won Westword's Best Hair on a TV Anchor Award in 2007. His sister, Liberty Vittert, is a television chef and clinical professor of data science at the Olin Business School at Washington University in St. Louis.

He married Rachel Ann Putnam on June 7, 2025, in a ceremony officiated by a Universal Life Church minister at San Ysidro Ranch.

=== Memoir ===
In September 2025, Vittert published a memoir titled Born Lucky, in which he revealed for the first time that he is autistic, a diagnosis which came very early in life. The book title references his childhood nickname, Lucky, which came from a doctor who commented on Vittert's surviving his umbilical cord wrapped twice around his neck. Vittert only began to speak at age three. He was bullied mercilessly in school; his father, Mark, actually quit his job to devote his life to getting Leland through his childhood despite the obvious challenge of being autistic. It was Mark, along with Leland's mom Carol, as well as sister Liberty, who helped him survive the situation.
