= West Virginia Public Service Commission =

State agency of West Virginia

The Public Service Commission of West Virginia is the Public Utilities Commission of the State of West Virginia, U.S.A.

== Operation ==
Chairman Charlotte Lane, Renee Larrick, and Bill Raney are the three commissioners. These positions are political appointments with six-year terms. Commissioners are appointed by the Governor and confirmed by the Senate.

The Commission supervises, regulates, and, where appropriate, investigates the rates, service, operations, affiliated transactions, and other activities of West Virginia public utilities and many common and contract motor carriers of passengers and property within West Virginia. Some of the industries the Commission regulates include:

- Electric Utilities
- Natural Gas Utilities
- Telephone Utilities (land line services)
- Private and Publicly Owned Water and Sewer Utilities
- Public Storm Water Service Districts
- Gas Pipeline Safety
- Solid Waste Carriers (intrastate)
- Commercial Solid Waste facilities (landfills)
- Taxi Cabs
- Towing Services that are arranged by someone other than the owner
- Safety, weight, and speed-limit enforcement of all commercial motor vehicles
- Transportation of hazardous materials including identification, registration, and permitting of commercial motor vehicles transporting such materials
- Coal Resource Transportation System (CRTS)
- Railroad Safety
- Regulation of Fees and Charges for Setting and Care of Veterans Grave Markers

The Public Service Commission of West Virginia does not regulate:

- Internet Service Providers
- Private telephone equipment
- Butane, Propane, and Gasoline
- Oil and Gas Wells
- Cable Television Rates
- Long-Distance Telephone Rates
- Wireless cell phone service

== Location ==
The Commission is located at 201 Brooks Street in Charleston. Its regular hours of operation are 9:00 a.m. to 5:00 p.m., Monday through Friday, except on state and federal holidays.

== See also ==
- Virginia Mae Brown
- Brooks McCabe
