= NewsNation =

American subscription television network

- Country: United States
- Broadcast area: Nationwide
- Headquarters: WGN Studios, 2501 W Bradley Place, Chicago, Illinois

Programming
- Language: English
- Picture format: 1080i (HDTV) (downscaled to letterboxed 480i for the SDTV feed)

Ownership
- Owner: Nexstar Media Group
- Key people: Sean Compton (President, Networks: Nexstar Media Group); Michael Corn (President); Cherie Grzech (President of News and Managing Editor)
- Sister channels: WGN-TV and radio (Chicago); Antenna TV; Rewind TV; The CW; True Crime Network; Quest

History
- Launched: November 9, 1978; 48 years ago as WGN-TV; March 1, 2021; 5 years ago (as NewsNation)
- Replaced: WGN America

Links
- Website: www.newsnationnow.com

Availability

Streaming media
- Service(s): DirecTV Stream, FuboTV, Hulu + Live TV, Sling TV, YouTube TV

NewsNation is an American cable news network owned by Nexstar Media Group and headquartered in the WGN Studios in Chicago, Illinois. Known for most of its history as WGN Superstation and Superstation WGN before becoming WGN America in 2008, it relaunched on March 1, 2021, as a cable news network named after its flagship news program. The channel's relaunch came as part of a planned expansion of its news programming. The channel continued to carry some entertainment programming held over from WGN America on weekends, but this was discontinued in July 2024. After being acquired by Nexstar, The Hill and broadcast network The CW have collaborated with NewsNation on content.

In September 2018, the channel, then WGN America, was received by approximately 80 million households that subscribed to a pay television service throughout the United States (or 62.7% of households with at least one television set).

The channel has publicly claimed to be centrist, but in 2021, several NewsNation staff left the network citing concerns they were being pushed by management to lean to right-wing politics in news coverage. By 2026, NewsNation had hired pro-Trump commentator Katie Pavlich and several other Fox News journalists.

== History ==
=== As a superstation ===
WGN America was established on November 9, 1978, when United Video Inc. began redistributing the signal of WGN-TV (channel 9) in Chicago to cable and satellite subscribers throughout the United States. This expanded the prominent independent station into America's second satellite-distributed national "superstation", after Atlanta-based WTBS became TBS.

As the national feed of WGN-TV, the channel broadcast a variety of programming seen on the Chicago signal, including sports (mainly Chicago Cubs and White Sox baseball, as well as Chicago Bulls basketball games); locally originated news, children's, religious and public affairs programs; movies; and syndicated series. Through the 1980s, the WGN local and national feeds maintained nearly identical program schedules, aside from some sporting events that were restricted to the Chicago-area signal under league policy restrictions. After the January 1990 re-imposition of federal syndication exclusivity regulations, programming between the two feeds increasingly deviated as the WGN national feed incorporated alternative syndicated programming to replace shows on the WGN-TV schedule that were subjected to market-exclusivity claims by individual television stations, and some local programs that the national feed chose not to clear; particularly from the late 2000s onward, as the WGN Chicago signal began expanding its local news programming and added lifestyle programs to its schedule.

On December 13, 2014, WGN America was converted by Tribune into a conventional basic cable network, at which time cable providers within the Chicago market started to offer it alongside its existing local carriage on satellite providers DirecTV and Dish Network. Simulcasts of WGN-TV's Chicago-originated local newscasts, news specials and public affairs programs, special events and sports telecasts – with the exception of a one-hour simulcast of WGN-TV's morning news program that was carried early weekday mornings during the transitional period – immediately ceased being shown on a national basis the day prior, while WGN-TV maintained a separate schedule of local and syndicated programs exclusively catering to the Chicago market. The channel began to focus squarely on acquired programming, including shows held over from its superstation era, and by 2015, began to incorporate a limited schedule of original drama and reality series.

=== Conversion to cable news channel ===
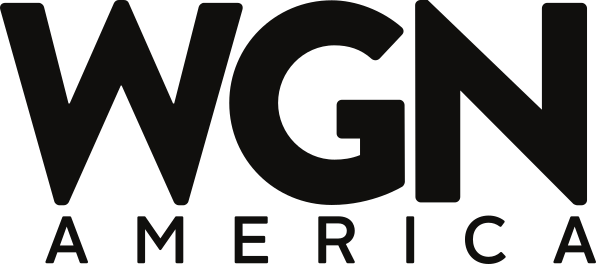
WGN America logo, used from January 2014 until it was renamed as NewsNation in March 2021

On September 1, 2020, WGN America launched a three-hour-long prime time newscast, NewsNation, which began development in October 2019, when Nexstar management commissioned research from television subscribers that determined a share of survey participants were dissatisfied with opinion-based programming on cable news channels such as CNN (which had previously offered straight news programming within its evening lineup, before shifting further into personality-based programming in the mid-2010s), MSNBC (which gravitated toward liberal opinion/talk programs beginning in 2008), and Fox News (developed in 1996 with a conservative-leaning format). The program draws partly from the broadcast and digital resources of Nexstar's television stations (including those acquired by Tribune Media, in addition to WGN America, several months prior). NewsNation boasts the resources of "over 5,000 journalists in 200 newsrooms across America."

During December 2020 and January 2021, Nexstar reached carriage agreements that added WGN America to virtual multichannel television providers YouTube TV (reached on December 1), FuboTV (reached on December 11), Hulu (reached on December 18), Sling TV (reached on December 24, through a broader agreement with Sling parent Dish Network which ended a three-week impasse in which the satellite provider lost access to Nexstar's broadcast stations) and Vidgo (reached on January 14) to expand the channel beyond its existing wireline and satellite distribution footprint, and increase exposure for NewsNation. (AT&T TV had already carried the channel since October 2019).

=== Expansion of news programming ===
On January 25, 2021, Nexstar Media Group announced that it would relaunch WGN America under the NewsNation brand on March 1, cutting all ties with the WGN brand after 43 years. The name change coincided with a gradual expansion of its news programming: expanding to nine hours per day (from six), the revised news schedule was fronted by a splintered expansion of the flagship NewsNation broadcast (adding an hour-long early evening edition, alongside the existing and now reduced two-hour NewsNation Prime) and two host-centered news and interview programs anchored respectively by Joe Donlon and Ashleigh Banfield. NewsNation reduced its schedule of entertainment programs acquired by the channel under the WGN America moniker in daytime and some overnight slots; beginning with the launch of a morning news program in 2021, the acquired entertainment shows were replaced with additional news content once syndication contracts expired.

NewsNation was developed under the management of Sean Compton, who was promoted to executive vice president of WGN America upon completion of the Nexstar purchase, and former WGN-TV news director Jennifer Lyons, who was reassigned by Nexstar to serve as WGN America's vice president of news. However, while the network has marketed itself as having a center-leaning editorial perspective, since its launch, NewsNation has been accused of having a rightward tilt due to its guests and for hiring former Fox News Channel chief and White House Deputy Chief of Staff Bill Shine as a consultant. The news director and managing editor quit following the disclosure of Shine's role in February 2021. Lyons announced her resignation in March amid the controversy and continued low ratings. Amid dissension from NewsNation staffers, Nexstar's CEO affirmed the schedule to convert NewsNation into an "all-news, talk, and opinion" channel by 2023.

In May 2021, Nexstar hired Michael Corn, the senior executive producer of Good Morning America, as its news director to replace Lyons. Corn then named Fox News vice president Cherie Grzech as managing editor. Later that year, NewsNation premiered more opinion programming hosted by cable news veterans Leland Vittert and Dan Abrams, as well as a morning show hosted by former ABC News presenter Adrienne Bankert.

On October 3, 2022, former CNN anchor Chris Cuomo, who had been terminated for advising his brother, New York governor Andrew Cuomo, about how to deal with various scandals, joined the network as host of a new evening program called Cuomo, to replace NewsNation Prime on its weeknight lineup, thus fully converting evening programming to personality-driven opinion and analysis shows. News contributors include former Fox News host Bill O'Reilly, former White House chief of staff Mick Mulvaney, former White House press secretary Sean Spicer and The Washington Post columnist George Will.

On April 1, 2023, overnight drama series and infomercials were replaced with repeats of its evening talk and analysis shows. Then on April 24, NewsNation permanently switched to a 24-hour all-news schedule on weekdays consisting of a four-hour rolling afternoon news block, NewsNation Now (replacing crime dramas in that slot), and an hour-long political news show, The Hill (a broadcast extension of the co-owned publication, replacing an hour of the early evening newscast NewsNation Rush Hour). The network also unveiled a new studio at its New York City bureau (located in the Daily News Building in Midtown, Manhattan, where co-operated CW affiliate WPIX, which also christened a separate new studio on that date, operates). The remaining syndicated scripted series acquired under the WGN America brand that were on the schedule (such as Blue Bloods and Last Man Standing) and time-brokered programs continued to air on weekends outside of prime time.

On June 1, 2024, NewsNation expanded its all-news format to weekends, thereby completing its four-year transition into a 24/7 cable news network. NewsNation had gradually replaced non-news programming in weekend morning and daytime slots (consisting of religious and paid programming in the early morning, and marathon blocks of Blue Bloods—its last remaining entertainment program, which completed its syndication contract the week before the transition—in the late morning and afternoon) with weekend editions of Morning in America, rolling news programs NewsNation Live and NewsNation Now, and the weekly political talk show The Hill Sunday during the first half of 2024. After seeing an increase in viewership during its coverage of the disappearance and killing of Gabby Petito in 2021, NewsNation launched a new series called Missing in America which focused on missing persons cases.

Beginning in September 2024, NewsNation began to carry overflow sports programming from co-owned broadcast network The CW, specifically airing the start of the second game of a college football doubleheader under the CW Football Saturday banner after the first game ran well over its scheduled timeslot or airing the start of the college football game after NASCAR Xfinity Series races run over their scheduled time slot. Such usage of news channels for overflow weekend sports content is not unprecedented, as Fox has similarly used co-owned Fox Business for this purpose. On November 6, 2024, NewsNation and its partner Decision Desk HQ were the first to call the 2024 United States presidential election for Donald Trump.

On December 12, 2025, NewsNation announced Ashleigh Banfield would be ending her nightly 10 p.m. show. Under a new partnership, Banfield is expected to continue as an on-air contributor and lead the network's digital channel devoted to true crime coverage, which will include her podcast, Drop Dead Serious with Ashleigh Banfield. That same month, former Fox News contributor Katie Pavlich was announced to be hosting a political talk show, which assumed Banfield's former slot. Furthermore, former attorney Jesse Weber would host a new talk show at 11 p.m., following Pavlich's show. Both programs debuted on January 19, 2026. The move came after several other Fox News journalists were hired by the network.

==== Coverage of UFO issues ====
In 2023, NewsNation gained significant attention for its focus on UFO issues, to which it devotes more coverage than most other cable news networks. Entertainment executive Aden Ikram, writing in Fortune, stated NewsNation's coverage was "normalizing UAPs by going where no network has gone before" in "sharp contrast" to traditional media's skeptical coverage towards UFO claims. The Washington Post said NewsNation had found a "viewership niche" in UFO coverage.

UFO journalist Ross Coulthart's interview with UFO whistleblower David Grusch in June 2023 earned high ratings for the network. NewsNation's interview with Grusch was repeatedly cited during a United States Congress UFO Hearing in July 2023. NewsNation president Michael Corn told Fortune: "We are a news organization that doesn't dismiss or shy away from any story. Grusch's claims are serious and fascinating—any way you slice it, that's news." NewsNation was forced to issue corrections after incorrectly claiming that The Intercept had obtained leaked information regarding Grusch's mental health.

==== Presidential primary debates and forums ====
During the presidential primaries of the 2024 election, the network hosted their first presidential candidates debates and forums. On December 6, 2023, NewsNation and The CW were the joint television broadcasters of the fourth Republican presidential debate. On January 12, 2024, the network hosted a forum featuring three challengers in the Democratic primaries (Representative Dean Phillips of Minnesota, Marianne Williamson, and Cenk Uygur). Incumbent president Joe Biden was invited to participate, but declined. The forum was moderated by Dan Abrams.

== Availability ==
NewsNation is available on most multichannel television providers (including cable, satellite, IPTV, and fiber-optic-based services) within the United States. However, the channel continues to have somewhat scattershot coverage (outside of satellite distribution) in portions of the Western United States and much of the New England region. Moreover, some multichannel providers in various markets where Tribune Broadcasting had owned a television station prior to the closure of the group's purchase by Nexstar do not carry NewsNation. In the Chicago metropolitan area, NewsNation is carried by the two major cable television providers serving the immediate area (Comcast Xfinity and Astound Broadband, the latter serving areas formerly served by RCN and WOW!) and streaming providers, in addition to WGN-TV.

=== Streaming ===
NewsNation is distributed on virtual MVPD streaming services YouTube TV, Sling TV, Hulu, DirecTV Stream, and FuboTV.

=== Radio ===
On September 1, 2020, at the same time NewsNation was launched, the NewsNation brand expanded to radio by broadcasting its two-minute news headline segment at the top of each hour on Chicago radio station—and network parent Nexstar’s sole radio property—WGN (720 AM). These audio newscasts are also available to listen nationally on the radio section of the network's website and app.

== On-air staff ==
=== Anchors/hosts ===
- Nichole Berlie
- Blake Burman
- Chris Cuomo
- Hena Doba
- Marni Hughes
- Laura Ingle
- Anna Kooiman
- Markie Martin
- Connell McShane
- Alicia Nieves
- Katie Pavlich
- Chris Stirewalt
- Batya Ungar-Sargon
- Elizabeth Vargas
- Leland Vittert
- Jesse Weber

=== Contributors ===
- Sara Azari
- Ashleigh Banfield
- Kurt Bardella
- A. Scott Bolden
- Chris Cillizza
- Jennifer Coffindaffer
- Denise Gitsham
- Lindsey Granger
- Christopher Hahn
- Colby Hall
- Steve Krakauer
- David Montgomery
- Mick Mulvaney
- Richard Y. Newton
- Geraldo Rivera
- Sean Spicer
- Robert Sherman
- Tracy Walder
- George Will
- Lauren Wright
