= Mission Broadcasting =

American television broadcast company

Mission Broadcasting, Inc.
- Company type: Private
- Industry: Broadcasting
- Founded: 1996; 30 years ago
- Founder: David S. Smith
- Headquarters: Wichita Falls, Texas, U.S.
- Key people: Nancie Smith; (chairwoman); Dennis Thatcher; (president)
- Revenue: $51.9 million
- Number of employees: 39
- Website: missionbroadcastinginc.com

Mission Broadcasting, Inc. is a television station group that owns 29 full-power television stations in 26 markets in the United States. The group's chair is Nancie Smith, the widow of David S. Smith, who founded the company in 1996 and died in 2011. All but one of Mission's stations are located in markets where Nexstar Media Group also owns a station, and all of Mission's stations (including its lone stand-alone station) are managed by Nexstar through shared services and local marketing agreements—effectively creating duopolies between the top two stations in a market or in markets with too few stations or unique station owners to legally allow duopolies. The company moved its headquarters from Westlake, Ohio, to Wichita Falls, Texas, in 2018. The company's stations are based in markets as large as New York City and as small as Grand Junction, Colorado.

== History ==
In 1996, Mission Broadcasting was started with its first stations were WUPN in Greensboro and WUXP in Nashville. Both of these were owned by ABRY shareholders, and operated through an SSA by Sullivan Broadcasting, a company affiliated with ABRY Broadcast Partners, which was absorbed into Sinclair Broadcast Group in 1998. In 2001, Sinclair bought these two stations outright. Another related ABRY-affiliated company Bastet Broadcasting, was absorbed into Mission Broadcasting by 2002.

On December 19, 2013, Mission Broadcasting announced it was acquiring KFQX, a Fox affiliate in Grand Junction, Colorado, for $4 million. The sale was approved on February 27, 2017 and finalized on March 31.

During 2020, Mission acquired several more television stations, starting that March with Fox affiliates KMSS-TV in Shreveport, Louisiana, KPEJ-TV in Odessa, Texas, and KLJB in Davenport, Iowa, from Marshall Broadcasting Group for $49 million. The sale was completed on September 1, 2020.

They were followed up on July 13 by Nexstar transferring its option to purchase WPIX in New York City, a CW affiliate from The E. W. Scripps Company to Mission Broadcasting. Mission exercised the option and announced it was acquiring WPIX for $75 million. Once the transaction closed on December 30, WPIX became Mission's first station in a market without an accompanied Nexstar station, as an outright acquisition of WPIX (which broadcasts on virtual and VHF digital channel 11, and is thus not eligible for a UHF discount) by Nexstar would have caused Nexstar to well exceed the 39 percent market reach cap.

Then that August alone, Mission announced the acquisition of five more stations. On August 7, Mission announced the purchases of CW affiliate KWBQ in Santa Fe, New Mexico, and its satellites and its MyNetworkTV sister KASY-TV in Albuquerque from Tamer Media LLC. This was followed up by acquisitions of dual ABC and CW+ affiliate WLAJ in Lansing, Michigan, and Fox affiliate WXXA-TV in Albany, New York, from Shield Media. These sales were finalized and completed in November of that year.

Then on August 31, it was announced that Nexstar executed an option to purchase dual Fox and CW affiliate WNAC-TV in Providence, Rhode Island, for $64,000. The option had been in place since 2003 when LIN TV owned sister station, then and now CBS affiliate WPRI-TV with Nexstar assigning the WNAC license to Mission. The sale was completed on June 16, 2021.

On May 17, 2023, Mission announced a deal to acquire MyNetworkTV affiliate WADL in Detroit (licensed to Mount Clemens) from founder Adell Broadcasting for $75 million. Mission will once again contract with Nexstar to operate the station much like Mission's other stations, effectively ending 34 years of local ownership. If approved and finalized, WADL would have been the 30th station in Mission's portfolio and only its second station in Michigan alongside affiliate WLAJ and only the second station without a companion Nexstar station alongside WPIX. The sale was called off on May 22, 2024, after Mission filed a non-consummation notice with the FCC.

On March 21, 2024, the FCC ruled Mission's ownership of WPIX to be an illegal circumvention of its ownership limits, due to Nexstar treating the station like its own as well as holding a considerable amount of the company's debt, and ordered Nexstar to either sell it to an independent third party or sell off some of its other stations to buy WPIX outright. The decision came as local marketing agreements and similar licensing deals came under increased scrutiny by the FCC. Nexstar stated its intent to dispute the ruling, claiming that it had always complied with FCC regulations.

== Television stations ==
Stations are arranged alphabetically by state and by city of license.

| Media market | State | Station | Purchased | Current affiliation | Nexstar sister station(s) |
|---|---|---|---|---|---|
| Little Rock | Arkansas | KLRT-TV | 2013 | Fox; The CW | KARK-TV; KARZ-TV |
| Little Rock | Arkansas | KASN | 2013 | The CW | KARK-TV; KARZ-TV |
| Grand Junction | Colorado | KFQX | 2017 | Fox; CBS | KREX-TV; KGJT-CD |
| Rockford, Illinois | Illinois | WTVO | 2004 | ABC; MyNetworkTV | WQRF-TV |
| Evansville, Indiana | Indiana | WTVW | 2011 | The CW | WEHT |
| Terre Haute, Indiana | Indiana | WAWV-TV | 2003 | ABC | WTWO |
| Davenport, Iowa | Iowa | KLJB | 2020 | Fox | WHBF-TV; KGCW |
| Monroe | Louisiana | KTVE | 2007 | NBC; Fox | KARD |
| Shreveport, Louisiana | Louisiana | KMSS-TV | 2020 | Fox | KTAL-TV; KSHV-TV |
| Lansing | Michigan | WLAJ | 2020 | ABC; The CW | WLNS-TV |
| Joplin | Missouri | KODE-TV | 2002 | ABC | KSNF |
| Springfield–Branson | Missouri | KOLR | 2003 | CBS | KOZL-TV; KRBK |
| Hardin–Billings | Montana | KHMT | 2004 | Fox | KSVI |
| Albuquerque–Santa Fe | New Mexico | KWBQ | 2020 | The CW | KRQE |
| Albuquerque–Santa Fe | New Mexico | KASY-TV | 2020 | MyNetworkTV | KRQE |
| Roswell | New Mexico | KRWB-TV (Note: Satellite of KWBQ.) | 2020 | The CW | KRQE |
| Albany | New York | WXXA-TV | 2020 | Fox | WTEN |
| New York City | New York | WPIX | 2020 | The CW | None |
| Utica–Rome | New York | WUTR | 2004 | ABC; MyNetworkTV | WFXV; WPNY-LD |
| Erie | Pennsylvania | WFXP | 1998 | Fox | WJET-TV |
| Wilkes-Barre–Scranton | Pennsylvania | WYOU | 1998 | CBS | WBRE-TV |
| Providence | Rhode Island | WNAC-TV | 2021 | Fox | WPRI-TV |
| Abilene–Sweetwater | Texas | KRBC-TV | 2003 | NBC | KTAB-TV |
| Amarillo | Texas | KCIT | 1999 | Fox | KAMR-TV |
| Lubbock | Texas | KAMC | 2003 | ABC | KLBK-TV |
| Odessa–Midland | Texas | KPEJ-TV | 2020 | Fox | KMID |
| San Angelo | Texas | KSAN-TV | 2003 | NBC | KLST |
| Wichita Falls | Texas | KJTL | 1999 | Fox | KFDX-TV |
| Burlington | Vermont | WVNY | 2013 | ABC | WFFF-TV |

== Former stations ==
| Media market | State | Station | Purchased | Sold |
|---|---|---|---|---|
| Greensboro–Winston-Salem | North Carolina | WUPN-TV | 1996 | 2001 |
| Nashville | Tennessee | WUXP-TV | 1996 | 2001 |
| Amarillo | Texas | KCPN-LD | 1999 | 2021 |
| Harlingen–Brownsville | Texas | KGBT-TV | 2021 | 2021 |
| Wichita Falls | Texas | KJBO-LD | 1999 | 2021 |

== See also ==
- Duopoly (broadcasting)
- Cunningham Broadcasting and Deerfield Media—similar holding companies related to Sinclair Broadcast Group
- White Knight Broadcasting
