= KPEJ-TV =

Television station in Odessa, Texas

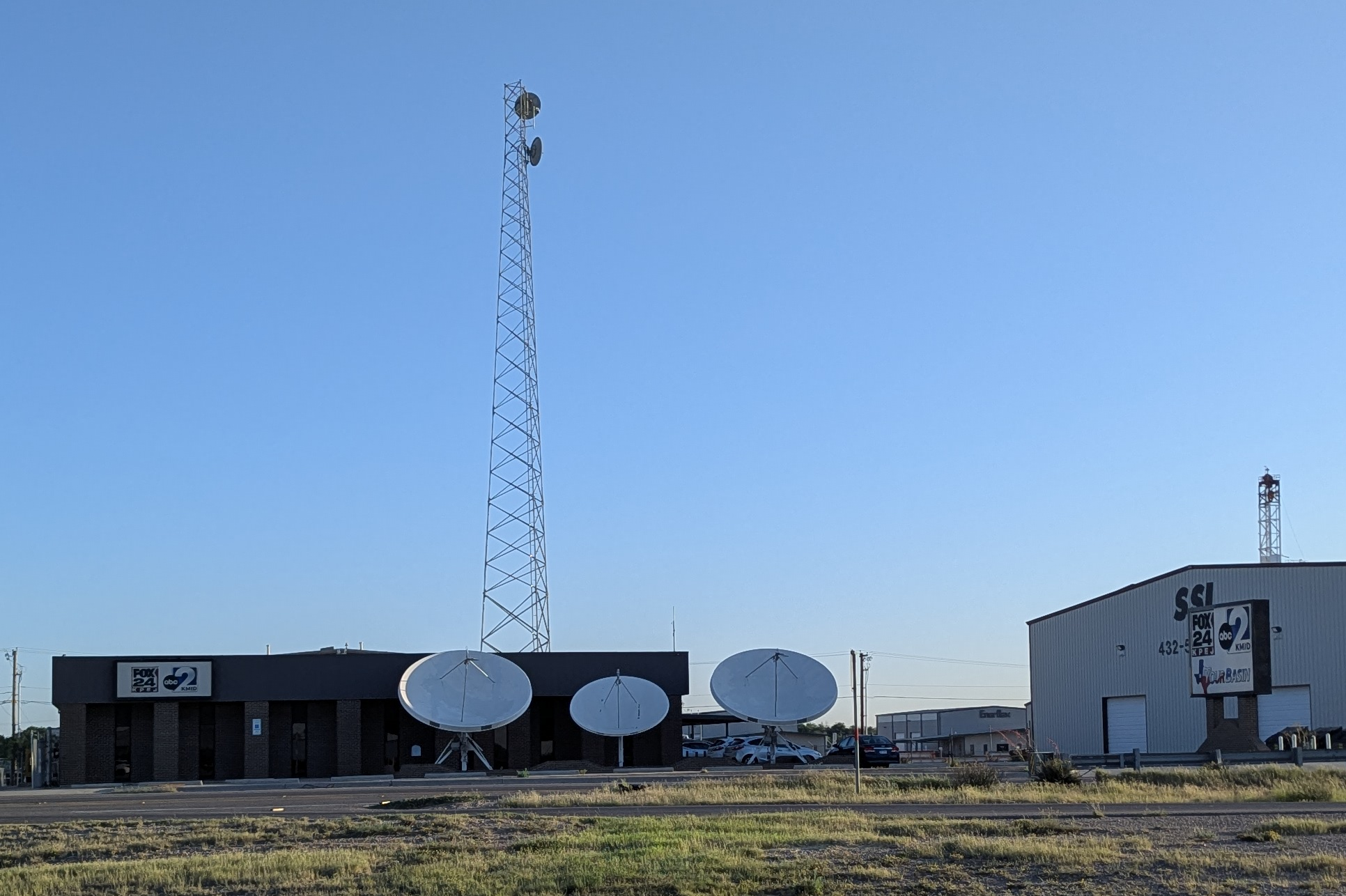
- KMID–KPEJ-TV studios in Odessa
- Odessa–Midland, Texas; United States
- City: Odessa, Texas
- Channels: Digital: 23 (UHF); Virtual: 24
- Branding: Fox 24; Fox 24 News

Programming
- Affiliations: 24.1: Fox; for others, see § Subchannels

Ownership
- Owner: Mission Broadcasting, Inc.
- Operator: Nexstar Media Group
- Sister stations: KMID; Tegna: KWES-TV

History
- Founded: December 26, 1984
- First air date: June 16, 1986
- Former call signs: KPEJ (1986–2009)
- Former channel numbers: Analog: 24 (UHF, 1986–2009)
- Former affiliations: Independent (1986–1987); UPN (secondary, 1998–2003)
- Call sign meaning: randomly assigned

Technical information
- Licensing authority: FCC
- Facility ID: 12524
- ERP: 600 kW
- HAAT: 333 m (1,093 ft)
- Transmitter coordinates: 32°5′51.4″N 102°17′22.5″W

Links
- Public license information: Public file; LMS
- Website: www.yourbasin.com

KPEJ-TV (channel 24) is a television station licensed to Odessa, Texas, United States, serving as the Fox affiliate for the Permian Basin area. It is owned by Mission Broadcasting and operated by Nexstar Media Group alongside ABC affiliate KMID (channel 2); Nexstar's Tegna subsidiary owns NBC affiliate KWES-TV (channel 9). KPEJ-TV and KMID share studios on Windview Street (along I-20) in southwestern Odessa; KPEJ-TV's transmitter is located on FM 1788 in rural southeastern Andrews County.

== History ==
The station first signed on the air on June 16, 1986; it originally operated as an independent station and was owned by Southwest Multimedia. In September 1987, KPEJ became the Midland–Odessa market's Fox affiliate. Southwest Multimedia sold the station to Associated Broadcasters of Lafayette (later renamed Communications Corporation of America) in 1990. In 1998, the station began carrying programming from the United Paramount Network (UPN) as a secondary affiliation; UPN programming moved to CBS affiliate KOSA-TV (channel 7) in 2003, when that station launched a second digital subchannel (later affiliated with MyNetworkTV and now with The CW Plus as a satellite of KCWO-TV (channel 4)). In August 2007, KPEJ changed its on-air branding from "Fox 24" to "Fox West Texas"; the following year, it reverted to the "Fox 24" brand, but continued to use the "Fox West Texas" brand for its website and other special promotions.

On April 24, 2013, the Communications Corporation of America announced the sale of its television stations to the Nexstar Broadcasting Group, owner of ABC affiliate KMID (channel 2). Since the Odessa–Midland market has only eight full-power stations, Nexstar could not legally purchase KPEJ (Federal Communications Commission rules require a market to have eight remaining unique station owners after a duopoly is formed). In addition, KMID and KPEJ are two of the four highest-rated stations in the market in monthly total-day viewership, respectively ranking at third and fourth place. As a result, Nexstar planned to sell KPEJ's license assets to Mission Broadcasting, with Nexstar assuming the station's operation under a shared services agreement, which would have formed a virtual duopoly with KMID.

However, on June 6, 2014, Nexstar announced that it would instead sell KPEJ-TV, along with two other Fox affiliates—sister station KMSS-TV in Shreveport, Louisiana and KLJB in Davenport, Iowa—to the Marshall Broadcasting Group (marking the company's first television station acquisitions) for $58.5 million. The minority-owned Marshall intends to fund the acquisitions through borrowings guaranteed by Nexstar, and are subject to FCC approval of the other stations Nexstar plans to acquire from ComCorp, White Knight Broadcasting and Grant Broadcasting; Marshall plans to launch news operations and provide sports and minority-oriented public affairs programming to KMSS and the other two stations, with Nexstar providing sales and certain non-programming services (including engineering, master control and other administrative functions). The sale was completed on January 1, 2015.

On December 3, 2019, Marshall Broadcasting Group filed for Chapter 11 bankruptcy protection. Mission Broadcasting, another company associated with Nexstar Media Group, agreed to purchase Marshall Broadcasting's stations for $49 million on March 30, 2020. The transaction was completed on September 1, 2020.

== Programming ==
After Fox acquired the rights to the NFL's National Football Conference in 1994, KPEJ has carried preseason football games from the Dallas Cowboys, along with team owner Jerry Jones' weekly game discussion program. In 2010, KPEJ also acquired the rights to Houston Texans preseason games, which aired on tape delay if the game started while a Cowboys pre-game broadcast or preseason game telecast was ongoing. KPEJ lost the Dallas Cowboys preseason games to NBC affiliate KWES-TV in 2011, resulting in KPEJ broadcasting Texans preseason games live. In 2014, KMID acquired the rights to the Dallas Cowboys preseason games. When conflicts exist that won't allow KMID to air the games, KPEJ has been given the rights to air the Dallas Cowboys preseason games. When Dallas plays Houston in the preseason, KMID airs the Dallas broadcast while KPEJ airs the Texans broadcast.

== Technical information ==
=== Subchannels ===
The station's signal is multiplexed:

Subchannels of KPEJ-TV
Subchannel	Res.	Short name	Programming
24.1	720p	KPEJ-TV	Fox
24.2	480i	KPEJ-SD	Estrella TV
24.3	480i	Rewind	Rewind TV
24.4	480i	Antenna	Antenna TV (4:3)

=== Analog-to-digital conversion ===
KPEJ-TV ended regular programming on its analog signal, over UHF channel 24, on June 12, 2009, the official date on which full-power television stations in the United States transitioned from analog to digital broadcasts under federal mandate. The station's digital signal remained on its pre-transition UHF channel 23, using virtual channel 24.

As part of the SAFER Act, KPEJ kept its analog signal on the air until June 26 to inform viewers of the digital television transition through a loop of public service announcements from the National Association of Broadcasters.
