= The Milt Grant Show =

American television program

The Milt Grant Show is an American teen dance television show hosted by Milton "Milt" Grant (1923–2007). It aired on WTTG (channel 5), an independent station in Washington, D.C., from 1956 until 1961. Similar in tone to Philadelphia station WFIL-TV's Bandstand, the program was not only the market's highest-rated television program throughout much of its run but preceded a lifelong career in television station management and ownership for Grant. The program was regarded as a cultural icon of late 1950s and early 1960s Washington.

== Background ==
Milton Grant's broadcasting career began in radio after graduating from Columbia University and New York University, with stints at WARM in Scranton, Pennsylvania, and Washington, D.C. stations WTOP and WINX from 1947 to 1953. Working exclusively at WOL starting in 1953, Grant started hosting the weekly movie, dancing and talent show program Marion Showcase over WTTG the following year.

== Full-time TV work ==
Each show began with Mr. Grant calling, "Hi, kids!"

"Hi, Milt," they answered.

"What's our favorite drink?"

"Pepsi!" they shouted, in an early example of embedded advertising carefully crafted by Mr. Grant.

— Matt Schudel, in Grant's 2007 obituary in The Washington Post

WTTG launched Milt Grant's Record Hop on July 22, 1956, with WOL simulcasting the television station's audio. Grant's show, which had added support of area police and civic organizations as a "constructive approach" against juvenile delinquency, originated from a ballroom at the Raleigh Hotel six days a week (weekday afternoons at 5 p.m. and noon on Saturdays). Grant both produced the show and sold its advertising, with Pepsi as his most notable client. After signing a contract with WTTG in October 1956, Grant severed his ties with WOL. The show began to be referred to as The Milt Grant Show by April 1957.

During its five-year run, the show became a Washington cultural touchstone. High-profile stars of the day—such as Link Wray, Chuck Berry, Buddy Holly, Frankie Avalon, Nat King Cole, Bobby Darin, Ike & Tina Turner, Harry Belafonte, and Fabian—as well as regional acts like The Jaguars, a band featuring Charlie Daniels, were guests on the show during its run. Carl Bernstein, later an investigative reporter, described himself as a "semiregular" dancer on the show. Mark Opsasnick, a cultural historian whose book Capitol Rock chronicles the history of rock and roll music in the Washington area, credited Grant with being "one of the most important pioneers" in the genre's early years locally. When the ABC network debuted American Bandstand and the two shows aired opposite each other, the Grant program attracted higher ratings in Washington. The program was also lucrative for Grant; at one point, Grant's contract had to be renegotiated because he was making more money than John Kluge, the CEO of WTTG owner Metropolitan Broadcasting.

However, not everyone was always welcome on the show. Black dancers were only allowed on Tuesdays, and they were not allowed to dance with White partners. Years after Grant's run ended, it would fall to WOOK-TV, a new ultra high frequency (UHF) station that pioneered programming for the Black community in Washington, to fill this gap for Black audiences with its Teenarama Dance Party.

== Cancellation ==
WTTG opted to cancel The Milt Grant Show after its April 15, 1961, edition. The move disappointed Grant, baffled media experts, and led high schoolers to picket The Washington Post, hoping to draw attention to their cause. Grant then started hosting weekend shows on a "teen network" of four suburban Washington stations: WPGC, WAVA, WINX, and WEEL.

Grant went on to a career in independent station management and ownership, which began with the founding of WDCA-TV (channel 20) in Washington in 1966 and continued in other cities until he died in 2007. However, he expressed continued fondness for the time he spent hosting The Milt Grant Show. In 1990, when he returned to Washington for a National Archives screening of the only surviving footage of the program, he called his time hosting the program "very important". He told the audience, "We were part of the great new beginning of television and there was just so much energy. It made me fall in love with television and all its powers." Grant would later note the importance of his disc jockey years in his career as a television station owner: "I learned about the audiences and how to influence them so they respond to what you ask them to do."

== See also ==
- The Buddy Deane Show
- The Clay Cole Show
- The Groovy Show
- John Waters
