= List of American Broadcasting Company affiliates known as ABC2 =

ABC2 was a digital television channel that was part of the Australian Broadcasting Corporation, which has been branded as ABC Family since 2024.

ABC2 may also refer to one of the following television stations in the US affiliated with the American Broadcasting Company:

== Current affiliates ==
- KATN in Fairbanks, Alaska
- KATU in Portland, Oregon
- KMID-TV in Midland–Odessa, Texas
- KQTV in St. Joseph, Missouri
- KTWO-TV in Casper–Riverton, Wyoming
- WBAY-TV in Green Bay, Wisconsin
- WBRZ-TV in Baton Rouge, Louisiana
- WKRN-TV in Nashville, Tennessee
- WMAR-TV in Baltimore, Maryland
- WSB-TV in Atlanta, Georgia

== Formerly affiliated ==
- KREM (TV) in Spokane, Washington (1954–1976)
- KENI-TV (now KTUU-TV) in Anchorage, Alaska (1953–1971)
- KJVI in Jackson, Wyoming (now WDPN-TV in Wilmington, Delaware; 1991–1996)
- KTVN in Reno, Nevada (1967–1972)
- KTVI in St. Louis, Missouri (1957–1995)
- KUTV in Salt Lake City, Utah (1954–1960)
- WCBD in Charleston, South Carolina (1962–1996)
- WDTN in Dayton, Ohio (1980–2004)
- WGRZ in Buffalo, New York (1956–1958)
