= KGCW =

Television station in Burlington, Iowa

ATSC 3.0 station
- Burlington–Davenport–Bettendorf, Iowa; Moline–Rock Island, Illinois; United States
- City: Burlington, Iowa
- Channels: Digital: 21 (UHF); Virtual: 26
- Branding: Quad Cities CW

Programming
- Affiliations: 26.1: The CW; 26.4: CBS; for others, see § Technical information and subchannels

Ownership
- Owner: Nexstar Media Group; (Nexstar Media Inc.)
- Sister stations: KLJB, WHBF-TV; Tegna: WQAD-TV

History
- First air date: January 5, 1988
- Former call signs: KJMH (1988–2001); KGWB-TV (2001–2006); KGCW-TV (2006–2009)
- Former channel numbers: Analog: 26 (UHF, 1988–2009); Digital: 41 (UHF, 2003–2020)
- Former affiliations: Independent (1988, 1994); Fox (1988–1994, 1996–2001); The WB (2001–2006)
- Call sign meaning: Grant (previous owner) CW

Technical information
- Licensing authority: FCC
- Facility ID: 7841
- ERP: 1,000 kW
- HAAT: 316.4 m (1,038 ft)
- Transmitter coordinates: 41°19′39″N 90°22′46″W

Links
- Public license information: Public file; LMS
- Website: www.ourquadcities.com

KGCW (channel 26) is a television station licensed to Burlington, Iowa, United States, serving as the CW network outlet for the Quad Cities area. It is owned by Nexstar Media Group alongside CBS affiliate WHBF-TV (channel 4) and co-managed with Fox affiliate KLJB (channel 18); Nexstar's Tegna subsidiary owns ABC affiliate WQAD-TV (channel 8). KGCW, WHBF-TV and KLJB share studios in the Telco Building on 18th Street in downtown Rock Island, Illinois; KGCW's transmitter is located near Orion, Illinois.

Channel 26 began broadcasting as KJMH, a local station for Burlington, in January 1988 and became a Fox affiliate that July. It was owned by local businessman Steve Hoth, who named it for his wife, JoEllen M. Hoth. In May 1994, the station lost access to Fox programming after the network moved to strip KJMH of its affiliation. It then went off the air that November.

Grant Communications acquired the station and returned it to the air on March 1, 1996, rebroadcasting KLJB-TV in Davenport. In January 2001, channel 26 was split from channel 18 to become the affiliate of The WB in the Quad Cities, where it was seen on cable and a subchannel of KLJB, and its transmitter was relocated from Burlington to a site that offered increased coverage of the Quad Cities. The station became affiliated with The CW in 2006 when The WB and UPN merged. Nexstar acquired the Grant stations in 2014, coinciding with the separate purchase of WHBF-TV.

== History ==
=== KJMH: The Hoth years ===
Burlington Broadcast Company, which was owned by local businessman Steve Hoth, obtained a construction permit for a new television station in Burlington in 1984. The station went unbuilt for three years. An intended November 1987 launch was scrapped because of equipment problems. KJMH—named for JoEllen M. Hoth, Steve's wife—began broadcasting on January 5, 1988. The station, airing a mix of independent station programming and (for a time) a local newscast, represented a $1 million investment. It broadcast with an effective radiated power of 200,000 watts from a transmitting facility at Roosevelt Avenue and Winegard Drive in Burlington, sufficient only to reach the Burlington area: Mount Pleasant sat on the edge of the contour, and cities such as Keokuk and Muscatine were outside of its signal range.

Even though KJMH affiliated with Fox on July 31, 1988, financial precarity was a major issue in the station's early history. Amid reports that the station's payroll checks were bouncing, the general manager resigned in 1991. Two years later, in November 1993, Fox moved to strip KJMH of its affiliation. Hoth hired a Chicago law firm to fight the disaffiliation in court but was unsuccessful, and KJMH ceased airing Fox programming in May 1994. The station then aired programming from home shopping service ValueVision and Channel America, which had historically catered to low-power stations.

In November 1994, Hoth announced the sale of 80 percent of the station to Kelley Broadcasting for $405,000; Kelley, a consortium of investors based in Texas, planned to affiliate KJMH with the forthcoming UPN network. Additionally, it was announced that the station would leave the air for four to six weeks for equipment installation and refurbishing. Channel 26 did not return after the four-week period of silence, and financial questions continued to swirl. In February 1995, the law firm that had been hired to fight KJMH's disaffiliation sued for nonpayment. Hoth would later file bankruptcy for Burlington Broadcasting and a related company in October 1996; the then-former licensee of the station owed more than $444,000 against $38,000 in assets.

=== Grant Broadcasting ownership ===
The Kelley sale was never filed with the FCC; instead, in March 1995, Grant Broadcasting filed to purchase KJMH from Hoth for $400,000. The station was restored to service on March 1, 1996, as a full-time rebroadcaster of Grant-owned KLJB-TV, the Fox affiliate in Davenport.

Grant Broadcasting intended to eventually air separate programming on the station from the start. KLJB-TV had previously acquired the rights to programming from The WB in the Quad Cities market in September 1999 as a result of Superstation WGN ceasing carriage of WB programming nationally; selected WB shows aired in late night time slots on channel 18. In January 2001, The WB programming moved from a secondary affiliation on KLJB–KJMH to channel 26 alone, which was added to Quad Cities cable systems and changed its call sign to KGWB-TV. Initially, KGWB-TV broadcast its own programming for half of the broadcast day, continuing to air KLJB-TV's programming in other time slots.

While branded as channel 26, the Burlington signal was so far from the Quad Cities that another station was allowed to operate on the channel: low-power WBQD-LP debuted in 2002 as the Quad Cities area's UPN affiliate. KGWB-TV programming was made available over-the-air in the Quad Cities as early as 2003 as a subchannel on KLJB-TV's digital signal. After splitting channel 26's programming, Grant invested in a relocation of the KGWB-TV transmitter facility from Burlington to Seaton, Illinois, midway between Burlington and the Quad Cities, to increase the station's availability in the more populous Quad Cities area.

KGWB-TV became the local affiliate of The CW in 2006, upon the merger of The WB and UPN, under new KGCW-TV call letters.

=== Nexstar ownership ===
Grant Broadcasting announced the sale of its stations for $87.5 million to Nexstar Broadcasting Group in November 2013. It was the second acquisition by Nexstar involving a Quad Cities-market television station in six weeks; in September, Nexstar had announced the acquisition of WHBF-TV in Rock Island, Illinois. The Grant purchase closed in December 2014, along with the acquisition of KLJB by Marshall Broadcasting Group under a deal in which Nexstar continued to provide services via a shared services agreement; Nexstar could own WHBF-TV with KGCW outright but not with KLJB, which was one of the top four-rated stations in the market. In May 2015, KGCW's Quad Cities simulcast—still needed to serve some viewers who could not receive a strong signal from Seaton—moved from a subchannel of KLJB to a subchannel of WHBF-TV as a consequence of the ownership change, a move that had been anticipated for months. Another effect was that KLJB and KGCW could no longer share syndicated programming.

In 2020, KGCW moved its transmitter to a new tower at Orion, from where other Quad Cities stations are broadcast. This coincided with the repack from the 2016 United States wireless spectrum auction, which moved the station to channel 21. As a result, the WHBF-TV subchannel simulcast was discontinued.

In August 2025, Nexstar agreed to acquire Tegna—owner of ABC affiliate WQAD-TV (channel 8)—for $6.2 billion. The deal was completed on March 19, 2026, and included approval for Nexstar to own three full-power station licenses in markets such as the Quad Cities. A temporary restraining order issued one week later by the U.S. District Court for the Eastern District of California, later escalated to a preliminary injunction, has prevented WQAD from being integrated into WHBF/KGCW/KLJB.

== Technical information and subchannels ==
Subchannels provided by KGCW (ATSC 1.0)
Subchannel	Res.	Short name	Programming	ATSC 1.0 host
26.1	720p	KGCW-DT	The CW	KLJB
26.2	480i	Rewind	Rewind TV	WHBF-TV
26.3	480i	Laff	Laff	WHBF-TV
26.4	480i	CBS-SD	CBS (WHBF-TV) in SD	KLJB

Simulcast of subchannels of another station

=== ATSC 3.0 lighthouse ===
Subchannels of KGCW (ATSC 3.0)
Subchannel	Short name	Programming
4.1	WHBF	CBS (WHBF-TV)
6.1	KWQC	NBC (KWQC-TV)
18.1	KLJB	Fox (KLJB)
26.1	KGCW	The CW

Subchannel broadcast with digital rights management

The station began ATSC 3.0 broadcasting on December 19, 2024.

=== Analog-to-digital conversion ===
KGCW was the only Quad Cities-market station to cease analog broadcasts on February 17, 2009, the original date on which full-power television stations in the United States were to transition from analog to digital broadcasts under federal mandate. The station's digital signal remained on its pre-transition UHF channel 41, using virtual channel 26.
