= WHBF-TV =

Television station in Rock Island, Illinois

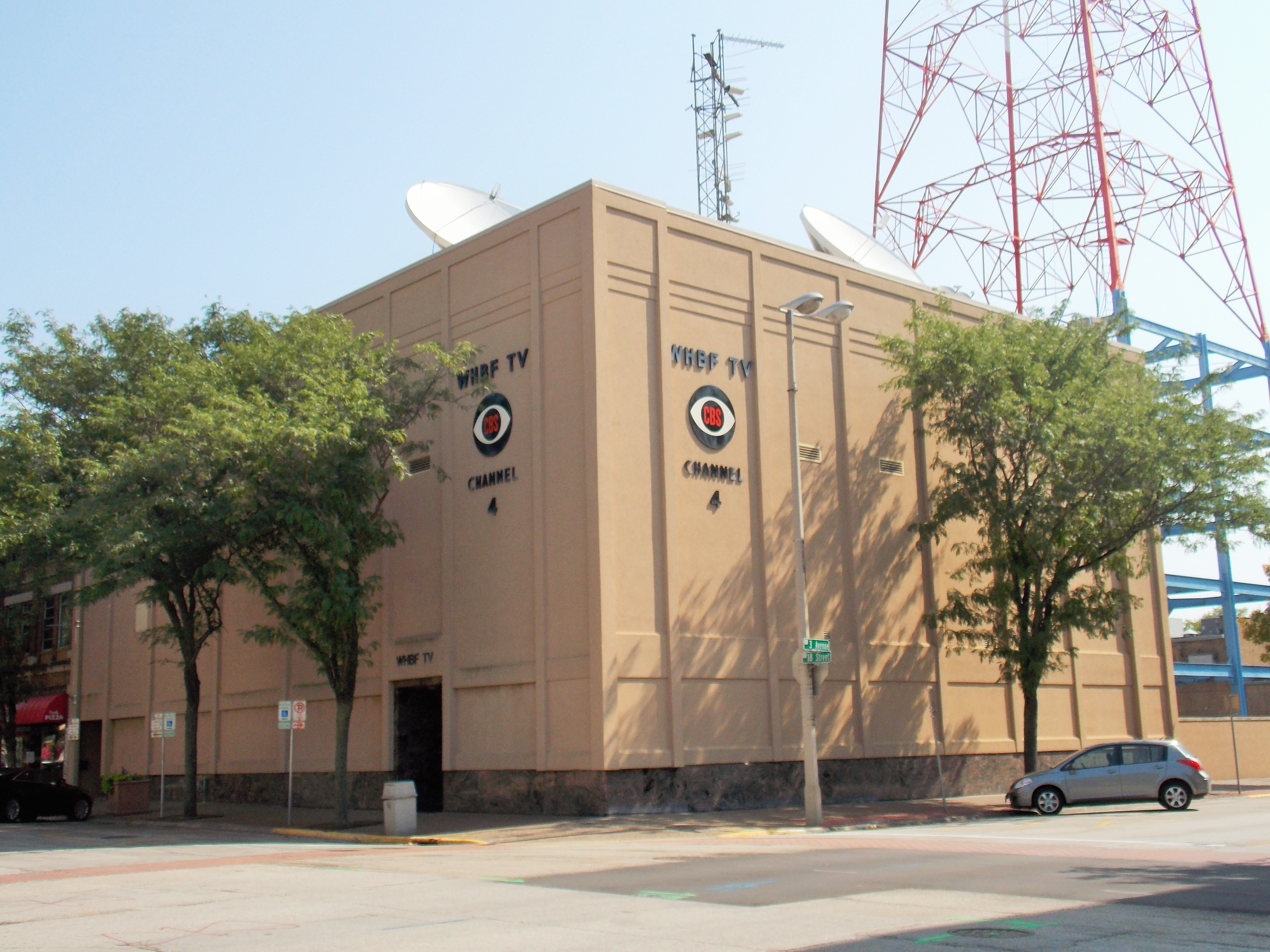
- The WHBF-TV studios in downtown Rock Island.
- Rock Island–Moline, Illinois; Davenport–Bettendorf, Iowa; United States
- City: Rock Island, Illinois
- Channels: Digital: 4 (VHF); Virtual: 4
- Branding: Local 4; Our Quad Cities News

Programming
- Affiliations: 4.1: CBS; for others, see § Subchannels

Ownership
- Owner: Nexstar Media Group; (Nexstar Media Inc.)
- Sister stations: KLJB, KGCW; Tegna: WQAD-TV

History
- First air date: July 1, 1950
- Former channel numbers: Analog: 4 (VHF, 1950–2009); Digital: 58 (UHF, 1999–2009)
- Former affiliations: All secondary: ABC (1950–1963); DuMont (1950–1956); NTA (1956–1961)
- Call sign meaning: "Where Historic Black Hawk Fought" (a reference to Chief Black Hawk, whose tribe once occupied the area that is now the Quad Cities)

Technical information
- Licensing authority: FCC
- Facility ID: 13950
- ERP: 33.7 kW
- HAAT: 409 m (1,342 ft)
- Transmitter coordinates: 41°32′48.8″N 90°28′37.7″W
- Translator(s): 19 (UHF) Rock Island; KGCW 26.4 Burlington, IA

Links
- Public license information: Public file; LMS
- Website: www.ourquadcities.com

WHBF-TV (channel 4) is a television station licensed to Rock Island, Illinois, United States, serving as the CBS affiliate for the Quad Cities area. It is owned by Nexstar Media Group alongside CW station KGCW (channel 26) and co-managed with Fox affiliate KLJB (channel 18); Nexstar's Tegna subsidiary owns ABC affiliate WQAD-TV (channel 8). WHBF-TV, KGCW and KLJB share studios in the Telco Building on 18th Street in downtown Rock Island; WHBF-TV's transmitter is located in Bettendorf, Iowa.

== History ==
=== Early history ===
WHBF-TV began broadcasting on July 1, 1950, making it the fifth-oldest television station in Illinois and the oldest outside Chicago. The station was originally owned by the Potter family, publishers of the Rock Island Argus, alongside WHBF radio (1270 AM, later WKBF, now defunct) and 98.9 FM (now WLKU).

WHBF-TV has served as a CBS affiliate since its launch, though it initially maintained secondary affiliations with ABC and the DuMont Television Network. Following DuMont's closure in 1956, the station shared ABC programming with WOC-TV (channel 6, now KWQC-TV), then the market's primary NBC affiliate, until WQAD-TV (channel 8) debuted as a dedicated ABC affiliate in 1963. WHBF-TV also briefly carried programming from the NTA Film Network in the late 1950s.

In 1986, the Potter family divested their media holdings. Citadel Communications acquired WHBF-TV, while the radio stations relocated from the Telco Building. Lynch Entertainment purchased a stake in the station the following year, forming Coronet Communications Company through a partnership between Citadel and Lynch.

WHBF-TV became the first station in the Quad Cities to utilize color radar and later introduced the ESP: Live (Exclusive Storm Prediction) weather system, which provides real-time severe weather alerts. On January 29, 2007, the station rebranded as "CBS 4" and adopted a circular logo design similar to those used by other Citadel-owned major network affiliates.

=== Nexstar ownership ===
On September 16, 2013, Citadel Communications announced the sale of WHBF-TV, WOI-DT in Des Moines, and KCAU-TV in Sioux City to the Irving, Texas–based Nexstar Broadcasting Group for $88 million. Nexstar assumed control of the stations immediately via a time brokerage agreement. The sale followed Citadel founder Phil Lombardo's decision to reduce his involvement and Lynch Entertainment's desire to divest its stakes in WHBF-TV and WOI.

Six weeks later, on November 6, Nexstar announced its acquisition of Grant Broadcasting's stations—including Fox affiliate KLJB (channel 18) and CW affiliate KGCW (channel 26)—for $87.5 million. Nexstar directly purchased KGCW, as Federal Communications Commission (FCC) regulations permitted duopolies in the Davenport–Moline–Rock Island market due to its eight independent full-power station owners. However, to comply with prohibitions on owning multiple top-four-rated stations, Nexstar transferred KLJB to Pluria Marshall Jr.'s minority-owned Marshall Broadcasting Group while maintaining operational control through a shared services agreement (SSA). This created a virtual triopoly with WHBF and KGCW. The WHBF-TV sale closed on March 13, 2014.

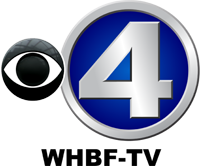
Former WHBF-TV logo, used from 2007 to 2015.

On January 27, 2016, Nexstar agreed to purchase Media General—owner of NBC affiliate KWQC-TV since 2013—for $4.6 billion. The deal required Nexstar to divest either WHBF-TV (and its SSA with KLJB) or KWQC to comply with FCC "top-four" duopoly rules. KGCW could remain under Nexstar's ownership, as it fell outside the market's top-four ratings threshold.

On June 3, 2016, Nexstar opted to retain WHBF-TV and Green Bay CBS affiliate WFRV-TV, while Media General sold KWQC and ABC affiliate WBAY-TV to Gray Television for $270 million. The FCC approved the transaction on January 11, 2017, finalizing the sale on January 17. Nexstar subsequently rebranded as Nexstar Media Group, incorporating its retained stations and former Media General properties.

On December 3, 2018, Nexstar announced its acquisition of Tribune Media—owner of ABC affiliate WQAD-TV since 2013—for $6.4 billion. FCC rules barred Nexstar from owning WQAD alongside WHBF-TV and KLJB, as the Quad Cities market prohibits ownership of more than two stations or multiple top-four-rated outlets. To resolve the conflict, Nexstar was required to sell either WQAD or both WHBF-TV and KLJB. KGCW could remain with Nexstar or be sold separately, as it did not rank among the market's top-four stations.

On March 20, 2019, Nexstar confirmed it would retain WHBF-TV, KGCW, and its KLJB SSA, while selling WQAD to Tegna Inc. for $1.32 billion as part of a broader divestiture of 19 stations to Tegna and E. W. Scripps Company. The sale marked Tegna's first Iowa television property and its return to Illinois since selling Rockford's WREX in 1969. The FCC approved the transaction on September 16, 2019, and it concluded on September 19.

In August 2025, Nexstar agreed to acquire Tegna for $6.2 billion. The deal was completed on March 19, 2026, and included approval for Nexstar to own three full-power station licenses in markets such as the Quad Cities. A temporary restraining order issued one week later by the U.S. District Court for the Eastern District of California, later escalated to a preliminary injunction, has prevented WQAD from being integrated into WHBF/KGCW/KLJB.

== Subchannel history ==
On January 16, 2012, WHBF-TV and other Citadel-owned stations launched an affiliation with the Live Well Network on digital subchannel 2 (DT2). From December 1, 2008, to January 15, 2012, DT2 carried the Retro Television Network (RTN), replacing a standard-definition simulcast of the station's main feed.

Between March 5, 2011, and January 15, 2012, WHBF-TV's RTN programming faced local competition after WQAD-TV (channel 8) converted its DT2 subchannel from the "Quad Cities Weather Channel" to an affiliate of Antenna TV.

== Programming ==
=== Past preemptions ===
From 1982 to 2011, WHBF-TV preempted CBS's overnight news programs, including CBS News Nightwatch and its successor CBS News Up to the Minute. Like other Citadel Communications-owned stations, WHBF-TV signed off nightly during this period, making it one of the last U.S. stations to maintain this practice. By the mid-2000s, the station ceased full overnight sign-offs and instead aired a test pattern with superimposed station identification. WHBF-TV's second digital subchannel transitioned to 24/7 broadcasting on December 1, 2008, with the launch of the Retro Television Network. The main channel began airing Up to the Minute in October 2011, ending its overnight sign-offs. This program was replaced by CBS Overnight News on September 21, 2015. Following these changes, Iowa Public Television's KQIN became the last station in the Quad Cities market to sign off overnight.

=== News operation ===
==== Historical programming ====
From 1950 to 2011, WHBF-TV did not air a weekday morning newscast, unlike most CBS affiliates. Instead, the station broadcast weather forecasts during the CBS Morning News, CBS This Morning, and The Early Show between 6 and 9 a.m. Initially, these slots included local news updates, which were later replaced by repeated weather segments. WHBF also aired CBS Morning News at 6 a.m., followed by a replay at 6:30 a.m., and did not carry a midday newscast.

==== Awards and notable coverage ====
WHBF-TV gained acclaim for its weekly documentary series Robb's Life (April 1995–April 1996), which chronicled Rock Island resident Robb Dussliere's battle with AIDS. Produced by news director Ken Gullette, the series featured no on-camera narration, relying instead on interviews, natural sound, and music to document Dussliere's life from diagnosis to his 1996 funeral. The series won awards from the Illinois and Iowa Associated Press, raised AIDS awareness, and shifted public perceptions. Most episodes are archived on YouTube, and a 2011 Dispatch/Argus retrospective highlighted its lasting impact, including interviews with Dussliere's parents.

==== HD transition and expansion ====
On December 21, 2010, WHBF-TV became the second Quad Cities station (after KWQC-TV) to broadcast local newscasts in high definition, starting with its 5 p.m. newscast. In September 2011, the station launched CBS4 News This Morning (later renamed Local 4 News This Morning), airing from 5:30 to 7 a.m. The 6 p.m. newscast also resumed after a 14-year hiatus. By spring 2012, the morning show expanded to 5–7 a.m., displacing paid religious programming.

==== Rebranding and schedule changes ====
On March 4, 2015, WHBF-TV introduced a new set, graphics, and the Local 4 branding (mirroring sister stations WKRC in Cincinnati and WOI in Des Moines), replacing its CBS 4 identity.

A 4 p.m. newscast, Local 4 News at 4, debuted on September 14, 2015, competing directly with KWQC-TV's established 4 p.m. broadcast. On December 31, 2015, WHBF began producing a nightly 9 p.m. newscast for Fox affiliate KLJB, followed by a weekday 7–9 a.m. morning show for the station in September 2017.

==== Ratings ====
WHBF-TV ranked second in Quad Cities news viewership behind WOC-TV (now KWQC-TV) until the mid-1970s, when it briefly surged to first place. By 1980, it fell to second again before dropping to third behind WQAD-TV in the late 1980s. Ratings improved following the 2015 rebranding to Local 4, though the station remained third in the market.

== Technical information ==
=== Subchannels ===
The station's signal is multiplexed:

Subchannels of WHBF-TV
Subchannel	Res.	Short name	Programming
4.1	1080i	WHBF-DT	CBS
4.2	480i	CourtTV	Court TV
4.3	480i	Grit	Grit
4.4	480i	Mystery	Ion Mystery
26.2	480i	Rewind	Rewind TV (KGCW)
26.3	480i	Laff	Laff (KGCW)

Broadcast on behalf of another station

=== Translator ===
- WHBF-TV (DRT) 19 Rock Island

=== Analog-to-digital conversion ===
WHBF-TV ended regular programming on its analog signal, over VHF channel 4, on June 12, 2009, at 6:01 a.m., coinciding with the federally mandated transition date for full-power U.S. television stations to digital broadcasting. The station's digital signal moved from UHF channel 58 (part of the high-band UHF spectrum [channels 52–69] phased out post-transition) to its former analog VHF channel 4. WHBF-TV became one of the few U.S. stations broadcasting digitally on a low VHF channel, alongside former sister station WOI-DT in Des Moines, NBC affiliate WMC-TV in Memphis, and ABC-owned WPVI-TV in Philadelphia.

From December 1, 2008, until January 15, 2012, WHBF-TV's second digital subchannel (4.2) aired the Retro Television Network. On January 16, 2012, WHBF-TV and its Citadel-owned sister stations replaced RTN with the Live Well Network, broadcasting it in a 16:9 letterbox format at 480i resolution (scaled from Live Well's 720p feed). Nexstar Broadcasting Group discontinued the subchannel entirely on January 16, 2014, prior to assuming control of WHBF-TV, leaving the station without a subchannel for 16 months.

Following Nexstar's 2014 acquisition of WHBF-TV and pending sale of KLJB to Marshall Broadcasting Group, speculation arose about relocating CW affiliate KGCW to a WHBF subchannel. On May 14, 2015, Nexstar relaunched 4.2 as a standard-definition simulcast of KGCW, transferring the feed from KLJB's 18.2 subchannel due to KLJB's separate ownership under Marshall Broadcasting.

=== Post-transition digital signal issues ===
Following its transition to digital broadcasting on low-VHF channel 4 on June 12, 2009, WHBF-TV faced significant reception issues, generating numerous viewer complaints within its first two months. In response, owner Citadel Communications sought regulatory approval to address the problems. The station applied for a UHF digital fill-in translator on channel 47 and petitioned to increase the effective radiated power (ERP) of its main VHF channel 4 signal from 24.1 kW to 33.7 kW.

==== Resolution ====
By September 8, 2009, WHBF-TV upgraded its VHF channel 4 signal to 33.7 kW ERP. On October 22, 2009, it activated the UHF channel 47 fill-in translator, broadcasting at 2,300 watts ERP from its Rock Island–based tower at the Telco Building studios.

Similar challenges affected other Citadel-owned stations that reverted to VHF channels post-transition, including KCAU-TV (Sioux City), WOI-DT (Des Moines), and KLKN (Lincoln, Nebraska), all of which deployed UHF translators to mitigate reception issues.
