= WAWV-TV =

Television station in Terre Haute, Indiana

- Terre Haute, Indiana; United States
- Channels: Digital: 18 (UHF); Virtual: 38
- Branding: WAWV

Programming
- Affiliations: 38.1: ABC; for others, see § Subchannels

Ownership
- Owner: Mission Broadcasting, Inc.
- Operator: Nexstar Media Group
- Sister stations: WTWO

History
- First air date: April 3, 1973
- Former call signs: WIIL-TV (1973–1977); WBAK-TV (1977–2005); WFXW (2005–2011)
- Former channel numbers: Analog: 38 (UHF, 1973–2009); Digital: 39 (UHF, 1999–2019)
- Former affiliations: ABC (1973–1995); Fox (1995–2011)
- Call sign meaning: ABC for the Wabash Valley

Technical information
- Licensing authority: FCC
- Facility ID: 65247
- ERP: 250 kW
- HAAT: 248 m (814 ft)
- Transmitter coordinates: 39°14′33″N 87°23′29″W

Links
- Public license information: Public file; LMS
- Website: www.mywabashvalley.com

WAWV-TV (channel 38) is a television station in Terre Haute, Indiana, United States, affiliated with ABC. It is owned by Mission Broadcasting and operated by Nexstar Media Group alongside dual NBC/CW affiliate WTWO (channel 2). The two stations share studios and transmitter facilities on US 41/150 in unincorporated Sullivan County (south of Farmersburg).

== History ==
=== First tenure with ABC ===
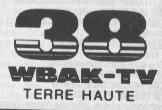
WBAK logo, used from 1985 to 1995.

The station first signed on the air on April 3, 1973, as WIIL-TV. Originally assigned to broadcast on UHF channel 66, the station eventually gained permission to broadcast on the stronger channel 38 to get wider signal coverage at less cost. It originally operated as an ABC affiliate. Previously, ABC had been relegated to off-hour clearances on CBS affiliate WTHI-TV (channel 10) and WTWO.

The station was founded by Alpha Broadcasting, which heavily invested in the new operation. However, the local market situation immediately sent the station into the red. Like many ABC affiliates that signed on during this time in medium-to-small markets, WIIL was hampered by ABC's marginal ratings; the network would not be on par with CBS and NBC in terms of affiliates and ratings until later in the decade. Additionally, viewers had strongly entrenched viewing habits with longer-established VHF stations WTWO and WTHI—although WTWO was less than a decade old. It did not help matters that most of the southern half of the market was able to receive ABC programming from WTVW in Evansville. Indiana's mostly flat terrain allowed WTVW's signal to penetrate further than would have been the case in hilly or mountainous terrain.

At one point in 1974, WIIL-TV nearly ceased operations; however, it managed to survive. At the end of 1976, Alpha sold the station to Charlotte, North Carolina–based broadcaster Cy Bahakel; the station changed its call letters to WBAK-TV (taken from Bahakel's last name) on March 29, 1977. Faith to Live By, a short daily devotional program that previously aired on WTWO, began airing each weekday morning immediately after WBAK signed on the air for the day. Despite stronger ownership, WBAK barely registered as a blip in the ratings in the market.

Channel 38's situation grew even more dire when Indianapolis's longtime NBC affiliate, WRTV, switched to ABC in June 1979. WRTV's former analog signal, due to its position on VHF channel 6, covered most of the Indiana side of the market, including most of Terre Haute itself. Like WTVW, WRTV's signal penetrated further into Terre Haute than would have been the case in more rugged terrain. When cable television franchises arrived in the Terre Haute market in the late 1970s, most cable systems piped in either WRTV, WTVW or WAND out of Decatur, Illinois in addition to WBAK.

=== As a Fox affiliate ===
The station switched its affiliation to Fox on January 31, 1995, and changed its branding to "Fox 38", citing low ratings from the then-glut of (stronger-rated) ABC affiliates from outlying markets, along with its newly acquired NFL rights. The network switch gave the market its first-ever Fox affiliate. The network had previously only been available in the market on area cable providers via either the now-defunct Foxnet cable feed (on the Illinois side) or Indianapolis affiliate WXIN (on the Indiana side). With only three commercial stations, Terre Haute did not have enough television stations to support full-time affiliations from four networks, and now featuring football, Fox did not want to relegate its programming to secondary clearances on the three existing outlets.

This issue aided in the side effect of leaving the Terre Haute area without an over-the-air ABC affiliate, leaving viewers with only fringe access from stations in Indianapolis, Evansville and Decatur. These outlying ABC affiliates also went through changes: in December 1995, WTVW also switched to Fox, leaving many viewers in the southern half of the market without ABC programming. While WTVW's signal decently covered the southern half of the market, new Evansville ABC affiliate WEHT suffered from a weaker signal on the UHF band. In 2005, WAND switched to NBC, with the ABC affiliation moving to Champaign's WICD, which replaced WAND on cable systems in the Illinois part of the Terre Haute market. Over-the-air viewers actually benefited from this particular switch. WAND's tower is located near the geographic center of Illinois, and most viewers living within the western part of the Terre Haute market in Illinois could only get a clear signal through cable. In contrast, WICD's tower is located near the Illinois–Indiana border and provides a stronger signal. Channel 38 and present-day sister station WTVW were two of three original ABC affiliates in Indiana to have switched to Fox, the other being WSJV in South Bend.

On the surface, the switch to Fox could have hamstrung WBAK, as it had to purchase an additional 16 hours of programming per day. Fox had only expanded its prime time schedule to seven nights a week two years earlier, but did not produce any daytime programming (outside of the network's children's block Fox Kids, which already aired Monday through Saturdays before the expansion of prime time programming). However, the switch, and the rise of Fox Sports, rejuvenated the station. Within a few years, WBAK became one of the strongest small-market Fox affiliates in the United States.

Bahakel Communications sold WBAK to Mission Broadcasting in 2003, which then entered into a joint sales agreement with Nexstar Broadcasting Group. The station integrated its operations with WTWO at that station's facility near Farmersburg. The station's call letters were changed to WFXW (for Fox Wabash Valley) on June 1, 2005. On April 16, 2008, a transmission line failure at WFXW's analog transmitter facility that occurred approximately ten minutes into Fox's telecast of American Idol's results show left the station off the air for 3 1/2 weeks; the station's analog signal remained dark until May 9. However, its digital signal was fed to area cable system headends and to Dish Network to restore service. The American Idol performance and result shows during the week of April 21 aired on sister station WTWO.

=== Return to ABC ===
On June 28, 2011, Nexstar signed a long-term deal with ABC to renew the affiliations of the company's existing affiliate in nine other markets; the deal also included an affiliation agreement with WFXW, which would disaffiliate from Fox and rejoin ABC beginning September 1, in a reversal of its 1995 affiliation switch. Nexstar also announced that channel 38 would change its call letters to WAWV-TV (standing for "ABC for the Wabash Valley") at that time. The move came after sister stations WTVW in Evansville, WFFT-TV in Fort Wayne and KSFX-TV (now KOZL-TV) in Springfield, Missouri, were stripped of their Fox affiliations following a dispute involving Nexstar and the network over a planned payment increase of its affiliates' retransmission consent fees to Fox.

Former logo from 2013 to 2025.

On August 25, 2011, LIN Media signed an agreement with Fox to move its programming to WTHI's second digital subchannel, which would also add sister programming service MyNetworkTV as a secondary affiliation. This made Terre Haute one of the only U.S. television markets where all three historical commercial broadcast networks (ABC, CBS and NBC) maintained primary affiliations, the Fox and MyNetworkTV affiliations were relegated to a digital subchannel, and The CW lacked an over-the-air affiliate. All Fox programming moved to WTHI-DT2 the following day. The rebranded station also adopted the brand "WAWV ABC", removing all references to its channel 38 allocation, along with a new logo.

Nexstar announced that it would acquire Media General, owners of rival WTHI-TV on January 27, 2016. Despite WTHI's higher ratings, on March 4, 2016, Nexstar and Mission declared their intentions to keep WTWO/WAWV and sell WTHI to another company; four months later; on June 13, 2016, it announced that WTHI and four other stations would be acquired by Heartland Media, through its USA Television MidAmerica Holdings joint venture with MSouth Equity Partners, for $115 million, to comply with Federal Communications Commission (FCC) ownership caps.

== News operation ==
WTWO presently produces 7 1/2 hours of locally produced newscasts each week for WAWV-TV (with 1 1/2 hours each weekday); unlike most ABC affiliates in the Eastern Time Zone, the station does not broadcast any local newscasts in the morning, 6 and 11 p.m. timeslots nor does it air newscasts on Saturdays or Sundays.

When channel 38 signed on as WIIL-TV in 1973, the station produced a half-hour newscast at 6:30 p.m. weeknights, titled the WIIL-TV Evening News. Due to low advertising and budget cuts, the news operation was shut down in 1974; however, the station continued to provide weather updates during the evening hours. News programming returned to the station in 1978, with a single daily broadcast each evening under the News 38 branding; at one point, the station's news staff was largely composed of former employees from WTHI-TV's news department. WBAK discontinued local news programming with the cancellation of its evening newscast in 1981; for the last fourteen years of its tenure as an ABC affiliate, the station only broadcast syndicated programs at both 6 and 11 p.m. However, the station would produce a weekday morning program titled Good Morning Terre Haute, which consisted of interviews and included a weather segment. The station also aired its own public affairs programming; one such program, Valley Point of View, ran until 2004 and was produced by the organization Leadership Terre Haute.

Upon the station's January 1995 switch to Fox, WBAK entered into a news share agreement with WTHI-TV to produce a half-hour prime time newscast at 10 p.m. for the station. The station's morning interview program continued for a short period under the new title Valley Focus on Fox 38, before being canceled in 1996 along with the devotional program Faith To Live By. WTHI terminated the news share agreement after WBAK-TV entered into the JSA with WTWO upon its acquisition by Mission Broadcasting, with the last WTHI-produced newscast airing on the station on December 31, 2003. The station ran syndicated programming at 10 p.m. for several months until WTWO began producing a half-hour prime time newscast in the summer of 2004, titled NewsChannel 2 Prime Edition, using the same anchors as channel 2's weeknight 6 and 11 p.m. newscasts. The 10 p.m. newscast was retitled Fox 38 News at 10 for a brief period beginning in June 2005, before being renamed again to WFXW Prime Edition. At that point, the broadcast began using its own news anchor, as well as a separate set, graphics and music package (the graphics were based on a package that was also used at the time by sister station WTVW, which was originally commissioned for Las Vegas Fox affiliate KVVU-TV). On June 7, 2007, when the title was amended to WTWO Prime Edition on WFXW, the newscast reverted to being produced from WTWO's main news set and used its evening anchors.

The newscast was retooled again as Fox 38 News: First at 10 on June 8, 2009, restoring the separate news set, graphics package (this time using one used by many Fox owned-and-operated stations and affiliates) and news music package ("Extreme" by Stephen Arnold Music). It was solo anchored by Leanne Tokars, who anchored the program from 2005 to 2007, before returning to the station in 2009; she left again later in 2010. WFXW also carried rebroadcasts of WTWO's weekday 6 a.m. and 6 p.m. newscasts, both airing on a one-hour delay. The 6 p.m. rebroadcast was dropped after a few months, leaving only the morning news rebroadcast at 7 a.m.

When the station rejoined ABC, WTWO moved its hour-long 5 p.m. newscast, Live at Five, to WAWV-TV. However, the 7 a.m. rebroadcast of WTWO's weekday morning newscast was dropped, as ABC airs Good Morning America in that timeslot (though WTWO does provide local news and weather updates during that program, along with half-hourly news and weather updates seen throughout the day, and a special agricultural-related forecast during AgDay on weekday mornings); the existing 10 p.m. newscast was removed from the station as well, as unlike Fox, ABC provides prime time network programming during that hour, though it transitioned into the online-only WAWV News First at Ten, a 15-minute program that was streamed on the website shared by WTWO/WAWV until it was discontinued on December 28, 2012; the station otherwise does not carry a newscast in the traditional 11 p.m. timeslot. On September 10, 2012, WAWV launched a half-hour midday newscast at noon on weekdays.

== Technical information ==
=== Subchannels ===
The station's digital signal is multiplexed:

Subchannels of WAWV-TV
| Subchannel | Res. | Short name | Programming |
|---|---|---|---|
| 38.1 | 720p | WAWV-HD | ABC |
| 38.2 | 480i | Grit | Grit |
| 38.3 | 480i | Bounce | Bounce TV |
| 38.4 | 480i | Rewind | Rewind TV |

On June 15, 2016, Nexstar announced that it had entered into an affiliation agreement with Katz Broadcasting for the Escape (now Ion Mystery), Laff, Grit, and Bounce TV networks (the last one of which was owned by Bounce Media LLC, whose COO Jonathan Katz was president/CEO of Katz Broadcasting), bringing the four networks to 81 stations owned and/or operated by Nexstar, including WAWV-TV and WTWO. Grit and Bounce TV were off the air from July 25, 2017, until May 15, 2018, due to transmitter problems. From July 25, 2017, to February 9, 2018, WAWV's main channel 38.1 aired on a temporary antenna on sister station WTWO on 36.2, while still displaying PSIP channel 38.1.

=== Analog-to-digital conversion ===
WAWV-TV (as WFXW) ended regular programming on its analog signal, over UHF channel 38, on June 12, 2009, the official date on which full-power television stations in the United States transitioned from analog to digital broadcasts under federal mandate. The station's digital signal remained on its pre-transition UHF channel 39, using virtual channel 38.
