= KMID =

Television station in Midland, Texas

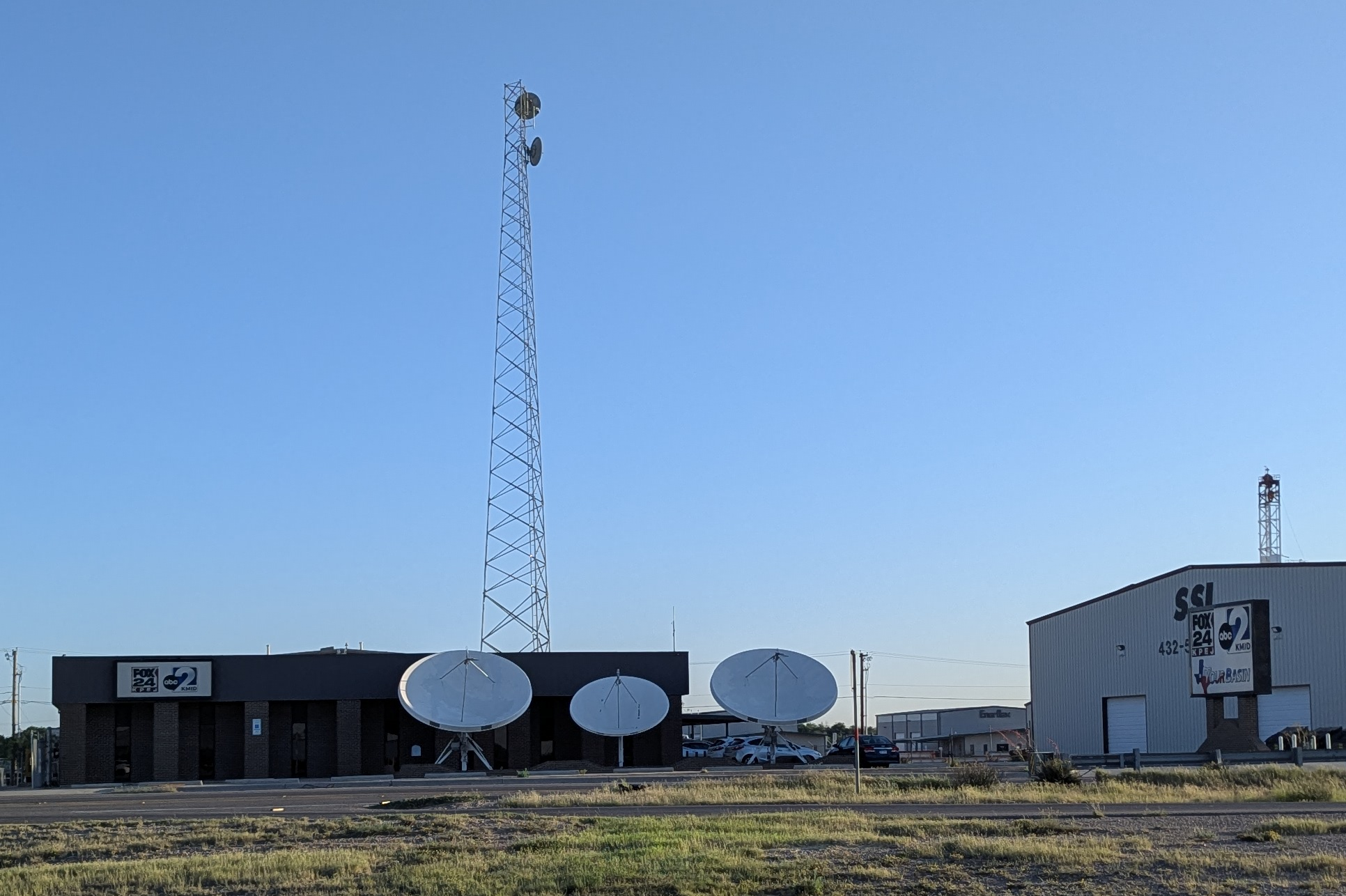
- KMID–KPEJ-TV studios in Odessa
- Midland–Odessa, Texas; United States
- City: Midland, Texas
- Channels: Digital: 26 (UHF); Virtual: 2
- Branding: ABC Big 2

Programming
- Affiliations: 2.1: ABC; for others, see § Subchannels

Ownership
- Owner: Nexstar Media Group; (Nexstar Media Inc.)
- Sister stations: KPEJ-TV; Tegna: KWES-TV

History
- First air date: December 20, 1953
- Former call signs: KMID-TV (1953–1992)
- Former channel numbers: Analog: 2 (VHF, 1953–2009)
- Former affiliations: NBC (1953–1982); DuMont (secondary, 1953–1955); CBS (secondary, 1953–1955); ABC (secondary, 1953–1958)
- Call sign meaning: Midland

Technical information
- Licensing authority: FCC
- Facility ID: 35131
- ERP: 1,000 kW
- HAAT: 275 m (902 ft)
- Transmitter coordinates: 32°5′51.4″N 102°17′22.5″W

Links
- Public license information: Public file; LMS
- Website: yourbasin.com

KMID (channel 2) is a television station licensed to Midland, Texas, United States, serving as the ABC affiliate for the Permian Basin area. It is owned by Nexstar Media Group and operated alongside Fox affiliate KPEJ-TV (channel 24); Nexstar's Tegna subsidiary owns NBC affiliate KWES-TV (channel 9). KMID and KPEJ-TV share studios on Windview Street (along I-20) in west Odessa; KMID's transmitter is located on FM 1788 in rural southeastern Andrews County.

KMID went on the air as the Permian Basin's first TV station on December 20, 1953. It was built by the Midessa Television Corporation, a consortium of Oklahoman businessmen, and had studios near Midland's airport. Though it was a primary affiliate of NBC, it aired the programs of other networks until 1958 as the market gained competing stations. In 1982, it exchanged affiliations with KTPX (channel 9, now KWES-TV) and became an ABC affiliate. Under the ownership of Telepictures in the mid-1980s, KMID moved from second to first in the local news ratings, but when channel 9 was sold and revitalized in the 1990s, it took first place from KMID. Nexstar acquired the station in 2000 and consolidated it with KPEJ-TV in 2015, moving KMID's studio to Odessa in the process.

== History ==
The Federal Communications Commission (FCC) initially awarded a construction permit for channel 2 in Midland to Permian Basin Television Company—headed by J. Howard Hodge, a movie theater owner—in February 1953. This group, unable to secure a commitment for network affiliation, surrendered the permit in early May, and a second group, the Midessa Television Corporation, filed for the channel later that month. It consisted of five men from Oklahoma, including Ransom H. Drewry, who already owned radio and TV stations in that state. The FCC awarded Midessa the channel 2 permit on July 1, 1953, and construction began in October, by which time the station had already obtained affiliation with NBC.

KMID-TV aired its first program on December 20, 1953—an outing shortened to 50 minutes by technical troubles—bringing television to the Permian Basin. The station aired programs from NBC plus ABC, CBS, and DuMont. Its original studios were near the Midland Air Terminal, and the transmitter was south of the city. In 1955, a microwave transmission system was set up from Midland to Roswell, New Mexico, utilizing two disused oil rigs as relay towers, enabling KMID-TV to telecast live network programs. DuMont ceased its existence as a network in 1955, while other local stations established in the Permian Basin took some of its programs. KOSA-TV (channel 7) went on the air from Odessa in January 1956 as a CBS affiliate, and channel 9 went on the air from Monahans as KVKM-TV, an ABC affiliate, in 1958. The station was the first to launch color broadcasts in the region on December 22, 1956. A new tower equidistant from Midland and Odessa was completed in 1960, and a new studio building at the Terminal was completed in 1963.

In 1982, ABC moved its affiliation to KMID-TV, with the NBC affiliation moving to channel 9—by this time established in Odessa as KTPX-TV. KMID manager Ray Herndon felt that ABC had stronger sports programming than NBC, which better fit the West Texas market. The next year, the station was acquired for $15 million by Telepictures, a TV program producer entering station ownership for the first time, as the first of what it intended to be a group of stations. After taking control in February 1984, Telepictures immediately made changes to bolster KMID's news department, which was in a distant second place to market-leading KOSA-TV. It hired away J. Gordon Lunn, a popular weatherman at KOSA, and invested in capital improvements. The changes came on the heels of KOSA losing five employees, including a popular anchor, in a plane crash. Within a year, from November 1984 to November 1985, KMID increased its 6 p.m. news audience by 15 percentage points and moved past KOSA.

Telepictures merged with Lorimar Television in 1985 to create Lorimar-Telepictures. In 1987, Lorimar-Telepictures effectuated a corporate restructuring. It sold KMID-TV and ownership in two other stations—KSPR in Springfield, Missouri, and a 19-percent interest in KCPM in Chico, California—to Goltrin Communications, headed by Joseph Goldfarb, the president of Lorimar's broadcasting division. In 1989, Marvin Davis, former owner of 20th Century Fox, acquired a stake in the company, which became known as Davis-Goldfarb.

During Davis-Goldfarb ownership, KMID faced a revitalized competitor as Drewry acquired KTPX-TV in 1991. Drewry drew on its connections at KMID as it started to rebuild the station. It lured general manager John Foster, a KMID employee of 32 years, to KTPX by offering him an equity position. By 1994, the renamed KWES-TV had displaced KMID from first place as channel 2 lost a third of its 6 p.m. news audience and nearly half of its 10 p.m. news audience between February 1993 and February 1994; when Drewry Communications founder Ransom H. Drewry died in January 1994, KWES personnel credited his ownership with revitalizing channel 9.

The Davis-Goldfarb stations were sold for $32.5 million to Cottonwood Communications Corporation in 1995. Cottonwood was the first foray of longtime broadcast manager Al Seethaler into station ownership. Cottonwood merged with GOCOM Communications in 1997; GOCOM merged with Grapevine Communications in 1999, with the combined company retaining the name GOCOM.

Shortly after the Grapevine–GOCOM merger was completed, Nexstar Broadcasting Group agreed to acquire KMID for $10 million and immediately took over station operations while the deal received FCC approval. Nexstar already owned multiple stations in Texas. By this time, KMID was a distant second or third place to KWES in evening news ratings, falling to a more distant third in the 2000s as KOSA moved from third to first in the market. Nexstar acquired Communications Corporation of America, owner of Odessa-based Fox affiliate KPEJ (channel 24), in 2013. As part of the transaction, it sold KPEJ and two other Fox stations to Marshall Broadcasting Group—a new, minority-controlled company headed by Pluria Marshall Jr.—for $58.5 million. While this company acquired much of the station's assets, Nexstar entered into a shared services agreement to provide non-programming resources (such as master control) and advertising sales for Marshall's three stations. After the sale was completed, KMID moved to the west side of Odessa.

Nexstar acquired KWES-TV owner Tegna in a deal announced in August 2025 and completed on March 19, 2026. A temporary restraining order issued one week later by the U.S. District Court for the Eastern District of California, later escalated to a preliminary injunction, has prevented KWES from being integrated into KMID and KPEJ.

== Notable former on-air staff ==
- Dayna Devon — reporter/anchor, 1995–1997
- Mike Emanuel — reporter

== Technical information ==
=== Subchannels ===
KMID's transmitter is located on FM 1788 in rural southeastern Andrews County. The station's signal is multiplexed:

Subchannels of KMID
Subchannel	Res.	Short name	Programming
2.1	720p	KMID-DT	ABC
2.2	480i	Laff	Laff
2.3	480i	Escape	Ion Mystery
2.4	480i	Grit	Grit

=== Analog-to-digital conversion ===
KMID shut down its analog signal, over VHF channel 2, on June 12, 2009, the official digital television transition date. The station's digital signal remained on its pre-transition UHF channel 26, using virtual channel 2.

== See also ==
- Channel 2 virtual TV stations in the United States
- Channel 26 digital TV stations in the United States
