= Milton Grant =

American disc jockey and TV station owner (1923–2007)

- Grant, c. 1980s
- Born: May 13, 1923; New York City, U.S.
- Died: April 28, 2007 (aged 83); Fort Lauderdale, Florida, U.S.
- Occupations: Disc jockey; television station owner
- Notable work: The Milt Grant Show (1956–1961)

Milton Grant (May 13, 1923 – April 28, 2007) was an American disc jockey and owner of television stations. Born in New York City, it was in Washington, D.C., where he made his mark as a disc jockey at radio stations WINX and WOL. Beginning in the early 1950s, he began appearing on Washington television station WTTG. From 1956 to 1961, he hosted the six-time-a-week The Milt Grant Show on WTTG; it was Washington's primary teen dance show on TV and made him a Washington icon of the period. When WTTG abruptly canceled the show in 1961, Grant continued to host programs on a "Teen Network" of four regional radio stations.

In the 1960s, Grant shifted from being an on-air personality to a behind-the-scenes figure. He organized the Capital Broadcasting Company, which built Washington independent WDCA. Grant owned the station until 1969 and continued as its general manager until January 1980, when he resigned to pursue applying for and building his own station in the city. That never occurred, but Grant aligned with Sidney Shlenker and other investors to launch two independent stations in Texas in the early 1980s: KTXA in Fort Worth and KTXH in Houston. These stations were where Grant perfected his launch strategy for new stations to come on "full-grown", freely spending on syndicated programming and promotion. They were sold to Gulf Broadcasting in 1984.

Grant then started a second station group, Grant Broadcasting System (GBS), which built WBFS-TV in Miami, launched WGBS-TV in Philadelphia, and relaunched WGBO-TV in Chicago. Grant used the same strategy in these markets, and while particularly the Miami and Philadelphia outlets saw success, the prices paid for syndicated shows and a flat advertising market left the company overextended. In December 1986, GBS filed for bankruptcy protection; Grant lost control of the stations, which were transferred to a group of GBS bondholders operating as Combined Broadcasting.

In 1990, Grant returned to broadcast station ownership with the purchase of bankrupt WZDX, a Fox affiliate serving Huntsville, Alabama. The new company—known variously as Grant Communications or Grant Broadcasting System II—later acquired stations in Virginia, New York, Iowa, and Wisconsin, broadcasting Fox, The CW, and MyNetworkTV. After Grant's death in 2007, his family sold the stations to Nexstar Broadcasting Group and affiliated companies in 2014.

== Early life ==
Grant was born on May 13, 1923, in New York City—a fact that was not well known during his life, as Grant was notoriously reticent to divulge it. He told Washington business publication Regardie's in an August 1988 cover story, "We're all so caught up in this age thing". After growing up in Plainfield, New Jersey, and studying economics and English at New York University and Columbia University, he first came to Washington after reportedly being recruited to the Office of Strategic Services during World War II, later telling stories of spying for the U.S. in north Africa and Italy.

After the war, Grant returned to Columbia to finish his degree. He spent time in Scranton, Pennsylvania, at WARM, where he served as a color commentator on sportscasts. He returned to Washington in 1947 as a summer replacement at WTOP, then joined the staff of WINX as a disc jockey in 1950. By 1953, he had moved to WOL, where he hosted The Milt Grant Record Show.

== The Milt Grant Show ==
Grant began appearing on television on March 7, 1954, when Washington station WTTG began airing a Sunday program known as Marion Showcase, which featured a movie, talent show, and dancing. In July 1956, Grant started a new program on the station: Milt Grant's Record Hop, which debuted on July 22, 1956, as a simulcast on WOL and WTTG. The program was supported by local police and civic organizations with the hope to be a "constructive approach" against juvenile delinquency. That October, WTTG extended a contract offer to Grant, which he accepted effective October 1; he then left WOL to become a full-time television broadcaster.

Live from a ballroom at the Raleigh Hotel, The Milt Grant Show became the city's highest-rated local program by 1958. High-profile stars of the day, such as Chuck Berry, Buddy Holly, Frankie Avalon, Nat King Cole, Bobby Darin, Ike & Tina Turner, Harry Belafonte, Bob Hope, Connie Francis, and Fabian were guests on the show during its run. In addition to hosting the show, Grant was also the producer and sold advertising for such brands as Pepsi, Motorola, and Briggs ice cream; the kids on the program often knew the sponsors well. Grant got half of all advertising revenues in the first contract, a share that diminished as revenues increased; at one point, his contract was renegotiated because he earned more than John Kluge, the CEO of WTTG parent Metropolitan Broadcasting. The dancers—among them future reporter Carl Bernstein—were mostly White; Black dancers were only allowed on Tuesdays, and they were not allowed to dance with White partners.

In addition, Grant ventured into the record business. He founded Punch Records in December 1958, and he was one of the few DJs not to be mentioned in connection with the late-1950s payola scandals in the U.S. Prior to founding Punch, Grant had already made a connection with music. At one of Grant's record hops, Link Wray improvised a song that impressed the audience so much that Grant paid for it to be recorded at a Washington studio. Grant got songwriting credit for "Rumble"; Wray told NPR's Fresh Air in 2005, "Milt Grant smelt a dollar". Punch also released the regional hit "The Bug" by Jerry Dallman and the Knightcaps—also with a songwriting credit from Grant, though he only bought into the song—which was later featured in the soundtrack to the 1988 film Hairspray.

WTTG opted to cancel The Milt Grant Show after its April 15, 1961, edition. The move disappointed Grant, baffled media experts, and led high schoolers to picket The Washington Post, hoping to draw attention to their cause. With his cancellation from television, Grant began airing two weekend afternoon shows over Washington stations WPGC, WAVA, WINX, and WEEL, forming the "teen network". Shows originated live from such local haunts as recreation halls and amusement parks. However, he expressed continued fondness for the time he spent hosting The Milt Grant Show. In 1990, when he returned to Washington for a National Archives screening of the only surviving footage of the program, he told the assembled crowd, "It was a very important time of my life. We were part of the great new beginning of television and there was just so much energy. It made me fall in love with television and all its powers." Grant would later note the importance of his disc jockey years in his career as a television station owner: "I learned about the audiences and how to influence them so they respond to what you ask them to do."

== WDCA-TV ==
I went around the country studying UHF, and no one had really made it work yet. But I was just so strongly committed to building my own television station that I thought that if I could just get it on the air I would know how to program it and promote it so it would work.

— Grant, on moving into TV station ownership with WDCA-TV

A company headed by Grant, Capital Broadcasting Company, applied in November 1962 to build ultra high frequency (UHF) channel 20 in Washington. The permit was awarded the next year, and WDCA-TV began broadcasting on April 20, 1966, emphasizing sports programming. With his pivot from talent to management, Grant stopped going by "Milt" and instead preferred "Milton". Grant sold the station to Superior Tube Company, a Pennsylvania-based manufacturer of metal tubing products, in 1969, but he remained station president and general manager. In a 1986 interview, Grant would admit that he "went to school" managing WDCA-TV, which—as a UHF station competing in a four-VHF market—was at a disadvantage. He told Broadcasting magazine, "No one had ever heard of UHF."

During Grant's management tenure at channel 20, the station cemented itself as the second independent in Washington, behind WTTG, with a counterprogramming approach to program scheduling. Local programs ranged from monkey races during afternoon cartoons to late-night horror movies and coverage of the Washington Bullets basketball and Washington Capitals hockey teams.

== Grant–Shlenker partnership ==
Superior Tube sold WDCA-TV to Taft Broadcasting for $15.5 million in 1979. Shortly after, Grant left channel 20 and applied for Washington's then-vacant channel 14. One reason he left was because his work habits—a late start and finish—clashed with the corporate culture of Taft.

While that application was adjudicated, Grant joined a consortium led by Sidney Shlenker that was building two new independent stations in Texas. On January 4, 1981, KTXA began broadcasting to the Dallas–Fort Worth metroplex. It aired a mix of subscription television programs from ON TV and conventionally available independent shows. November 1982 brought KTXH in Houston, which was a full-time commercial independent.

Inside a year, he took a station that didn't exist before and made millions of dollars for his people. You could say he's a programming genius.

— Ann Hodges, television columnist for the Houston Chronicle, on Grant's work at KTXH

At the Texas stations, Grant iterated a strategy that would initially be successful. KTXA had been the second of three new stations in six months in the Dallas–Fort Worth market, all of them hybrid commercial/subscription stations. In contrast to the other two hybrid startups that "merely appeared", Ed Bark of The Dallas Morning News wrote that KTXA had "burst into living rooms like a world-champion encyclopedia salesman", with nearly ubiquitous billboards, high-profile programming, and an emphasis on weekend movies. Grant declared the first month of KTXH—similarly fueled by high-profile programming and a plan to spend $250,000 on advertising in just two months—a success, fulfilling his goal of signing on a "full-grown TV station". KTXH also benefited from its other owners, which included Shlenker—owner of the Houston Rockets basketball team—and the Houston Sports Association, owner of the Houston Astros. Both teams were broadcast on the new station.

The pairing of KTXA and KTXH had proven to be successful and highly lucrative. Grant's aggressive programming and promotions strategy, plus a favorable climate for independent stations nationally, made the two stations highly profitable and attracted major bidders. Outlet Communications, the broadcasting division of The Outlet Company of Rhode Island, was one of several parties negotiating to buy KTXA and KTXH. However, negotiations fell through, and Grant instead sold the pair to the Gulf Broadcast Group for $158 million in May 1984. The sale was held up for several months at the FCC, which conditioned the purchase on Gulf divesting FM stations in both cities. The sale price was considered unprecedented given the short period of operation of the stations.

== Grant Broadcasting System ==
After selling the Texas stations, Grant started a new company, known as the Grant Broadcasting System (GBS), and developed three new independent stations. The first to go on air was also the most successful: WBFS-TV (channel 33) in Miami, which began broadcasting in December 1984. An estimated $2 million in advertising over the station's first 60 days supported the launch of the new station, which secured the rights to Miami Hurricanes men's basketball. By March 1986, WBFS had tied WCIX as the top independent station in South Florida. However, other Miami stations, having already seen the Grant strategy at work in Dallas and Houston, also made aggressive program and advertising purchases, slightly blunting the impact of the full-grown approach.

In 1985, Grant bought two additional stations which were relaunched. The first to emerge was WGBS-TV "Philly 57" in Philadelphia, which went on the air that October. It was the conversion of the former WWSG-TV, an all-subscription station with an underpowered transmission facility. The station was anchored by two major sports attractions—Villanova Wildcats men's basketball and Philadelphia Flyers hockey—and made expensive syndicated program purchases. One reason the market was able to absorb WGBS-TV was that the previous third independent in the market, WKBS-TV, had been liquidated two years prior.

Toward the end of the year, Grant acquired WFBN in Joliet, Illinois, a suburb of Chicago, which relaunched as WGBO-TV at the start of 1986. The crowded Chicago independent market greeted the relaunched "Super 66" with defensive increases in their own promotional budgets. A fourth independent station launch, KGBS in Salt Lake City, Utah, was planned for 1987.

Grant kept up the development of these stations despite his unusual work habits. He rarely came into his office before noon and was known to hold business meetings well past midnight, a practice he attributed to reducing the amount of telephone interruptions he received. Grant served as the general manager of all three GBS stations.

=== Bankruptcy ===
However, Grant's tactics and particularly the upward pressure he placed on syndicated program prices would turn out to be his downfall. As the advertising market went flat while prices remained high, a problem that had already claimed several independent stations in late 1985 and early 1986, the stations became unable to pay their bills to syndicators. On December 8, 1986, GBS filed for federal bankruptcy protection in Philadelphia, seeking to avoid its creditors forcing it into involuntary bankruptcy. In 1986, GBS lost $35.96 million: WBFS-TV in Miami lost $6.54 million, WGBS-TV in Philadelphia lost $9.72 million, and Chicago's WGBO-TV lost $13.76 million. The flat market, higher programming costs, and defensive maneuvers by competing broadcasters had prevented Grant from achieving the same success he had with the strategy in the Texas markets. The Chicago station's difficulties were deeper, so much so that media analyst Paul Kagan speculated that if the stations had been differently structured, only WGBO-TV might have filed for bankruptcy.

We became caught in a buzz saw of rising prices. The other stations became defensive because they saw what we accomplished in Houston and Dallas. Prices went up, and we ran into a squeeze.

— Grant, on what befell GBS

In March 1987, GBS was allowed to continue operating its stations until at least July 1 through cash and accounts receivables to fund operations, denying a motion by the company's creditors to assume control of the stations or force their sale. However, on July 7, Grant agreed to enter into receivership and turn over control of the company and its three stations to its television program suppliers and bondholders under a reorganization plan—approved on March 30, 1988—to repay $420 million in debt from the stations' operations by 1995, at which point the stations would be sold off. In July 1988, Combined Broadcasting, a creditor-controlled company, took over GBS and the three stations.

Grant, in a May 1988 interview with Electronic Media magazine, analyzed the downfall of GBS. He told Diane Mermigas that, given the changes in market revenue and competitors' understanding of what happened with the Texas stations, "I should have been more cautious in our program buying" and cited a lack of time and backup revenue to make up for shortfalls. In other interviews, he cited defensive actions by other stations in the GBS markets, escalating programming costs, and purchasing too much programming. After being forced out of GBS, Grant continued to own 25 percent of KLRT-TV in Little Rock, Arkansas, in which he had previously received an option to buy a minority stake as a result of a settlement for the channel, and provide consulting services to the winner of channel 14 in Washington. GBS and TVX Broadcast Group—with the stations Grant built in Washington, Fort Worth, and Houston in its portfolio—were cited by Television Engineering editor Peter Caranicas and Variety writer John Lippman as among the highest-profile economic failures in late 1980s independent television, with Kagan telling The New York Times in 1988 that GBS's failure burst the independent stations bubble.

== Grant Communications: Rebuilding ==
After losing GBS, Grant expressed a desire to return to the stations marketplace, and by May 1988, a new company, Grant Communications, had been set up to own broadcast stations. He sought "properties that are underdeveloped or undermanaged—primarily independents, but not necessarily UHFs—who have opportunities for good growth and profitability". More than a year later, Grant partnered with Citicorp to purchase WZDX, the Fox affiliate in Huntsville, Alabama, out of bankruptcy, marking his return to station ownership. The next year, Grant agreed to purchase a second Fox affiliate that had only recently emerged from its own bankruptcy: KLJB-TV in Davenport, Iowa. A third was added in 1993 when Grant acquired WJPR–WVFT, a simulcasting Fox affiliate for Lynchburg and Roanoke, Virginia.

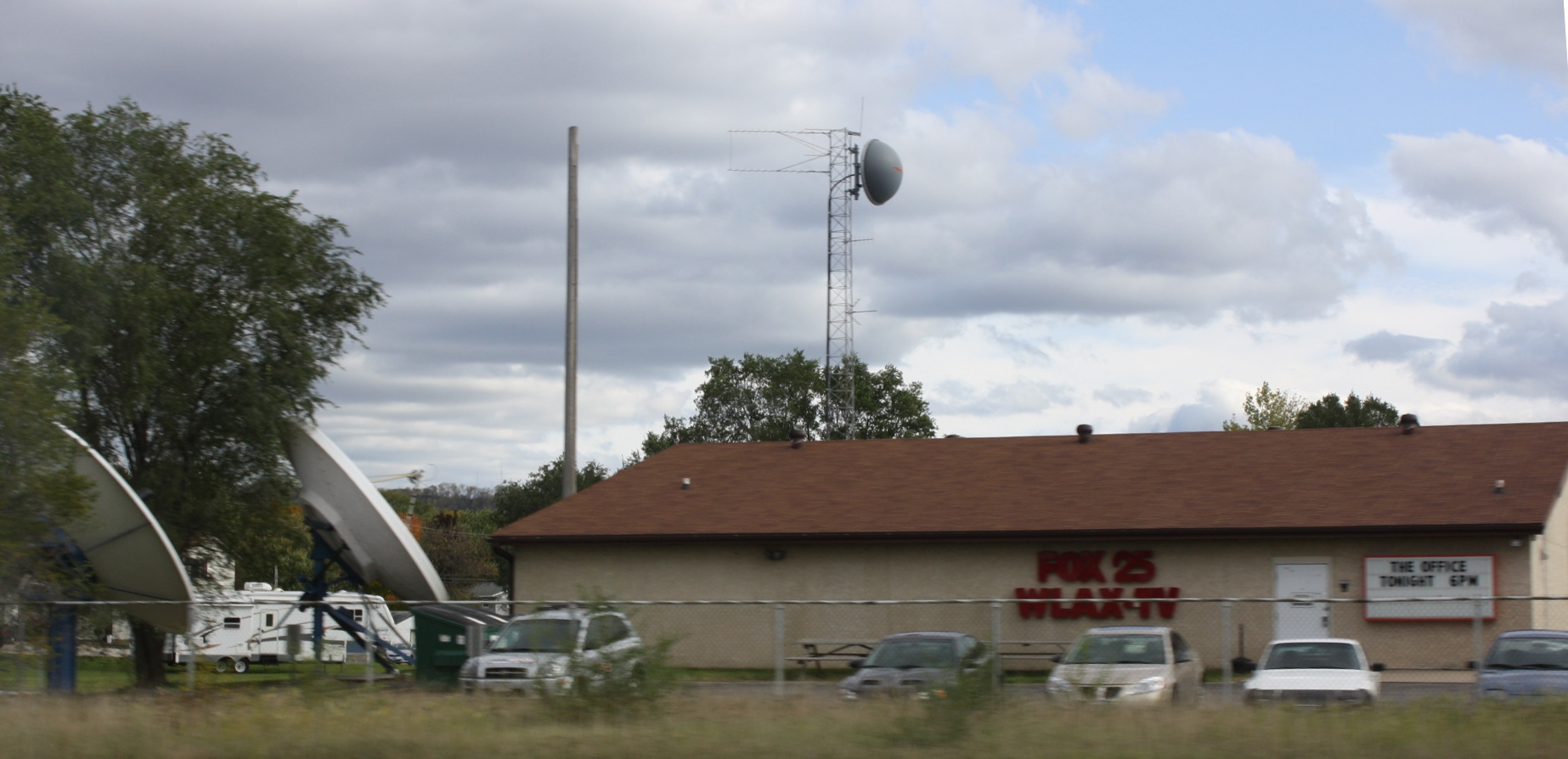
The WLAX studios in La Crosse, Wisconsin

Grant made three additional acquisitions in 1996. Two were inactive stations. In Burlington, Iowa, south of Davenport, KJMH had closed after losing its Fox affiliation in 1994; it was purchased by Grant in 1995 and returned to air in March 1996 as a simulcaster of KLJB-TV. Grant acquired the dormant WTJA in Jamestown, New York, which had last broadcast in 1991; he then traded it and $12 million to Tri-State Christian Television to acquire channel 49 in Buffalo, which returned to the air as The WB affiliate WNYO-TV in October 1996. The third was WLAX–WEUX, the Fox affiliate for La Crosse and Eau Claire, Wisconsin.

Grant parlayed his relationship with The WB, formed after the relaunch of the Buffalo station, into secondary WB affiliations for the Davenport, Roanoke–Lynchburg, and Huntsville stations in 1999, when the network ceased distributing its programming nationally via Superstation WGN. Full secondary services with The WB programming—cable channels in Roanoke and Huntsville and a relaunched KJMH for the Quad Cities market—were rolled out in 2001. Meanwhile, Grant sold WNYO-TV to Sinclair Broadcast Group for $51.5 million.

=== Death and sale of stations ===
Milton Grant died in Fort Lauderdale, Florida, on April 28, 2007; he had reportedly been suffering from cancer, though The Post could not obtain a confirmation of his death from his privately held company. He was survived by three children and four grandchildren; his son, Thomas Grant II, became the company's vice president, and corporate programming director Drew Pfeiffer was elevated to CEO.

On November 6, 2013, Nexstar Broadcasting Group announced its intent to purchase the Grant stations for $87.5 million. Due to FCC ownership regulations, one of the stations—KLJB—was spun off to Marshall Broadcasting Group, with Nexstar handling much of its operations through a shared services agreement. The sale was completed on December 1, 2014.

== Stations owned by Milton Grant ==
Stations are arranged alphabetically by state and by city of license.

Stations owned by Milton Grant
Ownership group	City	State	Station	Channel	Years owned	Ref(s)
Capital Broadcasting Company	Washington	District of Columbia	WDCA	20	1966–1969	
Investors including Sidney Shlenker	Fort Worth–Dallas	Texas	KTXA	21	1981–1984	
Investors including Sidney Shlenker	Houston	Texas	KTXH	20	1982–1984	
Grant Broadcasting Co. of Little Rock	Little Rock	Arkansas	KLRT-TV (Note: Grant owned a 25 percent ownership interest in this station.)	16	1983–1991	
Grant Broadcasting System	Miami	Florida	WBFS-TV	33	1984–1988	
Grant Broadcasting System	Joliet–Chicago	Illinois	WGBO-TV	66	1985–1988	
Grant Broadcasting System	Philadelphia	Pennsylvania	WGBS-TV	57	1985–1988	
Grant Communications (Grant Broadcasting System II)	Huntsville	Alabama	WZDX	54	1990–2014	
Grant Communications (Grant Broadcasting System II)	Burlington	Iowa	KGCW	26	1995–2014	
Grant Communications (Grant Broadcasting System II)	Davenport	Iowa	KLJB	18	1991–2014	
Grant Communications (Grant Broadcasting System II)	Buffalo	New York	WNYO-TV	49	1996–2001	
Grant Communications (Grant Broadcasting System II)	Roanoke	Virginia	WFXR	27	1993–2014	
Grant Communications (Grant Broadcasting System II)	Lynchburg	Virginia	WWCW	21	1993–2014	
Grant Communications (Grant Broadcasting System II)	La Crosse	Wisconsin	WLAX	25	1996–2014	
Grant Communications (Grant Broadcasting System II)	Eau Claire	Wisconsin	WEUX (Note: Satellite of WLAX.)	48	1996–2014	
