= KLJB =

Television station in Davenport, Iowa

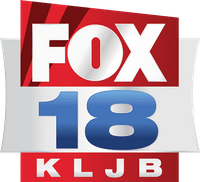
- Davenport–Bettendorf, Iowa; Moline–Rock Island, Illinois; United States
- City: Davenport, Iowa
- Channels: Digital: 30 (UHF); Virtual: 18
- Branding: Fox 18

Programming
- Affiliations: 18.1: Fox; for others, see § Subchannels

Ownership
- Owner: Mission Broadcasting, Inc.
- Operator: Nexstar Media Group
- Sister stations: KGCW, WHBF-TV; Tegna: WQAD-TV

History
- First air date: July 28, 1985
- Former call signs: KLJB-TV (1985–2009)
- Former channel numbers: Analog: 18 (UHF, 1985–2009); Digital: 49 (UHF, until 2020)
- Former affiliations: Independent (1985–1986, 1988–1990)
- Call sign meaning: Lee J. Blumberg, father of the Hanna brothers, founders of the station

Technical information
- Licensing authority: FCC
- Facility ID: 54011
- ERP: 1,000 kW
- HAAT: 328.1 m (1,076 ft)
- Transmitter coordinates: 41°18′44.5″N 90°22′46.2″W

Links
- Public license information: Public file; LMS
- Website: www.ourquadcities.com

KLJB (channel 18) is a television station licensed to Davenport, Iowa, United States, serving as the Fox affiliate for the Quad Cities area. It is owned by Mission Broadcasting and operated by Nexstar Media Group alongside CBS affiliate WHBF-TV (channel 4) and CW station KGCW (channel 26); Nexstar's Tegna subsidiary owns ABC affiliate WQAD-TV (channel 8). KLJB, WHBF-TV, and KGCW share studios in the Telco Building on 18th Street in downtown Rock Island; KLJB's transmitter is located near Orion, Illinois.

KLJB began broadcasting in 1985 as the first independent station in the Quad Cities area, owned by a group of local and out-of-area partners. The station affiliated with Fox when it launched in 1986, though it left the network in March 1988 before returning two years later because of the popularity of The Simpsons. After emerging from bankruptcy in 1990, it was purchased by Grant Communications, which owned mostly mid-market independent stations and Fox affiliates. The station began airing local news programming at the end of 1999 in a partnership with a Davenport production company that evolved into the Independent News Network, specializing in the outsourced production of local TV newscasts.

Grant expanded with the launch of The WB programming in 1999, which was spun off as a separate station (KGWB-TV, now KGCW) in 2001. Black-owned Marshall Broadcasting Group acquired the station in 2014 as part of Nexstar's acquisition of Grant; Nexstar entered into a shared services agreement to provide services. Nexstar-owned WHBF began producing the station's newscast at the end of 2015. Mission purchased Marshall's stations in 2019 after the latter company filed for bankruptcy.

== History ==
=== Early history ===
Five applications were designated for comparative hearing in March 1983, though community surveys and filings had begun the year prior. Davenport Communications, Limited Partnership, was granted the construction permit in November after the five applicants entered into a settlement agreement; partners in the station included brothers Ed and Lee Hanna of New York, former Rock Island mayor James R. Davis, and Gary Brandt, who served as general manager. In June 1984, the board of supervisors in Henry County, Illinois, approved the rezoning of land at Orion for the station's transmitter; a Christmas launch was announced at that time, but the timeline had slipped to midyear by November. Station officials noted the Quad Cities' comparatively high cable TV penetration and its status as one of the larger remaining markets without an existing independent station.

KLJB-TV began broadcasting on July 28, 1985; it was named for the Hanna brothers' father, Lee J. Blumberg. As with other independents, its programming consisted of children's cartoons, syndicated reruns and movies, and sports. It operated from studios on 53rd Street in Davenport. In 1987, the station debuted Live on Tape, a local Saturday night sketch comedy program wrapped around a feature film.

The station was a charter affiliate of Fox when it launched in October 1986, but by early 1988, Brandt was expressing serious distaste with the network's constantly shifting programming. In January, he submitted a cancellation notice to Fox—which took effect on March 20—and shunted the network's Saturday night lineup to late nights. Meanwhile, in order to get out from expensive programming leases that had been made at the station's launch in 1985—some for titles KLJB-TV never aired—Davenport Communications filed for Chapter 11 bankruptcy protection. While the station was in bankruptcy, the Fox network found its stride with shows such as The Simpsons, but Quad Cities viewers had no access to the network's programming, even on cable. Even though station management said they had no desire to affiliate with Fox for the foreseeable future as late as April 1990, the stronger ratings and more stable identity convinced Brandt to return the station to the Fox network beginning that September. The move did result in fewer sports telecasts on the station to accommodate Fox programming.

=== Grant Broadcasting ownership ===
In December 1990, Davenport Communications emerged from bankruptcy and debtor-in-possession status, having met the terms of a repayment schedule that saw $250,000 to $350,000 in payments on what was originally a $2 million debt. Two months later, the company agreed to sell KLJB-TV to Florida-based Grant Communications. Its founder, Milton Grant, had only the year before returned to television station ownership with the purchase of WZDX in Huntsville, Alabama. Grant extended the station's reach in 1996 by buying and restoring to air KJMH (channel 26) in Burlington, Iowa, which began to simulcast KLJB. The Burlington station, whose signal did not reach the Quad Cities, had gone on the air in January 1988 as a Fox affiliate. However, in May 1994, it lost the network affiliation (picking up Channel America programming to fill the void), and six months later, it went off the air.

KLJB-TV acquired the rights to programming from The WB in the Quad Cities market in September 1999 as a result of Superstation WGN ceasing carriage of WB programming nationally. Selected WB shows aired in late night time slots on channel 18. Grant then relaunched KJMH as KGWB-TV, a separately programmed WB affiliate, in January 2001. However, it was not even the only channel 26 in the market. WBQD-LP, a low-power UPN affiliate, went on the air from Moline in 2002. As early as 2003, KGWB-TV's programming was added to a digital subchannel of KLJB-TV, making it available over-the-air in the Quad Cities. KGWB-TV became the local affiliate of The CW upon the merger of The WB and UPN in 2006 under new KGCW-TV call letters.

=== Nexstar ownership ===
On November 6, 2013, Irving, Texas–based Nexstar Broadcasting Group announced that it would purchase the Grant stations, including KLJB and KGCW, for $87.5 million. Due to Federal Communications Commission (FCC) ownership regulations (as Nexstar was also in the process of acquiring WHBF-TV, the local CBS affiliate), KLJB was to then be spun off to Mission Broadcasting, with Nexstar providing operational support through a shared services agreement as with other Mission-owned stations. However, on June 6, 2014, Nexstar announced that it would instead sell KLJB and two other Fox stations to Marshall Broadcasting Group—a new, minority-controlled company headed by Pluria Marshall Jr.—for $58.5 million. While this company acquired much of the station's assets, Nexstar entered into a shared services agreement to provide non-programming resources (such as master control) and advertising sales for Marshall's three stations. The sale was completed on December 1, 2014.

In November 2014, while Nexstar was still waiting for the completion of its sale of KLJB to Marshall Broadcasting, there was speculation by other local media that KGCW might move to a WHBF subchannel. This occurred in May 2015 as a direct consequence of the sale. The simulcast was then discontinued in 2020, when KGCW was relocated from a tower at Seaton, Illinois, halfway between Burlington and the Quad Cities, to Orion.

Nexstar twice acquired other companies that owned Quad Cities-area television stations, selling them off to retain WHBF-TV and KGCW. In 2016, it acquired Media General, owner of NBC affiliate KWQC-TV; that station was spun off to Gray Television. When Nexstar acquired Tribune Media in 2019, it spun off ABC affiliate WQAD-TV (channel 8) to Tegna Inc.

On December 3, 2019, Marshall Broadcasting Group filed for Chapter 11 bankruptcy protection. Marshall also sued Nexstar, alleging that the company sought to "sabotage" his business so that Nexstar could reclaim his stations by way of Mission Broadcasting. Mission agreed to purchase Marshall Broadcasting's stations for $49 million on March 30, 2020. The transaction received FCC approval in August 2020.

== Newscasts ==
=== Independent News Network ===
On December 31, 1999, KLJB-TV launched a 30-minute prime time newscast known as the Fox 18 Nine O'Clock News, airing Sunday through Friday. In an unusual arrangement, production of the newscast was outsourced to Davenport video production house EBI Video, with Grant providing marketing and sales support. EBI provided the news presenters and facilities. The station previously had only aired syndicated weather updates.

For EBI, the KLJB partnership was a springboard to the remote production of TV newscasts for stations elsewhere in the United States. In April 2001, EBI began to produce a second newscast, for WVFX in Clarksburg, West Virginia. EBI was supplanted by Independent News Network (INN), which specialized in the outsourced production of television newscasts for small-market local stations from its Tremont Avenue studios. The company also brought weather production in house in 2003. INN filed for Chapter 7 bankruptcy in January 2009; a new company, Fusion Communications, acquired the assets and retained most of the staff, the INN name, and nearly all of the clients, including KLJB.

=== News share agreements ===
After nearly 11 years, KLJB ended its relationship with INN in September 2010 and began having the newscast produced under contract by another local TV station. The first station to do so was WQAD-TV, whose general manager successfully convinced KLJB to partner with it for its newscast. The change in producer also led to the debut of a Saturday night newscast for the first time.

On December 31, 2012, newscast production changed hands again, this time to KWQC-TV. This continued until December 30, 2015. By that time, the Nexstar purchase of WHBF-TV and shared services agreement had come into effect; it had been known for months that production of the newscast would be assumed by WHBF-TV.

A two-hour morning news extension to air from 7 to 9 a.m.—the only such local program in the market—was added in September 2017, by which time the late newscast had expanded to one hour.

== Technical information ==
=== Subchannels ===
KLJB's transmitter is located near Orion, Illinois. Its signal is multiplexed:

Subchannels of KLJB
Subchannel	Res.	Short name	Programming
18.1	720p	KLJB-DT	Fox
18.2	480i	MeTV	MeTV
18.3	480i	Defy	Defy
18.4	480i	Bounce	Bounce TV
26.1	720p	KGCW-DT	The CW (KGCW)
26.4	480i	CBS-SD	CBS (WHBF-TV) in SD via KGCW

Broadcast on behalf of another station

=== Analog-to-digital conversion ===
KLJB-TV shut down its analog signal, over UHF channel 18, at noon on June 12, 2009, the official date on which full-power television stations in the United States transitioned from analog to digital broadcasts under federal mandate. The station's digital signal remained on its pre-transition UHF channel 49, using virtual channel 18.
