= WTWO =

Television station in Terre Haute, Indiana

- Terre Haute, Indiana; United States
- Channels: Digital: 35 (UHF); Virtual: 2
- Branding: WTWO; Wabash Valley's CW (2.2)

Programming
- Affiliations: 2.1: NBC; 2.2: CW+; for others, see § Subchannels

Ownership
- Owner: Nexstar Media Group; (Nexstar Media Inc.)
- Sister stations: WAWV-TV

History
- First air date: September 1, 1965
- Former channel numbers: Analog: 2 (VHF, 1965–2009; Digital: 36 (UHF, until 2019)
- Former affiliations: ABC (secondary, 1965–1973)
- Call sign meaning: Channel 2

Technical information
- Licensing authority: FCC
- Facility ID: 20426
- ERP: 464 kW
- HAAT: 296 m (971 ft)
- Transmitter coordinates: 39°14′33″N 87°23′29″W

Links
- Public license information: Public file; LMS
- Website: www.mywabashvalley.com

WTWO (channel 2) is a television station in Terre Haute, Indiana, United States, affiliated with NBC and The CW. It is owned by Nexstar Media Group and operated alongside ABC affiliate WAWV-TV (channel 38). The two stations share studios and transmitter facilities on US 41/150 in unincorporated Sullivan County (south of Farmersburg).

== History ==
The station first signed on the air on September 1, 1965. Founded by Illiana Telecasting, the first program ever broadcast on WTWO was NBC's morning news program Today, which aired at 7 that morning. WTWO, whose call letters were originally assigned to what is now fellow NBC affiliate WLBZ in Bangor, Maine, from 1954 to 1958, originally operated as a primary NBC affiliate with a secondary affiliation with ABC; it carried ABC network programs either on tape delay or by airing them live from the network feed through occasional preemptions of NBC programs (the most notable preemption being the 1967–1969 science fiction series Star Trek).

Eleven days after its sign-on, on September 12, 1965, WTWO began broadcasting network programming in color. Illiana Telecasting sold the station to Booth Newspapers in 1968. ABC programming was split between channel 2 and primary CBS affiliate WTHI-TV (channel 10) until April 1973, when the network moved to upstart WIIL-TV (channel 38, now WAWV-TV, which would eventually drop ABC to join Fox in September 1995 and rejoin ABC in September 2011). In July 1975, Booth Newspapers sold the station to Malcolm Glazer's Fabri Development Corporation. Malcolm Glazer sold WTWO and two of its sister stations, WRBL in Columbus, Georgia, and KQTV in St. Joseph, Missouri, to TCS Television Partners in 1990. TCS Television Partners sold both WTWO and KQTV to Irving, Texas–based Nexstar Broadcasting Group in 1997.

In the spring of 2006, the station dropped on-air references to its channel 2 allocation in its branding, opting to brand simply by the WTWO call letters; the channel 2 branding was restored on October 18, 2010, when it changed its on-air brand to "NBC 2".

On July 9, 2012, Time Warner Cable replaced Cincinnati NBC affiliate WLWT with WTWO on its systems in southwestern Ohio and northeastern Kentucky, due to a carriage dispute with WLWT owner Hearst Television, that resulted in its stations being pulled from TWC's systems in several markets. Nexstar complained that Time Warner Cable substituted the Hearst stations with its own outside of their market areas without permission, while the provider alleged it was within its rights to carry select Nexstar-owned stations as replacements until it reached a new agreement with Hearst, which Hearst and Time Warner Cable reached on July 19, restoring WLWT on its Cincinnati area systems.

Nexstar announced that it would acquire Media General, owner of rival WTHI-TV on January 27, 2016. Despite WTHI's higher ratings, on March 4, 2016, Nexstar and Mission declared their intentions to keep WTWO/WAWV and sell WTHI to another company; four months later; on June 13, 2016, it announced that WTHI and four other stations would be acquired by Heartland Media, through its USA Television MidAmerica Holdings joint venture with MSouth Equity Partners, for $115 million, to comply with Federal Communications Commission (FCC) ownership caps.

On September 1, 2024, WTWO-DT2 assumed The CW affiliation in Terre Haute from WTHI-TV; Nexstar owns the network.

== Controversy ==
WTWO made national news in January 2006 when it declined to air the controversial NBC dramedy series The Book of Daniel, citing calls and emails from viewers objecting to the show's plotline involving Jesus Christ as the rationale for its decision. In a statement on the station's website, then-general manager Duane Lammers stated "our relationship with NBC always provided for the right to reject programming. I am reaffirming that right to let them know I will not allow them to make unilateral decisions affecting our viewers". Due to poor ratings and affiliates in other markets (including Little Rock sister station KARK-TV) also choosing to preempt the program, NBC canceled the show after only three episodes (this incident may have served as the basis for a plotline in a 2006 episode of the short-lived NBC drama Studio 60 on the Sunset Strip, in which an NBC affiliate in Terre Haute refused to air the titular comedy series in the show because of a sketch called "Crazy Christians").

== News operation ==
WTWO presently broadcasts 17 hours of locally produced newscasts each week (with three hours each weekday and one hour each on Saturdays and Sundays). Unlike most NBC affiliates in the Eastern Time Zone, the station does not air a 5 p.m. newscast; this is due to the fact that it produces one for sister station WAWV-TV, with channel 2 opting to run syndicated programming during the 5 p.m. timeslot.

Newscasts on the station began when it debuted on September 1, 1965, under the title W-2 News. In early 1968, the station rebranded as "TV-2" (while retaining a hyphen for the branding of the station's calling, rendered as "W-TWO"); its evening newscasts were accordingly renamed Total News Tonight (the title was later amended to Total News at Twelve, when the station added a midday newscast at noon, and to Total News Today for the 6 p.m. newscast). The TV-2 News title was used in conjunction with the Total News brand from 1971 until January 1972, when the former became the full-time newscast branding. The station became the first station in the market to begin broadcasting its newscasts in color in 1971, with Johnny Palmer being hired as anchor of WTWO's evening newscasts (Palmer remained with the station until he retired in 1992). In 1973, the station adopted the Eyewitness News format for its news programs, which remained in use by the station until 1994, when its newscasts were renamed NewsChannel 2 (which was amended to WTWO NewsChannel 2 after Nexstar bought channel 2 in 1997, and then revised as WTWO NewsChannel in 2007).

The station debuted an hour-long news and talk program in September 1998, titled Live at Five. After WTWO entered into a joint sales agreement with Fox affiliate WBAK-TV, WTWO assumed production responsibilities for channel 38's half-hour primetime newscast at 10 p.m. on January 1, 2004, from WTHI (which had been producing the program since WBAK became the market's Fox affiliate in 1995), in addition to allowing the station to rebroadcast the 6 a.m. hour of channel 2's weekday morning newscast at 7 a.m. In May 2007, WTWO began using digital camera equipment for newsgathering purposes. In 2010, the station unveiled a new set for its newscasts, along with a new graphics and music package (using the "Look B" package originally developed by graphics firm NBC ArtWorks for NBC's owned-and-operated stations, along with Stephen Arnold Music's "The Rock" package); the station's news operation was also rebranded as NBC 2 News.

WTWO aired a one-minute promo on 2006 that criticized WTHI's weather coverage, claiming that WTHI's Doppler radar system was inferior to WTWO's because it was located within downtown Terre Haute, resulting in a "dead zone"—the area within the radius of the radar dome where reflectivity cannot be detected—over the city proper, stating that the WTWO radar's "dead zone" was positioned over a corn field and claimed that the combined experience of WTWO's weather staff was more than that of WTHI's staff; it also stated that WTHI's power had multiple points of failure in contrast to WTWO's. The promotion, though technically accurate, became a source of amusement on Comedy Central's The Daily Show because of its use of hyperbole and techniques reminiscent of political "attack ads". After general manager Duane Lammers called the Daily Show "hard-up for material" in a Tribune-Star article, host Jon Stewart mocked WTWO further in the following night's opening segment. A response video to The Daily Show and Stewart that was supposed to be for internal uses at the station was leaked on YouTube; it has since been taken down, but was uploaded once more on iFilm.

When what became WFXW discontinued its Fox affiliation to rejoin ABC as WAWV on September 1, 2011, WTWO moved its 5 p.m. newscast to WAWV (at the same time, the 10 p.m. newscast was relegated to live streaming broadcast, which was carried on WTWO/WAWV's shared website until it was discontinued on December 28, 2012). WTWO began producing a half-hour midday newscast at noon of channel 38 on September 10, 2012. In addition to handling production of those newscasts, WTWO produces local weather updates seen on WAWV during AgDay and Good Morning America, as well as morning news updates seen during WAWV's network morning program.

On September 28, 2016, WTWO (along with sister station WAWV) began airing local newscasts in HD with a new set. WTWO also changed the newscast title to WTWO News, formerly NBC 2 News.

In 2025, the noon newscast on WAWV began simulcasting on WTWO, and in turn became a WTWO-branded production.

=== Notable former on-air staff ===
- Julie Nelson, anchor

== Technical information ==
=== Subchannels ===
The station's signal is multiplexed:

Subchannels of WTWO
Subchannel	Res.	Short name	Programming
2.1	1080i	WTWO-DT	NBC
2.2	720p	CW	The CW Plus
2.3	480i	Laff	Laff
2.4	480i	Antenna	Antenna TV

On June 15, 2016, Nexstar announced that it had entered into an affiliation agreement with Katz Broadcasting for the Escape (now Ion Mystery), Laff, Grit, and Bounce TV networks (the last one of which was owned by Bounce Media LLC, whose COO Jonathan Katz worked as president/CEO of Katz Broadcasting), bringing the four networks to 81 stations owned and/or operated by Nexstar, including WTWO and WAWV-TV. Subchannels Laff and Escape were off the air from July 25, 2017, to May 15, 2018, due to transmission problems. A temporary antenna had been used to broadcast WTWO and sister station WAWV-TV on 2.1 and 38.1. As of May 15, 2018, the new antenna was installed, and all subchannels returned to the air, including newly available Cozi TV. On February 1, 2021, Antenna TV replaced Cozi TV on 2.4.

=== Analog-to-digital conversion ===
WTWO ended regular programming on its analog signal, over VHF channel 2, on June 12, 2009, the official date on which full-power television stations in the United States transitioned from analog to digital broadcasts under federal mandate. The station's digital signal remained on its pre-transition UHF channel 36, using virtual channel 2.
