= Nexstar Media Group =

American media company

Nexstar Media Group, Inc.
- Formerly: Nexstar Broadcasting Group, Inc. (1996–2017)
- Type: Public
- Traded as: Nasdaq: NXST; S&P 400 component
- ISIN: US65336K1034
- Industry: Mass media
- Predecessors: Quorum Broadcasting; Newport Television; Grant Broadcasting; Communications Corporation of America; Media General; West Virginia Media Holdings; Tribune Media/Broadcasting
- Founded: June 17, 1996; 30 years ago
- Founder: Perry A. Sook
- Headquarters: Irving, Texas, U.S. (corporate); New York City (operational); Chicago, Illinois (additional office)
- Area served: United States
- Key people: Perry A. Sook; (founder, chairman, & CEO); Michael Biard; (president & COO); Lee Ann Gliha; (CFO)
- Services: Broadcasting; Publishing
- Revenue: ▼US$4.95 billion (2025)
- Net income: ▼US$109 million (2025)
- Owner: Perry A. Sook (largest insider shareholder)
- Number of employees: 18,505 (2026)
- Divisions: Nexstar Broadcasting; Nexstar Digital; The CW; NewsNation; The Hill
- Subsidiaries: Tegna Inc.
- Website: nexstar.tv

Nexstar Media Group, Inc. is an American multimedia conglomerate headquartered in Irving, Texas, with operational headquarters in Midtown Manhattan and an additional office in Chicago. Founded on June 17, 1996, Nexstar is the largest television broadcasting company in the United States, owning 265 television stations—most of which are affiliated with the four major American television networks and MyNetworkTV—in markets as large as New York City and as small as San Angelo, Texas, and operating additional stations through local marketing agreements with certain affiliates such as Mission Broadcasting and Vaughan Media to satisfy existing regulations set in place by the Federal Communications Commission.

In addition, Nexstar owns three radio stations, WGN in Chicago, WBNS and WBNS-FM in Columbus, owns 81% of and operates mid-major TV network The CW and oversees The CW Plus syndication service, in which all CW and CW Plus affiliates the company previously owned became directly owned-and-operated stations (O&O). The company also owns two terrestrial television networks airing classic shows, Antenna TV and Rewind TV, one FAST channel airing sports programming, SportsGrid, and controls pay television network NewsNation. In the context of media consolidation in the 2020s, Nexstar has been described as less politically conservative than competitor Sinclair Broadcast Group.

== History ==
=== 1996–2010: Formation ===
Nexstar Broadcasting Group logo (June 17, 1996–2006)

Nexstar Broadcasting Group logo (2006–January 17, 2017)

Nexstar Media Group was formed as Nexstar Broadcasting Group on June 17, 1996, initially backed by ABRY Partners. The first television station bought by Nexstar was WYOU in Scranton, Pennsylvania. Nexstar bought WYOU from Diversified Communications. The sale was completed on September 28 of that year. Nexstar promptly fired two anchors and laid off several long-term staff members. Nexstar founder Perry Sook said that WYOU would be Nexstar's flagship station, keeping an office off the newsroom for years. In 1998, Nexstar purchased WBRE-TV in Wilkes-Barre, Pennsylvania. Because this was in the same market as WYOU, WYOU was 'sold' to Mission Broadcasting. This began the first-ever 'shared-services' agreement between stations. WYOU's sales staff was kept in Scranton, while the production and news operations were moved to WBRE's offices in Wilkes-Barre. WYOU staff who were not laid off were fired by Nexstar, hired by Mission, and eventually rehired by Nexstar. Mission Broadcasting then paid Nexstar to operate and control the production and news-gathering operations while Mission kept the sales and management team.

In 1997, Nexstar acquired WJET-TV in Erie, Pennsylvania, from Jet Broadcasting, for which it paid $18.5 million. On January 12, 1998, Nexstar acquired three stations owned by the U.S. Broadcast Group, including KFDX-TV, KBTV-TV, and KSNF, for $64.3 million. In 1999, Nexstar bought out WROC-TV in Rochester, New York, from Smith Broadcasting. In 2003, Nexstar acquired Quorum Broadcasting, owner of ten television stations. Also that year, it went public on the NASDAQ, and purchased KARK-TV and WDHN-TV from Morris Multimedia. In 2006, Nexstar bought out WTAJ-TV and the licensee rights of WLYH-TV from SJL Broadcasting for $56 million.

On March 20, 2009, Nexstar operated television stations that were owned by Four Points Media Group through an outsourcing agreement. However, on September 8, 2011, Sinclair Broadcast Group announced its intent to purchase the Four Points stations outright and took over the MSA for the stations that October upon Federal Trade Commission (FTC) approval of the deal. The Federal Communications Commission (FCC) gave final approval of the group deal on December 21, and the Sinclair purchase of the Four Points stations was completed on January 1, 2012.

=== 2011–2013: Retransmission consent dispute with Fox ===
In 2011, Nexstar and Fox entered into a dispute over terms of reverse compensation; this occurred as Fox began to aggressively seek shares of earnings from retransmission consent agreements with cable and satellite operators as part of affiliation agreement renewals between station groups with affiliates whose affiliation contracts had already expired (and carrying the network's programming without a contractual agreement) or were near expiration. Reportedly, the amount from retransmission consent fees from cable and satellite operators that Fox wanted its affiliates to pay the network would be 25 cents per subscriber during the first year of the affiliation agreement, increasing to 50 cents by the fourth year. President of affiliate sales and marketing for Fox, Mike Hopkins, had said earlier in the year that the network would consider moving its affiliation to another market station as a last resort if existing affiliates did not agree to the terms for reverse compensation retrans sharing.

Fox dropped its affiliation from Nexstar-owned/managed stations in four markets, with three of the replacement stations adding Fox in addition to existing affiliations with the MyNetworkTV programming service (owned by Fox parent company News Corporation). In Indiana, two markets saw Fox go from a primary affiliation of one station to joining an existing MyNetworkTV-affiliated digital subchannel of a competing Big Three station, with MyNetworkTV going to a secondary affiliation: in Evansville, Fox moved from WTVW (which then became an independent station and later joined the CW) to a MyNetworkTV-affiliated subchannel of CBS affiliate WEVV-TV on July 1, while in Fort Wayne, the Fox affiliation moved from WFFT-TV to a MyNetworkTV-affiliated subchannel of NBC affiliate WISE-TV on August 1. The network also moved its affiliation in Springfield, Missouri from KSFX-TV (operated in a duopoly with area CBS affiliate KOLR) to upstart MyNetworkTV affiliate KRBK on September 1, 2011, with both stations becoming independents.

Nexstar chose to drop Fox from WFXW in Terre Haute, Indiana and re-affiliate with ABC on September 1, 2011 (becoming the only Nexstar station thus far to affiliate with another network following the removal of the Fox affiliation) as part of a long-term renewal agreement between Nexstar and ABC for the group's nine existing ABC stations, reversing a 1995 switch that saw Terre Haute losing over-the-air carriage of ABC programs (since then, ABC has been seen in the market via Indianapolis affiliate WRTV on area cable and satellite providers); the Fox affiliation then moved to a digital subchannel of CBS affiliate WTHI-TV which also added MyNetworkTV as a secondary affiliation. Nexstar's remaining Fox affiliates have since signed a renewal agreement through December 2013; In addition, following the settlement of Nexstar's antitrust lawsuit against WISE-TV's then-owner Granite Broadcasting, WFFT-TV reclaimed the Fox affiliation on March 1, 2013. Nexstar would purchase KRBK in late 2018, restoring its ownership of the Fox affiliation in the Springfield, Missouri market.

=== 2012–2019: Expansion by acquisitions ===
In July 2012, Nexstar agreed to purchase eleven stations and Inergize Digital Media from Newport Television, with two stations going to affiliate Mission Broadcasting. On August 12, 2012, Nexstar sold KBTV-TV to Deerfield Media, which entered into a JSA and SSA with Sinclair Broadcast Group to become a duopoly with KFDM-TV. On April 24, 2013, Nexstar announced that it would acquire the entire group of Communications Corporation of America, KMSS-TV, KPEJ-TV, and most of the ComCorp-managed stations that are owned by White Knight Broadcasting would be sold to Mission Broadcasting while WEVV-TV and White Knight Broadcasting's KSHV-TV would be sold to a female-controlled company called Rocky Creek Communications, with Nexstar assuming operational control of those stations.

On September 16, 2013, Nexstar announced that it would acquire WOI-DT, KCAU-TV, and WHBF-TV from Citadel Communications for $88 million. Nexstar immediately took over the stations' operations through a time brokerage agreement. The deal followed Phil Lombardo's decision to "slow down", as well as a desire by Lynch Entertainment to divest its investments in WOI and WHBF; Citadel would continue to own KLKN, WLNE-TV, and its Sarasota properties. On March 5, 2014, the Federal Communications Commission approved the sale of these stations to Nexstar outright and the deal was completed on March 13. KCAU continued to use Citadel's standardized news sets, graphics and logos. On November 6, 2013, Nexstar announced that it would purchase the Grant Broadcasting stations for $87.5 million. Due to Federal Communications Commission ownership regulations, one of the stations, KLJB, was spun off to Marshall Broadcasting Group, but is operated by Nexstar through a shared services agreement. The sale was completed on December 1, 2014. In 2015, Nexstar sold off the licensee assets of WLYH-TV, the CW affiliate to Howard Stirk Holdings.

On March 13, 2014, Nexstar announced that it would purchase Internet Broadcasting, for $20 million. The company had also recently acquired competitor Inergize Digital through its purchase of assets from Newport Television, followed by Enterprise Technology Group, a spun-off joint venture between LIN Media and Fox Television Stations. The providers were merged to form Lakana, led by former ETG CEO Phillip Hyun. On October 23, 2014, Nexstar bought out KASW in Phoenix from SagamoreHill Broadcasting and Meredith Corporation, and it was completed on January 30, 2015.

On February 2, 2015, Nexstar finalized its acquisition of Yashi, a location-focused, video-advertising and programmatic-technology company, for $33 million. On November 17, 2015, Nexstar announced its intent to purchase West Virginia Media Holdings' stations (WOWK-TV in Charleston, WBOY-TV in Clarksburg, WVNS-TV in Ghent, and WTRF-TV in Wheeling) for $130 million. The company took over the stations' non-license assets under a time brokerage agreement in December 2015 pending the formal completion of the deal, expected in late 2016. The two companies viewed the acquisition as being a complement to Nexstar's WHAG-TV, whose coverage area includes the Eastern Panhandle region. Nexstar CEO Perry A. Sook is an alumnus of WOWK. The sale was completed on January 31, 2017.

On August 1, 2018, Nexstar bought out KRBK in Springfield from Koplar Communications for $16.45 million, and also bought out WHDF in Huntsville from Lockwood Broadcast Group for $2.25 million. On November 1, 2018, Nexstar bought out MyNetworkTV affiliate KFVE in Honolulu from American Spirit Media as part of transactions requiring from the Raycom Media/Gray Television merger. In spring 2019, Nexstar launched Border Report, a website focusing on news stories from the Mexico–United States border.

On November 5, 2019, it was announced that Nexstar would acquire Fox Television Stations-owned WJZY and MyNetworkTV outlet WMYT-TV in Charlotte, North Carolina for $45 million. In turn, it also announced that it would sell its duopoly of Seattle-based KCPQ and KZJO (along with Milwaukee-based WITI) to FTS in a separate deal worth $350 million. Nexstar made the transactions to pay down debt and consolidate operations in the Southeast. The sale closed on March 2, 2020. As part of a settlement between the parties in litigation over the failed deal, Sinclair had to sell WDKY-TV in Lexington, Kentucky, and the non-license assets of KGBT-TV in Harlingen, Texas, to Nexstar Media Group for $60 million on January 27, 2020. The company's founder, Perry Sook, had once been a principal of Superior Communications, who owned the WDKY property, making the sale to Nexstar a homecoming of sorts. WDKY's transaction was completed on September 17, 2020.

==== 2015–2017: Acquisition of Media General ====
On September 28, 2015, Nexstar announced that it had presented an unsolicited offer to buy Media General for $4.1 billion (including debt). Per share, shareholders of Media General would receive $10.50 in cash and 0.0898 shares of Nexstar, a total equivalent of $14.50 per share. Nexstar's offer was seen by analysts as a maneuver to torpedo the merger of Media General with Meredith Corporation (announced on September 8). If Media General agreed to the counteroffer within a 20-day period, Nexstar would expand its portfolio to 114 television stations, pending spinoffs in markets where both own stations and federal approval. On November 16, Media General rejected the offer but agreed to negotiate after concluding its merge with Meredith.

On January 27, 2016, Media General announced that it had entered into a definitive agreement to be acquired by Nexstar in a deal valued at $17.14 per share, valuing the company at $4.6 billion plus the assumption of $2.3 billion debt. The combined company became known as Nexstar Media Group, and owns 171 stations, serving an estimated 39-percent of U.S. households. The company paid Meredith Corporation (whom Media General had previously proposed a merger with) a termination fee of $60 million and gave Meredith right of first refusal to acquire any broadcast or digital properties that may be divested during the purchase. The deal also included contingent value rights for Media General shareholders if it sold spectrum from its stations during the FCC's spectrum incentive auction (a clause that Meredith did not exercise).

On May 27, 2016, Nexstar announced the sales of five stations. WCWJ in Jacksonville, Florida, along with WSLS-TV in Roanoke, Virginia, was sold to the Graham Media Group; and KADN-TV, as well as KLAF-LD in Lafayette, Louisiana, was sold to Bayou City Broadcasting, with KREG-TV in Glenwood Springs, Colorado going to Marquee Broadcasting as part of a series of divestitures required following Nexstar's acquisition of Media General due to Federal Communications Commission ownership caps (the sale of the Roanoke and Lafayette stations are required as Media General and Nexstar both own stations in those markets). On June 3, 2016, it was announced that Nexstar would spin off WBAY-TV in Green Bay, Wisconsin and KWQC-TV in Davenport, Iowa to Gray Television for $270 million.

On June 13, 2016, Nexstar announced that it would sell WFFT in Fort Wayne, Indiana; KQTV in St. Joseph, Missouri; KIMT in Rochester, Minnesota; WTHI-TV in Terre Haute; and WLFI in Lafayette, Indiana to Heartland Media, through its USA Television MidAmerica Holdings joint venture with MSouth Equity Partners, for $115 million. The divestitures were in order to allow Nexstar to comply with FCC ownership rules (specifically pertaining to national market coverage for station owners) in advance of the approval proceedings of the merger of both groups (Nexstar already owned NBC affiliate WTWO and operates ABC affiliate WAWV-TV in Terre Haute, and planned to acquire Media General-owned CBS affiliate WANE-TV in Fort Wayne).

On June 30, 2016, Nexstar announced that it would sell KASA-TV in Santa Fe, to Ramar Communications, owner of Telemundo affiliate KTEL-CD (channel 15), Movies! affiliate KUPT-LD (channel 16), and MeTV affiliate KRTN-LD (channel 33), for $2.5 million. KASA and KRQE were both ranked among the top four stations in the Albuquerque market during the November 2015 sweeps period, which meant that the company had to divest one of the two stations to comply with the FCC duopoly rules. The transaction was approved by the FCC on January 11, 2017, and the sale was completed on January 17.

==== 2017–2019: Merger with Tribune Media ====
On April 30, 2017, The Wall Street Journal reported that there were competing bids for Tribune Media from Nexstar and a partnership between 21st Century Fox and private equity firm Blackstone Group. However, on May 8, 2017, it was announced that Tribune reached a deal to be acquired by Sinclair Broadcast Group. On May 26, 2017, it was reported by DealReporter that Nexstar might be considering a bid to acquire Tegna Inc., although such a deal would likely require significant divestments due to ownership conflicts and exceeding the ownership cap.

On November 14, 2018, after Tribune cancelled its proposed sale to Sinclair, it was reported that Nexstar was a leading bidder to acquire Tribune. On December 3, 2018, Nexstar announced its intent to merge with Tribune Media for $6.4 billion ($4.1 billion for all of Tribune's shares in cash and $2.3 billion of Tribune's debt). The merger would give the company 216 stations in 118 markets, placing it just below the FCC's market cap of 39-percent of TV households and making it the largest owner of television stations in the United States. Nexstar planned to divest some stations and "non-core" assets as part of the merger.

On March 20, 2019, Nexstar announced that it would divest 19 stations to the E. W. Scripps Company and Tegna Inc. for a total sum of $1.32 billion, with Scripps receiving eight stations (WPIX, WSFL-TV, WTKR and WGNT, WTVR-TV, WXMI, KSTU, and KASW), and Tegna eleven (WATN-TV and WLMT, WTIC-TV and WCCT-TV, WOI-DT and KCWI, WNEP, WPMT, WQAD-TV, WZDX, and KFSM-TV). Of those stations, only WPIX was not associated with a duopoly, but rather its market size (an outright acquisition under current FCC rules would cause Nexstar to exceed the 39 percent cap). The transaction involving WPIX included a $75 million option condition allowing Nexstar to buy WPIX back between March 31, 2020, and the end of 2021. In the summer of 2020, the option was transferred to Mission Broadcasting (whose station acquisitions are largely funded by Nexstar) and exercised shortly thereafter. Nexstar stated that these divestitures would be used to help fund the sale and cover debt. On April 8, 2019, Nexstar announced that it would sell 2 additional stations (WISH-TV and WNDY) to Circle City Broadcasting for $42.5 million.

On April 3, 2019, Marshall Broadcasting Group sued Nexstar for breach of contract, alleging that the company was trying to "undermine" its operations so it could buy back the stations at a later date and lower cost in the present regulatory environment. The company also accused Nexstar of using the divestiture of stations to a minority-owned broadcaster as a token to gain FCC approval for the associated acquisitions. A carriage dispute with AT&T resulted in the removal of more than 120 Nexstar stations across 97 markets from AT&T's DirecTV, DirecTV Now and U-verse platforms, which began at 11:59 p.m. on July 3, 2019, and ended on August 29, 2019. On August 1, 2019, the United States Department of Justice approved the deal between Nexstar Media Group and Tribune Media. The merger was approved by the FCC on September 16, and would be consummated three days later.

=== 2020–2024: Launch of NewsNation and acquisition of The CW ===
On January 15, 2020, Nexstar announced a national newscast called NewsNation on WGN America. The program launched September 1, 2020. On March 1, 2021, the WGN America channel was renamed NewsNation. On October 22, 2020, Nexstar underwent a corporate reorganization, under which its primary subsidiaries of Nexstar Broadcasting and Nexstar Digital were merged into the operating subsidiary Nexstar, Inc. A carriage dispute with Dish Network began on December 2, 2020, and ended by Christmas Eve, which resulted in the removal of at least 164 Nexstar stations in 115 markets, covering about 63-percent of TV homes, from its services. On December 16, 2020, Nexstar announced it was purchasing BestReviews from Tribune Publishing for $160 million. That same month, FuboTV reached an agreement with Nexstar to begin carrying WGN America in January 2021.

On May 20, 2021, The CW and Nexstar announced that they have reached multi-year agreements to renew network affiliation for the CW in 37 markets in across the country (including KTLA in Los Angeles and WDCW in Washington, D.C.). On August 20, 2021, Nexstar acquired political news website The Hill for $130 million. On August 25, 2021, Nexstar Media Group announced a partnership with SportsGrid Inc. to offer the latter's sports betting- and fantasy sports-focused FAST streaming channel SportsGrid as a digital multicast network starting September 1, 2021. A new digital subchannel network, Rewind TV, was launched on September 1, 2021, featuring classic TV shows from the 1980s and 1990s.

The Wall Street Journal reported on January 5, 2022, that Nexstar was a potential leading buyer of The CW, as the network's then-co-owners ViacomCBS and WarnerMedia explored options in selling a majority stake in the joint venture network; the three companies had yet to comment on the WSJ report. In late August, as confirmation to another WSJ report made last June, Nexstar announced that it has "entered a definitive agreement" to acquire 75% ownership in the network, while Paramount and WBD would each retain 12.5% ownership. Based on media industry reports, Nexstar would reportedly assume "a significant portion" of the network's current losses. The deal did not require regulatory approval, but had to perform financial closure conditions at the company's fiscal third quarter, i.e. by the start of October 2022, in order to complete the transaction; thus, Nexstar took over operations of the network on August 15. The transaction was completed on October 3.

Following Nexstar's purchase of The CW, Paramount's CBS News and Stations division was given the right to have its eight CW stations (WPSG in Philadelphia, WUPA in Atlanta, KBCW in San Francisco, KSTW in Seattle, WTOG in Tampa Bay, WKBD in Detroit, KMAX in Sacramento, and WPCW in Pittsburgh) disaffiliate from the network; such right was announced on May 5, 2023, when the aforementioned stations would become independent on September 1. Nexstar responded to the move by stating that it would find replacement CW affiliates, noting that "Paramount's decision affects a limited portion of The CW's nationwide reach." The company announced on May 8 that it would buy KUSI-TV from McKinnon Broadcasting for $35 million, pending approval from the FCC; the purchase, which was closed on September 2, created a duopoly with Nexstar's Fox affiliate KSWB-TV, and is set to replace KFMB-DT2 as San Diego's CW station.

Between June 14 to August 31, Nexstar announced that it would convert MyNetworkTV affiliates in the displaced Philadelphia, San Francisco, and Tampa Bay markets (WPHL-TV, KRON-TV, and WTTA, respectively) into CW stations, and signed several CW affiliation renewals (such as that with Gray, whose Atlanta-based WPCH-TV would replace WUPA as that city's CW affiliate) to cover the remaining displaced markets. WKBD ultimately regained the CW affiliation due to multiple issues with finding a long-term affiliate in Detroit, while a deal with Sinclair to acquire the CW affiliation in Pittsburgh and Seattle led to a reshuffling in the latter market, where the network moved from Paramount's KSTW to Sinclair's KUNS-TV (where it replaced Univision).

Nexstar implemented a blackout on its stations from DirecTV, U-verse and DirecTV Stream on July 2, 2023, causing DirecTV to complain to the FCC. Nexstar responded to DirecTV's complaint by stating that DirecTV was streaming Nexstar stations after the contract expired in November 2022. Nexstar and DirecTV renewed their contract on September 17, 2023. On May 19, 2023, Ray Cole, COO of Citadel Communications, announced that WSNN-LD in Sarasota, Florida, the lone remaining station under Citadel ownership, would be sold to Nexstar for $1 million. The sale was completed on July 20. On October 28, 2024, Nexstar Media Group announced plans to acquire WBNX-TV. Upon approval, the deal would create a duopoly with its existing Cleveland property WJW, and lead to the return of CW network programming on September 1, 2025, replacing WUAB whose owner Gray Media concurrently announced a relaunch of that station into a sports-focused independent. The sale was completed on February 1, 2025.

In December 2024, Nexstar acquired additional ownership of The CW, increasing its ownership stake from 75% to 77.1%.

=== 2025–present: Acquisition of Tegna and Jimmy Kimmel Live! pre-emption ===
On July 23, 2025, the Eighth Circuit Court of Appeals struck down a longstanding Federal Communications Commission (FCC) rule prohibiting ownership of two of the four highest-rated stations in a single media market, which in most areas applied to stations owned or affiliated with the Big Four television networks, likely requiring the FCC to formally repeal the rule as part of the quadrennial ownership rulemaking process. This ruling spurred the Nexstar–Tegna deal as well as several other transactions undertaken by rival broadcaster Gray Media (including purchases of stations owned by Allen Media Group and Block Communications), despite many of these transactions requiring formal changes to broadcast ownership regulations.

On August 19, 2025, Nexstar announced its intent to acquire Tegna for $6.2 billion; the acquisition would give it 265 stations in total, serving 80% of U.S. television households. In an interview with CNBC, Sook stated that the purchase was a move to "[play] offense and defense to maintain a vital industry for America and a vital resource for information", and place Nexstar "on a level playing field with Big Tech" in a "fragmented and rapidly evolving marketplace". Sook stated that in the 35 markets where this would create duopolies, Nexstar planned to keep station operations "autonomous". The agreement came ahead of a possible loosening of FCC ownership limits by the second Trump administration.

On September 17, 2025, Nexstar announced that it would pull Jimmy Kimmel Live! from its ABC stations, following remarks by host Jimmy Kimmel during the September 15 episode that accused the second Trump administration of characterizing the suspect in the assassination of Charlie Kirk as "anything other than one of them, and doing everything they can to score political points from it". Nexstar said the remark was "offensive and insensitive at a critical time in our national political discourse, and we do not believe they reflect the spectrum of opinions, views, or values of the local communities in which we are located". After Sinclair also pulled the program, ABC ultimately suspended Jimmy Kimmel Live! indefinitely.

While Nexstar stated that its decision to pull Jimmy Kimmel Live! was made unilaterally and was not influenced by any correspondence with the FCC or other agencies, it was observed that Nexstar was in the early stages of seeking FCC approval for its $6.2-billion acquisition of rival media company Tegna (announced on August 19), while Nexstar and Sinclair were among the station owners that had been lobbying the FCC to revise its broadcast ownership rules, including the proposed elimination of a rule passed in 2004—which would require Congressional approval to modify or repeal—that limits broadcasting companies from owning or controlling local television stations cumulatively reaching more than 39% of U.S. households. When Jimmy Kimmel Live! returned on September 22, both Nexstar and Sinclair continued to preempt it across their stations until September 26, when both companies announced that they would lift the blackout.

On November 18, 2025, Tegna's shareholders approved the company's merger with Nexstar Media Group. The transaction was expected to close by between July 1, 2026, and December 31, 2026, subject to regulatory approvals and other customary closing conditions. Upon closing, Tegna became a subsidiary of Nexstar Media Group, unlike past companies acquired by Nexstar, which were fully amalgamated into the company.

On November 24, 2025, Trump made a statement on Truth Social in opposition of removing the ownership cap, arguing that it would enable the growth of "radical left", "fake news networks" such as ABC and NBC (whom he referred to as being a "virtual arm of the Democrat Party [sic]"). In response, Nexstar stated that the major networks "already reach into every pocket, purse, and backpack in America," and modernizing the ownership rules would "ensure that local communities benefit from an array of fact-based local journalism—the anti-fake news—for years to come."

On February 7, 2026, in a reversal, Trump made a statement in support of the Nexstar/Tegna acquisition. He argued that it would enable more competition at a "higher and more sophisticated level" against "fake news national TV networks". The position was supported by FCC chairman Brendan Carr, who argued that media companies such as Comcast and Disney had "amassed too much power" and were "pushing this Hollywood & New York programming all over the country with no real check." Conservative media company Newsmax subsequently made a statement in opposition to the purchase, arguing that it would reduce competition and impact independent media outlets.

On March 18, 2026, the state of California alongside seven other states filed an antitrust lawsuit to block the merger, with the Attorney General Rob Bonta arguing that it would cause "irreparable harm to local news and consumers who rely on their reporting as a critical source of information." The next day, DirecTV also filed an antitrust suit within the same district court as the former. Later that day, the sale was approved by the Justice Department and the FCC. A temporary restraining order by the eight states was filed the day after.

On March 27, 2026, District Judge Troy Nunley granted a request for a 14-day temporary restraining order to suspend any further integration of Tegna into Nexstar, writing that it was "presumed likely to violate antitrust laws based on the combined firm market share alone." On March 31, Nunley consolidated the California and DirecTV lawsuits into a single case. The same day, Nexstar made a court filing requesting clarifications and changes to the TRO, arguing that it "cannot implement certain provisions of the TRO as written because of actions already completed at closing and legal obligations that cannot be reversed."

On July 23, 2026, it was announced that the Nexstar's CBS affiliates in six markets would switch to digital subchannels owned by Hearst Television and Forum Communications (for North Dakota) effective August 1. This includes KRQE, WIAT, WSPA-TV, WJTV (with an exemption of WHLT), KXMB-TV alongside KX Television, and semi-satellite KCLO-TV.

In August 2026, District Judge Troy Nunley clarified the preliminary injunction governing acquisition, ruling that current and former Nexstar officers, employees, directors, consultants, and other affiliated personnel could not serve on TEGNA's board without court approval. The court also ordered Nexstar and TEGNA to take steps to comply with the injunction and provide ongoing information concerning their compliance.

In late August, Nunley appointed Charles J. Stevens as a special master to monitor Nexstar and TEGNA's compliance with the preliminary injunction.

== Political views ==
Nexstar has been described as politically conservative and has a history of right-wing political contributions. Its programming has been described as less actively conservative than that of Sinclair Broadcast Group, with its stations not utilizing "synchronized", partisan pieces. In 2021, Nexstar saw staff departures at NewsNation over allegations of conservative bias.
