= WDCT =

- Fairfax, Virginia; United States
- Broadcast area: Northern Virginia; Washington, D.C.; Maryland
- Frequency: 1310 kHz
- Branding: K-Radio Washington D.C.

Programming
- Format: Korean
- Affiliations: Virginia Association of Broadcasters

Ownership
- Owner: Sukchan Lee & Kwangok Sung; (KBC Broadcasting Inc.)

History
- First air date: September 25, 1955
- Former call signs: WFCR (1955–1962); WEEL (1962–1985)
- Call sign meaning: Washington D.C. Talk (former format)

Technical information
- Licensing authority: FCC
- Facility ID: 20668
- Class: B
- Power: 5,000 watts day; 500 watts night
- Transmitter coordinates: 38°51′8.4″N 77°18′55.9″W

Links
- Public license information: Public file; LMS
- Website: www.dc1310.com

WDCT is a commercial radio station licensed to Fairfax, Virginia, and serving Northern Virginia, Washington, D.C., and Maryland. WDCT is operated and licensed to Sukchan Lee and Kwangok Sung, KBC Broadcasting Inc.

== History ==
As WEEL, the station was a popular Northern Virginia Top 40 music station in the 1960s and 1970s. After a number of brokered formats, WDCT became a Korean religious formatted broadcast radio station, serving Northern Virginia. WDCT was owned and operated by Kwang Ok Sung and Suk Chan Lee, through licensee KBC Broadcasting Inc.
