= Marshall Broadcasting Group =

American television broadcast company

Marshall Broadcasting Group, Inc.
- Company type: Private
- Industry: Broadcast Television; Television Production
- Founded: December 1, 2014; 10 years ago
- Defunct: September 1, 2020
- Fate: All broadcast assets acquired by Mission Broadcasting and operated by Nexstar Media Group
- Successor: Mission Broadcasting; Nexstar Media Group
- Headquarters: Houston, Texas, United States
- Area served: Iowa, Illinois, Louisiana and Texas
- Key people: Pluria Marshall, Jr. (President/CEO)
- Products: Broadcast television
- Owner: Pluria Marshall, Jr.
- Website: Official website

Marshall Broadcasting Group, Inc. was an American television broadcasting company that owned three full power television stations in Iowa, Louisiana and Texas. The company was founded on December 1, 2014 by Pluria Marshall, Jr. All three of its television stations were affiliated with Fox and were operated through shared services agreements by Nexstar Media Group.

== History ==
The company was owned by Pluria Marshall, Jr., who also owns Wave Community Newspapers, a group of African-American community newspapers in the Los Angeles region. Marshall had attempted to acquire stations in the 1990s and 2000s, but faced difficulties securing financing.

In 2014, Nexstar Broadcasting Group, which would later change its name to Nexstar Media Group in 2017, acquired the stock of television operators Grant Broadcasting, Communications Corporation of America, and White Knight Broadcasting. Due to FCC ownership limits, Nexstar sold former Grant station KLJB in Davenport, Iowa, and former ComCorp stations KPEJ-TV in Odessa, Texas and KMSS-TV in Shreveport, Louisiana, all three of which are Fox affiliates, to Marshall Broadcasting Group. Nexstar operated all three of the television stations through a shared services agreement, having provided non-programming resources to the stations such as master control, advertising sales and engineering support.

On April 3, 2019, the company filed a lawsuit against Nexstar Media Group for breach of contract, alleging that the company used the sale of these stations to minority owners as a ploy to gain favor with the FCC for the associated transactions, but had been engaging in conduct (including withholding retransmission consent fees) intended to "undermine" the company, so that its stations could be repurchased by Nexstar for a lower cost "[with] significantly less regulatory push-back" under the current political climate.

On December 3, 2019, Marshall Broadcasting Group filed for Chapter 11 bankruptcy protection. Mission Broadcasting, another company associated with Nexstar Media Group, agreed to purchase Marshall Broadcasting's stations for $49 million on March 30, 2020. The transaction was completed on September 1, 2020.

== Former Marshall-owned stations ==
City of License / Market	Station	Channel TV (RF)	Years owned	Current status
Davenport, Iowa / Quad Cities	KLJB	18 (30)	2014−2020	Fox affiliate owned by Mission Broadcasting (Operated under an SSA by Nexstar Media Group)
Shreveport, Louisiana	KMSS-TV	33 (34)	2015−2020	Fox affiliate owned by Mission Broadcasting (Operated under an SSA by Nexstar Media Group)
Odessa / Midland, Texas	KPEJ-TV	24 (23)	2015−2020	Fox affiliate owned by Mission Broadcasting (Operated under an SSA by Nexstar Media Group)
