= Gardeck =

Gardeck is a surname. Notable people with this surname include:

- Dennis Gardeck (born 1994), American football player
- Ian Gardeck (born 1990), American baseball pitcher
