= WYZZ-TV =

Television station in Bloomington, Illinois

- Bloomington–Normal–Peoria, Illinois; United States
- City: Bloomington, Illinois
- Channels: Digital: 28 (UHF); Virtual: 43
- Branding: WYZZ

Programming
- Affiliations: 43.1: Fox; 43.2: MeTV Toons; 43.3: Great

Ownership
- Owner: Cunningham Broadcasting; (Peoria (WYZZ-TV) Licensee, Inc.)
- Operator: Nexstar Media Group
- Sister stations: WMBD-TV

History
- First air date: October 18, 1982
- Former call signs: WBLN (1982–1985)
- Former channel numbers: Analog: 43 (UHF, 1982–2009)
- Former affiliations: Independent (1982–1986)

Technical information
- Licensing authority: FCC
- Facility ID: 5875
- ERP: 1,000 kW
- HAAT: 293 m (961 ft)
- Transmitter coordinates: 40°38′40.5″N 89°10′45.9″W

Links
- Public license information: Public file; LMS
- Website: www.centralillinoisproud.com

WYZZ-TV (channel 43) is a television station licensed to Bloomington, Illinois, United States, serving as the Fox affiliate for the Peoria area. It is owned by Cunningham Broadcasting and operated by Nexstar Media Group alongside CBS affiliate WMBD-TV (channel 31). The two stations share studios on North University Street in Peoria, with a secondary studio and news bureau on East Washington Street in Bloomington (which served as WYZZ's studios). WYZZ-TV's transmitter is located near Congerville, a village of Montgomery Township, Woodford County.

== History ==
The station signed on the air on October 18, 1982, as WBLN (standing for "What We Believe In") and aired an analog signal on UHF channel 43. It was founded by Grace Communications, a consortium of members of Peoria's Grace Presbyterian Church. Except for the call sign, it was unrelated to the old WBLN that broadcast on UHF channel 15 in the 1950s. The station first broadcast from studios located on East Empire Street/Illinois Route 9 in Bloomington. The station was a general entertainment independent and first new commercial outlet to sign-on since future sister WMBD hit the airwaves 24 years earlier. Grace Communications sold the station to Midwest Television Associates in 1983. It initially signed on at 9 a.m. running religious shows until noon and low budget and barter shows from noon to midnight. This would be a mix of cartoons, public domain movies, some drama shows, westerns, news from CNN, and exercise shows.

In 1984, the station began signing on at 7 a.m. and began running a block of cartoons from 7 to 9 weekday mornings. Midwest then sold WBLN to local businessman G. J. Robinson in 1985, who changed its call letters to the current WYZZ-TV in September 1985. The station slightly cut back the religious shows but also began running stronger programming such as more of-network sitcoms, both older and recent. On October 9, 1986, the station joined Fox as a charter affiliate. WYZZ later relocated its operations to a new facility located on East Lincoln Street in Bloomington and since has relocated again to 217 E. Washington St. The station would eventually be sold to Sinclair Broadcast Group in 1996.

On December 1, 2001, Sinclair and the Nexstar Broadcasting Group (owner of WMBD) entered into a local marketing agreement (LMA) in which WMBD would take over WYZZ's operations. As part of the deal, WYZZ abandoned its Bloomington studios and merged its operations into WMBD's facility in Peoria. In August 2005, a similar agreement would be established between Sinclair's WUHF and Nexstar's WROC-TV in Rochester, New York.

WYZZ broadcasts digitally on UHF channel 28 and (like most Sinclair-owned or -operated stations) has been digital-only since February 17, 2009. According to a post on The Peoria Chronicle website, WYZZ and WMBD were planning on terminating the LMA between the two effective April 1, 2010. This move was ultimately not followed through with. On May 15, 2012, Sinclair and Fox agreed to a five-year extension to the network's affiliation agreement with Sinclair's 19 Fox stations, including WYZZ, allowing them to continue carrying the network's programming until 2017.

Sinclair announced the acquisition of Barrington Broadcasting's stations, including WHOI, on February 28, 2013. On that date, Sinclair made public that it would transfer the WYZZ license (along with that of then-sister station WSYT in Syracuse, New York; it would later be dropped from the plan and sold separately) to Cunningham Broadcasting because the WHOI purchase would violate FCC regulations on duopoly ownership. However, nearly all of Cunningham Broadcasting's stock is controlled by trusts in the names of the principal owners of Sinclair. Thus, for all intents and purposes, Sinclair still owns WYZZ. Even with the nominal ownership change (the transaction was finalized on November 22), WMBD will continue to operate WYZZ for the time being.

WEEK-TV's joint sales and shared services agreements with WHOI were originally set to expire in March 2017. However, Sinclair announced that it would terminate the JSA/SSA with WEEK-TV within nine months after the consummation of its sale from Granite Broadcasting to Quincy Newspapers.

On December 3, 2018, Nexstar announced it would acquire the assets of Chicago-based Tribune Media for $6.4 billion in cash and debt. The deal—which would make Nexstar the largest television station operator by total number of stations upon its expected closure late in the third quarter of 2019—would result in the WYZZ/WMBD virtual duopoly gaining additional sister stations in nearby markets including Chicago (independent station WGN-TV) and St. Louis (Fox affiliate KTVI and CW affiliate KPLR-TV). (Ownership conflicts exist in two existing Nexstar markets involving Nexstar's duopoly of CW affiliate WISH-TV and MyNetworkTV affiliate WNDY-TV and Tribune's duopoly of Fox affiliate WXIN and CBS affiliate WTTV/WTTK in Indianapolis and Nexstar's virtual triopoly of CBS affiliate WHBF-TV, CW affiliate KGCW and Fox-affiliated SSA partner KLJB and Tribune-owned ABC affiliate WQAD-TV in the Quad Cities.)

== Newscasts ==
In April 2002, WMBD established a news share agreement with WYZZ, resulting in a prime time newscast on the Fox affiliate that was produced by WMBD, called Fox 43 News at 9. The thirty-minute broadcast was originally broadcast every night before being dropped from weekends at some point in time. The newscast did not have any competition in the time slot until June 5, 2006, when WEEK-TV added its own half-hour newscast at 9 on then-UPN affiliate WAOE (that was also seen solely on weeknights until the end of 2014).

On May 7, 2015, WMBD became the first television station in the market to produce local news in full high definition. On the same day, WYZZ's weeknight 9 p.m. newscast was included in the upgrade and rebranded as WYZZ News at 9 and WMBD also began producing a two-hour weekday morning show for the Fox affiliate called Good Day Central Illinois, airing from 7 to 9 a.m. In addition to its primary studios, it operates a Twin Cities Bureau on 217 East Washington Street in Bloomington.

== Subchannels ==
The station's signal is multiplexed:

Subchannels of WYZZ-TV
Subchannel	Res.	Short name	Programming
43.1	720p	WYZZ-DT	Fox
43.2	480i	Merit	MeTV Toons
43.3	480i	GetTV	Great
