= WBQD =

WBQD refers to the following broadcasting stations in the Quad Cities:

- WBQD-LP, a defunct television station (channel 26 analog/14 digital) licensed to Davenport, Iowa, United States, originally affiliated with UPN and later MyNetworkTV
- WQAD-DT3, the third digital subchannel of WQAD-TV (channel 38.3 digital/8.3 virtual) licensed to Moline, Illinois, United States, which was previously a simulcast of WBQD-LP and is currently the MyNetworkTV affiliate for the Quad Cities television market
