= WWXL =

WWXL may refer to:

- WWXL (Kentucky), a defunct radio station (1450 AM) formerly licensed to Manchester, Kentucky, United States, which operated from 1956 to 2026
- WWXL (Illinois), a defunct radio station (1590 AM) formerly licensed to Peoria, Illinois, United States, which used the call sign from 1947 to 1952
