= WTVK (TV) =

Television station in Oswego, Illinois

- Oswego–Chicago, Illinois; United States
- City: Oswego, Illinois (Note: Originally licensed to Peoria, Illinois; moved to Oswego in 2021.)
- Channels: Digital: 10 (VHF); Virtual: 59

Programming
- Affiliations: 59.1: Shop LC; for others, see § Subchannels

Ownership
- Owner: Venture Technologies Group; (Four Seasons Peoria, LLC)
- Sister stations: WRME-LD

History
- Founded: September 8, 1995
- First air date: July 5, 1999
- Former call signs: WAOE (1995–2023)
- Former channel numbers: Analog: 59 (UHF, 1999–2008); Digital: 39 (UHF, 2001–2020)
- Former affiliations: UPN (1999–2006); MyNetworkTV (2006–2020); Infomercials (2020–2026)
- Call sign meaning: "Television", K has no specific meaning

Technical information
- Licensing authority: FCC
- Facility ID: 52280
- ERP: DTS1: 30 kW; DTS2: 7.4 kW
- HAAT: DTS1: 411 m (1,348 ft); DTS2: 388 m (1,273 ft)
- Transmitter coordinates: DTS1: 41°16′54.6″N 88°56′11.1″W; DTS2: 41°53′56.1″N 87°37′23.2″W
- Translator(s): 18 (UHF) Pekin

Links
- Public license information: Public file; LMS

WTVK (channel 59) is a television station licensed to Oswego, Illinois, United States, serving the Chicago television market and primarily airing home shopping programming from Shop LC. Owned by Venture Technologies Group, it is a sister station to WRME-LD (channel 33). WTVK's official primary transmitter is located in Deer Park Township near Starved Rock State Park in LaSalle County, with its officially secondary, but de facto, main transmitter atop the John Hancock Center in downtown Chicago.

WTVK also operates a digital replacement translator on UHF channel 18, licensed to Pekin (with its transmitter on High Point Lane near East Peoria).

== History ==
Temporary logo featured in 2006 during transition from UPN to MyNetworkTV.

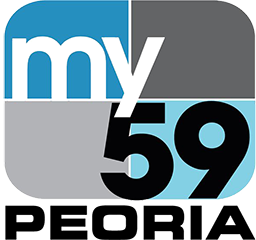
WAOE, My59 logo from 2006 to 2020.

Originally licensed to Peoria as WAOE, the station signed on the air on July 5, 1999, as a UPN affiliate and aired an analog signal on UHF channel 59. Its studios were located on Fulton Street in downtown Peoria. In its early months, the station broadcast at a low power; WAOE's signal would be upgraded in early 2000, allowing AT&T Cable to add the station to its lineup on February 22. Before WAOE's launch, then-ABC affiliate WHOI (channel 19) had a secondary affiliation with UPN.

On January 24, 2006, The WB and UPN announced the two networks would end broadcasting and merge to form The CW. On February 22, News Corporation announced it would start up another new network called MyNetworkTV. It was made public on March 15 that WAOE would become the market's MyNetworkTV outlet. Meanwhile, cable-only WB affiliate WBPE (operated by WHOI) became the area's CW station. To offer non-cable viewers access to The CW, WHOI added a new second digital subchannel to simulcast the new network. WAOE would officially join MyNetworkTV on September 5 while WHOI-DT2 started offering The CW 13 days later on September 18.

WAOE shut down its analog signal, over UHF channel 59, on December 1, 2008, approximately six months before the official date on which full-power television stations in the United States transitioned from analog to digital broadcasts under federal mandate. The station's digital signal remained on its pre-transition UHF channel 39, using virtual channel 59.

Until the end of 2014, WAOE was operated through a joint sales agreement by Granite Broadcasting, then-owner of NBC affiliate WEEK-TV (channel 25). It shared facilities with that station and WHOI (which was operated by WEEK-TV through a separate joint sales and shared services agreement). The Springfield Road studios of WEEK-TV and WHOI once handled some internal operations (such as the maintenance of programming logs) of another Four Seasons Broadcasting station, WBQD-LP; however, that station was actually controlled through a local marketing agreement with the Quad Cities' ABC affiliate WQAD-TV (owned at the time by Local TV; now owned by Tegna Inc.), and most of its operations were run from WQAD's studios in Moline. Quincy Newspapers announced on February 11, 2014, that it would acquire WEEK-TV from Granite Broadcasting. Quincy planned on continuing to provide services to WAOE, but the JSA with Granite expired at the end of 2014.

In the spring of 2020, WAOE moved its transmitter to the former site of WWTO-TV near Oglesby, using WWTO's former VHF digital channel 10. At that time, WAOE stopped carrying MyNetworkTV and syndicated shows and began carrying an all-infomercial format.

On November 27, WAOE filed an application to move its city of license to Oswego, Illinois, in Kendall County (part of the Chicago market).

On September 8, 2021, WAOE applied to convert to a distributed transmission system (DTS) with the addition of a second (and effectively, main) transmitter atop the John Hancock Center.

On March 31, 2023, the station changed its call sign to WTVK.

== Programming ==
=== Local programming ===
WTVK's local programming, branded as "VPOD TV", formerly broadcast on its third digital subchannel. It consisted mostly of talk shows, many of which covered holistic and alternative wellness. The channel's arrangement with then-WAOE ended at the end of 2022.

In 2021, VPOD TV held the broadcast rights to the Chicago Thanksgiving Parade, which previously aired on WGN-TV. The arrangement was heavily criticized as few Chicago households had any access to WAOE, and in 2022, the parade moved to Chicago-based WCIU-TV.

=== Sports programming ===
From 2015 to 2019, WAOE was the Peoria broadcast affiliate for Chicago Bulls, Blackhawks, and White Sox games produced by WGN Sports, and Cubs broadcasts produced by WLS-TV after WGN America stopped carrying national sports telecasts of Chicago teams. Before then, WAOE was an affiliate of the St. Louis Cardinals television network from St. Louis' KPLR-TV.

WAOE was also the longtime local broadcaster of the Illinois High School Association final tournaments and championships for basketball and football in Peoria. With WAOE's move out of the market, the telecasts moved to WEEK-DT3 in the fall of 2019.

=== Newscasts ===
On June 5, 2006, WEEK-TV established a news share agreement with WAOE and began producing a weeknight-only prime time newscast for the then-UPN affiliate. Known as Primetime News at Nine, the half-hour newscast competed with WYZZ-TV's half-hour newscast, produced by sister station WMBD-TV. WAOE also simulcast WEEK's morning news in full. In September 2006, the name was altered to News 25 at Nine on My59 to reflect WAOE's new affiliation. After the Granite JSA expired at the end of 2014, all WEEK-TV newscasts were dropped from WAOE.

== Subchannels ==
The station's signal is multiplexed:

Subchannels of WTVK
Subchannel	Res.	Short name	Programming
59.1	720p	WTVK-HD	Shop LC
59.2	480i	SBN	SonLife
59.3	480i	AceTV	Ace TV
59.4	720p	NTD	NTD America
