= WMBD-TV =

Television station in Peoria, Illinois

- Peoria–Bloomington–Normal, Illinois; United States
- City: Peoria, Illinois
- Channels: Digital: 26 (UHF); Virtual: 31
- Branding: WMBD

Programming
- Affiliations: 31.1: CBS; for others, see § Subchannels

Ownership
- Owner: Nexstar Media Group; (Nexstar Media Inc.)
- Sister stations: WYZZ-TV

History
- First air date: January 1, 1958
- Former channel numbers: Analog: 31 (UHF, 1958–2009); Digital: 30 (UHF, 2000–2020)
- Call sign meaning: Derived from WMBD radio, whose call sign was sequentially assigned (Note: Original WMBD radio owner Enos Kahler assigned the backronym "World's Most Beautiful Drive" in reference to a legend that former President Theodore Roosevelt lauded Grandview Drive during a visit to Peoria in 1910.)

Technical information
- Licensing authority: FCC
- Facility ID: 42121
- ERP: 822 kW
- HAAT: 192.4 m (631 ft)
- Transmitter coordinates: 40°38′6″N 89°32′19″W

Links
- Public license information: Public file; LMS
- Website: CIProud.com

WMBD-TV (channel 31) is a television station in Peoria, Illinois, United States, affiliated with CBS. It is owned by Nexstar Media Group and operated alongside Bloomington-licensed Fox affiliate WYZZ-TV (channel 43). The two stations share studios on North University Street in Peoria, with a secondary studio and news bureau on East Washington Street in Bloomington. WMBD-TV's transmitter is located on Pinecrest Drive in East Peoria, a section of Groveland Township, Tazewell County.

== History ==
The station signed on January 1, 1958, as the third television outlet in the Peoria market after WEEK-TV (channel 25) and WTVH (channel 19, now WHOI). Airing an analog signal on UHF channel 31, it was originally owned by Charles Caley and John Fetzer under the name WMBD, Inc., along with WMBD radio (1470 AM and 93.3 FM, now WPBG). WMBD radio had long been a CBS Radio Network affiliate, so naturally channel 31 took over the CBS television affiliation from WTVH. WMBD-TV shared its studios along with its radio sisters on the second level of what was then the Majestic Theatre.

Under the former ownership of the Peoria Broadcasting Company, WMBD had previously received a construction permit for VHF channel 6 on July 29, 1948; what would have been WMBT never signed on, despite vast sums spent on constructing television facilities, and the company turned in their construction permit to the FCC in September 1949 with no reason given.

The WMBD stations were sold to Midwest Television Incorporated of Champaign (owner of fellow CBS affiliate WCIA) in 1960 for $1.85 million. In addition to sharing resources with WCIA, WMBD has also carried some original programming from the former. In the early-1960s, WMBD was the first Peoria station to broadcast color television. Along with WEEK-TV, it maintained a repeater, W71AE (channel 71), in LaSalle in the 1960s and 1970s in order to expand its signal reach. The broadcast license for this low-power outlet was granted on November 15, 1962. A picture of W71AE's 485-foot (148 m) Rohn tower and its sixteen bay antenna is shown in a Rohn advertisement in the July 1, 1963, issue of Broadcasting.

WMBD moved to its current location on North University Street in June 1977 and still remains Peoria's only commercial television station with studios in the city itself. It became the area's first outlet to broadcast in stereo in September 1988. In 1999, Midwest Television sold controlling interest in its Illinois television stations to Nexstar. In 2001, Midwest sold its remaining interest in WMBD, WCIA and WCFN to Nexstar while the WMBD radio stations were sold to Triad Broadcasting.

On December 1 of that year, Nexstar and the Sinclair Broadcast Group entered into a local marketing agreement (LMA) in which WMBD took over WYZZ's operations. As part of the deal, WYZZ moved into WMBD's studios in Peoria. In August 2005, a similar agreement would be established between Nexstar's WROC-TV and Sinclair's WUHF in Rochester, New York. WMBD was the last station in the market to sign-on a digital signal and has been broadcasting digital-only since February 17, 2009.

On June 15, 2016, Nexstar announced that it has entered into an affiliation agreement with Katz Broadcasting for the Escape (now Ion Mystery), Laff, Grit, and Bounce TV networks (the last one of which is owned by Bounce Media LLC, whose COO Jonathan Katz is president/CEO of Katz Broadcasting), bringing one or more of the four networks to 81 stations owned and/or operated by Nexstar, including WMBD-TV.

On December 3, 2018, Nexstar announced it would acquire the assets of Chicago-based Tribune Media for $6.4 billion in cash and debt. The deal—which would make Nexstar the largest television station operator by total number of stations upon its expected closure late in the third quarter of 2019—would result in the WMBD/WYZZ virtual duopoly gaining additional sister stations in nearby markets including Chicago (independent station WGN-TV) and St. Louis (Fox affiliate KTVI and CW affiliate KPLR-TV). (Ownership conflicts exist in two existing Nexstar markets involving Nexstar's duopoly of CW affiliate WISH-TV and MyNetworkTV affiliate WNDY-TV and Tribune's duopoly of Fox affiliate WXIN and CBS affiliate WTTV/WTTK in Indianapolis and Nexstar's virtual triopoly of CBS affiliate WHBF-TV, CW affiliate KGCW and Fox-affiliated SSA partner KLJB and Tribune-owned ABC affiliate WQAD-TV in the Quad Cities.)

== Newscasts ==
WMBD presently broadcasts 43 hours of news each week (with 8 hours each weekday and an hour and a half each on Saturdays and Sundays). The station does not produce morning newscasts on weekends.

In April 2002, WMBD established a news share agreement with WYZZ. The arrangement resulted in the launch of a half-hour, prime time newscast on that station that was jointly produced by WMBD. Known as Fox 43 News at 9, the broadcast is seen every night. The show did not have any direct competition in the time slot until June 5, 2006, when WEEK-TV launched its own weeknight-only prime time newscast on then-UPN affiliate WAOE.

On March 2, 2009, WHOI consolidated its operations with WEEK-TV. As a result, there was a noticeable increase in viewership on WMBD since this left the market with only two unique news departments that cover the area.

On May 7, 2015, beginning with the weekday noon newscast, the station became the first broadcast television station in the market to produce local news in full high definition. On the same day, WYZZ's weeknight 9 p.m. newscast was included in the upgrade and the station also began producing a two-hour weekday morning show for the Fox affiliate. Known as Good Day Central Illinois, the program can be seen from 7 to 9 a.m. and offers a local alternative to the big three networks' morning programs. In addition to its primary studios, it operates a Twin Cities bureau on East Lincoln Street in Bloomington (that were WYZZ's studios prior to entering into a LMA with WMBD).

On January 6, 2019, WMBD received a new graphics package and adopted the "Aerial" theme.

=== Notable former personnel ===
- Cheryl Burton (1990) — later co-anchor on WLS-TV in Chicago
- Colleen Callahan — agribusiness reporter (1974–1997)
- John Coleman — weather anchor, later founded The Weather Channel then went to KUSI in San Diego; died in 2018
- Faith Daniels — later news anchor for the CBS Morning News and The Today Show
- Bob Jamieson — from Peoria; later at ABC News; Jamieson School in Peoria is named for his father
- Jim Jensen — later at WBZ-AM/FM/TV in Boston then main anchor at WCBS-TV in New York City; died in 1999
- Paul Moyer — later anchor at KNBC in Los Angeles
- Randy Salerno — also worked at WHOI in Peoria; later at WGN-TV then WBBM-TV in Chicago, died in 2008
- Martin Savidge — anchor; now at CNN
- Dave Snell — from Pekin; still on WMBD (AM) as Bradley Braves men's basketball announcer
- Bob Starr (1960s) — later a sports announcer in Boston, St. Louis, and Los Angeles (died in 1998)
- Lisa Sylvester — later ABC News and CNN correspondent; now at WPXI in Pittsburgh
- Anne Marie Tiernon — reporter (1989–1991; now at WTHR in Indianapolis)

== Subchannels ==
The station's signal is multiplexed:

Subchannels of WMBD-TV
Subchannel	Res.	Short name	Programming
31.1	1080i	WMBD	CBS
31.2	480i	Bounce	Bounce TV
31.3	480i	GRIT	Grit
31.4	480i	Mystery	Ion Mystery
