= WTVK =

WTVK may refer to:

- WTVK (TV), a television station (channel 10, virtual 59) licensed to serve Oswego, Illinois, United States
- WXCW, a television station (channel 32, virtual 46) licensed to serve Naples, Florida, United States, which held the call sign WTVK from 1995 to 2007
- WVLT-TV, a television station (channel 34, virtual 8) licensed to serve Knoxville, Tennessee, United States, which held the call sign WTVK or WTVK-TV from 1955 to 1988
