= WMWC-TV =

Television station in Galesburg, Illinois

- Galesburg–Moline–Rock Island, Illinois; Davenport–Bettendorf, Iowa; United States
- City: Galesburg, Illinois
- Channels: Digital: 8 (VHF); Virtual: 53

Programming
- Affiliations: 53.1: TBN; for others, see § Subchannels

Ownership
- Owner: Trinity Broadcasting Network; (Trinity Broadcasting of Texas, Inc.)

History
- Founded: July 20, 2007
- First air date: August 20, 2012
- Former call signs: WMWC (2012–2013)

Technical information
- Licensing authority: FCC
- Facility ID: 81946
- ERP: 23 kW
- HAAT: 330 m (1,083 ft)
- Transmitter coordinates: 41°18′44″N 90°22′46″W

Links
- Public license information: Public file; LMS
- Website: www.tbn.org

WMWC-TV (channel 53) is a religious television station licensed to Galesburg, Illinois, United States, serving the Quad Cities area. The station is owned by the Trinity Broadcasting Network (TBN). WMWC-TV's studios are located on 44th Avenue in Moline, and its transmitter is located in Orion, Illinois.

== History ==
WMWC originally planned to go on the air on September 1, 2001, as the UPN affiliate for the Quad Cities market. Although Northwest Television owned the station, operations were to have been handled by Second Generation of Iowa, owner of Fox affiliate KFXA in Cedar Rapids. However, Grant Broadcasting System II, then-owner of KLJB-TV and KGWB-TV, filed a petition to deny the application, and the construction permit was not granted until July 20, 2007—nearly a year after UPN (which affiliated with WBQD-LP in 2002) closed down.

WMWC never signed on an analog signal prior to June 12, 2009. As a result, when it took to the air on August 20, 2012, it became the first television station in the Quad Cities to have signed on as a digital-only station, more than three years after full-power stations ended analog broadcasts. On June 5, 2012, the station was assigned the call letters WMWC. A TBN affiliate from its sign-on, WMWC was acquired from Northwest Television by the network in December 2012. On June 13, 2013, TBN added the "-TV" suffix to the station's call sign.

== Technical information ==
=== Subchannels ===
The station's signal is multiplexed:

Subchannels of WMWC-TV
Channel	Res.	Short name	Programming
53.1	720p	TBN HD	TBN
53.2	720p	TVDEALS	Infomercials
53.3	480i	Inspire	TBN Inspire
53.4	480i	ONTV4U	OnTV4U (infomercials)
53.5	480i	POSITIV	Positiv

=== Analog-to-digital transition ===
Because it was granted an original construction permit after the FCC finalized the DTV allotment plan on April 21, 1997, the station did not receive a companion channel for a digital television station. Instead, at the end of the digital TV conversion period for full-service stations, WMWC would have been required to turn off its analog signal and turn on its digital signal (called a "flash-cut"). WMWC's original analog allocation was UHF channel 67, though the application was subsequently amended to specify digital operation on channel 53; however, both channels were removed from the TV bandplan at the end of the digital television transition in the United States. Since WQAD-TV elected to stay on its pre-transition digital UHF channel 38 allocation after the digital transition, Northwest Television, the original owners of WMWC, elected WQAD's former analog channel allocation, VHF channel 8, as the channel on which to broadcast WMWC's post-transition digital signal. As WQAD uses virtual channel 8 because of its former analog allocation, WMWC legally could not use it; the station instead uses virtual channel 53.

== See also ==
- WBQD-LP, the low power television station which ultimately ended up with the UPN affiliation for the Quad Cities market, and later became the area's MyNetworkTV affiliate; station is now defunct
- WQAD-DT3, the third digital subchannel of WQAD-TV which was previously a simulcast of WBQD-LP and is now the MyNetworkTV affiliate for the Quad Cities television market
- WQAD-TV, the ABC affiliate for the Quad Cities television market and the parent station of WQAD-DT3; also the former analog occupant of the VHF channel 8 allocation in the Quad Cities area
