= WHOI =

WHOI may refer to:

- Woods Hole Oceanographic Institution, a research and graduate degree educational institute in Massachusetts
- WHOI (TV), a television station (channel 24, virtual 19) licensed to Peoria, Illinois, United States
