= Maggie Vespa =

American journalist

- Occupation: Journalist

Maggie Vespa is an American journalist and a correspondent for NBC News. Before being hired by NBC, she had worked at KGW, the NBC affiliate station in Portland, Oregon, from 2014 to 2022, and had previously worked for KGUN, in Tucson, Arizona, and at WEEK/WHOI in Peoria, Illinois.

== Personal ==
Vespa grew up in Peoria, Illinois, and graduated from Dunlap High School. She later graduated from the University of Illinois. In the 1970s, her mother, Kay Vespa, worked as a reporter and anchorperson for a Peoria television station.
