= WBQD-LP =

Television station in Davenport, Iowa (2002–2011)

- Davenport–Bettendorf, Iowa; Rock Island–Moline, Illinois; United States
- City: Davenport, Iowa
- Channels: Analog: 26 (UHF); Digital: 14 (UHF) (CP; never built)
- Branding: My TV 16 (cable channel)

Programming
- Affiliations: UPN (2002–2006); MyNetworkTV (2006–2011)

Ownership
- Owner: Four Seasons Broadcasting; (Four Seasons Peoria, LLC)
- Operator: WQAD-TV: (NYTCO, 2004–2007); (Local TV LLC, 2007–2011)
- Sister stations: WQAD-TV

History
- Founded: March 8, 1995
- First air date: February 4, 2002
- Last air date: December 9, 2011 (9 years, 308 days)

Technical information
- Facility ID: 70777
- Class: LP
- ERP: 26 kW
- HAAT: 221 m (725 ft)
- Transmitter coordinates: 41°28′28.98″N 90°26′44.99″W
- Translator(s): WQAD-DT 8.3 (38.3 UHF) Moline, IL

WBQD-LP (channel 26) was a low-power television station licensed to Davenport, Iowa, United States, which operated from 2002 to 2011. Last owned by Four Seasons Broadcasting (a partnership between Cleveland-based Malibu Broadcasting and Los Angeles–based Venture Technologies Group, LLC), it was affiliated with UPN and MyNetworkTV. The station was operated under a local marketing agreement (LMA), and a technical services agreement by The New York Times Company, and later by Local TV LLC, as a sister station to Moline, Illinois–licensed ABC affiliate WQAD-TV (channel 8). WBQD-LP's operations were housed at WQAD-TV's studios on Park 16th Street in the Prospect Park section of Moline; its transmitter was located on 70th Street, next to Black Hawk College, near Moline's Poplar Grove neighborhood.

Upon going silent in December 2011, WBQD-LP was the second-to-last television station in the Quad Cities market to broadcast an analog signal, having been surpassed only by 3ABN translator station K16EL (now K20KF-D) which flash cut to digital operations in September 2012.

== History ==
Northwest Television, the original owner of Galesburg, Illinois–licensed WMWC-TV, had applied for a license to broadcast on channel 53 and had planned to sign on September 1, 2001, as the UPN affiliate for the Quad Cities television market, with operations for the proposed station to be handled by Second Generation of Iowa, owner of KFXA in Cedar Rapids. However, the application for the new station was challenged by Grant Broadcasting System II, then-owner of KLJB-TV and KGWB-TV. In December 2001 after receiving permission to begin broadcasting on UHF channel 26, this station began transmitter tests and on February 4, 2002, signed on as WBQD-LP with the UPN affiliation that was originally to have gone to WMWC.

Four Seasons Broadcasting initially operated WBQD outright from 2002 to 2004. In November 2004, it was announced that WBQD would enter into a joint sales agreement with WQAD, then owned by The New York Times Company; On September 5, 2006, WBQD became a MyNetworkTV affiliate. It adopted the nickname "My TV 16" in reference to its channel number on Mediacom. Local TV LLC would acquire the NYT stations, including WQAD and the agreement with WBQD, in 2007. Some internal operations of WBQD (such as the maintenance of program logs) were handled at facilities of Four Seasons-owned WAOE in Peoria, Illinois, itself housed at East Peoria facilities of WHOI and WEEK-TV. During the overnight hours, WBQD aired paid programming from Corner Store TV.

WBQD's over-the-air signal only covered the immediate Quad Cities area due to its low-power status, but most viewers watched the station via its simulcast on WQAD's third digital subchannel, which covers the entire market. It also shared its analog channel allocation with KGWB (which was licensed to and transmitted from Burlington, Iowa, to the south), an unusual arrangement for a low-power and full-power station in the same general television market. The station had a construction permit for a low-power digital transmitter on VHF channel 7 with the calls WBQD-LD.

However, on June 30, 2009, Four Seasons Broadcasting filed for digital displacement relief and requested to move its digital channel assignment to UHF channel 14 instead. After an engineering study, it was determined that even as a low-power digital station, WBQD would cause and/or receive more than acceptable interference to and from KWWL in Waterloo, Iowa, and KHQA-TV in Hannibal, Missouri, both of which are full power digital television stations that broadcast on channel 7 and had "flash-cut" to their former analog channels after the digital transition.

On December 9, 2011, WBQD-LP notified the Federal Communications Commission (FCC) that they went silent after losing their tower lease on the Black Hawk College campus in Moline. On June 6, 2013, the FCC canceled the license of WBQD-LP, after being off the air for over a year. After WBQD's closure, WQAD, which had for years been simulcasting WBQD on its third digital subchannel, began programming channel 8.3; it retained the MyNetworkTV affiliation and inherited WBQD's cable carriage, though it was rebranded "My TV 8.3". On October 9, 2012, the cable channel assignment for WQAD-DT3 on Mediacom moved from channel 16 to channel 3.

WMWC-TV was eventually granted its construction permit on July 20, 2007, and it finally signed on in August 2012 as a religious station affiliated with TBN. Since December 2012, WMWC has been owned and operated by TBN.

== See also ==
- WMWC-TV, the original "proposed" UPN affiliate for the Quad Cities market, now a religious station affiliated with TBN
- WQAD-DT3, the successor of WBQD-LP and the current MyNetworkTV affiliate for the Quad Cities market
- WTVK, WBQD's sister station in Peoria, also a former UPN and MyNetworkTV affiliate

Preceded by None	MyNetworkTV affiliate for the Quad Cities Television Market; 2006–2011	Succeeded by WQAD-DT3
