= WEEK-TV =

Television station in Peoria, Illinois

- Peoria–Bloomington–Normal, Illinois; United States
- City: Peoria, Illinois
- Channels: Digital: 25 (UHF); Virtual: 25
- Branding: WEEK (general; letters spelled out); Heart of Illinois ABC (25.2); Peoria-Bloomington CW (25.3); 25 News (newscasts)

Programming
- Affiliations: 25.1: NBC; 25.2: ABC; 25.3: CW+; 25.4: Ion

Ownership
- Owner: Gray Media; (Gray Television Licensee, LLC)
- Sister stations: WHOI

History
- First air date: February 1, 1953
- Former channel numbers: Analog: 43 (UHF, 1953–1964), 25 (UHF, 1964–2009); Digital: 57 (UHF, 2001–2009)
- Former affiliations: MyNetworkTV (25.2 secondary, 2023–2025)
- Call sign meaning: Derived from former sister station WEEK (AM) (now WOAM)

Technical information
- Licensing authority: FCC
- Facility ID: 24801
- ERP: 246 kW
- HAAT: 211.6 m (694 ft)
- Transmitter coordinates: 40°37′46″N 89°32′53″W

Links
- Public license information: Public file; LMS
- Website: www.25newsnow.com

WEEK-TV (channel 25) is a television station licensed to Peoria, Illinois, United States, affiliated with NBC, ABC, and The CW Plus. It is owned by Gray Media alongside WHOI (channel 19), an independent station with MyNetworkTV. The two stations share studios and transmitter facilities on Springfield Road (along I-474) in East Peoria, a section of Groveland Township, Tazewell County.

WEEK-TV began broadcasting on February 1, 1953, originally on channel 43. Originally owned by the Oklahoma Publishing Company alongside WEEK (1350 AM), it has been an NBC affiliate since its start. The station moved to channel 25 in 1964 and had several owners, including Kansas City Southern Industries, Price Communications, and Granite Broadcasting Corporation.

In 2009, WEEK-TV began programming WHOI, then Peoria's affiliate of ABC and The CW, under agreements with Sinclair Broadcast Group; the news departments of the two stations were consolidated at WEEK's studios with separate broadcasts. The arrangements were ended in 2016, when then-owner Quincy Newspapers bought the ABC and CW affiliations from Sinclair and moved them onto a subchannel of WEEK. Gray Television bought Quincy in 2020 and two years later combined all remaining newscasts between the NBC and ABC subchannels.

== History ==
WEEK-TV began transmitting on February 1, 1953, with a signal on UHF channel 43. It has always been an NBC affiliate. It was owned and operated by the Oklahoma City–based Oklahoma Publishing Company along with WEEK radio (1350 AM now WOAM) through its broadcasting subsidiary, West Central Broadcasting Company. Edward K. Gaylord was president, and the chairman of the board was United States Senator, former governor of Oklahoma and founder of the Kerr-McGee Corporation Robert S. Kerr. Wayne Lovely, the first chief engineer of WEEK-AM-TV, supervised the construction of the stations' technical facilities and equipment installation in 1953. He remained with the station until 1974.

On November 7, 1957, WEEQ-TV in La Salle launched as a full-time satellite of WEEK-TV with the aim of increasing its signal reach. The UHF channel 35 allocation was most recently used for Trinity Broadcasting Network (TBN) affiliate WWTO-TV, which later broadcast digitally on very high frequency (VHF) channel 10, retaining virtual channel 35.

On September 1, 1963, the Federal Communications Commission (FCC) granted WEEK-TV authorization to move to channel 25. The channel was originally granted to the owners of radio station WIRL in 1957 as compensation after the sole VHF assignment there, channel 8, was moved to the Quad Cities region; the FCC moved to cancel the channel 25 construction permit in 1963, citing inactivity while WIRL was focused on its appeals regarding the channel 8 case. After delays in the delivery of the new antenna pushed back the channel move, WEEK-TV began broadcasting on channel 25 on October 16, 1964. The channel 43 allocation was later moved from Peoria to Bloomington and used by the second incarnation of WBLN starting in 1982 (now Fox affiliate WYZZ-TV).

OPUBCO sold the radio station in 1960, but retained the television stations until 1966, when it sold them to Kansas City Southern Industries. This was around the same time that Kansas City Southern acquired KRCG in Jefferson City, Missouri. The owners shut down WEEQ-TV on August 12, 1972, citing cable penetration in the La Salle/Streator area and WEEK-TV's improved signal.

In 1985, Kansas City Southern Industries sold both its stations to Price Communications. On October 31, 1988, WEEK-TV and fellow NBC outlet KBJR-TV of Superior, Wisconsin, became the two founding stations of the Granite Broadcasting Corporation. In 1997, WEEK-TV bought the broadcasting license for 98.5 in Eureka, giving it the call sign WEEK-FM and the nickname "Oldies 98.5". Granite Broadcasting divested itself of the radio station, now WPIA, in 1999. WEEK has broadcast exclusively in digital since February 17, 2009.

On March 2, 2009, WEEK-TV took over operations of rival WHOI, then owned by Barrington Broadcasting, through joint sales and shared services agreements. This resulted in WHOI closing its longtime studios on North Stewart Street in Creve Coeur and sharing WEEK-TV's East Peoria facility. As a result of the consolidation, all five of Peoria's full-powered commercial television stations are now operated by two entities. Granite-owned CBS affiliate WTVH in Syracuse, New York, (WHOI's original call letters) also saw its operations merge with Barrington-owned NBC affiliate WSTM-TV and low-powered CW affiliate WSTQ-LP the same day. WSTM, however, is the senior partner in the arrangement with WTVH.

=== Sale to Quincy ===
On February 11, 2014, Quincy-based Quincy Newspapers announced it would acquire WEEK-TV; KBJR-TV; WBNG-TV in Binghamton, New York; and Malara Broadcasting-owned WPTA in Fort Wayne, Indiana, from Granite Broadcasting. Quincy initially intended to provide continued services to WHOI, but Sinclair (having just completed its acquisition of Barrington Broadcasting in November 2013) gave notice that the JSA/SSA between WHOI and WEEK-TV, originally set to expire in March 2017, would be terminated within nine months of the completion of Quincy's purchase of WEEK-TV. On September 30, 2015, the FCC approved Quincy's purchase of WEEK, and the sale was completed on November 2, nearly two years after the agreement was announced.

Through a separate joint sales agreement, WEEK-TV also controlled the market's MyNetworkTV outlet WAOE through the end of 2014. The station, owned by Four Seasons Broadcasting, was then based out of the Springfield Road studios. For a time, the facility also hosted some internal operations (e.g. programming log maintenance) for WBQD-LP, another Four Seasons-owned MyNetworkTV outlet (now WQAD-DT3). The station was controlled through a local marketing agreement with the Quad Cities' ABC affiliate, WQAD-TV (then owned by Local TV; currently owned by Tegna Inc.), maintaining the majority of day-to-day operations in the big three affiliate's studios in Moline, Illinois.

=== Sale to Gray Television ===
On February 1, 2021, Gray Television announced that it had entered into an agreement to acquire most of Quincy Media's television properties for $925 million in a cash transaction. The acquisition was completed on August 2, 2021, bringing WEEK-TV under common ownership with several Gray Television stations in nearby midwestern markets.

== Subchannel history ==
=== WEEK-DT2 ===
WEEK-DT2 is the ABC-affiliated second digital subchannel of WEEK-TV, broadcasting in 720p high definition on channel 25.2.

==== History ====
WEEK-DT2 was launched on November 15, 2004, as an affiliate of NBC Weather Plus, a 24-hour weather channel that provides local forecasts for certain areas. In December 2008, after NBC Weather Plus shut down, it affiliated with The Local AccuWeather Channel, and continued to do so until it went silent in 2014, thus ending the subchannel's run as a 24/7 weather affiliate.

On July 26, 2016, Quincy Media announced that it had acquired WHOI's ABC and CW affiliations from Sinclair, and would consolidate them onto subchannels of WEEK beginning August 1, 2016. As an aspect of this deal, Quincy-owned WSJV in South Bend similarly relinquished its Fox affiliation to Sinclair-owned WSBT-TV. With that, WEEK-DT2 returned to the air as an ABC affiliate. The ABC and CW subchannels were simulcast on WHOI for 60 days following the consolidation. The JSA between WHOI and WEEK, which had been running since March 2009, was terminated on October 1, 2016, at which point WHOI moved its Comet affiliation from its 19.3 subchannel to its main 19.1 channel, thereby taking the 19.2 and 19.3 subchannels dark, and WEEK-DT2 became the sole ABC affiliate for the Peoria television market. Originally, WEEK-DT2 carried the "HOI ABC" branding. In October 2017, WEEK-DT2 lengthened its branding to "Heart of Illinois ABC".

From 2023 to 2025, the subchannel carried MyNetworkTV programming in overnight hours, airing Tuesday through Saturday mornings from 12:30 to 2:30 a.m., returning the service to the market again after WAOE stopped carrying it in 2020 upon its relocation into the Chicago market. In 2025, MyNetworkTV moved to WHOI as part of its new sports-oriented "MyTeam" format.

=== WEEK-DT3 ===
WEEK-DT3 is the CW-affiliated third digital subchannel of WEEK-TV, broadcasting in 720p high definition on channel 25.3. All programming on WEEK-DT3 is received through The CW's programming feed for smaller media markets, The CW Plus, which provides a set schedule of syndicated programming acquired by The CW for broadcast during time periods outside of the network's regular programming hours; however, Gray Television handles local advertising and promotional services for the subchannel. WEEK-DT3 also carries coverage of the Illinois High School Association's football championship games and boys' and girls' basketball tournaments as part of the IHSA's statewide network.

== News operation ==
=== Main channel ===
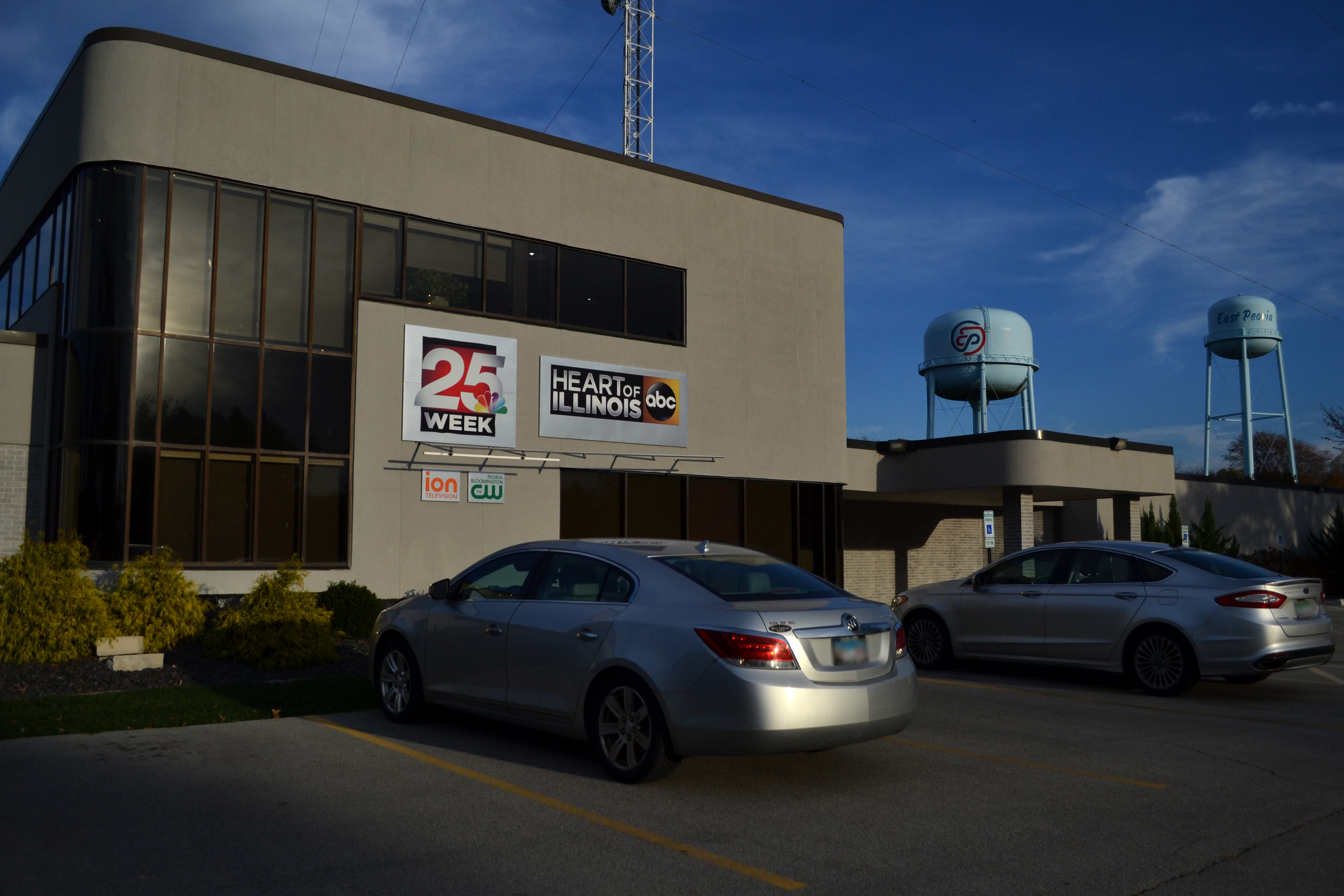
WEEK TV Station, East Peoria, 2023

On June 5, 2006, WEEK-TV established a news share agreement with WAOE. The arrangement resulted in this station debuting a weeknight-only prime time newscast on the then-UPN affiliate. Known as Primetime News at Nine (later known as News 25 at Nine on My59), the show could be seen for thirty minutes and offered competition to another weeknight half-hour production airing at the same time on WYZZ (produced by CBS affiliate WMBD-TV). WYZZ once aired a weekend edition of its newscast but this was dropped at some point in time. WAOE also provided a simulcast of WEEK-TV's weekday morning show (except for the first thirty-minute portion at 4:30 a.m.). After the JSA expired at the end of 2014, all WEEK-TV newscasts were dropped from WAOE.

In March 2009, after becoming operated by WEEK-TV, WHOI shut down its separate news department and merged it with the NBC outlet. A new secondary set was built at the Springfield Road studios for use by WHOI to produce separate newscasts. That station let go of most of its production and newscast personnel but added four on-air personalities to WEEK-TV's news team—three of whom are still employed by WEEK-TV today. WHOI dropped its own weeknight newscasts at 5 and 6 p.m. for a new show seen at 5:30 p.m. so it would not directly compete with WEEK-TV's own programs in those time slots. Until 2016, WHOI continued to produce a separate weekday morning show (the two anchors for that program did not appear on WEEK-TV) and a weeknight newscast at 10 p.m.

For many years on weekends, WEEK-TV and WHOI simulcast local news but there could have been a delay or preemption on one station because of network obligations (most notably sports programming). At some point after combining operations, the two outlets became the first news department in the market to upgrade local newscast production to 16:9 enhanced definition widescreen. That would be the case for the next several years. Although not truly high definition, the shows matched the aspect ratio of HD television screens.

=== WEEK-DT2 (Heart of Illinois ABC) ===
From August 1 to September 30, 2016, WEEK-DT2 simulcast WHOI's newscasts as HOI 19 News.

When the JSA between WHOI and WEEK-TV was terminated on October 1, Quincy Media transferred the newscasts from WHOI to the new ABC subchannel. The newscasts were then rebranded as HOI News (the branding that WHOI formerly used for its newscasts). WEEK-TV's main channel had upgraded local news production to high definition two months earlier, but initially, HOI ABC's newscasts carried over the 16:9 enhanced definition widescreen format that had been used by WHOI's news production years after it combined operations with WEEK-TV.

In October 2017, the subchannel upgraded its newscasts to full HD. The newscasts were rebranded as Heart of Illinois ABC News along with a new secondary set, music, and graphics package.

Gray Television announced in July 2022 that WEEK-DT2's news operation would be combined with WEEK-DT1, with the Heart of Illinois ABC News name being retired and all personnel and newscasts from Heart of Illinois ABC being moved to 25 News, to prevent the two subchannels from competing against each other. Some newscasts are simulcast on both subchannels.

== Technical information ==
=== Subchannels ===
The station's signal is multiplexed:

Subchannels of WEEK-TV
Subchannel	Res.	Short name	Programming
25.1	1080i	WEEKDT	NBC
25.2	720p	WEEKABC	ABC
25.3	720p	WEEKCW	The CW Plus
25.4	480i	WEEKION	Ion
