= Ian Gardeck =

American baseball pitcher (born 1990)

- Pitcher
- Born: November 21, 1990 (age 34); Park Ridge, Illinois, U.S.
- Bats: Right Throws: Right

Ian James Gardeck (born November 21, 1990) is an American former professional baseball pitcher. He was drafted by the San Francisco Giants in the 16th round of the 2012 Major League Baseball draft.

== Career ==
Gardeck graduated from Crystal Lake South High School in Crystal Lake, Illinois. He began his college baseball career at the University of Dayton, before transferring to Angelina College for his sophomore year. After the 2011 season, he played collegiate summer baseball with the Falmouth Commodores of the Cape Cod Baseball League. The Chicago White Sox selected Gardeck in the eighth round, with the 261st overall selection, of the 2011 MLB draft, but Gardeck instead transferred to the University of Alabama to continue his college career.

=== San Francisco Giants ===
The San Francisco Giants selected Gardeck in the 16th round of the 2012 Major League Baseball draft, and he signed with the Giants on June 12, 2012. Gardeck made his professional debut with the Low–A Salem-Keizer Volcanoes, posting a 2-2 record and 4.20 ERA in 19 games. In 2013, Gardeck played for the Single-A Augusta GreenJackets, recording a 4-3 record and 3.21 ERA with 66 strikeouts in 56 innings of work. The following season, he split the year between Salem-Keizer and the High-A San Jose Giants, struggling to a 3-3 record and 6.99 ERA in 29 combined appearances. Gardeck returned to San Jose for the 2015 season and pitched to a 3-4 record and 3.54 ERA with 104 strikeouts in 86 1/3 innings pitched across 61 games.

On November 20, 2015, the Giants added Gardeck to their 40-man roster to protect him from the Rule 5 draft. On March 14, 2016, it was announced that Gardeck would require Tommy John surgery, ending his 2016 season. On April 30, Gardeck was placed on release waivers by San Francisco. Gardeck re–signed with the team on a minor league contract on May 3. On November 7, 2016, Gardeck was re-added to San Francisco's 40-man roster. On April 2, 2017, Gardeck was designated for assignment by the Giants. He was released by the Giants on April 4, but re-signed with the team on a minor league contract on April 6. Gardeck missed the entire 2017 season after having a second straight Tommy John surgery, as well as surgery to repair his right labrum and femur head. In 2018, after rehabbing with the Arizona League Giants, Gardeck split the remainder of the season with San Jose and the Double–A Richmond Flying Squirrels, accumulating a 2.63 ERA in 14 appearances on the year.

=== Tampa Bay Rays ===
On December 13, 2018, the Tampa Bay Rays selected Gardeck from the Giants in the minor league phase of the Rule 5 draft. He was assigned to the Double–A Montgomery Biscuits and placed on the injured list to begin the 2019 season. Gardeck split the year between the Gulf Coast League Rays, High–A Charlotte Stone Crabs, and Montgomery, pitching to a 2–1 record and 1.96 ERA in 21 appearances between the three teams. On November 4, 2019, Gardeck elected free agency.

=== Oakland Athletics ===
On November 19, 2019, Gardeck signed a minor league contract with the Oakland Athletics organization that included an invitation to spring training. Gardeck did not play in a game in 2020 due to the cancellation of the minor league season because of the COVID-19 pandemic. On November 2, 2020, Gardeck elected free agency.

On December 4, 2020, Gardeck announced his retirement from professional baseball, stating "It broke my body for the last time", citing a shoulder injury he suffered during spring.

== Personal life ==
Gardeck's brother, Dennis, is a professional football player for the Jacksonville Jaguars.
