= GoNetSpeed =

Telecommunications holding company

GoNetspeed
- Type: Private
- Traded as: Nasdaq: OTEL
- Industry: Telecommunications
- Founded: 1920; 106 years ago
- Headquarters: Oneonta, Alabama, United States
- Services: Fixed line telephone service, Internet access, Cable television
- Owner: Oak Hill Capital Partners
- Subsidiaries: War Telephone; Granby Telephone and Telegraph Company
- Website: www.gonetspeed.com

GoNetspeed, formerly OTELCO, Inc. is a telecommunications holding company based in Oneonta, Alabama. The company owns small, independent telephone companies in West Virginia, Missouri, Maine, Massachusetts, Vermont, and Alabama. Its services include local and long-distance telephone, network access, cable television and other related services. The company was publicly traded on NASDAQ until 2021 when it was acquired by private equity firm Oak Hill Capital Partners for $40.6 million.

In 2013, the company filed for Chapter 11 bankruptcy protection after it lost a revenue generating contract from Time Warner Cable.

The company owns:

- Brindlee Mountain Telephone Company - Arab, Alabama
- Granby Telephone & Telegraph - Granby, Massachusetts
- Mid-Maine Communications - Bangor, Maine
- Mid-Missouri Telephone - Pilot Grove, Missouri
- Pine Tree Telephone & Telegraph - Gray and New Gloucester, Maine
- Saco River Telephone & Telegraph - Waterboro, West Buxton, and Bar Mills, Maine
- Shoreham Telephone Company - Shoreham, Vermont
- War Telephone - McDowell County, West Virginia
- Oneonta Telephone Company - Oneonta, Alabama

The company's subsidiaries do business as OTELCO.

As of April 27, 2022, the company rebranded as GoNetspeed to represent their focus on providing fiber internet.
