= WWXL (Kentucky) =

- Manchester, Kentucky; United States
- Broadcast area: Clay, Laurel, Knox, Bell, Leslie, Owsley, Whitley, southeastern Rockcastle, Perry, and Jackson counties
- Frequency: 1450 kHz
- Branding: Sports Talk 1450

Programming
- Format: Sports

History
- First air date: November 1956
- Last air date: 2026

Technical information
- Licensing authority: FCC
- Facility ID: 72441
- Class: C
- Power: 1,000 watts
- Transmitter coordinates: 37°09′10.30″N 83°46′08.70″W

Links
- Public license information: Public file; LMS

WWXL (1450 AM) was a radio station licensed to Manchester, Kentucky, broadcasting with a full-time signal of 1,000 watts.

The station had broadcast from studios at 103 Third Street in downtown Manchester.

== History ==
Established in 1956 under origunal ownership by Wilderness Road Broadcasting, WWXL was Clay County's oldest radio station, with Rev. Clifford Spurlock as it's manager until 1958. The station was originally a daytime-only service assigned to 1580 kHz; it was transferred to 1450 kHz, and becoming a 24-hour operation with 250 watts in 1958; power increased to 1,000 watts in 1959. The station signed on its FM counterpart, WEXL-FM (103.1 MHz, now WWLT) in August 1967.

By the early 1980s, the station was broadcasting a Country music format. In 1987, after being purchased by Vernon Baldwin, the station began broadcasting a Christian radio format to match with Baldwin's other radio stations in Kentucky and Ohio.

The Federal Communications Commission cancelled the station's license on October 1, 2026.

== History of call letters ==
The call letters WWXL previously were assigned to an AM station in Peoria, Illinois. It began broadcasting May 24, 1948, on 1590 kHz with 1 kW power (full-time).
