= Granby Telephone & Telegraph =

Massachusetts telecommunications provider

The Granby Telephone and Telegraph Co. of Mass.
- Company type: Private (Subsidiary of GoNetSpeed)
- Industry: Telecommunications
- Founded: 1903
- Headquarters: United States
- Services: Fixed line telephone services
- Parent: GoNetSpeed
- Website: ottcommunications.com

The Granby Telephone and Telegraph Co. of Mass. is an independent local telephone and internet service provider located in Western Massachusetts. The company is owned by GoNetSpeed and does business as OTT Communications.

In 2013, the company's parent company, Otelco, filed for Chapter 11 bankruptcy protection after it lost a revenue generating contract from Time Warner Cable.
