= Anne Marie Tiernon =

American journalist

Anne Marie Tiernon is an American journalist. She currently anchors at NBC affiliate WTHR in Indianapolis, Indiana, alongside Scott Swan at 5:30 p.m.

== Early years ==
Tiernon graduated from Indiana University with a bachelor's degree in business and from Northwestern University with a master's degree in journalism.

== Career ==
Tiernon started her career at WMBD-TV 31 in Peoria, Illinois, in 1989. Then in 1991, she headed to Indianapolis where she began reporting for WISH-TV's 11 p.m. newscast and anchored the CBS affiliate's 5:30 p.m. newscast, with colleague Scott Swan. From 2000 to 2004, Tiernon was a news anchor at WLWT-TV in Cincinnati, Ohio, as the anchor of the 5, 6, and 11 p.m. newscasts, alongside veteran anchor Dave Wagner. Since 2004, Tiernon has been at WTHR-TV in Indianapolis, Indiana, where she co-anchors the NBC affiliate's newscasts at 5:30 and 6 p.m..

== Personal life ==
Tiernon, a Fort Wayne, Indiana, native, is married to marketing executive Terry Tiernon. They have three children, 2 girls and 1 boy.
