= Trevor Keegan =

American football player (born 2000)

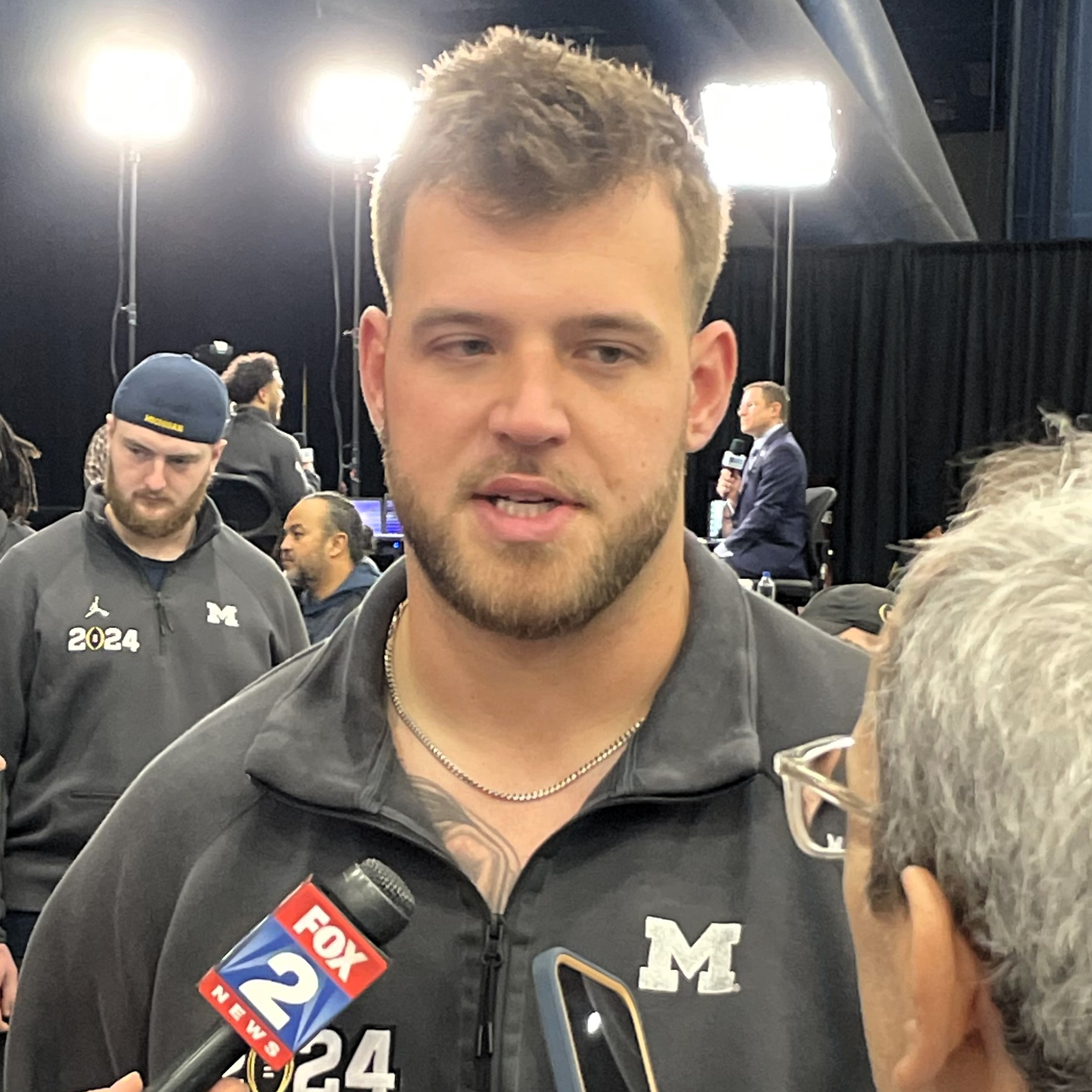
- Keegan with the Michigan Wolverines in 2024

No. 64 – Tampa Bay Buccaneers
- Position: Guard
- Roster status: Active

Personal information
- Born: August 30, 2000 (age 26); Crystal Lake, Illinois, U.S.
- Listed height: 6 ft 6 in (1.98 m)
- Listed weight: 315 lb (143 kg)

Career information
- High school: Crystal Lake South
- College: Michigan (2019–2023)
- NFL draft: 2024: 5th round, 172nd overall pick

Career history
- Philadelphia Eagles (2024); Dallas Cowboys (2025); Minnesota Vikings (2026); Tampa Bay Buccaneers (2026–present)

Awards and highlights
- Super Bowl champion (LIX); CFP national champion (2023); First-team All-Big Ten (2022); Second-team All-Big Ten (2023)

Career NFL statistics as of Week 8, 2026
- Games played: 10
- Stats at Pro Football Reference

Trevor Keegan (born August 30, 2000) is an American professional football guard for the Tampa Bay Buccaneers of the National Football League (NFL). He played college football for the Michigan Wolverines, winning three consecutive Big Ten Conference titles and a national championship in 2023. Keegan was twice named to the All-Big Ten team. He was selected by the Philadelphia Eagles in the fifth round of the 2024 NFL draft.

== Early life ==
Keegan was born on August 30, 2000, the son of Mike and Amanda Keegan, and attended Crystal Lake South High School in Crystal Lake, Illinois. He was a two-time Illinois High School Football Coaches Association Class 6A All-State performer, 2017 and 2018, and rated as the best recruit in Illinois, receiving scholarship offers from multiple schools, including Georgia, Penn State, and Michigan. He committed to play at the University of Michigan in December 2018.

== College career ==
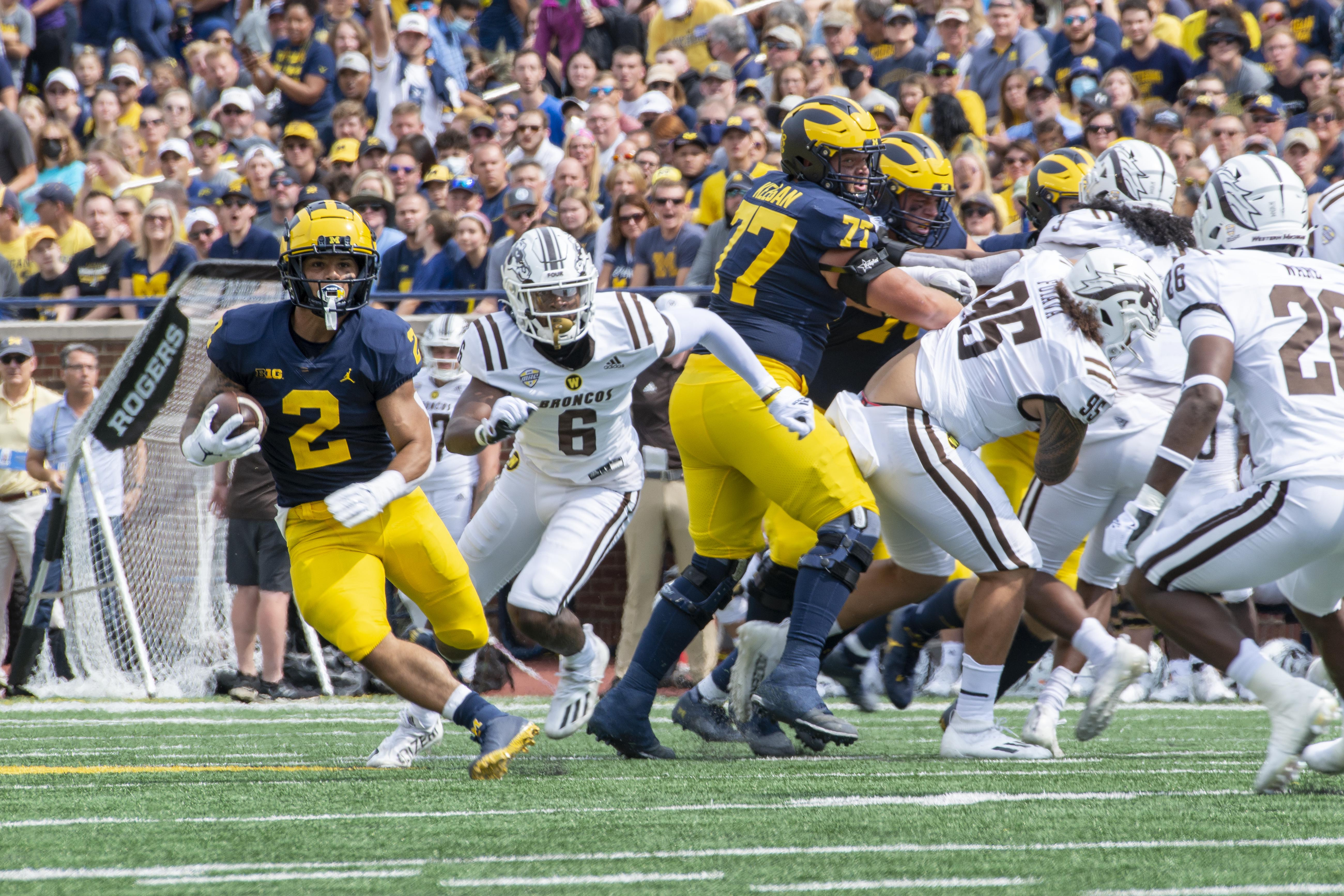
Keegan (#77) blocking for Blake Corum (#2) in 2021.

Keegan enrolled at the University of Michigan in 2019, but did not appear in any games. As a sophomore in 2020, he played five games on special teams and two on the offensive line.

As a junior in 2021, Keegan started 11 games (including the Orange Bowl) at left guard and was part of Michigan's offensive line that won the Joe Moore Award.

Prior to the 2022 season, Keegan lost approximately 30 pounds, going from 340–343 pounds to 303–305 pounds. As a senior, he started at left guard in 11 games. At the end of the 2022 season, Keegan was selected by the conference coaches and media as a first-team offensive guard on the All-Big Ten team. All three of Michigan's interior offensive lineman (Keegan, Olusegun Oluwatimi, and Zak Zinter) were named to the first team by the conference coaches. Keegan also won back-to-back Joe Moore Awards in 2022.

In 2023, Keegan returned for a 5th season, and started all 15 games as Michigan won a national championship. Keegan was named All-Big Ten for a second consecutive season.

== Professional career ==
Pre-draft measurables
Height	Weight	Arm length	Hand span	Wingspan	40-yard dash	10-yard split	20-yard split	20-yard shuttle	Three-cone drill	Vertical jump	Broad jump
6 ft 5 3/8 in (1.97 m)	310 lb (141 kg)	32 3/8 in (0.82 m)	10 in (0.25 m)	6 ft 6 3/8 in (1.99 m)	5.24 s	1.78 s	3.01 s	4.63 s	7.41 s	30.5 in (0.77 m)	8 ft 11 in (2.72 m)
All values from NFL Combine/Pro Day

=== Philadelphia Eagles ===
Keegan was drafted by the Philadelphia Eagles in the fifth round, with the 172nd overall selection, of the 2024 NFL draft. He won a Super Bowl championship when the Eagles defeated the Kansas City Chiefs 40–22 in Super Bowl LIX.

On August 27, 2025, Keegan was waived by the Eagles.

=== Dallas Cowboys ===
On August 28, 2025, Keegan was claimed off waivers by the Dallas Cowboys. He played in two games for the Cowboys before being placed on injured reserve due to a neck injury on October 21.

On August 30, 2026, Keegan was waived by the Cowboys as a part of final roster cuts.

=== Minnesota Vikings ===
On August 31, 2026, Keegan was claimed off of waivers by the Minnesota Vikings. On November 3, he was waived.

=== Tampa Bay Buccaneers ===
On November 4, 2026, Keegan was claimed off waivers by the Tampa Bay Buccaneers.
