= Randy Salerno =

American journalist

- Born: January 4, 1963; Aurora, Illinois, United States
- Died: January 24, 2008 (aged 45); Eagle River, Wisconsin, United States
- Occupation: Morning News Anchor
- Years active: 1993–2008
- Spouse: Irene Salerno (1997–2008)
- Children: Haley Aynessazian; Slone Salerno; Charlie Salerno

Randall Salerno (January 4, 1963 – January 24, 2008) was an American news anchor for CBS news in Chicago, Illinois at WBBM-TV. Salerno had previously worked at WGN-TV alongside Roseanne Tellez at both WBBM-TV and WGN-TV 1993-2004.

== Biography ==
Salerno served as a general assignment reporter and as the weekend morning news anchor from 1994 till 1999.

Before working at WGN, Salerno was a reporter and weekend anchor at WNYT in Albany, New York. Prior to that, he worked at WMBD-TV and WHOI-TV in Peoria, Illinois. He began his broadcasting career at WIFR-TV in Rockford, Illinois as a general assignment reporter.

Salerno received his B.S. in Communication from Illinois State University in 1985, where he was an anchor/reporter for the campus TV station. He lived in Crystal Lake, Illinois, where he attended Crystal Lake South High School and played basketball.

== Death ==
Salerno died in a snowmobile accident on the night of January 24, 2008, on Plum Lake near Sayner/Eagle River, Wisconsin. He was a passenger on the snowmobile when it struck a tree.

Salerno is survived by his wife Irene and 3 children.

== Awards ==
Randy Salerno won a local Emmy Award for his work on CBS 2's 2004 broadcast of the LaSalle Bank Chicago Marathon.
