= Dennis Gardeck =

American football player (born 1994)

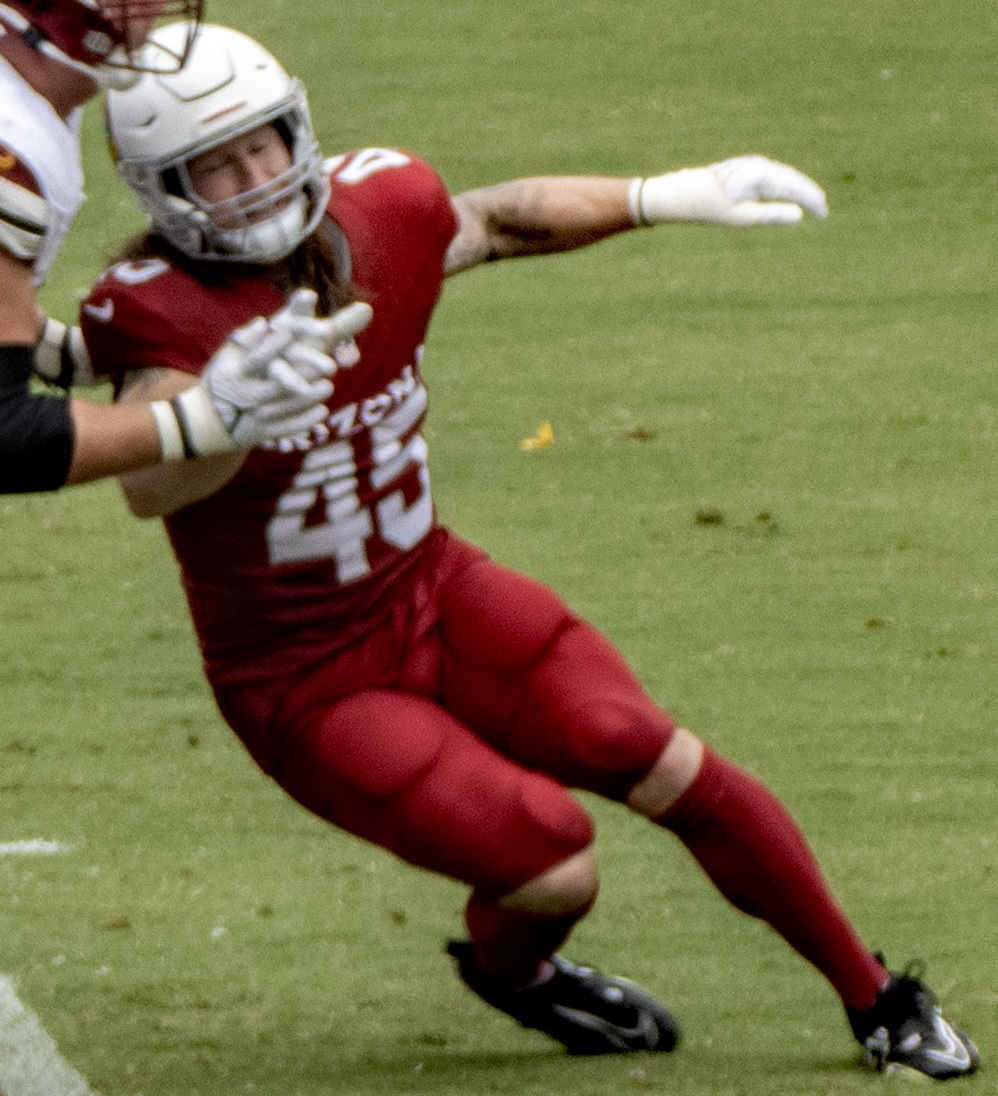
- Gardeck with the Arizona Cardinals in 2023

No. 47 – Jacksonville Jaguars
- Position: Linebacker
- Roster status: Active

Personal information
- Born: August 9, 1994 (age 32); Lake in the Hills, Illinois, U.S.
- Listed height: 6 ft 0 in (1.83 m)
- Listed weight: 232 lb (105 kg)

Career information
- High school: Crystal Lake South (Crystal Lake, Illinois)
- College: West Virginia State (2014–2016); Sioux Falls (2017)
- NFL draft: 2018: undrafted

Career history
- Arizona Cardinals (2018–2024); Jacksonville Jaguars (2025–present)

Awards and highlights
- First-team All-Mountain East (2015); Second-team All-Mountain East (2016); First-team All-NSIC (2017)

Career NFL statistics as of Week 5, 2026
- Total tackles: 216
- Sacks: 19.5
- Forced fumbles: 4
- Fumble recoveries: 4
- Interceptions: 2
- Pass deflections: 10
- Stats at Pro Football Reference

Dennis Gardeck (born August 9, 1994) is an American professional football linebacker for the Jacksonville Jaguars of the National Football League (NFL). He played college football at West Virginia State and Sioux Falls, where he was a nominee for the Harlon Hill Trophy and was a finalist for the Cliff Harris Award. He was signed by the Cardinals as an undrafted free agent in 2018. Gardeck attended Crystal Lake South High School in Crystal Lake, Illinois.

== Early life and college ==
Gardeck was an all-conference linebacker at Crystal Lake South High School in Crystal Lake, Illinois. He was also an all-conference defenseman for his school's lacrosse team. He committed to play college football for Division II West Virginia State. Due to an injury he suffered playing lacrosse during his senior year of high school, he chose to redshirt as a true freshman in 2013, Gardeck was highly productive in his career playing linebacker at West Virginia State. He was named Honorable Mention All-Mountain East in 2014, First-Team All-Mountain East in 2015, and Second-Team All-Mountain East in 2016. While Gardeck received a partial scholarship at WVSU, he supplemented his income by working part-time at a McDonald’s restaurant in South Charleston, West Virginia. In 3 seasons at WVSU, Gardeck finished his career with 273 tackles and 18 sacks. Upon his head coach Jon Anderson being hired as the new head coach for Sioux Falls, Gardeck chose to follow him, spending his final season of eligibility as a graduate transfer, playing linebacker for Sioux Falls

In his lone season at Sioux Falls, Gardeck played in 12 games, recording 75 tackles, 14 sacks, two forced fumbles, and one fumble recovery. He was named First-Team All-NSIC and nominated for the Harlon Hill Trophy due to his play. Overall, he finished his college career with 345 tackles, 32 sacks, nine forced fumbles, two fumble recoveries, and one interception.

Due to his success in college and outstanding athletic traits, Gardeck received an invite to South Dakota State’s 2018 Pro Day, where he performed athletic testing and various positional drills, working out in front of scouts from all 32 NFL teams. Despite having only played linebacker in college, Gardeck also ran fullback, tight end, and defensive line drills, showcasing his athleticism.

== Professional career ==
Pre-draft measurables
Height	Weight	Arm length	Hand span	Wingspan	40-yard dash	10-yard split	20-yard split	20-yard shuttle	Three-cone drill	Vertical jump	Broad jump	Bench press
6 ft 0 1/2 in (1.84 m)	242 lb (110 kg)	31 3/8 in (0.80 m)	8 3/8 in (0.21 m)	6 ft 2 3/8 in (1.89 m)	4.57 s	1.64 s	2.63 s	4.32 s	7.35 s	36.5 in (0.93 m)	10 ft 6 in (3.20 m)	31 reps
All values from Pro Day

=== Arizona Cardinals ===
Gardeck signed with the Arizona Cardinals as an undrafted free agent on April 30, 2018. He made the Cardinals roster as an undrafted rookie, playing in all 16 games primarily on special teams.

In Week 14 of the 2019 season against the Pittsburgh Steelers, Gardeck recovered a fumble forced by teammate Darrell Daniels on punter Jordan Berry during a fake punt attempt in the 23–17 loss.

In Week 5 against the New York Jets in 2020, Gardeck recorded his first two career sacks on Joe Flacco during the 30–10 win. In Week 14 against the New York Giants, Gardeck recorded two sacks on Daniel Jones during the 26–7 victory. In Week 15 against the Philadelphia Eagles, Gardeck recorded two sacks on Jalen Hurts during the 33–26 win. On December 25, 2020, Gardeck was placed on injured reserve. He finished the season second on the team with seven sacks.

The Cardinals placed a restricted free agent tender on Gardeck on March 15, 2021. He signed the one-year contract on April 15. He was placed on injured reserve on September 11, 2021. He was activated on October 2, 2021.

On March 14, 2022, Gardeck signed a three-year contract extension with the Cardinals.

In Week 2 of the 2024 NFL season, Gardeck recorded 3 sacks against the Los Angeles Rams in a 41–10 win for the Cardinals. He also recorded 6 tackles and a forced fumble during the game. In Week 3, he recorded 4 tackles, a pass deflection, and an interception in a 20–13 loss against the Detroit Lions. In Week 7 against the Los Angeles Chargers, Gardeck suffered a torn ACL, ending his season prematurely.

=== Jacksonville Jaguars ===
On June 4, 2025, Gardeck signed with the Jacksonville Jaguars. He played in all 17 games with eight starts, recording 48 tackles, 2.5 sacks, two passes defensed, and a forced fumble.

On March 9, 2026, Gardeck signed a two-year contract extension with the Jaguars.

== NFL career statistics ==
Legend
**Bold**	Career high

=== Regular season ===
Year	Team	Games		Tackles					Interceptions						Fumbles				
Year	Team	GP	GS	Cmb	Solo	Ast	Sck	TFL	Int	Yds	Avg	Lng	TD	PD	FF	Fmb	FR	Yds	TD
2018	ARI	16	0	7	7	0	0.0	0	0	0	0.0	0	0	0	0	0	0	0	0
2019	ARI	14	0	11	7	4	0.0	0	0	0	0.0	0	0	0	0	0	**1**	0	0
2020	ARI	14	0	16	14	2	**7.0**	**7**	0	0	0.0	0	0	0	0	0	**1**	0	0
2021	ARI	14	3	23	14	9	0.0	1	0	0	0.0	0	0	0	0	0	**1**	0	0
2022	ARI	14	3	31	22	9	1.0	2	**1**	**24**	**24.0**	**24**	0	1	**1**	0	0	0	0
2023	ARI	17	8	46	**36**	10	6.0	**7**	0	0	0.0	0	0	**4**	**1**	0	**1**	**2**	0
2024	ARI	7	3	22	17	5	3.0	6	**1**	10	10.0	10	0	2	**1**	0	0	0	0
2025	JAX	17	8	**48**	28	**20**	2.5	6	0	0	0.0	0	0	2	**1**	0	0	0	0
2026	JAX	5	4	12	9	3	0.0	1	0	0	0.0	0	0	1	0	0	0	0	0
Career		118	29	216	154	62	19.5	30	2	34	17.0	24	0	10	4	0	4	2	0

=== Postseason ===
Year	Team	Games		Tackles					Interceptions						Fumbles				
Year	Team	GP	GS	Cmb	Solo	Ast	Sck	TFL	Int	Yds	Avg	Lng	TD	PD	FF	Fmb	FR	Yds	TD
2021	ARI	1	0	1	1	0	0.0	0	0	0	0.0	0	0	0	0	0	0	0	0
2025	JAX	1	1	**3**	**3**	0	0.0	0	0	0	0.0	0	0	0	0	0	0	0	0
Career		2	1	4	4	0	0.0	0	0	0	0.0	0	0	0	0	0	0	0	0

== Personal life ==
Gardeck's brother, Ian, is a former professional baseball player. His other brother, Andrew is a surgeon in training at Houston Methodist Hospital.

Gardeck's nickname is "the Barbarian". He has a tattoo with a quote from the poem "Invictus" by William Ernest Henley, which he received in his sophomore year of college.
