= Oak Hill Capital Partners =

American private equity firm

Oak Hill Capital Management, LLC
- Company type: Private
- Industry: Private Equity
- Founded: 1986; 40 years ago
- Founder: Robert Bass
- Headquarters: 65 East 55th Street; New York City, United States
- Products: Private equity funds, Leveraged buyouts
- Total assets: $10.4 billion
- Number of employees: 50+
- Website: www.oakhillcapital.com

Oak Hill Capital Partners is an American private equity firm headquartered in New York City, with more than $19 billion of committed capital from entrepreneurs, endowments, foundations, corporations, pension funds and global financial institutions. Robert Bass is the lead investor.

Oak Hill Capital is one of several Oak Hill partnerships, each of which has an independent management team. These Oak Hill partnerships comprise over $18 billion of investment capital across multiple asset classes, including private equity, special situations, high yield and bank debt, venture capital, real estate and a public equity exchange fund.

On April 20, 2010 the company announced acquisition of Denver-based data center company ViaWest Inc. for an undisclosed amount.

In 2017 the company sold Wave Broadband for more than $2.3 billion.

== Notable investors ==
Robert Bass, who was an early investor in leveraged buyouts in the 1980s and employed David Bonderman and Jim Coulter the founders of Texas Pacific Group, is the lead investor in Oak Hill Capital Partners.

The company has garnered widespread media attention due to its addition of investors Bill Gates and Nike founder Phil Knight.

Other investors include the Country of Singapore and Stanford University.

== Notable investments ==
Over a period of nearly twenty years, Oak Hill Capital has invested in more than fifty significant private equity transactions, including:

- Imagine Group
- Ariel
- Atlantic Broadband
- Genpact
- The Container Store
- Butler Animal Health Supply
- EXL Service
- Progressive Moulded Products
- TravelCenters of America
- WideOpenWest
- Blackboard Inc.
- American Savings Bank (Washington Mutual)
- Bell & Howell (ProQuest)
- Oreck Corporation
- Vertex Data Science
- eGain
- Wometco Cable Corporation
- MetroNet
- Alibris
- Dave & Buster's
- Local TV LLC
- Checkers and Rally's
- Safe Fleet
- Intermedia
- Invisalign
- Burger King
- Vexus Fiber
- Omni Fiber
- GoNetSpeed
- Financial Engines
- Guild Garage Group

== Recent acquisitions ==
In May 2011, Oak Hill Capital Partners acquired Intermedia, a business communications SaaS company bootstrapped and majority-owned by David Choupak and his wife Anastasia Koroleva, for an undisclosed amount.

In October 2014, Oak Hill Capital Partners acquired Berlin Packaging for a fee of $1.43 billion from Investcorp.

In January 2018, Oak Hill Capital Partners acquired Safe Fleet from The Sterling Group. No value of the deal was mentioned.

On June 15, 2018, Oak Hill Capital Partners acquired a majority stake in VetCor Group Holdings Corp. Terms of the transaction were not disclosed.

On March 6, 2026, Oak Hill Capital acquired Guild Garage Group in a deal valued at $800 million.

== Investment professionals ==
=== Managing Partners ===
- Tyler Wolfram
- Brian Cherry
- Steven Puccinelli

=== Partners ===
- Scott Baker
- Benjamin Diesbach
- Stratton R. Heath III
- John R. Monsky
- John Rachwalski
- Micah Meisel
- Mark Pinho

=== Principals ===
- Adam Hahn
- Peter Armstrong
- Jeffery Mettam
- Christopher Williams
- Nico Theofanidis
- Jennifer Jun

=== Previous Partners ===
- Mark Wolfson
- J Taylor Crandall
- David Brown
- Buford Ray Conley

== Notes ==
- Gates Joins a Dream Team Fund
- Bass' Oak Hill II raises $1.3B
