= Crystal Lake South High School =

Coordinates: 42°12′39″N 88°20′25″W

Location
- 1200 S. McHenry Ave; Crystal Lake, Illinois 60014; United States

Information
- Type: Public secondary
- Established: 1978
- Oversight: Community High School District 155
- Principal: Kimberly Bromley
- Teaching staff: 74.90 (FTE)
- Grades: 9-12
- Enrollment: 1,291 (2023-2024)
- Student to teacher ratio: 17.24
- Colors: Green, gold and white
- Song: “Cheer for the fighting Gators! There are no imitators. Green and the Gold prevail, South High School hail, Ra Ra Ra! Fight Gators fight with might. Win Gators, win tonight.” South High with Green and Gold has victory tonight!
- Mascot: Gators
- Newspaper: Gator Prints
- Website: Crystal Lake South
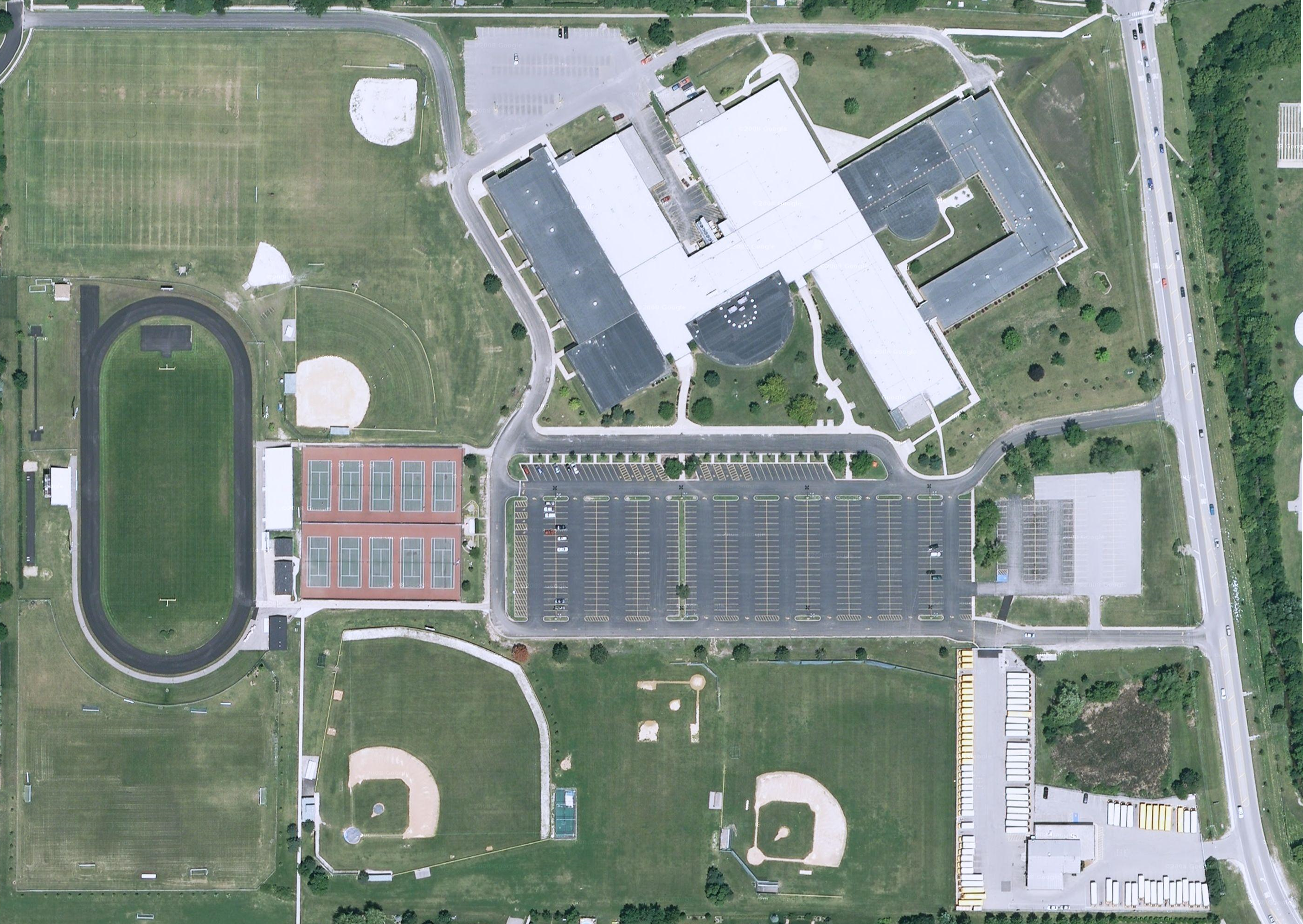

Crystal Lake South High School, often referred to as "South" or "CLS," is one of three high schools in Crystal Lake, Illinois. It currently has a body of roughly 1,916 students. As Crystal Lake's second oldest high school, it was constructed from 1976 to 1978 and opened in August 1978 after Crystal Lake Community High School, now Crystal Lake Central High School, split into two schools due to the pressures of the population growth in the communities it served; Crystal Lake, a part of Lake in the Hills and a small portion of Algonquin. South graduated its first class in 1979 - this class consisted of approximately 250 seniors who were transferred from Crystal Lake Central High School. South graduated its first class who attended all four years in 1982.

After the community's school split, the South Gators and Central Tigers became rivals in the Fox Valley Conference. Recently, however, focus of rivalry has primarily shifted to the Cary-Grove High School Trojans and the Prairie Ridge Wolves due to vastly increased competition in football games between the two schools. However, an underlying tone of competition still vibrates between the two Crystal Lake schools.

The city of Crystal Lake has grown rapidly since South first opened it doors. The school reached its structural capacity in 2002. A new addition opened for the 2003-2004 school year, with several dozen new classrooms. However, due to the phenomenal growth of the city, the addition was already insufficient by the 2005-2006 school year. The graduating class of 2004 consisted of 366 students, class of 2006 had 435 students, and the class of 2009 contained approximately 540 students. The final phase of the 2003-2004 additions was opened in the 2006-2007 school year. The "Lower level" under C-Hall added 10 classrooms and over 100 lockers.

Crystal Lake South High School's mascot is the "Gator". This mascot was chosen in 1976 by a poll of students who would attend South when it first opened. In October 2010, South was asked by the University of Florida to phase out the use of its logo. From this, arose a contest; graduates, current students, and the community got to design and enter logo's to be voted upon for the new one. The new logo was chosen and was used in place of the old one beginning in the 2011-2012 school year. During the summer of 2016, the entrance to the school was rebuilt, and a bronze gator statue was placed outside of the school.

In 2017, the baseball team won the IHSA Class 4A baseball state championship.

== Notable alumni ==
- Trevor Keegan - Class of 2019 - Offensive guard for the Dallas Cowboys
- Paul Lekics - Class of 1991. Retired professional soccer player for the Richmond Kickers and Chicago Fire. Former assistant soccer coach for California State University, Stanislaus
- Scott Olsen - Class of 2002 - Major League pitcher 2005-2010
- Randy Salerno - Class of 1981 - Former news anchor for WGN-TV and WBBM-TV in Chicago
- Dennis Gardeck- American football player for the Jacksonville Jaguars

== Athletic Illinois State Champions ==
- 1981 Boys Golf
- 1990 Pom Squad Novelty Division
- 2012 Pom Squad 3A Kick Division
- 2017 Baseball 4A
- 2019 Boys Soccer
- 2023 Boys Soccer
