= WWXL (Illinois) =

Radio station in Peoria, Illinois

WTVH
- Peoria, Illinois; United States
- Frequency: 1590 kHz

Ownership
- Owner: Hilltop Broadcasting Company

History
- First air date: 1947
- Last air date: December 1954
- Former call signs: WWXL (1947–1952)
- Former frequencies: 1580 kHz (1947–1948)

Technical information
- Power: 1,000 watts

WWXL (1590 AM) was a radio station in Peoria, Illinois, United States. It operated from 1947 to February 1952, when it shut down and was forced into bankruptcy, and then from September 1952 to December 1954 as WTVH.

== History ==
WWXL began broadcasting as a daytime-only station on 1580 kHz and was sold in November 1947 to Homer D. Morrow and Myron A. Reck, formerly of WCFL in Chicago. After the purchase, WWXL moved from 1580 to 1590 kHz and became a 1,000-watt station with nighttime operation on May 24, 1948.

The station suffered a series of financial reversals in 1951 and early 1952. In the wake of a strike at Caterpillar Inc., it cut its operating schedule to 18 hours a day and moved out of its studios in the Hotel Jefferson. In January 1952, the Bureau of Internal Revenue ordered WWXL to pay withholding taxes for 1946 and 1947; unable to raise the money, it shut down on February 3, 1952. Three other creditors, owed for labor and materials, then moved to force the station into involuntary bankruptcy.

Cecil W. Roberts of Farmington, Missouri, bid $11,000 on the station in a bankruptcy auction in early April, but the bankruptcy referee reopened bidding because he thought the price was too low. The station was won later that month for $17,050 by Walter F. Kean and Hugh R. Norman, the latter the owner of KSTT in Davenport, Iowa. After the sale, the station resumed broadcasting on September 1 as WTVH with a music-and-sports format from its transmitter site in Creve Coeur. Kean and Norman formed the Hilltop Broadcasting Company to run WTVH and filed for a television station on channel 19. The resulting station began broadcasting as WTVH-TV on October 15, 1953.

After an attempt to sell the WTVH stations to the Peoria Journal-Star, Hilltop Broadcasting Company took WTVH radio off the air in mid-December 1954 in order to focus solely on the television station and remove interference caused by the co-sited AM operation.
