= Local TV LLC =

Television broadcasting company

- Company type: Private
- Industry: Broadcast television
- Predecessor: Broadcasting division of; The New York Times Company; Eight stations owned by; Fox Television Stations
- Founded: December 2006; 19 years ago
- Defunct: December 27, 2013; 12 years ago
- Fate: Acquired by Tribune
- Successor: Tribune Broadcasting; Nexstar Media Group
- Headquarters: Newport, Kentucky, United States
- Key people: Bobby Lawrence, CEO
- Owner: Oak Hill Capital Partners

Local TV LLC was a television broadcasting company owned by Oak Hill Capital Partners which operated 20 television stations in the United States. The group was formed in 2006 by the acquisition of nine television stations owned by The New York Times Company, and grew further with the acquisition of eight former Fox owned-and-operated stations from Fox Television Stations, and a wide partnership with Tribune Broadcasting to provide management services for the stations (in turn, Local TV also operated several Tribune stations as well).

On July 1, 2013, Tribune announced that it would acquire Local TV LLC for $2.7 billion, a deal which was approved by the FCC on December 20, and was completed on December 27.

== History ==
Local TV was created in December 2006, after Oak Hill Capital entered into an agreement with The New York Times Company to purchase nine local network-affiliated television stations; on May 7, 2007, the sale was completed as one part of a larger sale of the New York Times Company's Broadcast Media Group "for approximately $575 million." At 12:01 a.m., Local TV assumed ownership of the nine television stations, located in "eight mid-sized markets."

On December 21, 2007, Tribune Broadcasting and Local TV agreed to form a "broadcast management company" to provide management services to both Tribune and Local TV's stations. Also as part of the agreement, the websites for Local TV's stations were transitioned to a platform developed and managed by Tribune Interactive. The next day, December 22, 2007, Local TV announced plans to acquire eight Fox owned-and-operated stations from Rupert Murdoch's News Corporation including WDAF-TV in Kansas City, WJW-TV in Cleveland, WITI-TV in Milwaukee, KTVI in St. Louis, Missouri, KDVR in Denver, Colorado, KSTU in Salt Lake City, WBRC in Birmingham, Alabama, and WGHP in High Point–Winston-Salem–Greensboro, North Carolina, completing that sale on July 14, 2008. Local TV's partnership with Tribune expanded on September 17, 2008, as the company announced that it would take over Tribune's CW affiliates KWGN-TV and KPLR-TV under local marketing agreements, and consolidate them with KDVR and KTVI respectively.

As part of Tribune's management agreement, the Local TV stations unveiled redesigned websites operated by Tribune Interactive beginning in January 2009, with the Fox affiliates websites being migrated to the new layout from News Corp. Digital Media's website hosting platform; Local TV later migrated its stations' websites to those hosted by WordPress.com beginning in January 2012.

In January 2009, Raycom Media announced that it would acquire one of Local TV's former Fox O&Os, WBRC-TV in Birmingham, Alabama, in exchange for its CBS affiliate WTVR-TV in Richmond, Virginia and $85 million. Raycom was required to divest WTVR as a condition of its purchase of Lincoln Financial Media's stations (which included Richmond's NBC station WWBT), as both stations ranked among 2 of the 4 highest-rated stations in the market. Raycom was previously blocked from selling WTVR to Sinclair Broadcast Group. The swap also benefited Raycom, as it is based in, and already has a strong media presence in the state of Alabama. On June 14, 2010, CBS Corporation announced that it would sell its CW O&O WGNT in Hampton Roads to Local TV, making it a sister station to its existing CBS affiliate WTKR.

In March 2013, Oak Hill Capital began notifying stations that it was planning to sell the Local TV stations. On July 1, 2013, Tribune Broadcasting announced that it would acquire the company outright for $2.7 billion. The deal was approved by the FCC on December 20, with the completion of the sale on December 27.

=== Officers ===
President and chief executive officer (CEO) was Robert Lawrence, who, Local TV announced on December 20, 2007, would succeed Randy Michaels, former CEO of Clear Channel Communications and Local TV's first CEO, who became chief operating officer (COO) of Tribune Company, on May 7, 2008.

Chief financial officer (CFO) of Local TV was Pam Taylor.

== Former stations ==
Stations are arranged alphabetically by state and by city of license.

Stations owned by Local TV LLC
Media market	State	Station	Purchased	Sold	Notes
Birmingham	Alabama	WBRC	2008	2009	
Huntsville	Alabama	WHNT-TV	2007	2013	
Fort Smith–Fayetteville	Arkansas	KFSM-TV	2007	2013	
Fort Smith–Fayetteville	Arkansas	KXNW	2012	2013	
Denver	Colorado	KDVR	2008	2013	
Denver	Colorado	KWGN-TV	2008	2013	(Note: Owned by Tribune Broadcasting and by Local TV LLC.)
Fort Collins	Colorado	KFCT	2008	2013	(Note: Satellite of KDVR.)
Davenport	Iowa	WBQD-LP	2008	2011	(Note: Owned by Venture Technologies Group, LLC affiliate Four Seasons Broadcasting, and operated by WQAD-TV.)
Davenport	Iowa	WQAD-TV	2007	2013	
Des Moines	Iowa	WHO-DT	2007	2013	
Kansas City	Missouri	WDAF-TV	2008	2013	
St. Louis	Missouri	KTVI	2008	2013	
St. Louis	Missouri	KPLR-TV	2008	2013	
High Point–Greensboro–Winston-Salem	North Carolina	WGHP	2008	2013	
Cleveland	Ohio	WJW	2008	2013	
Oklahoma City	Oklahoma	KAUT-TV	2007	2013	
Oklahoma City	Oklahoma	KFOR-TV	2007	2013	
Scranton–Wilkes Barre	Pennsylvania	WNEP-TV	2007	2013	
Memphis	Tennessee	WREG-TV	2007	2013	
Salt Lake City	Utah	KSTU	2008	2013	
Norfolk–Portsmouth–Newport News	Virginia	WGNT	2010	2013	
Norfolk–Portsmouth–Newport News	Virginia	WTKR	2007	2013	
Richmond	Virginia	WTVR-TV	2009	2013	
Milwaukee	Wisconsin	WITI	2008	2013	

== Related audiovisual resources ==
- "Local TV & Local Responsibility Part One: Stop Big Media". The National Conference for Media Reform. The Oklahoma History Center, Oklahoma City, Oklahoma. May 19, 2007. 25 mins. Video clip. video.google.com (Google). (Part 1 of 3-part videotaped "Panel Discussion on the takeover of New York Times Corporation[']s news stations by Oak Hill Capital Partners and its holding company.")
