= WHOI (TV) =

Television station in Peoria, Illinois

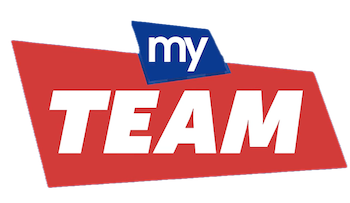
- Peoria–Bloomington–Normal, Illinois; United States
- City: Peoria, Illinois
- Channels: Digital: 24 (UHF); Virtual: 19
- Branding: MyTeam; 25 News (newscasts)

Programming
- Affiliations: 19.1: Independent with MyNetworkTV; for others, see § Subchannels

Ownership
- Owner: Gray Media; (Gray Television Licensee, LLC)
- Sister stations: WEEK-TV

History
- First air date: October 18, 1953
- Former call signs: WTVH-TV (1953–1955); WTVH (1955–1965); WIRL-TV (1965–1971); WRAU-TV (1971–1985)
- Former channel numbers: Analog: 19 (UHF, 1953–2009); Digital: 40 (UHF, 2003–2009), 19 (UHF, 2009–2020)
- Former affiliations: CBS (1953–1957); ABC (1953–2016; secondary until 1957); DuMont (secondary, 1953–1955); UPN (secondary, 1995–1999); Comet (2016–2020); TBD/Roar (2020–2025; now on 19.5)
- Call sign meaning: The Heart of Illinois

Technical information
- Licensing authority: FCC
- Facility ID: 6866
- ERP: 402 kW
- HAAT: 211.6 m (694 ft)
- Transmitter coordinates: 40°37′46″N 89°32′53″W

Links
- Public license information: Public file; LMS

WHOI (channel 19), branded as MyTeam, is an independent television station licensed to Peoria, Illinois, United States, which has a secondary affiliation with MyNetworkTV. It is owned by Gray Media alongside WEEK-TV (channel 25), an affiliate of NBC, ABC and The CW Plus. The two stations share studios and transmitter facilities on Springfield Road (along I-474) in East Peoria.

Channel 19 is the second-oldest TV station in Peoria, beginning broadcasting as WTVH on October 18, 1953. Operating from facilities in Creve Coeur, it was a primary affiliate of CBS until the end of 1957, when it shifted to ABC. The station traded hands several times from the 1960s to the 1980s. When it was co-owned with WIRL radio from 1965 to 1971, it was known as WIRL-TV; after its acquisition by Forward Communications, it changed call signs to WRAU-TV. It was the typical second-place finisher in local news ratings behind WEEK-TV until the station was struck for 219 days by members of the International Brotherhood of Electrical Workers from December 1982 to July 1983, thereafter falling into a fight with WMBD-TV for third place.

Relaunched in 1985 as WHOI—as part of a promotional campaign linking it to the "heart of Illinois"—the station went through continued corporate and staff turnover, never rising above second place in the ratings and more frequently sinking to third. WHOI ran the area's cable-only outlet of The WB and later offered a subchannel affiliated with The CW. In 2009, then-owner Barrington Broadcasting entered into a pact with Granite Broadcasting, then-owner of WEEK-TV, to consolidate the two stations' operations under Granite management. In 2016, WEEK-TV acquired the ABC and CW affiliations from WHOI, leaving channel 19 to broadcast digital multicast television networks. In 2025, the WHOI license was transferred to Gray in a trade with Sinclair Broadcast Group, and channel 19 was relaunched with its present mix of sports-related programming, MyNetworkTV syndication, and newscasts from WEEK.

== History ==
=== Early years ===
In March 1951, during a self-imposed freeze on new television applications, the Federal Communications Commission (FCC) proposed a table of city-by-city channel assignments that included, for the first time, ultra high frequency (UHF) broadcasting. Three channels were proposed to Peoria, Illinois: very high frequency (VHF) channel 8 and UHF channels 37 (reserved for educational use) and 43. Radio station WMBD, citing that a city the size of Peoria required an additional assignment, petitioned the FCC to add channel 12 there; while this plan was denied, the FCC concluded that an additional channel at Peoria was warranted, and UHF channel 19 was added instead.

After the FCC lifted its multi-year freeze in 1952, two parties applied to the FCC for channel 19 in Peoria: the Hilltop Broadcasting Company, the new owner of WWXL (1590 AM), and WPEO. While the hearing was on, WWXL, which Hilltop had acquired out of bankruptcy, began broadcasting under the new call sign WTVH.

WTVH-TV began broadcasting on October 18, 1953, as Peoria's second television station. It aired programs from CBS, ABC, and the DuMont Television Network. The studio and transmitter were located on Stewart Street in Creve Coeur. A year later, the Peoria Journal-Star newspaper company, then publisher of the morning Star and afternoon Journal, acquired a controlling interest in Hilltop and the WTVH stations. The AM station was shut down before the end of the year to focus efforts on channel 19. Even though CBS programs had been on the schedule from the start, WTVH was not a primary CBS affiliate until September 1954. Veteran Illinois broadcaster Doug Quick theorized that uncertainty about the availability of a VHF channel in the Peoria area, channel 8, or whether CBS's Peoria radio affiliate, WMBD, would obtain a permit for a Peoria TV station were reasons for CBS's late commitment.

In technical terms, WTVH-TV broadcast with less power than WEEK-TV (channel 43) when it launched, with an effective radiated power (ERP) of 25,000 watts. The Pantagraph reported that reception of channel 19 was poor in the Bloomington–Normal area when it launched. The ERP was increased to 214,000 watts in November 1954 with the installation of a new transmitter.

=== The fight for deintermixture ===
While WTVH-TV and WEEK-TV worked to establish themselves among viewers in Peoria, they feared the adverse effects of a VHF station against UHF competition; a petition to either delete channel 8 or shift the educational assignment there was rejected by the FCC on November 4, 1954. At the time, VHF channel 8 in Peoria was in the midst of a lengthy comparative hearing between WIRL and WMBD. On November 15, an FCC examiner recommended WIRL for the channel 8 construction permit; the following day, WMBD announced it would appeal the recommendation, with hearings between the two parties scheduled for May 2, 1955.

On March 31, 1955, ahead of the hearings, the FCC announced it would reconsider deintermixture decisions in several cities where such petitions were filed, including Peoria. Oral arguments were presented before the FCC by broadcast representatives on June 27 and 28. Marcus Cohn, an attorney representing WTVH, charged that the broadcast networks discriminated against UHF broadcasters as to rates and national advertising contracts; Thomas Wall, representing WMBD, denied the presence of network problems in Peoria, and charged that, without channel 8, 82,000 Peorians in fringe areas would have no service. WIRL's attorney, Charles Duvall, claimed that UHF and VHF stations were "thriving" in intermixed cities, citing Miami, Florida, and Columbia, South Carolina, as examples. (Note: Of the four licensed UHF stations broadcasting in the two aforementioned cities at the time of the hearings, WGBS-TV in Miami went dark in April 1957; WITV in Fort Lauderdale went dark in May 1958; and WCOS-TV in Columbia signed off in January 1956. Only WNOK-TV in Columbia remained on the air.) Two months later, DuMont ceased its existence as a network in 1955, leaving WTVH with CBS and ABC programming.

In August 1955, WTVH purchased a new, 1,000-foot (300 m) tower to replace the existing 240-foot (73 m) mast at Creve Coeur; despite receiving approval from the Civil Aeronautics Authority the previous February to build to 600 feet (183 m), WTVH's request to use the 1,000-foot tower was denied. The new tower, activated from Creve Coeur on September 19, 1956, stood 660 feet (201 m) tall and had an ERP of 500,000 watts.

On June 29, 1956, the FCC awarded the channel 8 construction permit to WIRL by a 4–3 margin, upholding the FCC examiner's recommendation; however, it stayed construction of the television facilities pending the results of the deintermixture proceedings. Three days earlier, the FCC proposed the substitution of UHF channel 25 for VHF channel 8; that same meeting, to address signal coverage concerns, the FCC authorized an increase in the maximum allowed ERP for UHF stations from one million watts to five million watts.

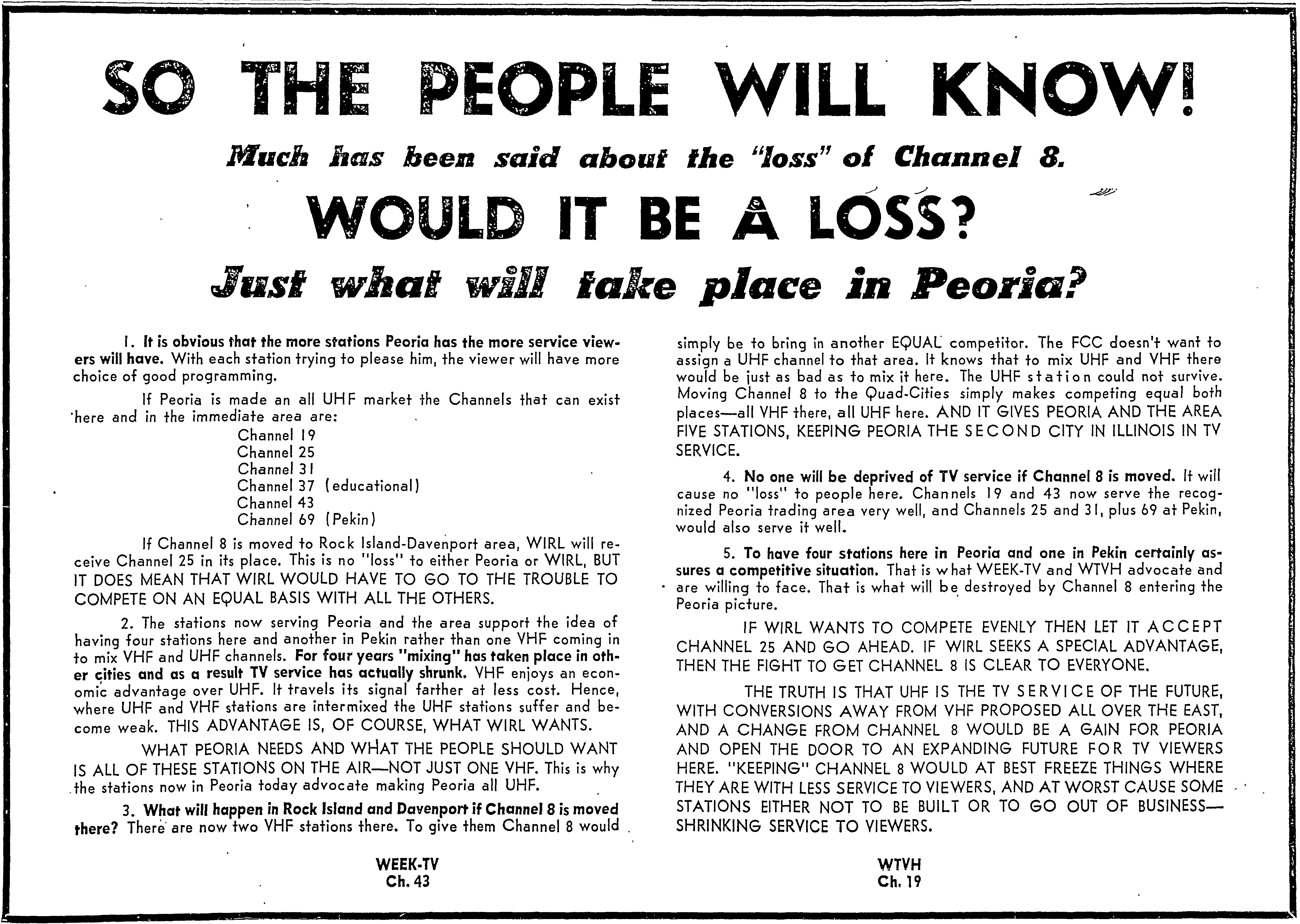
Half-page advertisement in the February 25, 1957 Peoria Journal Star taken out by WTVH and WEEK-TV supporting the FCC proposal to deintermix Peoria, in response to accusations by WIRL of influence peddling

On October 30, WEEK-TV general manager Fred C. Mueller requested that the East Peoria city council reverse its resolution calling for the FCC to let WIRL-TV go into operation. On November 27, WIRL president Timothy W. Swain accused WEEK-TV's chairman, Senator Robert S. Kerr, of using his political influence to prevent WIRL-TV from signing on. WIRL reiterated the accusation on February 24, 1957, two days prior to the FCC vote on deintermixture, when the station took out an advertisement in the Journal Star entitled "Shall Peoria Suffer from Carpetbagging?", citing a February 14 editorial from the Lacon Home Journal.

On February 26, 1957, by a 4–2 decision (with one abstention), the FCC voted to deintermix Peoria, with the channel 8 allocation being moved to the Quad Cities area, and UHF channels 25 and 31 added in its place—the latter at the request of WMBD. Swain bitterly attacked the deintermixture vote and announced it would appeal, calling the FCC's decision "a shocking, flagrant and arbitrary denial of justice, and fairness to the public and Peoria Land" and saying the FCC "gave a first-class city second-class television—UHF".

The plain fact is that while Mr. Swain was making his long "whole hog or none" fight for Channel 8, UHF television proved what it could do for Peoria viewers. The hard facts of TV life in Peoria could not be shouted down. They showed what can be done in the future with UHF not only in Peoria but in the nation. We in Peoria are leading the way to better TV everywhere.

— Editorial, Peoria Journal Star

WMBD utilized its channel 31 construction permit, signing on WMBD-TV on January 1, 1958. The new station took the CBS affiliation, thereby leaving WTVH as a sole ABC affiliate. The change resulted in a curtailed broadcast day, as at the time ABC provided less programming than CBS. In 1959, the Journal Star sold WTVH to the Metropolitan Broadcasting Corporation for $610,000. Metropolitan Broadcasting renamed itself Metromedia in 1961.

WIRL would eventually own a television station, but under different ownership: in 1962, the radio station was sold to the Twelve Ninety Radio Corporation, owned by the Kankakee Daily Journal Company and headed by the Small family of Kankakee, Illinois. Their channel 25 construction permit, awarded as compensation for losing channel 8, was deleted due to inactivity the following year, enabling WEEK-TV to move from channel 43 to 25 in September 1964. In 1965, Metromedia, looking to make room in its portfolio for purchases in larger markets, sold WTVH to the Smalls for $2 million. The new ownership changed the call sign to WIRL-TV on September 13.

=== Forward ownership and later ratings struggles ===
Forward Communications Corporation of Wausau, Wisconsin, acquired the station in a sale completed in April 1971 and changed the call sign to WRAU-TV the following May 1. The news departments of WIRL radio and the newly renamed channel 19 were separated at this time. To make room for a number of employees that had been working in a downtown Peoria office and the news staff, which had previously worked out of the WIRL radio studios, the Creve Coeur studio was expanded. A new, higher-power transmitter was purchased to improve the signal. Under Forward, WRAU-TV's newscasts generally rated second behind WEEK-TV. This changed beginning in December 1982, when workers from the International Brotherhood of Electrical Workers (IBEW) struck the station for 219 days—longer than the concurrent strike against Caterpillar Inc. by the United Auto Workers. Local unions organized a boycott of WRAU-TV advertisers, the station was barred from news conferences in the Caterpillar strike, and news ratings fell to a much more distant second, with non-union technicians producing three newscasts a day. By 1984, channel 19 had fallen behind WMBD-TV in the 10 p.m. news ratings.

Forward Communications was sold in late 1984 to Wesray Capital Corporation, which retained the Forward name for its media holdings. The sale coincided with an overhaul of channel 19's image. Longtime newscaster Clark Smith was fired after 14 years in 1984. The station adopted its present call sign of WHOI on March 17, 1985, as part of a promotional campaign billing the station as "the new heart of Illinois".

Wesray sold the Forward stations to Adams Communications in 1988, but the deal left Adams highly leveraged and ill-prepared to confront declines in the value of broadcast properties, prompting it to default on $283 million of debt in 1991. Brissette Broadcasting was formed the next year when Paul Brissette, who had been the vice president of Adams Communications's television stations division, bought out the business for $257 million. Brissette's management period saw a number of issues in the news department. Ratings fell in 1992, when the station lost the rights to telecast the popular game show Jeopardy! to WMBD and a new news show, Eyewitness Agenda, proved a ratings failure. Recognized news personalities defected to other local stations, including weathercaster Lee Ranson, who had been with channel 19 for 22 years and was described by Mark Gibson of The Pantagraph as "the one constant" at the station through its various changes in ownership and management. In 1994, Brissette Broadcasting fired the general manager, news director, general sales manager, and an assignment editor in a station shakeup; Greg Brissette, son of company owner Paul, was installed as the interim manager, and a new tabloid journalism–type news format was implemented. WHOI carried some programming from UPN, including Star Trek: Voyager, from the network's launch in January 1995 until WAOE (channel 59) went on the air in 1999.

In 1996, as part of a $270 million merger, Brissette was folded into Benedek Broadcasting after the company was unable to expand by adding stations. Two years later, WHOI brought The WB network to the Peoria–Bloomington market by launching WBPE, the local cable-only outlet of The WB 100+ Station Group. Financial problems later developed at Benedek; the early 2000s recession reduced ad sales and caused the company to miss interest payments on a set of bonds it issued in 1996, prompting a filing for Chapter 11 bankruptcy. While most of Benedek's stations were sold to Gray Television, some—including WHOI—went to Chelsey Broadcasting, an affiliate of the Chelsey Capital hedge fund, after Gray determined that not all the stations fit the company's focus at the time on larger markets and CBS affiliates. On August 1, 2003, WHOI began broadcasting a digital signal on channel 40.

Barrington Broadcasting of Hoffman Estates, Illinois, purchased WHOI and KHQA-TV in Hannibal, Missouri, from Chelsey in 2004. The acquisition was among the first for the company, which had already been managing Chelsey's stations for a year and whose founder, Jim Yager, was the former president of Benedek. When The WB merged with UPN to form The CW in 2006, WBPE obtained the affiliation and changed its name to Peoria's CW, being broadcast as a digital subchannel of WHOI. WHOI was the last major Peoria television station to broadcast an analog signal; most stations in the market switched on the original February 17, 2009, digital television transition date, except for WHOI, which completed its switchover on the June 12 final date.

Despite occasional credible efforts, WHOI remained mostly in third place in news ratings in the 1990s and 2000s. By 1999, the market's news race looked like a two-station fight between perennial leader WEEK and a revitalized WMBD; each of their evening newscasts attracted audience shares of 20 percent or more, while WHOI's best-performing newscast mustered a 12-percent share. Though channel 19 improved its ratings steadily in the early- and mid-2000s, the 2006 defection of anchor Paul Ferrante to WMBD caused ratings to slide, particularly among women aged 25–54.

=== Common operation with WEEK-TV ===
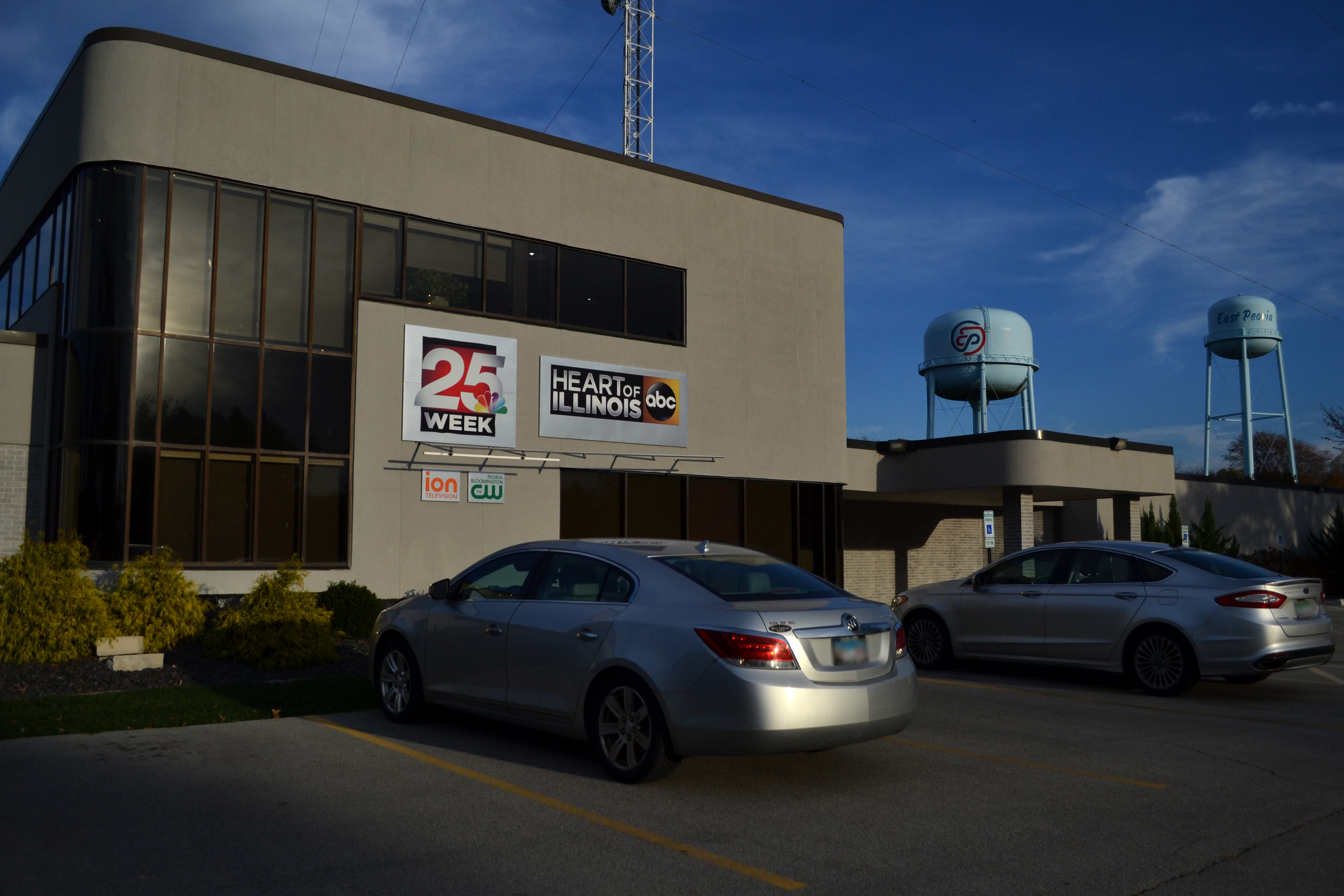
As part of the 2009 consolidation, WHOI operations moved into the WEEK-TV studios in East Peoria (pictured in 2023).

On March 2, 2009, it was made public that WEEK-TV would take over the operations of WHOI through joint sales and shared services agreements. It resulted in WHOI closing its longtime studios near its transmitter in Creve Coeur and moving into WEEK-TV's facility on Springfield Road, along I-474, in East Peoria. Sixteen employees were transferred to WEEK-TV, but as many as thirty were laid off immediately. The alliance was one of two announced on the same day between Barrington and Granite Broadcasting, owner of WEEK-TV. In the other, in Syracuse, New York, Barrington's WSTM-TV assumed the operations of WTVH. WEEK and WHOI began simulcasting weekend newscasts after the change. Granite then shifted playout operations, as well as weekend weather forecasting, for WEEK-TV, WHOI, and WAOE to a hub facility in Fort Wayne, Indiana. Barrington was acquired by Sinclair Broadcast Group in 2013, and Quincy Newspapers acquired WEEK-TV among other stations from Granite in a deal announced in 2014 and completed in 2015. The Quincy/Granite sale was completed on November 2, 2015.

=== Diginet era and MyTeam ===
On July 26, 2016, Quincy Media announced that it had acquired WHOI's ABC and CW affiliations from Sinclair and would consolidate them onto subchannels of WEEK beginning August 1, 2016. At the same time, Quincy-owned WSJV in South Bend, Indiana, relinquished its Fox affiliation to Sinclair-owned WSBT-TV. The ABC and CW subchannels were simulcast on WHOI for 60 days following the consolidation. (Note: The ABC channel was known as Heart of Illinois ABC and continued to offer dedicated newscasts until 2022.) After the end of the transition period, Comet, a diginet owned by Sinclair, moved to WHOI's main 19.1 channel. In 2020, the main channel was switched to TBD, another Sinclair-owned diginet, with Comet moved to 19.2.

Gray Media, which purchased Quincy in 2021, and Sinclair filed with the FCC in 2025 to trade WSJV for WHOI, which resulted in Gray owning both the WEEK-TV and WHOI licenses. On September 29 of that year, the diginet was moved to 19.5, and WHOI was relaunched as a new independent station known as MyTeam. MyTeam's schedule places an emphasis on sports programming, including local high school and college sports, programming from St. Louis-based sister service Matrix Midwest, as well as the WEEK-produced Sports Overtime. Outside of sports programming, it also carries WEEK-produced half-hour 7 a.m. and 9 p.m. newscasts and syndicated programming (including MyNetworkTV).

== Notable former on-air staff ==
- Doug Bell – sportscaster, 1983–1988
- Faith Daniels – weathercaster, July–November 1981
- Lourdes Duarte – reporter
- Randy Salerno – anchor and reporter, to 1986
- Maggie Vespa — reporter
- Marjorie Vincent – reporter, 1995–1998

== Subchannels ==
WHOI's transmitter is co-sited with its studios on Springfield Road (along I-474) in East Peoria. The station's signal is multiplexed:

Subchannels of WHOI
Subchannel	Res.	Short name	Programming
19.1	720p	TEAM	Main WHOI programming
19.2	480i	Charge!	Charge!
19.3	480i	Comet	Comet
19.4	1080i	STAD	Stadium
19.5	480i	ROAR	Roar
19.6	480i	MeTV	MeTV

== See also ==
- Channel 24 digital TV stations in the United States
- Channel 19 virtual TV stations in the United States
