= WQAD-TV =

Television station in Moline, Illinois

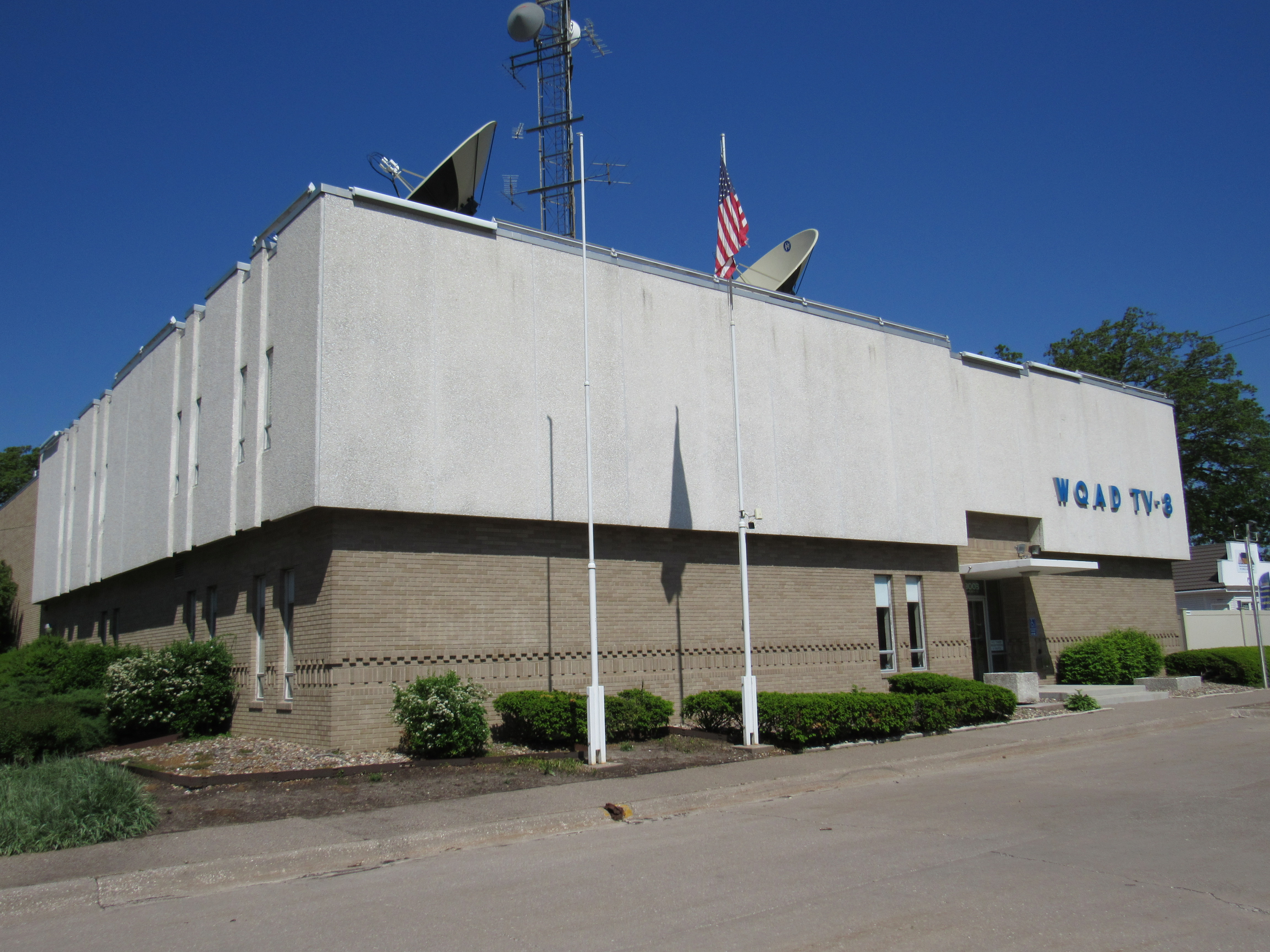
- WQAD studios in Moline
- Moline–Rock Island, Illinois; Davenport–Bettendorf, Iowa; United States
- City: Moline, Illinois
- Channels: Digital: 31 (UHF); Virtual: 8
- Branding: WQAD News 8; MyTV 8-3

Programming
- Affiliations: 8.1: ABC; 8.3: Independent with MyNetworkTV; for others, see § Technical information and subchannels

Ownership
- Owner: Tegna Inc., a subsidiary of Nexstar Media Group; (Tegna Broadcast Holdings, LLC)
- Sister stations: Nexstar: WHBF-TV, KGCW, KLJB

History
- First air date: August 1, 1963
- Former channel numbers: Analog: 8 (VHF, 1963–2009); Digital: 38 (UHF, 2001–2020)
- Call sign meaning: Quad Cities

Technical information
- Licensing authority: FCC
- Facility ID: 73319
- ERP: 1,000 kW
- HAAT: 328 m (1,076 ft)
- Transmitter coordinates: 41°18′44.5″N 90°22′46.2″W

Links
- Public license information: Public file; LMS
- Website: wqad.com

WQAD-TV (channel 8) is a television station licensed to Moline, Illinois, United States, serving as the ABC affiliate for the Quad Cities area. It is owned by the Tegna subsidiary of Nexstar Media Group; Nexstar also owns CBS affiliate WHBF-TV (channel 4) and CW station KGCW (channel 26), and operates Fox affiliate KLJB (channel 18). WQAD-TV's studios are located on Park 16th Street in Moline, and its transmitter is located in Orion, Illinois.

Channel 8 was a comparatively late addition to the market; the allocation was removed from Peoria, Illinois, as part of contentious channel planning proceedings there. Eight different companies pursued the permit to build the station, with Moline Television Corporation prevailing in 1962 after years of hearings. WQAD-TV began broadcasting on August 1, 1963, as the Quad Cities' ABC affiliate. Lingering disputes from the comparative hearing process stretched into the 1970s and impeded an attempted sale of the station.

In 1977, the Des Moines Register and Tribune Company acquired WQAD-TV. It made changes to the local newscasts in an attempt to lift them out of second- and third-place positions, but it has remained in second, as a variety of owners have been unable to put the station ahead of dominant KWQC-TV in the Quad Cities market. Tegna acquired WQAD-TV in 2019 as part of a divestiture package from the merger of Tribune Media and Nexstar Media Group. In addition to its main ABC programming, WQAD-TV programs "MyTV 8-3", a digital subchannel with MyNetworkTV and other programming. In 2026, Tegna and Nexstar merged, bringing WQAD-TV under common operation with WHBF-TV, KLJB, and KGCW.

== History ==
=== Channel 8 in Moline: A deintermixture beneficiary ===
While the Quad Cities area had only received two very high frequency (VHF) television channels (4 and 6), the possibility of adding a third was raised in 1955 in connection with a dispute in the nearby Peoria, Illinois, market. In Peoria, there were two ultra high frequency (UHF) channels and one VHF channel, 8. The UHF station owners wanted to see Peoria designated a UHF "island" to protect them from a superior-facility VHF station that could threaten their economic livelihoods. Likewise, a third station was seen as unlikely on the UHF channels allocated to the area. In June 1956, the Federal Communications Commission (FCC) granted a construction permit to WIRL for Peoria's channel 8, but it stayed the grant pending a proceeding on whether channel 8 would remain in Peoria. An FCC examiner had previously recommended WIRL for the Peoria channel 8 construction permit in December 1954, but the losing applicant, WMBD, appealed the decision.

On February 26, 1957, the FCC moved channel 8 to the Quad Cities and made Peoria all-UHF as part of its deintermixture program. The news immediately brought prospective applicant groups attracted to the possibility of a third station in the area. WIRL appealed, as did KRNT-TV, the channel 8 station in Des Moines; however, the FCC denied those appeals and affirmed its placement of channel 8 in the Quad Cities.

Over the course of 1957, channel 8 in the Quad Cities attracted a slew of applicants, in all. The first to file was an Illinois company, Community Telecasting Corporation, which proposed to locate the station in Moline, Illinois, and included key local figures. Radio station KSTT in Davenport, Iowa, filed; followed by Tele-Views News Company of Rock Island, Illinois, which published a regional TV magazine; Midland Broadcasting Company in Moline, which also included the children of CBS executive H. Leslie Atlass; Illiway Television, primarily consisting of Quad Cities-area investors; Moline Television Corporation, composed of 24 stockholders, primarily residents of the Illinois part of the Quad Cities, as well as former WGN radio and television president Frank Schreiber; and Public Service Broadcasting Company, part-owned by WMT-TV of Cedar Rapids, Iowa. By the start of 1958, these seven groups were in contention for the channel; at the same time, the FCC was defending its Peoria deintermixture decision in federal court, with judge Warren Burger finding in its favor in March 1958. An eighth aspiring owner—Iowa-Illinois Television Company, associated with the Nationwide Mutual Insurance Company of Columbus, Ohio—filed in May 1958; KSTT moved to withdraw its bid in August, weeks before hearings were to start in October. Public Service followed the next month because it was at a competitive disadvantage; the station would have signal overlap to WMT-TV.

The start of the comparative hearing process was delayed until December 1. Weeks before then, on October 20, the Supreme Court of the United States put a freeze on the move of channel 8 to the Quad Cities when it agreed with WIRL that the Peoria deintermixture matter should be reviewed for possible interference in light of an undue influence scandal plaguing the FCC. WIRL had claimed that Robert S. Kerr, a senator from Oklahoma and a stockholder in Peoria's WEEK-TV, had exerted influence in favor of deintermixture. The channel 8 hearing process for the Quad Cities continued and was rescheduled again for January 26, 1959. On the second day of hearings, Iowa-Illinois dropped out, citing the lengthy proceedings. Channel 8 hearings continued through 1959.

FCC hearing examiner Charles J. Frederick delivered an initial decision in April 1960 favoring Community Telecasting Corporation. Illiway and Moline Television appealed, calling into question evidence presented about the experience of Community's proposed general manager. The applicants submitted final oral arguments to the FCC in early June 1961, and later that month, the commission announced that it had chosen not to follow the examiner's recommendation and award the channel to Moline Television instead. The change was criticized by Peoria representative Robert H. Michel, who charged FCC chairman Newton Minow with political motives in the decision because he knew one of the principals in Moline Television. Community asked the FCC to reopen the record, but the commission issued a final decision in favor of Moline Television on May 16, 1962.

=== Construction and early years ===
Even though Moline Television was approved for the construction permit, it still had to face potential appeals from losing applicants as well as the resolution of the underlying channel allocation case, which affected Peoria and Springfield, Illinois. In July 1962, the FCC ruled on changes for Springfield and reaffirmed its move of channel 8 to the Quad Cities. Moline Television officials announced that they would be able to have channel 8 in operation in early 1963, but they were not given permission to begin construction activities until December.

The station took the call sign WQAD-TV; Moline Television moved to build studios on 16th Street and signed an affiliation agreement with ABC. The new station being an affiliate of ABC was virtually assured from the start; ABC programming was split in the Quad Cities between NBC affiliate WOC-TV (channel 6, now KWQC-TV) and CBS affiliate WHBF-TV (channel 4), and the only way to see the full network lineup was to have an antenna capable of receiving WOI-TV from the Des Moines area or KCRG-TV in Cedar Rapids. In March, Moline Television purchased a 150-acre (61 ha) farm in Orion, Illinois, to house its transmitter facility.

WQAD-TV began broadcasting on August 1, 1963. In addition to bringing the Quad Cities the full ABC network schedule for the first time, the station offered local newscasts and a farm and home show airing on weekdays. It was equipped to broadcast network programming and local films in color. Among its early in-house productions was the local franchise of the Romper Room children's series, which aired from 1973 to 1986.

Moline Television agreed to sell the station to the Evening News Association in 1966; the sale was opposed by several principals of Community Telecasting, and the deal was ultimately terminated in October 1967. Community Telecasting's opposition evolved into a challenge to the renewal of WQAD-TV's broadcast license. In February 1968, the FCC designated the license challenge and WQAD-TV's renewal for comparative hearing over commitments made in the original application and its financial qualifications during the Evening News Association sale attempt. The license challenge failed; FCC examiner David I. Kraushaar found "no persuasive public interest basis" not to renew channel 8's license in recommending Moline Television for renewal in February 1969, and the FCC by a majority vote upheld the recommendation in August 1971. Legal fallout from the dispute lingered through 1972.

In 1977, Moline Television Corporation sold WQAD-TV to the Des Moines Register and Tribune Company for $10 million. At the time, the Register and Tribune Company owned no other broadcast properties. The firm then diversified with the purchase of additional radio and TV stations in 1977 and 1978.

=== New York Times Company, Local TV LLC, and Tribune ownership ===
The Register and Tribune Company put its media holdings up for sale in December 1984 after a failed attempt by management, including broadcast division president Michael Gartner, to purchase its flagship property, The Des Moines Register; channel 8 was bought by The New York Times Company.

WQAD began selling advertising for WBQD-LP (channel 26), the low-power UPN affiliate in the Quad Cities owned by Four Seasons Broadcasting, in 2004; WQAD added one person to its sales staff to exclusively sell ad time on the station. WBQD-LP became an affiliate of MyNetworkTV in 2006 and adopted the name "My TV 16", in reference to its channel number on the Mediacom cable system; its relationship with channel 8 deepened, as WQAD began providing master control services in 2006 and a reair of its 6 p.m. newscast in 2007. By 2009, WBQD-LP was simulcast on a digital subchannel of WQAD-TV; WBQD-LP itself left the air for good in December 2011. MyTV moved to channel 3 on Mediacom in 2012.

On January 4, 2007, The New York Times Company sold WQAD and its eight sister television stations to Local TV LLC, a holding company operated by private equity firm Oak Hill Capital Partners, for $530 million; the sale was finalized on May 7. Local TV LLC shared broadcast group management with the Tribune Company, by way of The Other Company, run by Tribune executive Randy Michaels. Tribune acquired the Local TV stations in 2013 for $2.75 billion.

Sinclair Broadcast Group announced in May 2017 that it had agreed to purchase Tribune Media for $3.9 billion. The transaction was nullified on August 9, 2018, when Tribune Media terminated the Sinclair deal and filed a breach of contract lawsuit; this followed a public rejection of the merger by FCC chairman Ajit Pai and the commission voting to put the transactions up for a formal hearing.

=== Tegna ownership ===
In the wake of the collapse of the Sinclair deal, Tribune agreed to sell itself to Nexstar Media Group for $6.4 billion. Nexstar already owned WHBF-TV and KGCW and would be required to divest those stations or WQAD-TV. On March 20, 2019, Tegna Inc. announced it would purchase WQAD-TV and other stations from Nexstar upon consummation of the merger as part of the company's sale of nineteen Nexstar- and Tribune-operated stations to Tegna and the E. W. Scripps Company in separate deals worth $1.32 billion. The sale was completed on September 19, 2019.

On February 22, 2022, Tegna announced that it would be acquired by Standard General and Apollo Global Management for $5.4 billion. The sale never received FCC approval and was canceled on May 22, 2023.

=== Sale to Nexstar ===
Nexstar acquired Tegna in a deal announced in August 2025 and completed on March 19, 2026. The deal included approval for Nexstar to own three station licenses in markets such as the Quad Cities. A temporary restraining order issued one week later by the U.S. District Court for the Eastern District of California, later escalated to a preliminary injunction, has prevented WQAD from being integrated into WHBF/KGCW/KLJB.

== News operation ==
The station began producing local newscasts on the first day it began broadcasting in 1963. WQAD-TV's early news history was closely linked to the station's prominent anchor and reporter, Jim King. He began as the station's original sports anchor, but by 1964, he became the station's main anchorman, a post he would hold until 1998, doubling as news director for most of that time. His sign-off at the end of his newscasts was always, "Thank you for inviting us into your home". King took cameras and gear to Vietnam for two tours of reporting on local troops. He was also known for his On the Road series of reports and his longtime role as the emcee of the station's annual Muscular Dystrophy Association telethons from 1971 to 1998. He died of a heart attack while shoveling his sidewalk on January 2, 1999. King, whose real surname was Ketz, had a son, Kris, who also worked for WQAD, as did his grandson Jonathan. Both are now in Kansas City, working for KMBC-TV and WDAF-TV respectively.

As a local news outlet, WQAD has often been a distant second- or third-place station, with WOC-TV/KWQC far out front. As most of the population of the Quad Cities is in Iowa, WQAD's image as an Illinois station hurt it among many viewers, while channel 6 commanded more than half of the late news audience. Under Register and Tribune Company ownership, the station added a live microwave van, the second in the market; added staff; and expanded its news output. The station's newscasts were trailing but more competitive by 1982, though they had slipped to third again by 1984. During this time, the station made several shuffles in unsuccessful attempts to increase its early evening news ratings; an attempt to bolster the ratings of the early evening local news and World News Tonight by airing local news at 5:30 p.m. and the network news at 6 was abandoned after both programs saw viewership decline. KWQC continued to dominate into the 1990s, with WQAD a distant second ahead of WHBF; however, WQAD continued to be the most critically acclaimed station, frequently besting its competitors at regional journalism awards.

WQAD debuted the first edition of its morning newscast, Good Morning Quad-Cities, in 1992, as well as the market's first weekend morning newscasts; originally an hour in duration, the program expanded to two hours in 2002. An hour-long midday newscast, News 8 at 11, debuted on September 22, 2008, anchored by the weekday morning team. The station had dropped its previous midday newscast, called Newsday, in 1998.

From 2010 to 2012, WQAD-TV produced a 9 p.m. local newscast for Fox affiliate KLJB (channel 18). KLJB's local news had been produced by Davenport-based Independent News Network; channel 8's general manager convinced KLJB to switch to a newscast produced by another Quad Cities station instead. Beginning on December 31, 2012, KWQC-TV began producing the newscast instead; WQAD began producing a 9 p.m. newscast again, this time for its MyTV subchannel, in January 2016.

=== Notable former on-air staff ===
- Hoda Kotb – morning anchor and reporter (1988–1990)
- Robin Swoboda — reporter and anchor (1981–1985), known as Robin Cole at WQAD

== Technical information and subchannels ==
Logo for subchannel 8.3

WQAD-TV broadcasts from a transmitter facility in Orion, Illinois. Its signal is multiplexed:

Subchannels of WQAD-TV
Subchannel	Res.	Short name	Programming
8.1	720p	WQAD-HD	ABC
8.2	480i	WQADATV	Antenna TV
8.3	720p	MyTv8.3	Independent with MyNetworkTV
8.4	480i	Crime	True Crime Network
8.5	480i	Quest	Quest
8.6	480i	NEST	The Nest
8.7	480i	BUSTED	Busted

WQAD-TV was the first local station to begin digital broadcasting, putting out its first digital signal on December 13, 2001. The station shut down its analog signal, over VHF channel 8, on June 12, 2009, when full-power television stations in the United States transitioned from analog to digital broadcasts under federal mandate. The station's digital signal remained on its pre-transition channel 38, using virtual channel 8. WQAD-TV relocated its signal from channel 38 to channel 31 on January 17, 2020, as a result of the 2016 United States wireless spectrum auction.
