= National Register of Historic Places listings in Walworth County, Wisconsin =

Location of Walworth County in Wisconsin

This is a list of the National Register of Historic Places listings in Walworth County, Wisconsin. It is intended to provide a comprehensive listing of entries in the National Register of Historic Places that are located in Walworth County, Wisconsin. The locations of National Register properties for which the latitude and longitude coordinates are included below may be seen in a map.

There are 52 properties and districts listed on the National Register in the county. Another four properties were once listed but have been removed.

This National Park Service list is complete through NPS recent listings posted September 11, 2026.

== Current listings ==
	Name on the Register	Image	Date listed	Location	City or town	Description
1	Henry D. L. and Jennie Adkins House		January 4, 2024 (#100009715)	24 North Church Street; 42°40′24″N 88°32′47″W	Elkhorn	Well-preserved 2-story brick house designed in Georgian Revival style by Chicago architect Henry K. Holsman and built in 1909.
2	A. H. Allyn House	A. H. Allyn House	September 5, 1985 (#85001950)	511 E. Walworth Ave. 42°38′00″N 88°38′30″W	Delavan	High-style Queen Anne mansion designed by E. Townsend Mix and built in 1885 for Alexander Allyn, a wealthy farmer. Later converted to nursing home, furniture store, and back to a residence.
3	John and Margaret Bell House	John and Margaret Bell House	September 15, 1994 (#94001154)	554 Spring Prairie Rd. 42°41′55″N 88°19′44″W	Spring Prairie	1852 house built of locally quarried sandstone, with both Greek Revival and Italianate elements. Bell established the first nursery in Walworth County, with 250,000 trees in 1858.
4	Black Point	Black Point	September 15, 1994 (#94001147)	580 S. Lake Shore Dr. (Pier 580); 42°33′29″N 88°30′39″W	Linn	Well-preserved Queen Anne mansion with a 4-story lookout tower on a bluff above Geneva Lake, designed by Adolph Cudell and built in 1888 for German immigrant and Chicago brewer Conrad Seipp. Now a museum.
5	Bonnie Brae	Bonnie Brae	April 3, 1986 (#86000614)	78 Snake Rd. 42°34′21″N 88°28′57″W	Linn	Queen Anne mansion designed by C.A. Alexander and built in 1881 for Judge Thomas Withrow and named for his daughter Bonnie.
6	George W. Borg Corporation	George W. Borg Corporation	February 6, 2020 (#100004953)	820 East Wisconsin St. 42°37′53″N 88°38′13″W	Delavan	2-story brick factory built in 1943, where the Biggs Division manufactured war materiel during WWII, including time fuzes for anti-aircraft shells, employing many women. After the war Borg manufactured fabrics, innovating in equipment, fabrics and manufacturing processes. Borg was the largest employer in Delavan from the 1940s to the '60s.
7	Carl and Clara Bucholtz Farmstead	Carl and Clara Bucholtz Farmstead	November 9, 2018 (#100003104)	W425 Miller Rd. 42°46′13″N 88°19′25″W	East Troy	Includes the ruins of an 1839 smokehouse, a chicken coop built around 1860, an 1860 threshing/dairy barn, a 1901 horse barn, a 1901 milk house, a 1911 outhouse, and a dignified 1911 Queen Anne-styled house.
8	Buena Vista House	Buena Vista House	January 18, 1978 (#78000143)	2090 Church St. 42°47′08″N 88°24′16″W	East Troy	1846 inn built in Greek Revival style by Samuel Bradley of Milwaukee. It is the largest cobblestone-clad building in the state. Demolished in 2022.
9	Davidson Hall		July 2, 1987 (#87000443)	550 S. Shore Dr. 42°32′54″N 88°31′31″W	Lake Geneva	Neoclassical building of Northwestern Military and Naval Academy on the banks of Lake Geneva, built in 1912. Now demolished.
10	Delavan Downtown Commercial Historic District	Delavan Downtown Commercial Historic District	March 8, 2016 (#16000067)	Generally bounded by the 200, 300 & 400 blocks of E. Walworth Ave. 42°37′59″N 88°38′43″W	Delavan	Delavan's old downtown, including the 1871 Italianate-styled Hollister Block, the 1898 Italianate Mullins Brothers Saloon, the 1908 Neoclassical Aram Public Library designed by Claude and Starck, the 1908 20th-Century Commercial-style Bolver and Lackney Building, and the 1916 Mediterranean Revival Knights of Pythias Building.
11	Delavan Post Office	Delavan Post Office	October 24, 2000 (#00001260)	335 E. Walworth Ave. 42°38′00″N 88°38′38″W	Delavan	2-story Neoclassical-styled structure designed by Oscar Wenderoth and built in 1914. Inside is a mural depicting Delavan history painted by Rosemary Roth in 1984.
12	Delavan's Vitrified Brick Street	Delavan's Vitrified Brick Street	March 7, 1996 (#96000234)	100-300 blocks of E. Walworth Ave. 42°37′59″N 88°38′55″W	Delavan	This main business street was paved with brick in 1913, a vast improvement over the mud and dust that preceded it. Some of the original bricks are still in place.
13	Delavan Water Tower Park Historic District	Delavan Water Tower Park Historic District	March 8, 2016 (#16000068)	Generally bounded by 101-137 Park Pl. & 104-130 E. Walworth Ave. 42°37′59″N 88°38′52″W	Delavan	Small commercial district around the water tower, including the 1851 Italianate-styled Jackson Flats, the 1866 Greek Revival Smith's Blacksmith Shop, the 1919 20th Century Commercial-styled Delavan Motor Co. Garage, and the 1961 Sikes Motor Sales.
14	Douglass-Stevenson House	Douglass-Stevenson House	April 3, 1986 (#86000615)	Main and Mill Sts. 42°32′57″N 88°34′51″W	Fontana	House built in the 1840s with some stovewood walls. Carlos Douglass operated early grist mills in Fontana, developed the lots around them, and donated land for the first school. He was later a state legislator.
15	Downtown Darien Historic District	Downtown Darien Historic District	September 4, 2013 (#13000686)	Bounded by Wisconsin St. from W. Beloit to Fremont Sts. 42°36′04″N 88°42′28″W	Darien	Commercial district which developed after the railroad arrived in the 1850s. Many of the initial wood storefronts burned in fires of 1909 and 1912 and were replaced with red brick buildings.
16	East Troy Electric Railroad Historic District	East Troy Electric Railroad Historic District	June 10, 2026 (#100013124)	A corridor beginning west of Division Street in East Troy and ending in Indianhead Park in Mukwonago; 42°47′18″N 88°24′17″W	East Troy	Remnant segment of the old electric rail line that The Milwaukee Electric Railway and Light Company built to East Troy in 1907. At the time it was faster and cleaner than traveling by buggy, but the Model T came out that same year, and TMERLC filed to abandon the line in 1939. After various incarnations, the line from Mukwonago to East Troy now runs as a rolling museum.
17	East Wing (Old Main)	East Wing (Old Main)	December 13, 1984 (#84000609)	University of Wisconsin; 42°50′10″N 88°44′36″W	Whitewater	4-story Renaissance Revival building designed by Arthur Peabody and added in 1924-25 as a wing of the larger Old Main complex of the Whitewater Normal School. Most of Old Main burned in 1970, leaving only this wing, today known as Hyer Hall.
18	Edward Elderkin House	Edward Elderkin House	May 3, 1974 (#74000132)	127 S. Lincoln St. 42°40′05″N 88°33′09″W	Elkhorn	Brick 2-story octagon house with cupola, built in 1856 for lawyer Elderkin.
19	Elkhorn Band Shell	Elkhorn Band Shell	August 7, 2012 (#12000490)	Sunset Park, bounded by Devendorf, W. Centralia, & Park Sts. 42°40′04″N 88°33′23″W	Elkhorn	1926 band shell with Classical Revival styling and a wooden rear stage wall designed for good acoustics. Originally located in courthouse square, it was moved to Sunset Park in 1962. Still hosts summer concerts.
20	Elkhorn Municipal Building	Elkhorn Municipal Building	August 7, 2012 (#12000491)	9 S. Broad St. 42°40′18″N 88°32′40″W	Elkhorn	Public building designed by Edward Tough in Art Deco style and built in 1931. In early years the basement held fire department facilities, the first floor held the light and water department, city offices, and the fire department garage, the second and third floors held an auditorium and the third floor hosted the American Legion.
21	Elkhorn Post Office	Elkhorn Post Office	October 24, 2000 (#00001259)	102 E. Walworth St. 42°40′20″N 88°32′30″W	Elkhorn	Art Moderne-styled post office built in 1936, with same design as the one in Berlin. Inside is a mural painted by Tom Rost, depicting early mail delivery on horseback.
22	Grace and Pearl Historic District	Grace and Pearl Historic District	August 5, 1993 (#93000810)	Roughly bounded by Pearl, Park, Dougall, Grace and Martin Sts. 42°30′06″N 88°43′31″W	Sharon	Residential historic district of 62 contributing properties, ranging from the 1860 Manning Hoard house, to the 1875 Italianate Daniels/Pearson house, the 1893 Queen Anne Dr. Ripley house, to the 1900 Dutch Colonial Revival William Hoard house.
23	Halverson Log Cabin	Halverson Log Cabin	January 8, 1985 (#85000070)	University of Wisconsin-Whitewater Campus; 42°50′13″N 88°44′38″W	Whitewater	Pioneer home built by Norwegian immigrants Gullik and Dorothea Halverson in 1846 six miles south of Whitewater. Whitewater Normal School moved it to the present location in 1907 as a museum.
24	Heart Prairie Lutheran Church	Heart Prairie Lutheran Church	December 27, 1974 (#74000133)	South of Whitewater on Town Line Rd. 42°45′23″N 88°42′07″W	Whitewater	Greek Revival church clad in cream brick and built in 1855.
25	Heart Prairie Norwegian Methodist Episcopal Church	Heart Prairie Norwegian Methodist Episcopal Church	March 24, 2023 (#100008810)	N7372 Cty. Rd. P 42°45′05″N 88°40′36″W	Richmond	Small Greek Revival-styled rural Methodist Episcopal church built in 1852.
26	Horticultural Hall	Horticultural Hall	September 29, 1999 (#99001220)	330 Broad St. 42°35′39″N 88°26′07″W	Lake Geneva	Craftsman-styled meeting hall built in 1912 by the Lake Geneva Horticultural Society and later used and supported by gardening clubs.
27	A.P. Johnson House	A.P. Johnson House	July 9, 1982 (#82000715)	3455 S. Shore Dr. 42°35′25″N 88°36′58″W	Delavan	Transitional Prairie School home designed by Frank Lloyd Wright in 1905.
28	Fred B. Jones Estate	Fred B. Jones Estate	December 27, 1974 (#74000134)	3335 S. Shore Dr. 42°35′35″N 88°36′38″W	Delavan Lake	Compound of Prairie School buildings designed by Frank Lloyd Wright and built from 1900 to 1903, including gatehouse, house, boathouse, barn and stable. A.k.a. Penwern Estate.
29	Horace Loomis House	Horace Loomis House	December 3, 1974 (#74000357)	2.4 miles (3.9 km) south of East Troy at N7297 WI 120; 42°45′22″N 88°24′24″W	East Troy	2-story Greek Revival house with cobblestone exterior and stone quoins, built in 1851.
30	Main Street Historic District	Main Street Historic District	December 21, 1989 (#89002116)	Roughly W. Main St./US 12 from Prairie St. to Fremont St. and Church St. from Forest Ave. to W. Main St. 42°50′00″N 88°44′14″W	Whitewater	Prestigious residential neighborhood between the central downtown and the UW, including the c.1847 Gothic Revival O'Connor house, the 1856 Italian Villa-style Smith-Allen house, the 1851/1878 Second Empire Kinney-Cox house, the 1882 Romanesque Revival First Congregational Church, the 1895 Queen Anne Engebretsen-Dorr house, the 1903 Birge fountain, and the 1904 Neoclassical White Memorial Library.
31	Main Street Historic District	Main Street Historic District	January 11, 2002 (#01001453)	Roughly Main St., from Broad St. to Center St. 42°35′30″N 88°26′04″W	Lake Geneva	Part of the old downtown, with buildings ranging from the 1871 Italianate-styled Hanna Block to the 1929 Wisconsin Power and Light Company Building, with its Colonial Revival stylings.
32	Maple Park Historic District	Maple Park Historic District	June 17, 2005 (#05000621)	Generally bounded by North, Cook, Main and Maxwell Sts. 42°35′44″N 88°26′24″W	Lake Geneva	Historic neighborhood around the 1837 Maple Park, including the 1859 Greek Revival Holt house, the 1868 Italianate Nethercut house, the 1880 Gothic Revival Episcopal Church of the Holy Communion, the 1883 Queen Anne Hitchcock-Fiske house, the 1904 Classical Revival-influenced Central School, the 1909 Tudor Revival McDonald house, a 1950 Lustron house, and the 1954 Wrightian Public Library.
33	Maples Mound Group	Maples Mound Group	June 7, 1991 (#91000671)	288 S. Indian Mound Parkway; 42°49′51″N 88°45′57″W	Whitewater	Group of prehistoric mounds in a city park, including two panther effigy mounds, a turtle, and two birds. Some seem aligned with compass or solstice points.
34	Metropolitan Block	Metropolitan Block	April 19, 1990 (#90000559)	772 Main St. 42°35′30″N 88°26′06″W	Lake Geneva	3-story fine Italianate-styled business block designed by William LeBaron Jenney and built by O.T. LaSalle in 1873-74. It initially housed H.H. Curtis' drug store, Hicks' harness shop, Valentine's grocery store, Carlton's barber shop, the Lake Geneva Herald, Dr. Catlin's office, and meeting rooms upstairs.
35	Meyerhofer Cobblestone House	Meyerhofer Cobblestone House	December 8, 1980 (#80000202)	East of Lake Geneva on Townline Rd. 42°34′56″N 88°23′21″W	Lake Geneva	Farmhouse with cobblestone walls and Greek Revival cornice returns and pediment, built around 1850 by German immigrant and stonemason Nikolaus Meyerhofer with stones gathered by his daughters on their farm.
36	Mile Long Site	Mile Long Site	June 23, 1977 (#77000057)	Address Restricted	Delavan	Archeological site at which have been found a Clovis point, Folsom points, Plano points, and grit-tempered Mississippian ceramics.
37	Oak Hill Cemetery		April 26, 2021 (#100006406)	1101 Cemetery Rd. 42°36′20″N 88°26′23″W	Lake Geneva	Established in 1880 on forty rolling acres, an example of the Rural Cemetery Movement, in which people chose to be buried outside their cities in park-like, non-denominational settings.
38	Redwood Cottage	Redwood Cottage	September 7, 1984 (#84003796)	327 Wrigley Dr. 42°35′16″N 88°25′56″W	Lake Geneva	Queen Anne-styled summer cottage/mansion built in 1885 for Emily Baker, widow of a part-owner of the J.I. Case Company.
39	Reynolds-Weed House	Reynolds-Weed House	March 31, 1983 (#83003429)	12 N. Church St. 42°40′21″N 88°32′47″W	Elkhorn	Built as a plain brick schoolhouse in 1850, then bought by Dr. James Reynolds for a home in 1868. The wooden Victorian Italianate decorations and bay windows were added by Reynolds or subsequent owner Belden Weed, who bought the house in 1879.
40	The Riviera	The Riviera	April 3, 1986 (#86000616)	810 Wrigley Dr. 42°35′24″N 88°26′11″W	Lake Geneva	Ballroom and marina built on the shore of Geneva Lake in 1932 which has hosted acts ranging from big bands like Glenn Miller to jazz singers like Ella Fitzgerald to disco acts like the Village People.
41	Sheboygan Light, Power and Railway Company Car #26	Sheboygan Light, Power and Railway Company Car #26	November 21, 2006 (#06001069)	2015 Division St. 42°47′16″N 88°24′33″W	East Troy	Wooden electric-powered, self-propelled streetcar built in 1908, which carried passengers in the Sheboygan area for 30 years, until street cars succumbed to automobiles and buses.
42	Smith and Meadows Store Buildings	Smith and Meadows Store Buildings	March 12, 1993 (#93000067)	2888-2890 Main St. 42°47′09″N 88°24′20″W	East Troy	Two adjacent brick stores on the square in East Troy, with similar round arched windows. Charles W. Smith built the first in the 1860s. George and William Meadows built the hardware store next door in 1881, with the entry flanked by iron columns with Corinthian capitals. Later the Lacy and Clancy Hardware Store.
43	T. C. Smith House		November 30, 1982 (#82001852)	251 Cook St. 42°35′31″N 88°26′13″W	Lake Geneva	Greek Revival/Italianate-styled house built in 1879-80, with a Victorian interior. Smith ran a hardware store, and was an organizer of the company that brought the railroad to Lake Geneva. Moved from 865 Main St. in 2003.
44	Israel Stowell Temperance House	Israel Stowell Temperance House	August 11, 1978 (#78000145)	61-65 E. Walworth Ave. 42°37′59″N 88°38′56″W	Delavan	Alcohol-free tavern built in 1840 by Israel Stowell, when Delavan was still a temperance colony; it was demolished in 2021.
45	James Jesse Strang House	James Jesse Strang House	January 24, 1974 (#74000135)	West of Burlington on WI 11; 42°41′00″N 88°18′32″W	Burlington	Simple 1.5-story cottage built in 1844 with saltbox profile and walls of limestone rubble, typical of Mormon construction at that time. Strang was a lawyer from New York who vied with Brigham Young to lead the Mormons after Joseph Smith was murdered. Strang established the breakaway Strangite community at Voree and led them to Big Beaver Island, where he ruled as king until assassinated.
46	Wandawega Inn	Wandawega Inn	June 8, 2015 (#15000341)	W5453 Lake View Dr. 42°44′42″N 88°34′13″W	Sugar Creek	The tavern, "Orphan Annie's," was built in 1927, bucking Prohibition with bootleg liquor, gambling, and prostitution until shut down. Reopened in 1946 as the family-friendly Wandawega Lake Resort. Reopened in 1961 as a summer camp for Latvian Catholics. Now a resort again.
47	Anson Warner Farmstead	Anson Warner Farmstead	November 23, 1998 (#98001431)	N9334 Warner Rd. 42°49′42″N 88°46′35″W	Whitewater	Early farm, including the 1850-1862 Greek Revival/Italianate brick farmhouse, the 1884 milk house, the 1884 carriage house, the 1910 poultry house, and the 1917 barn.
48	Joseph P. Webster House	Joseph P. Webster House	February 23, 1972 (#72000066)	9 E. Rockwell St. 42°40′06″N 88°32′33″W	Elkhorn	1.5-story Greek Revival-styled structure built in 1836 on Elkhorn's public square as the land office. Later moved to the current location, where it was the home of Webster, the composer of Lorena and In the Sweet By and By.
49	Whitewater Hotel	Whitewater Hotel	January 21, 2010 (#09001273)	226 W. Whitewater St. 42°49′57″N 88°43′59″W	Whitewater	2-story hotel built near Whitewater's depots in 1894.
50	Whitewater Passenger Depot	Whitewater Passenger Depot	June 12, 2013 (#13000376)	301 W. Whitewater St. 42°49′54″N 88°43′58″W	Whitewater	Highly intact small-town depot with typical wide, overhanging eaves, designed by J. T. W. Jennings and built in 1891 by the CM&SP. The brick and rough limestone are drawn from Richardsonian Romanesque style and the graceful knee braces from High Victorian Gothic. Inside are two rooms: a waiting room with a fireplace, and a ticket office/gentleman's smoking room.
51	Whitewater Post Office	Whitewater Post Office	October 24, 2000 (#00001256)	213 Center St. 42°49′59″N 88°43′59″W	Whitewater	Small Georgian Revival-styled building with red brick walls and stone trim, with an arch around the front door, built by the New Deal's PWA in 1936. Same design as the old Kaukauna Post Office.
52	Younglands	Younglands	September 18, 1979 (#79000116)	880 Lake Shore Dr. 42°34′56″N 88°26′01″W	Lake Geneva	3-story mansion on Geneva Lake built as a summer cottage for German immigrant and Chicago businessman Otto Young. Henry Lord Gay designed it in Italian Renaissance revival style and it was built from 1899 to 1901. Later served as an Episcopalian girls' school.

== Former listings ==
	Name on the Register	Image	Date listed	Date removed	Location	City or town	Description
1	Bradley Knitting Company	Bradley Knitting Company	March 19, 1992 (#92000168)	April 6, 2011	902 Wisconsin St. 42°37′55″N 88°38′05″W	Delavan	3-story brick factory with Art Deco styling, built in 1923.
2	Lake Geneva Depot	Lake Geneva Depot	July 31, 1978 (#78000144)	February 18, 1987	Broad St.	Lake Geneva	Depot of the C&NW Railroad, designed by Charles Sumner Frost in Queen Anne style and built in 1891. Demolished in August 1986.
3	Loramoor		January 16, 1980 (#80000201)	May 30, 1986	S of Lake Geneva at 774 S. Lake Shore Dr.	Lake Geneva vicinity	Estate of James Hobert Moore, a founder of Nabisco, named for his wife Lora. The Tudor Revival mansion was designed by Jarvis Hunt, built in 1900, and torn down in 1984. Outbuildings like the 1900 gatehouse and stables remain.
4	Phoenix Hall-Wisconsin Institute for the Education of the Deaf and Dumb	Phoenix Hall-Wisconsin Institute for the Education of the Deaf and Dumb	March 19, 1987 (#87000492)	April 21, 2014	Wisconsin School for the Deaf, 309 W. Walworth St. 42°38′01″N 88°39′25″W	Delavan	Two-story Italianate-styled brick dormitory, designed by E. Townsend Mix and built in 1880.

== See also ==
- List of National Historic Landmarks in Wisconsin
- National Register of Historic Places listings in Wisconsin
- Listings in neighboring counties: Boone (IL), Jefferson, Kenosha, McHenry (IL), Racine, Rock, Waukesha
