= Elderkin =

Elderkin is a surname. Notable persons with the surname include:

- Angel Elderkin (born 1977), American basketball coach
- Angus Elderkin (1896 – c. 1985), Canadian politician
- Edward Elderkin, builder of Edward Elderkin House
- Kate Elderkin (1897–1962), American archaeologist, art historian
- Mark Elderkin (born 1963), American entrepreneur
- Nabil Elderkin, Australian photographer
- Noble S. Elderkin (1810–1875), American politician
- Susan Elderkin (born 1968), English author
- Thomas Elderkin (1909–1961), English cricketer
- Aaron Elderkin (born 1989), Voisey's Bay Chief Engineer

== Other ==
- Elderkin Potter (1782–1845), American politician and lawyer from Ohio
