= Francis Dewes =

Chicago brewer and millionaire

Francis Joseph Dewes (April 8, 1845 – December 21, 1922) was a Chicago brewer and millionaire. Born in Losheim, near Trier in Prussia on April 8, 1845, he was the son of Peter Dewes, a brewer and member of the German parliament. Francis Dewes emigrated to the United States of America in 1868 and settled in Chicago. There he found employment as a bookkeeper for established brewing companies such as Rehm and Bartholomae and the Busch and Brand Brewing Company. After rising through the ranks, he founded his own successful brewing firm—F. J. Dewes Brewery Company—in 1881, which would become City Brewing Company in 1898. Shortly thereafter Dewes took over the presidency at the Standard Brewery.

In 1896, Adolph Cudell and Arthur Hercz built a German baroque mansion for him at 503 West Wrightwood Avenue in Lincoln Park, Chicago, that became the Chicago landmark Francis J. Dewes House. His brother Carl Dewes had the house next door at number 509 built in a similar style.

Francis Dewes also donated the ten-foot-tall statue of Alexander von Humboldt, which was sculpted by Felix Gorling, that stands in Humboldt Park.

He died in Chicago on December 21, 1922.
