= Statue of Alexander von Humboldt (Chicago) =

American Monument

Alexander von Humboldt statue
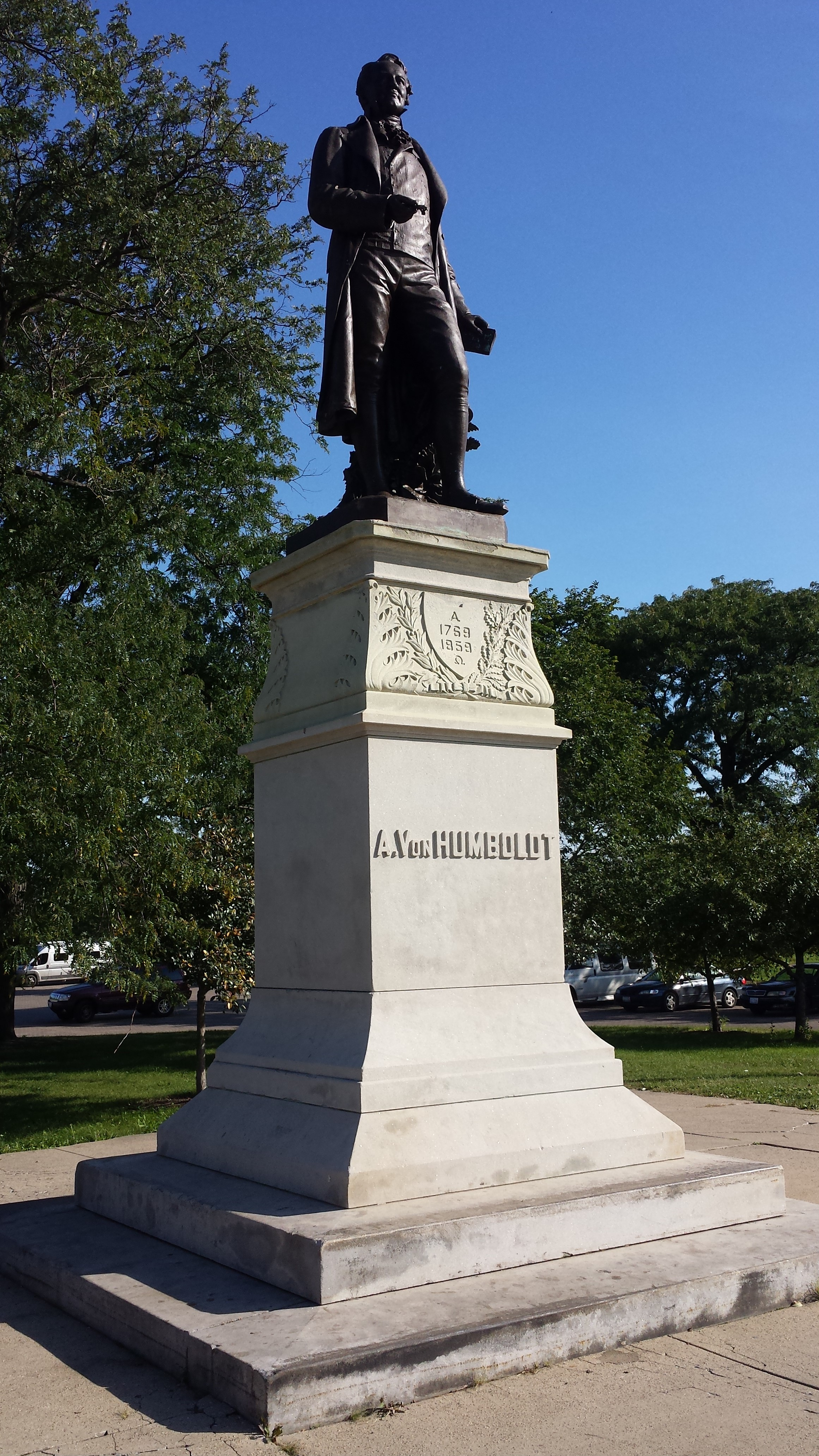
- Alexander von Humboldt statue (2014)
- Interactive map of Alexander von Humboldt statue
- Location: Humboldt Park, Chicago, Illinois, United States
- Coordinates: 41°54′19.73″N 87°42′5.29″W
- Designer: Felix Görling; H.C. Hoffman & Co. (pedestal)
- Builder: Gladenbeck foundry H.C. Hoffman & Co. (pedestal)
- Material: Bronze; Granite (pedestal)
- Height: 10 feet (3.0 m)
- Dedicated date: October 16, 1892
- Dedicated to: Alexander von Humboldt

The Alexander von Humboldt statue is a monumental statue in Chicago, Illinois, United States. Located in Humboldt Park, a major urban park in the Humboldt Park neighborhood, the statue depicts Alexander von Humboldt, a Prussian polymath and the park's namesake. The statue was dedicated in 1892.

== History ==
The park and surrounding neighborhood were named in honor of Alexander von Humboldt, a Prussian polymath who, among other things, made numerous scientific voyages throughout the Americas during the late 18th and early 19th centuries. Despite never having visited Chicago during any of his journeys, he became the park's namesake in 1869. According to Chicago's NPR affiliate, the name was chosen due to "ethnic politics", as German Americans made up a significant portion of the neighborhood's population and were considered a growing voting bloc in the politics of Chicago. The monument was paid for by Francis Dewes, a German-born brewer who is also known for the Francis J. Dewes House in Chicago.

The statue was dedicated on October 16, 1892. The unveiling ceremony, which saw speeches given in English, German, and Swedish, attracted approximately 20,000 spectators. The bronze figure of Humboldt was sculpted by a German sculptor named Felix Görling and was cast in the Gladenbeck foundry in Berlin. The pedestal was designed and made by H.C. Hoffman & Co., a Chicago-based company, using granite from Freeport, Maine. Notable speakers at the unveiling included Chicago Mayor Hempstead Washburne and University of Chicago professor Albion Woodbury Small. The statue is one of several of Humboldt erected in the United States during the 1800s, alongside statues in Philadelphia, St. Louis, and the Cleveland Cultural Gardens.

== Design ==
The monument features a bronze sculpture of Humboldt atop a granite pedestal, with the entire height of the monument being approximately 10 feet (3.0 m). Humboldt is posed as a lecturer, with a flower in his raised right hand and a book in his left hand, which is resting on a tree stump. A globe and other smaller symbols of some of the scientific fields Humboldt was involved in are present near his feet.

== See also ==
- 1892 in art

== Bibliography ==
- "Humboldt Park". Chicago Architecture Center.
- Andreas W. Daum, "Nation, Naturforschung und Monument: Humboldt-Denkmäler in Deutschland und den USA" [Humboldt monuments in Germany and the US]. Die Kunst der Geschichte: Historiographie, Ästhetik, Erzählung, ed. Martin Baumeister et al. Göttingen: Vandenhoeck & Ruprecht, 2009, 99‒124.
- Daum, Andreas W. (2024). Alexander von Humboldt: A Concise Biography. Princeton University Press. ISBN 978-0-691-24736-6.
- Pohlsander, Hans A. (2010). German Monuments in the Americas: Bonds Across the Atlantic. Peter Lang. ISBN 978-3-0343-0138-1 – via Google Books.
- Schmidt, John R. (November 16, 2011). "The story behind the Humboldt statue in Humboldt Park". WBEZ. Chicago Public Media.
- Simon, Andreas (1894). Chicago: The Garden City (2nd Revised ed.). Franz Gindele Printing Company – via Google Books.
