= Conrad Seipp Brewing Company =

Former Chicago brewery established in 1854 by Conrad Seipp

The Conrad Seipp Brewing Company
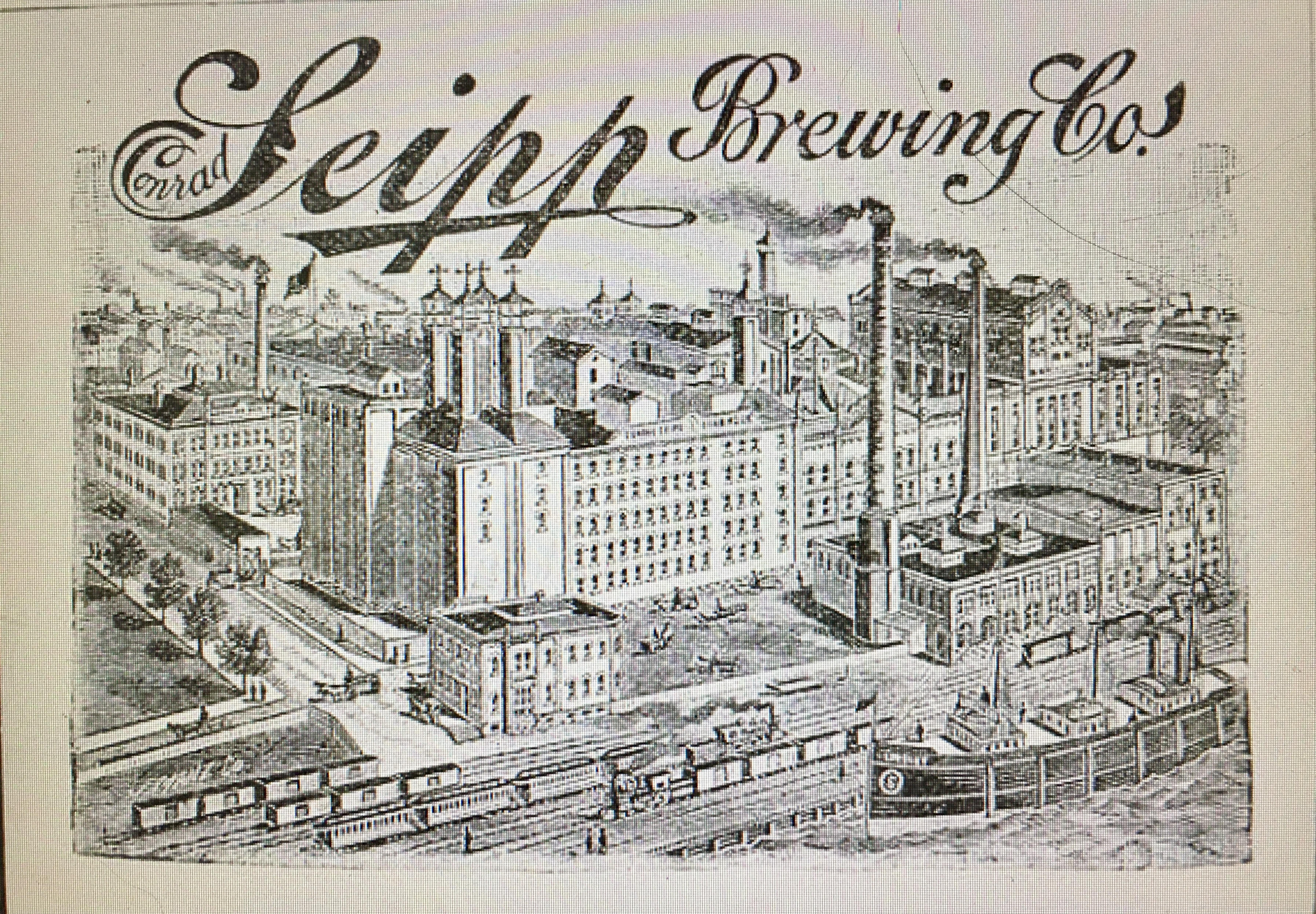
- Industry: Beverages
- Founded: 1854, 172 years ago
- Founder: Conrad Seipp
- Defunct: 1933
- Headquarters: Chicago, Illinois, United States
- Area served: Regional
- Products: Beer

The Conrad Seipp Brewing Company was established in 1854 by German immigrant Conrad Seipp in Chicago, Illinois. The brewery is notable for its prolific use of advertising, making it one of the most successful breweries of its era. It closed in 1933.

== History ==
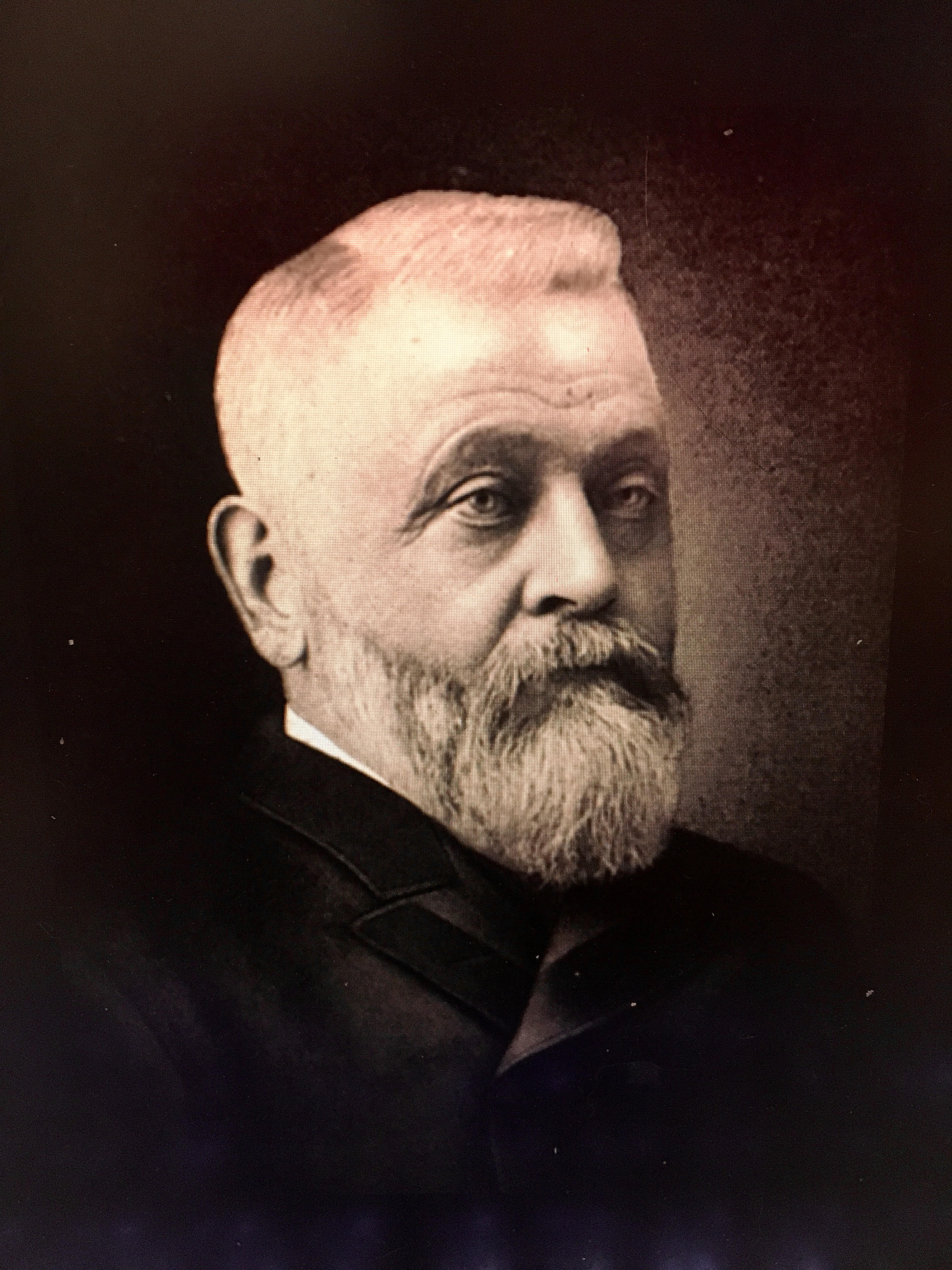
Conrad Seipp

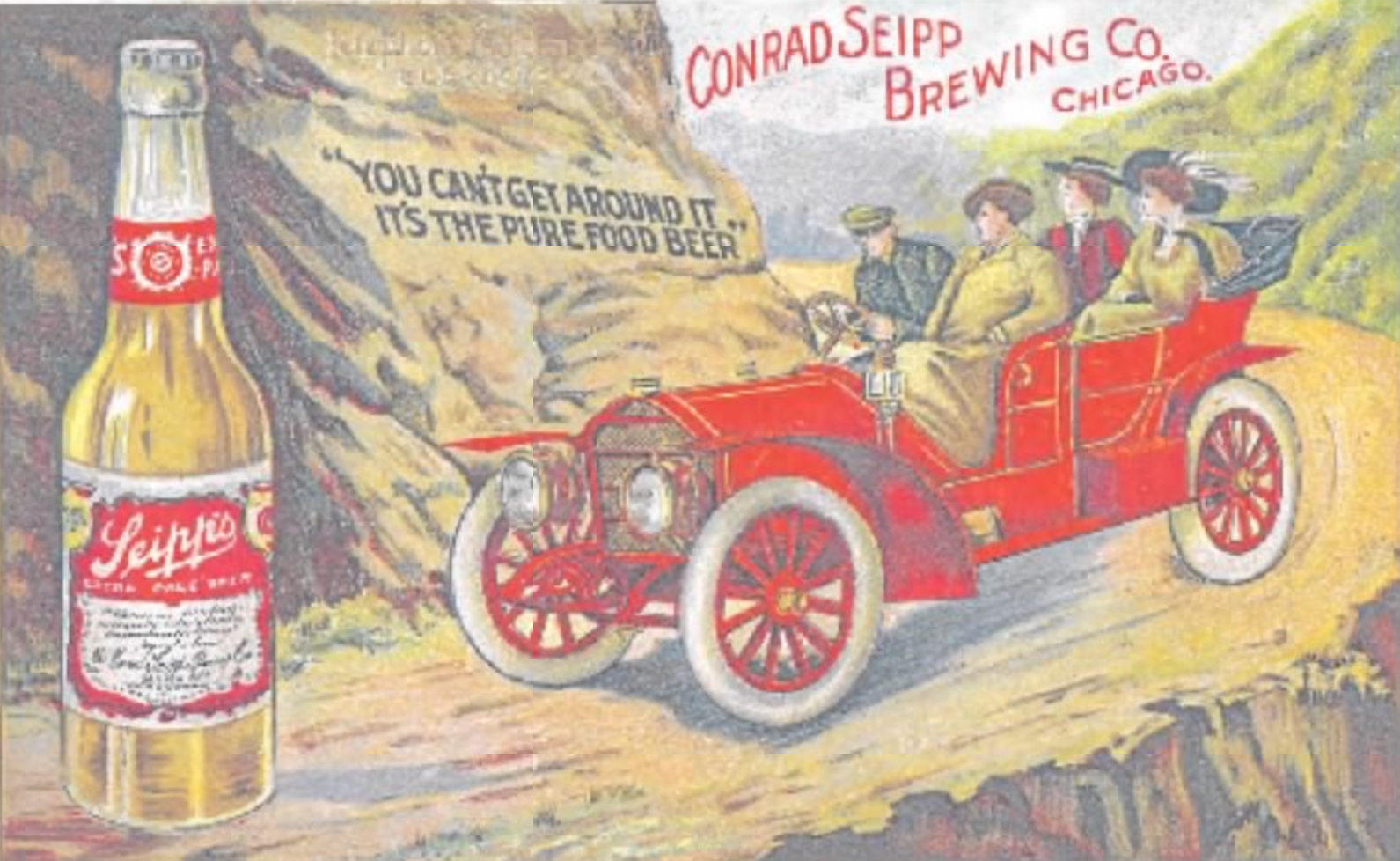
Conrad Seipp Brewing Company advertisement, circa 1910s

Conrad Seipp was born in Langen, Hessen, Germany on 28 September 1825. His early trade was that of a carpenter and joiner. During the failed German revolutions of 1848-9, Seipp was conscripted and served as a bodyguard for the Grand Duchess of Hessen. In 1849, he emigrated to the United States, arriving first in Rochester, NY—a city in the midst of its own extensive brewing history—where he married his first wife, Maria Teutsch. His stay in Rochester was short and the couple soon moved to Chicago, where Seipp first worked as the driver of a beer wagon for the Miller Brothers Brewery and later owned and operated his own hotel on the corner of Washington and Wells Streets.

In 1854, with the profit from the sale of his hotel, Seipp invested $18,000 to purchase a small brewery from Matthias Best on 14th street, which burned down within the year. Seipp immediately built a new brick brewery on 27th Street near Lake Michigan with underground cellars, a malt floor at ground level, and a 2nd floor living quarters for his family. By the end of his first year Seipp had 6 employees and was producing more than 1,000 barrels.

In 1858 Seipp partnered with Frederick Lehmann, creating the firm Seipp & Lehmann. By the end of the next decade, it was one of Chicago's leading brewers, with about 50 employees producing more than 50,000 barrels of beer per year.

The brewery survived the Great Chicago Fire and the partnership continued until Lehmann's death in 1872. Seipp purchased the interest of the Lehmann heirs and, in 1876, incorporated the Conrad Seipp Brewing Company. By the end of the 1870s, the brewery was producing more than 100,000 barrels per year, making it the 5th largest brewery in the United States at the time. In 1889, it produced 230,000 barrels.

After Conrad Seipp's death in 1890, the Conrad Seipp, West Side, and F. J. Dewes breweries—along with the L. C. Huck and George Bullen malt houses—were amalgamated to form the City of Chicago Brewing and Malting Company, though each firm continued under its own name. By the turn of the century the Conrad Seipp Brewing Company had grown into one of the largest breweries in the country, with an annual output of 240,000 barrels.

During Prohibition, the brewery continued to operate, brewing both soda and near beer, however the brewery closed in 1933, just before the passage of the 21st amendment, which repealed Prohibition. The brewery buildings were demolished 1933, in part to make way for an expansion of Michael Reese Hospital's campus.

=== Reintroduction ===
In 2020, Seipp's great-great-great-granddaughter, Laurin Mack—in conjunction with Metropolitan Brewing, a firm specializing in German-style lagers, reintroduced Seipp's Extra Pale, a pre-Prohibition style pilsner and Seipp's Columbia Special Release, an interpretation of a Bock beer the Conrad Seipp Brewing Company specially brewed for the 1893 Chicago World's Fair.

== See also ==
- Beer in the United States
- List of breweries in Illinois
- Lager Beer Riot
