= A. P. Johnson House =

Historic house in Wisconsin, United States

- U.S. National Register of Historic Places
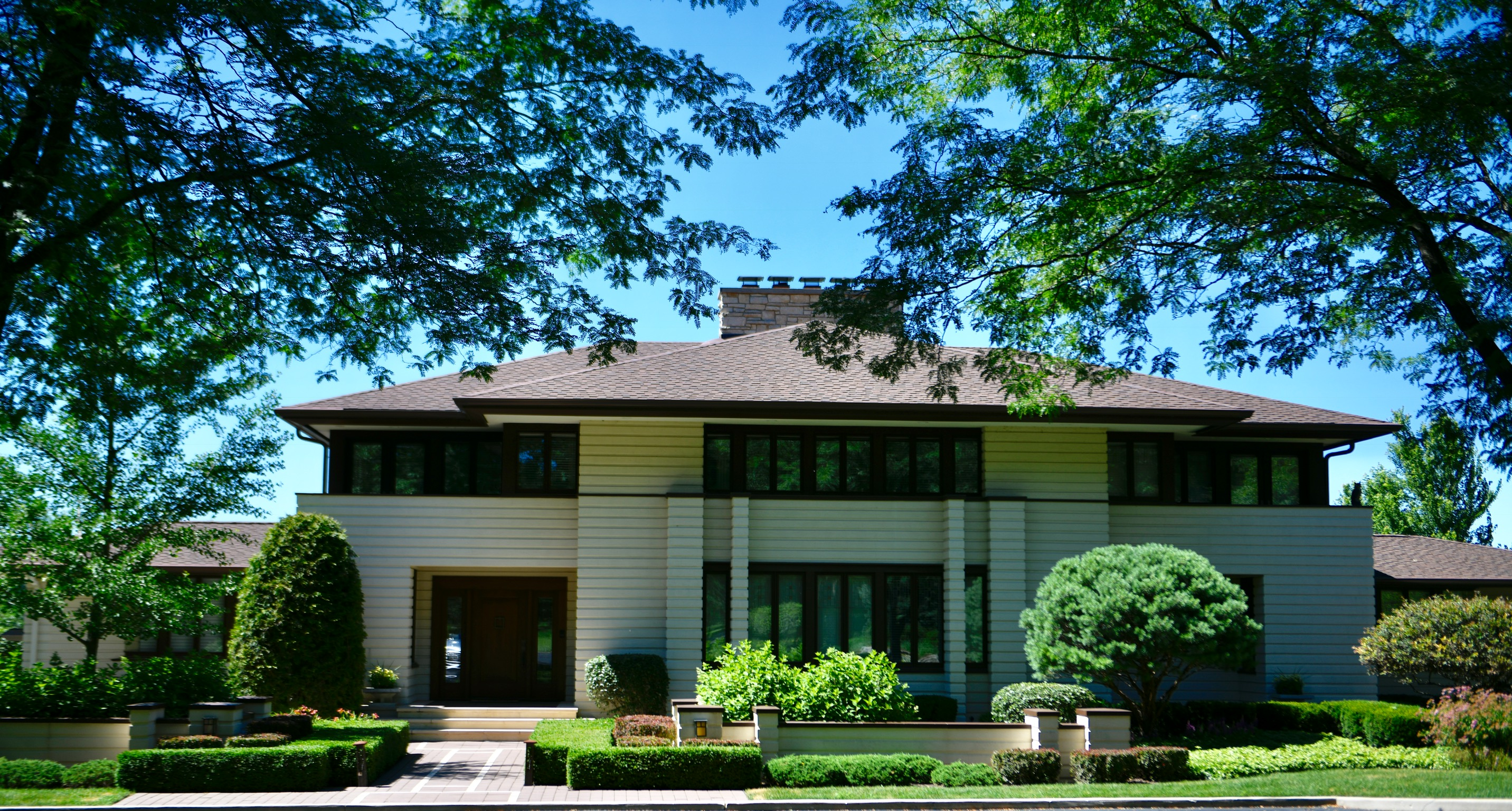

- Location within Wisconsin
- Interactive map showing the location of A.P. Johnson House
- Location: Delavan, Wisconsin
- Coordinates: 42°35′26.82″N 88°37′0.27″W
- Built: 1905
- Architect: Frank Lloyd Wright
- Architectural style: Prairie School
- NRHP reference No.: 82000715
- Added to NRHP: July 9, 1982

The A. P. Johnson House, also known as Campbell Residence, is a Frank Lloyd Wright-designed Prairie School home that was constructed in Delavan, Wisconsin, U.S., in 1905. It was listed on the National Register of Historic Places in 1982.

The Johnson house sits on a 6-acre lot on the south shore of Lake Delavan, on a small wooded hill with a view of the water. Wright designed it as he was shifting from more classical designs to fully developed Prairie style like the 1906 Robie House.

Characteristic elements of Prairie Style are the low-pitched hip roofs with wide eaves, the raised central mass, bands of casement windows, and horizontal siding. One-story porches extend from each end parallel to the lake, like wings of the house. The windows contain leaded colored glass, in a decorative pattern that repeats. The house is clad in horizontal tongue-and-groove wood siding, which Wright often used on small cottages. The roof was originally covered with wood shingles, but they have been replaced with asphalt.

The interior included a large central living area with dining room, living room and study more or less open to each other. A large fireplace of Roman brick heats the living room. (The house was originally heated only by its fireplaces.) Bedrooms are upstairs. Much of the interior was updated from 1980 to 1982, but the exterior is little changed from 1905.

Wright intended for the exterior of the house to be finished in a dark natural color, but the house was instead painted white, to his displeasure.

== See also ==
- National Register of Historic Places listings in Walworth County, Wisconsin
- List of Frank Lloyd Wright works
