= Black Point (Linn, Wisconsin) =

Historic house in Wisconsin, United States

- U.S. National Register of Historic Places
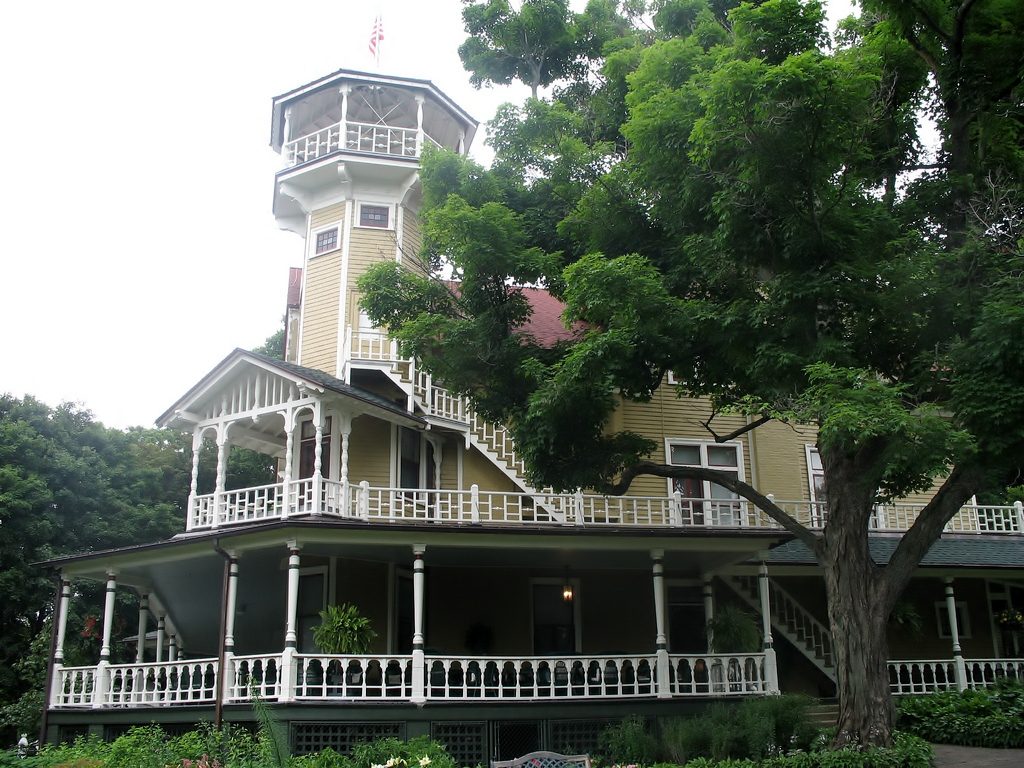

- Location within Wisconsin Location within the United States
- Interactive map showing the location of Black Point
- Location: 580 S. Lake Shore Dr. (Pier 580), Linn, Wisconsin
- Coordinates: 42°33′29″N 88°30′39″W
- Area: 6 acres (2.4 ha)
- Built: 1888
- Architect: Adolph Cudell
- Architectural style: Queen Anne
- NRHP reference No.: 94001147
- Added to NRHP: September 15, 1994

Black Point is an estate on the south shore of Geneva Lake in Linn, Wisconsin, United States, near the city of Lake Geneva, Wisconsin that was built in 1888 as a summer home by Conrad Seipp, a beer tycoon from Chicago. It has also been known as Conrad and Catherine Seipp Summer House and as Die Loreley. It is currently a museum.

== Style ==
The Queen Anne style mansion features a nautical-themed, four-story, "crow's nest" observation tower, which can be seen from many points on the lake; the property also features post-civil war-era furniture.

== History ==
It was designed by Adolph Cudell for Conrad Seipp, successful beer maker from Chicago and built in 1888. It was listed in the National Register of Historic Places in 1994.

The state of Wisconsin owns the property and leases it to the Black Point Historic Preserve, a nonprofit organization which manages the property for public tours, which began in June 2007.

== Museum ==
The estate and its grounds, including 620 feet of shoreline, are protected from future development by a conservation easement co-held by the Geneva Lake Conservancy, a local not-for-profit conservation organization, and the Preserve.

In 2013, the site became a property of the state of Wisconsin, and Wisconsin Historical Society. Great grandson of the original owner, William O. Petersen, donated the site in a process beginning in 1993 and was completed on September 26, 2005.

The terms of its use as a museum were settled between the state and neighbors in Lake Geneva who feared tour buses filling the area. The museum is accessible by boat on Lake Geneva, which is how it was originally accessed, there having been no road access in 1888.
