= Heart Prairie Lutheran Church =

Historic church in Wisconsin, United States

Coordinates: 42°45′23.5″N 88°42′07.2″W

- U.S. National Register of Historic Places
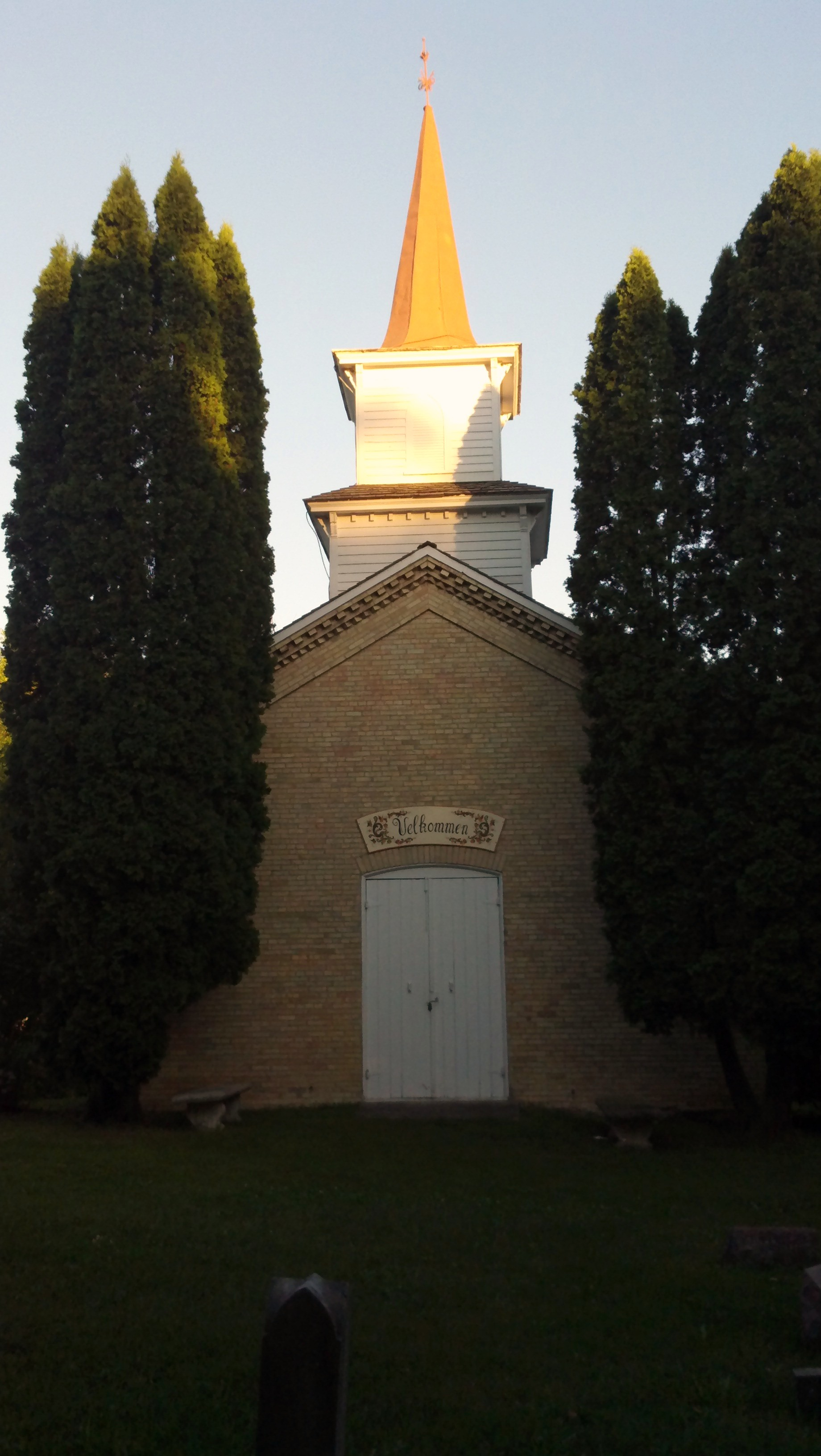
- Entrance to the church
- Nearest city: Whitewater, Wisconsin
- Built: 1857
- NRHP reference No.: 74000133
- Added to NRHP: 1974-12-27

Heart Prairie Lutheran Church of Whitewater, Wisconsin, United States, was a historic church organized in 1844 by pioneer Lutheran minister, Claus Lauritz Clausen.

Before the church was built, services were held under oak trees, in the Lyman School, and in log cabins. One of those early log cabins, owned by Gundar Halvorsen, now sits on the campus of the University of Wisconsin-Whitewater. The Norwegian pioneers began hauling brick by oxcart to build the present church, which was completed between 1855 and 1857. About this time the congregation joined with congregations at Whitewater, Palmyra and Sugar Creek to call the same Lutheran pastor.

During the later 19th century the congregation grew to over 100 members. After 1880 an organist played a reed pump organ that led the congregational hymns. The Norwegian language was used in the church until 1902. It was only then that the English language was introduced into the services, but not used exclusively until 1920. During the early 1900s membership began declining as a result of families moving out of the Heart Prairie area. Finally in 1948, because of dwindling membership, the congregation merged with First English Lutheran Church of Whitewater.

The church, which became known for its historical, architectural and religious features, is included on the National Register of Historic Places. Historically this church may be the oldest Norwegian Lutheran Church in America still being used in its original state. Architecturally the church is a lasting example of pioneer building. Brick was used not only to build walls, but also to supply ornamental and decorative details.

== Other sources ==
- Froemming, Larry F. The Norwegians and Their Church: A history of the Heart Prairie Lutheran Church, Whitewater, Wisconsin ( Beloit, Wisconsin. 1975)
