= Metropolitan Brewing =

- Industry: Alcoholic beverage
- Founded: December 2008
- Founders: Doug Hurst and Tracy Hurst
- Defunct: December 18, 2023
- Headquarters: Chicago, Illinois, USA
- Number of locations: (1) Avondale neighborhood, Chicago, IL
- Area served: Illinois, Wisconsin
- Products: Beer
- Owners: Doug Hurst and Tracy Hurst
- Number of employees: 6
- Website: metrobrewing.com

Metropolitan Brewing was a brewery located in Chicago, Illinois, founded in 2008 by then-husband and wife team Doug and Tracy Hurst. It was originally located in a converted warehouse in a historically industrial area of the Ravenswood neighborhood of Chicago. In 2017, they moved to a larger facility with a taproom at 3057 N Rockwell Street in Chicago.

Metropolitan focused exclusively on brewing lagers in the traditional German style, the only craft brewery in Chicago to do so. Doug Hurst earned a brewing diploma at the Siebel Institute of Technology.

In December 2019, Metropolitan became embroiled in a long-running dispute with their landlord over rent and the square-footage of their building, saying the lease they agreed to was 24,000 square feet but their landlord instead listed it as 33,000 square feet in the contact. As a result, they ceased paying their full rent. In October 2023, the brewery filed for bankruptcy, noting slow sales and unsustainable debt. The brewery closed permanently on December 18th, 2023.

== Beers ==
Metropolitan Brewing's Current Beers
Name	Style	ABV %	IBU	Original gravity	Offering	Notes
Dynamo	Vienna Lager	5.8	29	13.8° Plato	Year-Round	Uses Vienna malt and Vanguard and Liberty hops
Flywheel	Munich Pils	5.2	45	13° Plato	Year-Round	
Krankshaft	Kölsch	5.0	28	12° Plato	Year-Round	Recipe includes wheat and Santiam hops
Iron Works	Alt	5.8	45	13° Plato	Year-Round	An update to the I-Beam recipe. Uses Mt. Hood and Vanguard hops.
Generator	Doppelbock	8.2	25	18° Plato	Seasonal	Winter
Arc Welder	Dunkel Rye	6.0	28	13.7° Plato	Seasonal	Spring
Afterburner	Märzen/Oktoberfest	6.1	25	14.2° Plato	Seasonal	Fall

Metropolitan Brewing's Archived Beers
Name	Style	ABV %	IBU	Original gravity	Notes
I-Beam	Alt	5.3	50	12.6° Plato	
