= Halverson Log Cabin =

Historic house in Wisconsin, United States

- U.S. National Register of Historic Places
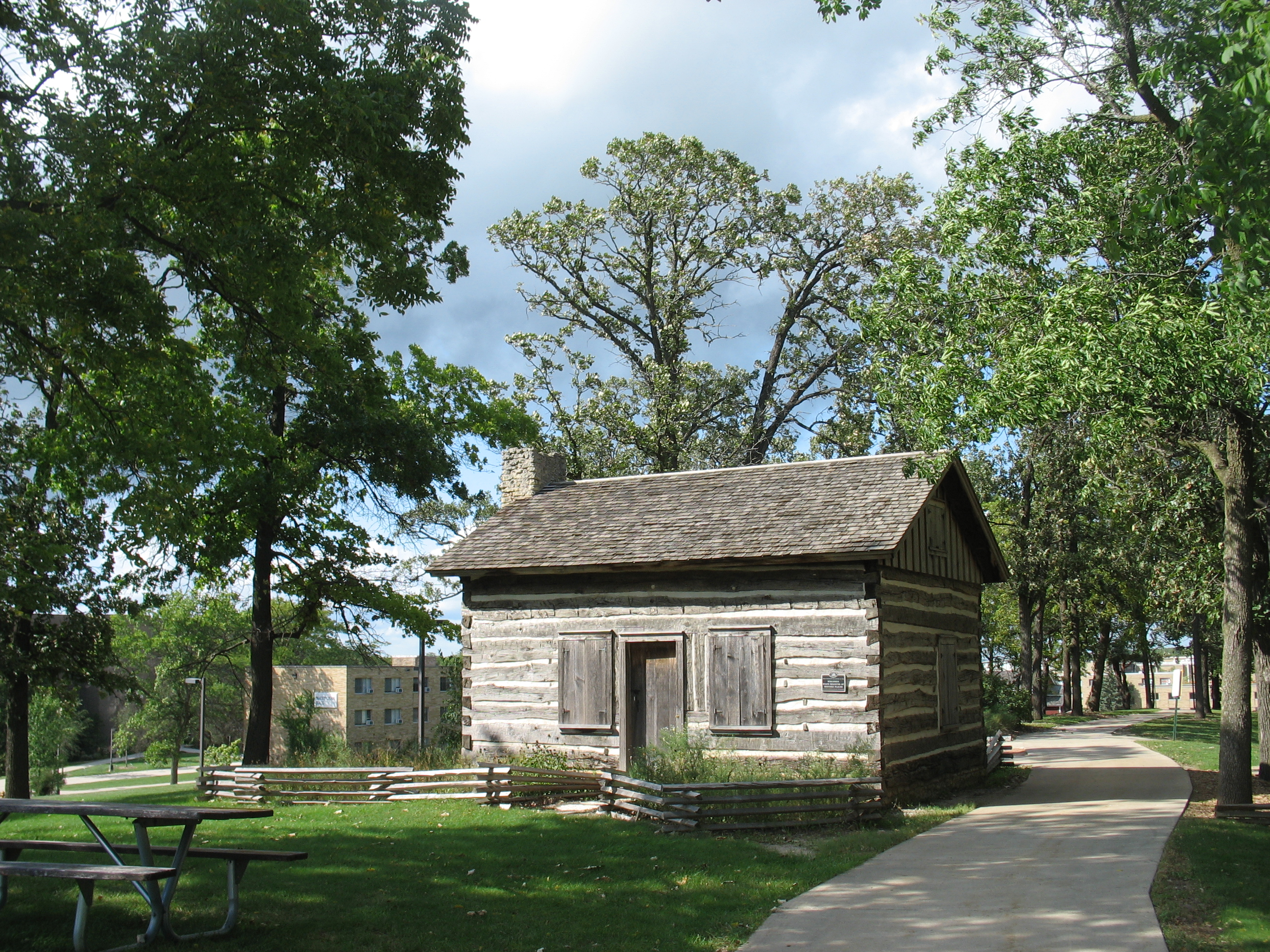
- Halverson Log Cabin

- Location within Wisconsin Location within the United States
- Coordinates: 42.83726°N 88.74415°W
- Area: less than one acre
- Built: 1846
- Built by: Gullik Halverson
- NRHP reference No.: 85000070
- Added to NRHP: January 8, 1985

The Halverson Log Cabin is located on the campus of the University of Wisconsin-Whitewater. It was added to the National Register of Historic Places in 1985.

It is a one-story 16 by 20.5 feet (4.9 m × 6.2 m) log cabin which was built in 1846 by Norwegian immigrant Gullik Halverson, who came to Wisconsin in 1845 when 23 years old. He came with his parents from Valebo, Norway.

It is built of apparently hand-hewn logs, with dovetailed corners.

It was moved to its current location in 1907.
