= Reynolds-Weed House =

Historic house in Wisconsin, United States

- U.S. National Register of Historic Places
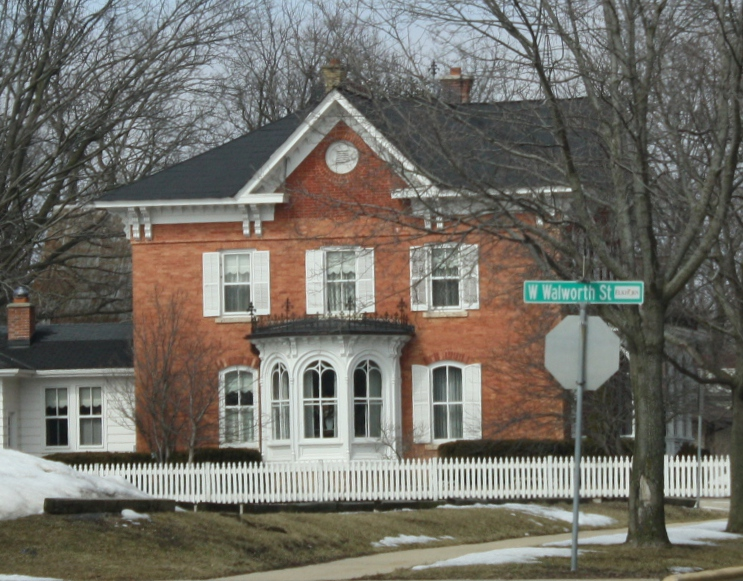

- Location within Wisconsin Location within the United States
- Location: 12 N. Church St., Elkhorn, Wisconsin
- Coordinates: 42°40′21″N 88°32′47″W
- Area: less than one acre
- Built: 1850
- Architectural style: Italianate
- NRHP reference No.: 83003429
- Added to NRHP: March 31, 1983

The Reynolds-Weed House (also known as the Moore House) is a historic house located in Elkhorn, Wisconsin. It was built as the Elkhorn Union School in 1850, then later modified. It is locally significant as one of Elkhorn's finest examples of the Victorian/Italianate period of construction.

It was added to the National Register of Historic Places on March 31, 1983.

Its NRHP nomination describes it: "Nearly square in dimension and symmetrical in design, the present building is a large, two-story Italianate house of built of salmon colored brick. Its broad truncated hipped roof, covered with stamped tin shingles, is intersected by center attic-level pediments above all elevations."
