= Elkhorn Municipal Building =

- U.S. National Register of Historic Places
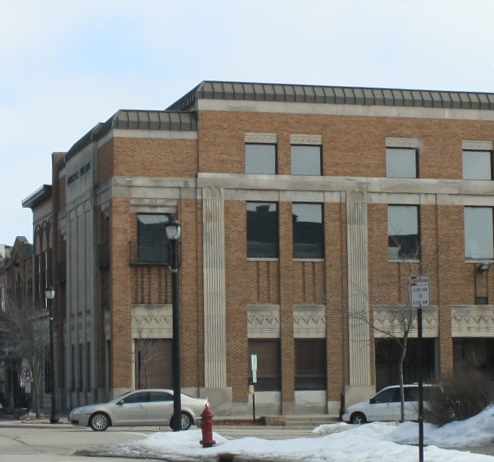
- Elkhorn Municipal Building

- Location within Wisconsin Location within the United States
- Location: 9 S. Broad St. Elkhorn, Wisconsin
- Coordinates: 42.67157°N 88.54451°W
- Built: 1930–31
- Architect: Edward Tough
- Architectural style: Art Deco
- NRHP reference No.: 12000491
- Added to NRHP: August 7, 2012

The Elkhorn Municipal Building, located at 9 South Broad Street, is the main city government building in Elkhorn, Wisconsin. The building was constructed in 1930–31 to replace the previous city hall, which had become too small for the city's needs. Architect Edward Tough designed the Art Deco building. It was added to the National Register of Historic Places in 2012.

== History ==
Elkhorn commissioned a new city hall in 1930 to replace its previous building, which was built in 1884. As the city added new services, the old building was no longer large enough to fit every function of government. In particular, the light and water department needed space for electrical appliances; like many private electric companies of the time, the light department sold appliances, which had become quite popular by 1930. The fire department also needed space to house both of its fire trucks.

The city approved funding for the new building in February 1930, and construction began later that year. An additional bond was raised for the building that August. The final cost of the building was $73,000. After delays due to a labor dispute and replacing the building's contractor, the new city hall opened in September 1931. In addition to its government facilities, the new building included a large public auditorium, public restrooms, and a meeting place for the local American Legion post. The building has housed Elkhorn's city government since then, though the fire department later moved to a separate building and the light department discontinued its appliance sales.

The building was added to the National Register of Historic Places on August 7, 2012.

== Architecture ==
Architect Edward Tough of Madison designed the three-story brick and limestone building in the Art Deco style. The building is Elkhorn's only professional Art Deco design. The main facade features a series of fluted two-story limestone pilasters below a stone panel engraved to read "MUNICIPAL BUILDING". Stone panels with a zigzag and line pattern separate the first and second stories, and a stone cornice divides the second and third floors.
