= Kate Elderkin =

American art historian

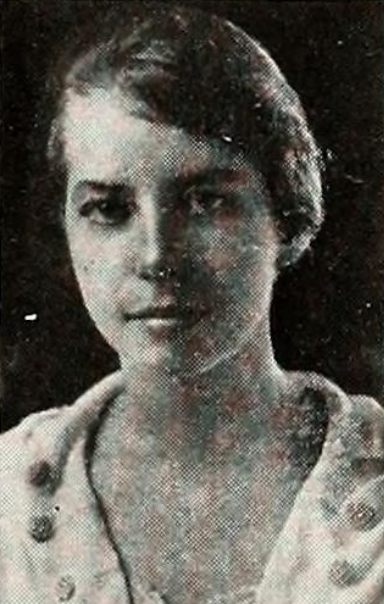
- Kate Denny McKnight, later Elderkin, from the 1919 yearbook of Vassar College
- Born: Kate Denny McKnight; February 14, 1897; San Diego, California, U.S.
- Died: February 16, 1962 (aged 65); Princeton, New Jersey, U.S.
- Occupations: Art historian, archaeologist
- Relatives: Elizabeth Pierce Blegen (cousin)

Kate Denny McKnight Elderkin (February 14, 1897 – February 16, 1962) was an American art historian and archaeologist. She taught at Vassar College and was an editor of the American Journal of Archaeology with her husband, George W. Elderkin.

== Early life and education ==
Kate Denny McKnight was born in San Diego and raised in Riverside, California, the daughter of Woodruff McKnight and Cora Burdon McKnight. Her father died when she was very young; her mother remarried, to Arthur Robinson Ocheltree. Both her father and her stepfather owned orange orchards in California. Her younger brother Arthur Ocheltree became an opera singer in the 1930s, and younger brother John Ocheltree was a Rhodes Scholar and a diplomat. She graduated from Vassar College in 1919, and earned a master's degree in 1920. She completed doctoral studies at Radcliffe College in 1922. Her cousin Elizabeth Denny Pierce Blegen was an archaeologist.

== Career ==
McKnight taught art at Vassar College, and participated in excavations in North Africa and in the Greek Islands as a young woman. From 1925 to 1931, she edited the book review section of the American Journal of Archaeology, while her husband was editor in chief. She spoke about archaeological topics to women's clubs. Her studies of everyday objects in antiquity, including jointed dolls and buttons, drew attention beyond her academic field. In 1944 she published a travel memoir, From Tripoli to Marrakesh.

== Publications ==
- "Chachrylion and His Vases" (1924)
- "The Ulysses Panels by Piero di Cosimo at Vassar College" (1924)
- "Aphrodite Worship on a Minoan Gem" (1925)
- "An Alexandrian Carved Casket of the Fourth Century" (1926)
- "Buttons and their use on Greek Garments" (1928)
- "Jointed Dolls in Antiquity" (1930)
- "The Contribution of Women to Ornament in Antiquity" (1936)
- From Tripoli to Marrakech (1944)

== Personal life ==
McKnight married archaeologist George Wicker Elderkin in 1924, at Union Theological Seminary, with Harry Emerson Fosdick performing the ceremony. They had three children. In 1936 she made a roadtrip from New Jersey to California with her brother Arthur and his colleague, Emanuel Marti-Folgado. She died in 1965, at the age of 62, at her home in Princeton, New Jersey.
