= Redwood Cottage =

Historic house in Wisconsin, United States

- U.S. National Register of Historic Places
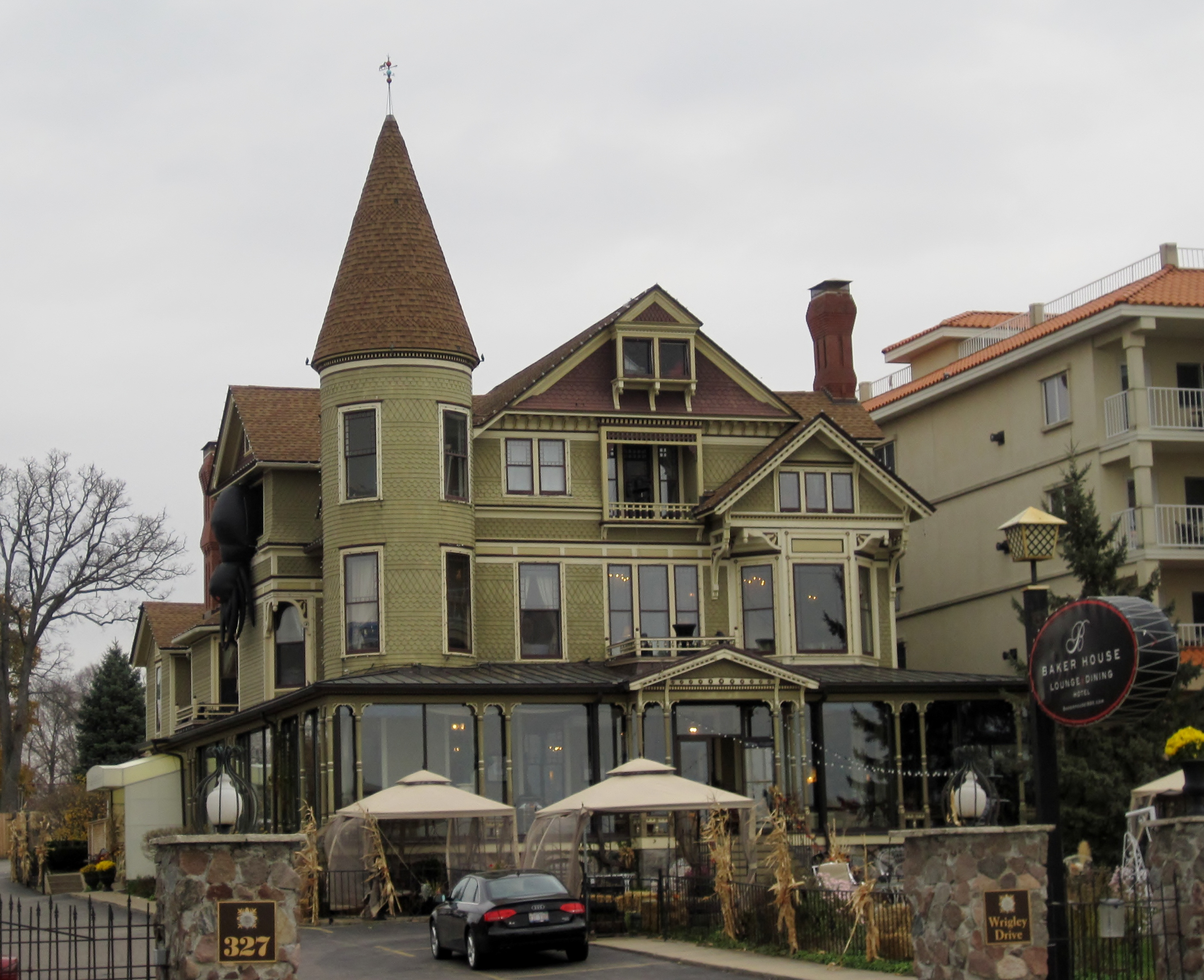
- Redwood Cottage

- Location within Wisconsin Location within the United States
- Location: 327 Wrigley Drive; Lake Geneva, Wisconsin
- Coordinates: 42°35′16″N 88°25′56″W
- Area: less than one acre
- Built: 1885
- Architectural style: Queen Anne
- NRHP reference No.: 84003796
- Added to NRHP: September 07, 1984

Redwood Cottage is a Queen Anne-styled mansion built in 1885 as a summer cottage in Lake Geneva, Wisconsin. Later it served as a sanitarium and later as a hotel. In 1984 the house was listed on the National Register of Historic Places.

Charles Minton Baker was a pioneer of Walworth county who arrived in 1839 and served as district attorney and in other public roles including representative to the Territorial Council. In 1870 he built or bought the brick Italianate house at 335 Wrigley Drive, known as the Baker homestead. Charles' son Robert Hall Baker was a part-owner of J.I. Case among other investments, served as mayor of Racine, and played a key role in bringing the railroad to Lake Geneva in 1871. Robert died wealthy in 1882, leaving his widow Emily and four children.

Widow Emily redecorated the old Baker homestead in 1884, both for her children and for others in the Baker family. Then in 1885 she had her own "summer cottage" built next door - the subject of this article. That July the Geneva Lake Herald wrote:

The new Baker cottage being built on the east shore will be one of the handsomest about the lake when finished and the grounds are arranged. The design is not only unique but tasty and it will add much to the beauty of that shore.

The 17,000+ square foot, 30 room, Queen Anne style mansion is a frame building, two stories tall plus attic. The roofline is complex, with gabled dormers, large corbelled chimneys, and a round corner tower with a witch's cap roof. Bay windows and an inset balcony add to the visual interest, and the upper surfaces are decorated with different patterns of wood shingles. A large veranda wraps around the first story.

Inside, doors and windows are trimmed in redwood - hence the original name "Redwood Cottage." The floor plan is central corridor with rooms on both sides. On the first floor two parlors are on one side of the hall and three smaller rooms on the other side. A grand staircase connects the floors, lit by multicolored stained glass windows. The third floor was originally unfinished. The main rooms have fireplaces, twelve in all, some oak and some cherry, with mantles in a Victorian Renaissance style different from the Queen Anne around them.

Emily Baker summered at the cottage until she died in 1894. In 1897 Celinda Walkup bought the house for $15,000, and operated it as a sanitorium connected to the Lakeside Sanitarium next door in the former Lake Geneva Seminary. This sanitorium was one of many founded by Dr. Oscar A. King of Chicago, a pioneer neurologist. King's sanitariums primarily treated psychiatric problems, but could serve as general hospital facilities. This building, called "Lakeside Cottage," kept the feel of a private home, and offered recreational and social activities for the patients. It functioned as a sanitorium until 1925.

In 1926 Mr. Finsky bought the building and operated it as Lakeside Hotel until 1942. At that point Lloyd Barnard bought it and operated it as the St. Moritz Hotel, pitching a "Switzerland in America" idea with the Luzern Hotel next door. More recently, the mansion has been refashioned as a high-end B&B/restaurant.
