= Elkhorn Band Shell =

- U.S. National Register of Historic Places
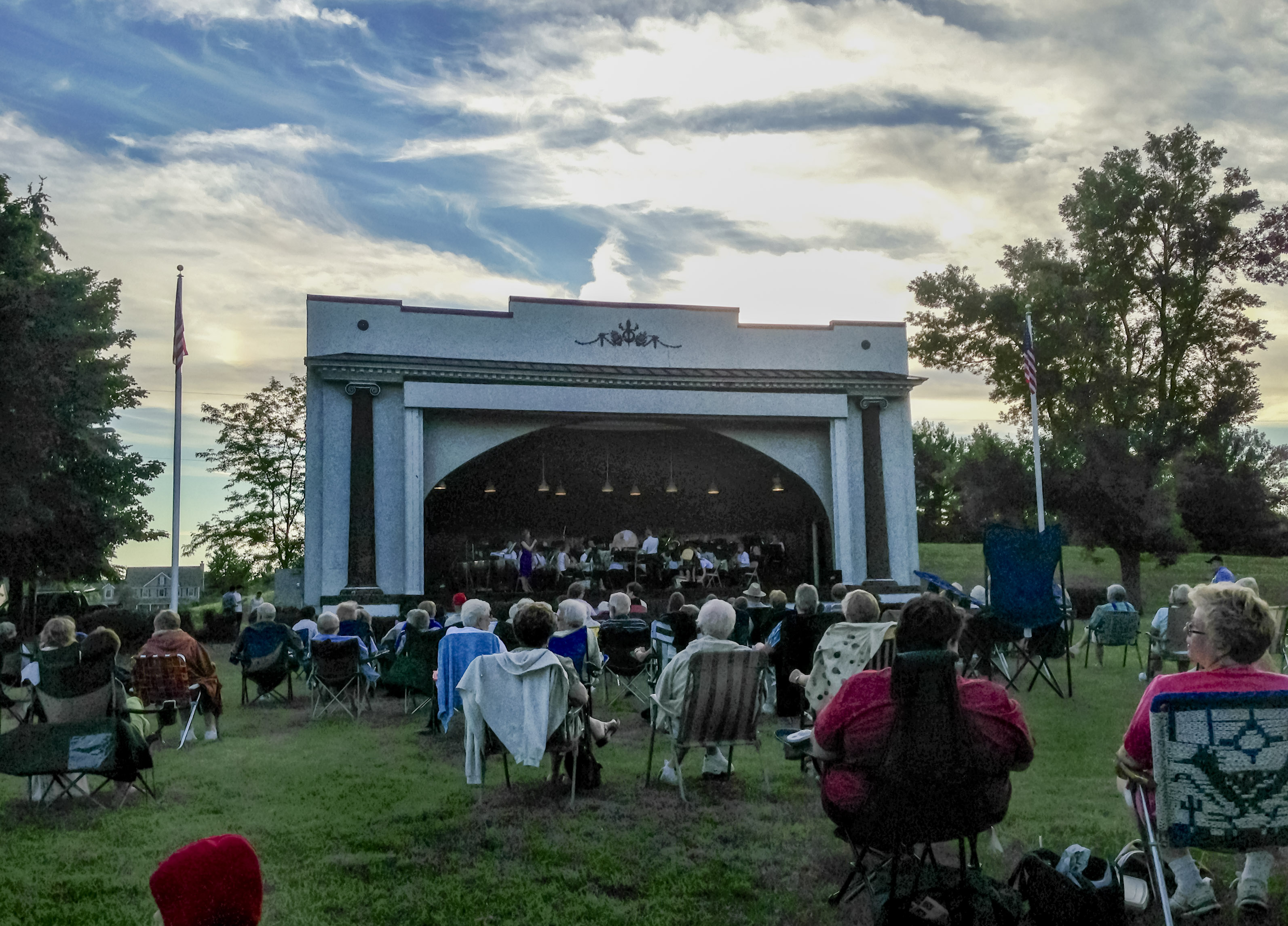
- The Holton-Elkhorn Band performing at the Elkhorn Band Shell

- Location within Wisconsin
- Location: Elkhorn, Wisconsin
- Coordinates: 42.6678°N 88.5563°W
- Built: 1926; 100 years ago
- Built by: Jake Bauerman
- Architectural style: Classical Revival
- NRHP reference No.: 12000490

Significant dates
- Moved: 1962–63
- Added to NRHP: 2012-08-07

The Elkhorn Band Shell is a band shell located in Sunset Park in Elkhorn, Wisconsin, US. It was built in 1926 for $5000 to house the Holton-Elkhorn band, after the Frank Holton Company moved there in 1918. Its design was based on another shell located in Mount Morris, Illinois, after a design by G. Pheby of Phoenix, Arizona. Around 4,000 people came to the opening concert.

It was originally located in the courthouse square, but was moved to Sunset Park in 1962 after the courthouse was expanded. The community raised $5,000 for the move, rather than allow the shell to be razed for materials.
