= Francis J. Dewes House =

Historic house in Chicago, Illinois

- U.S. National Register of Historic Places
- Chicago Landmark
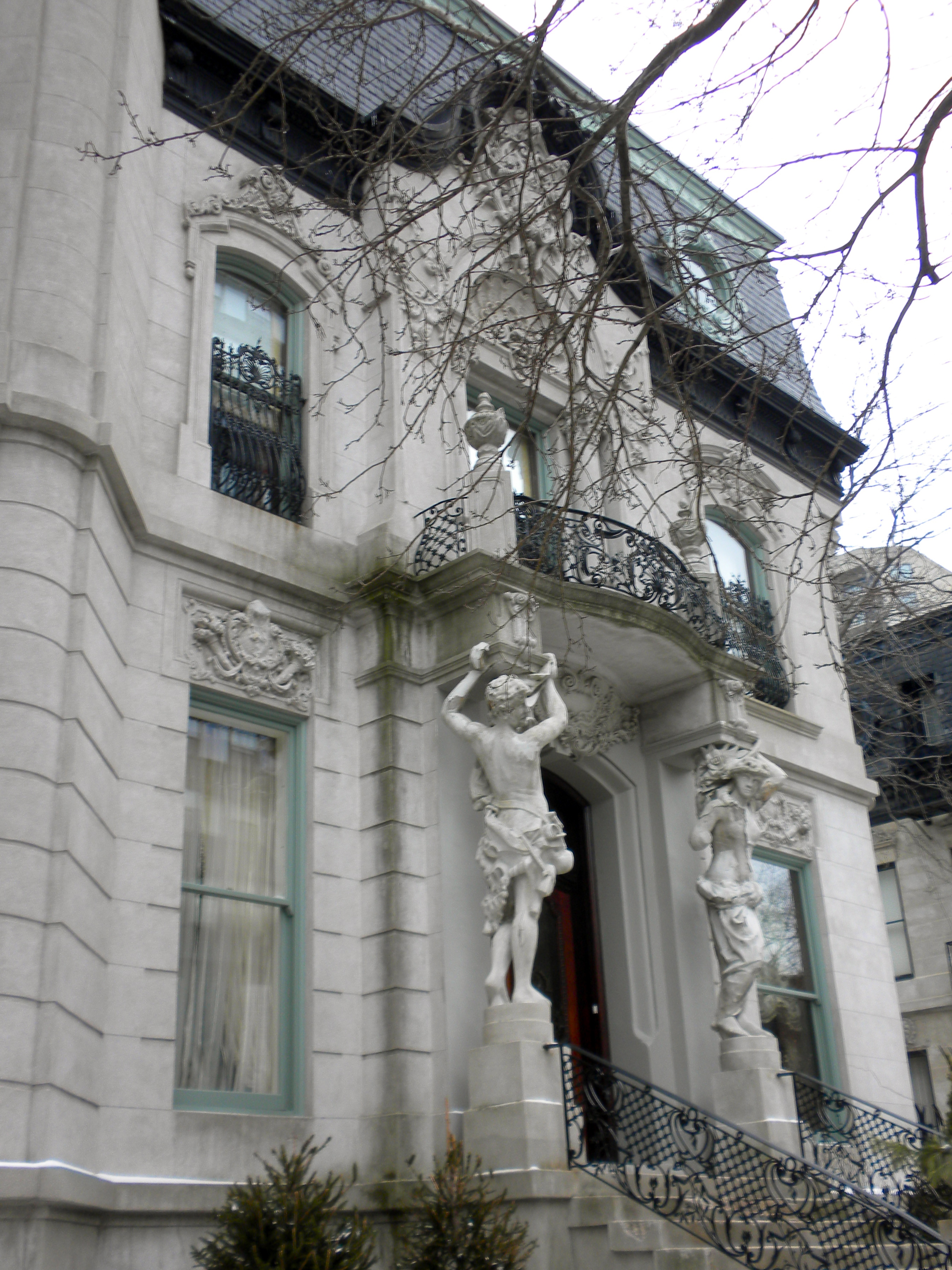

- Location within Illinois Location within the United States
- Interactive map showing the location for Francis J. Dewe House
- Location: 503 West Wrightwood Avenue, Chicago, Illinois, United States
- Coordinates: 41°55′50″N 87°38′30″W
- Built: 1896
- Architectural style: Second Empire
- NRHP reference No.: 73000694

Significant dates
- Added to NRHP: 1971
- Designated CHICL: June 12, 1974

The Francis J. Dewes House is a house located at 503 West Wrightwood Avenue in Chicago, Illinois, United States. The house was built in 1896 by Adolph Cudell and Arthur Hercz for a brewer Francis J. Dewes. The building's exterior is designed in a Central European Baroque Revival style.

The home was added to the National Register of Historic Places on August 14, 1973. It was designated as a Chicago Landmark on June 12, 1974. The home of Dewes's brother, August, located next door; was designated a Chicago Landmark in 2005. A pair of Chicago Landmark plaques for each home can be found on a pedestal in front of the Francis J. Dewes house.

Past owners and residents include Chuck Renslow and Dom Orejudos, the latter of whom housed his art studio on the third floor. Chicago Mayor Richard J. Daley invited Chuck Renslow to a 1974 ceremony celebrating the building's landmark designation.

The mansion went for sale in 2011 with an asking price of $9.9 million. It never sold and is currently owned by a property management firm called Structure Management Midwest. In 2013, its owner, Fred Latsko, listed it for $12.5 million.

== Interior ==
The mansion is three story Baroque style with two caryatids supporting the balcony over the main entrance. There are many figures and ornamental groups carved in the Bedford stone exterior of the building. Ornamental iron, hand-wrought, forms the balconies, window trim, porches, and railings; all in lavish detail of the Baroque style. There is a mansard roof with hand wrought copper fence surround. The exterior of the building is considered to be the Louis XV style that later spread to all the capitals of Europe. The large stained glass window which extends from the main stairway landing of the building up to the second floor is the work of a famous Belgian artist with figures and flowers in a springtime motif. The artist was engaged to design a window to fit the opening and came to Chicago especially to work out the details and returned to Belgium to personally supervise the firing of the glass and making of the window. On the first floor of the elegant interior of this building one immediately notices upon entering the foyer the huge fireplace on the East wall with marble columns facing the magnificent staircase leading to the second floor; immediately ahead is the wishing well equipped with running water and statue. The floors are Italian Mosaic and marble arranged in panels with overlay of gilded ornamental plaster molding gracing the walls.
