= Whitewater Hotel =

- U.S. National Register of Historic Places
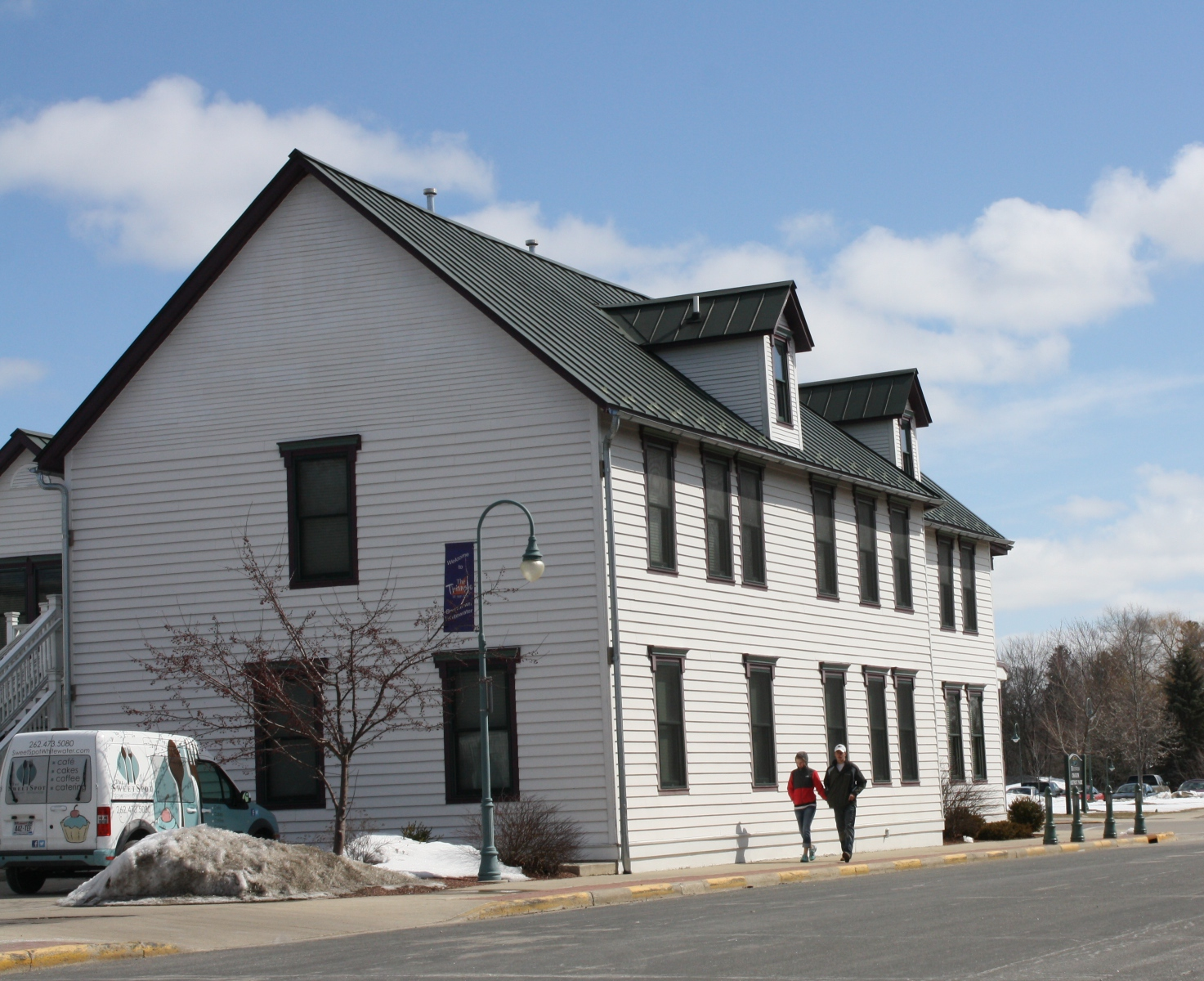

- Location within Wisconsin
- Location: 226 W. Whitewater St., Whitewater, Wisconsin
- Coordinates: 42°49′56.71″N 88°43′58.94″W
- Area: less than 1 acre (0.40 ha)
- Built: 1894
- Architectural style: Queen Anne
- NRHP reference No.: 09001273
- Added to NRHP: January 21, 2010

The Whitewater Hotel in Whitewater, Wisconsin was built in 1894.

It was renovated in 2006.

According to the National Park Service:

Between its construction in 1894 and its general demise as a functioning hotel around 1952, the Whitewater Hotel was an important component in the commercial life of the city of Whitewater. During this period, Whitewater's economy was almost entirely dependent upon commerce and the only area of growth was in agricultural commerce. The Whitewater Hotel had a prime location near businesses catering to agricultural commerce. The Hotel's location across the street from the Whitewater Passenger Depot gave it a ready-made clientele for people using the railroad. In 2006 the Whitewater Hotel was renovated under the federal and state tax credit program for the historic renovation of National Register-eligible buildings. Today, the building is used for apartments and a cafe.

The building was listed on the U.S. National Register of Historic Places on January 21, 2010. The listing was announced as the featured listing in the National Park Service's weekly list of January 29, 2010.
