= Meyerhofer Cobblestone House =

Historic house in Wisconsin, United States

- U.S. National Register of Historic Places
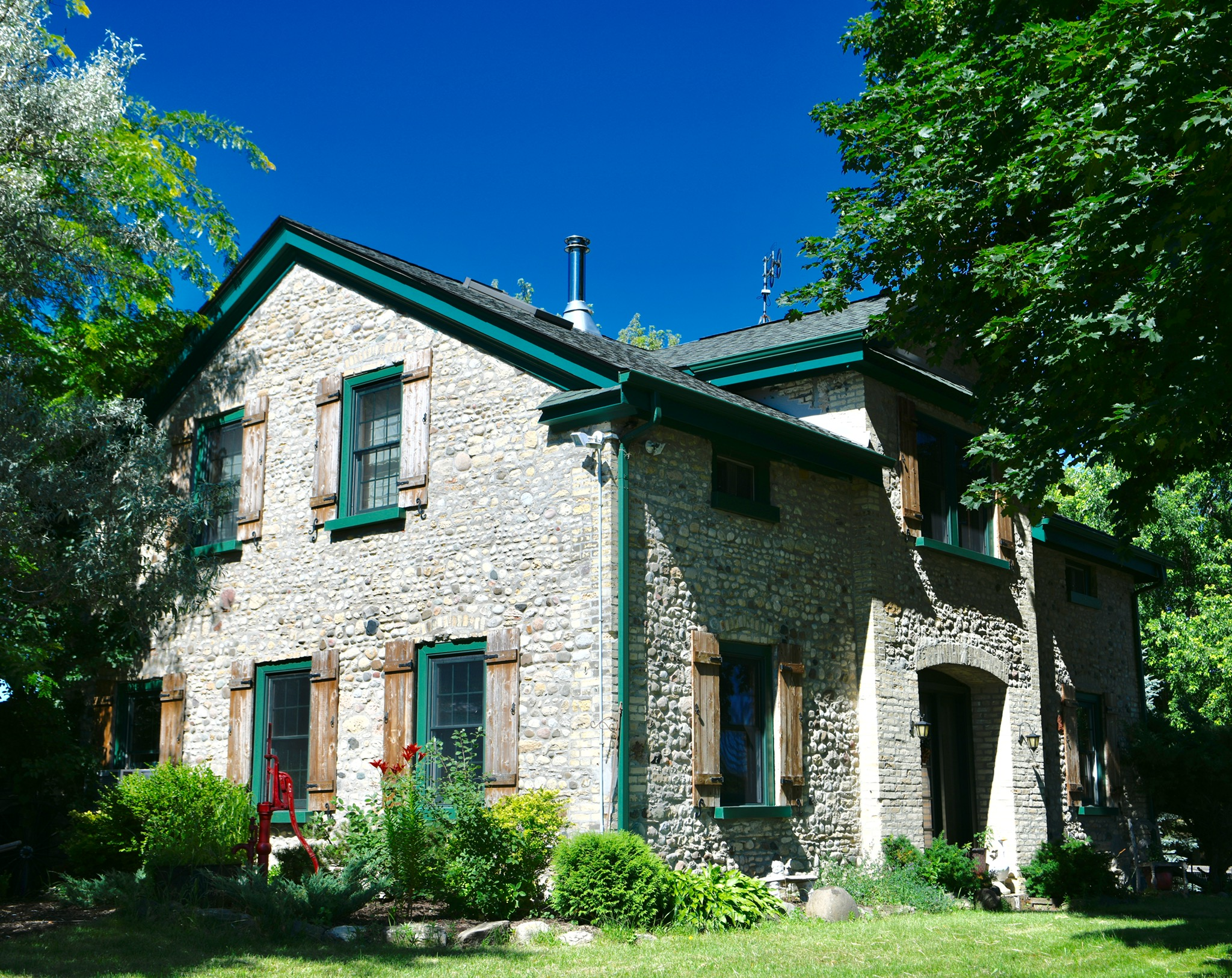
- Location: Townline Rd. Lake Geneva, Wisconsin
- Coordinates: 42°34′56″N 88°23′21″W
- Area: 0.1 acres (0.040 ha)
- Architect: Nikolaus Meyerhofer
- Architectural style: Greek Revival
- NRHP reference No.: 80000202
- Added to NRHP: December 8, 1980

The Meyerhofer Cobblestone House is a historic house located on Townline Road in the town of Lyons in Walworth County, Wisconsin, near the city of Lake Geneva. The house is built from cobblestone and is listed on the National Register of Historic Places.

== History ==
The house originally belonged to stonemason and German immigrant Nikolaus Meyerhofer. Meyerhofer built the two-story house himself in 1850 on a 160-acre (65 ha) plot he bought in 1847. He constructed the house from stones gathered by his daughters, as using whatever stones were available allowed him to finish the house faster. He also used bricks in the arched entrance and the quoins at the house's corners. The house has a Greek Revival form uncommon in Wisconsin's surviving cobblestone buildings.

The house was listed on the National Register of Historic Places in 1980 and on the State Register of Historic Places in 1989.
