= Arthur Hercz =

Hungarian-American architect (1861–1941)

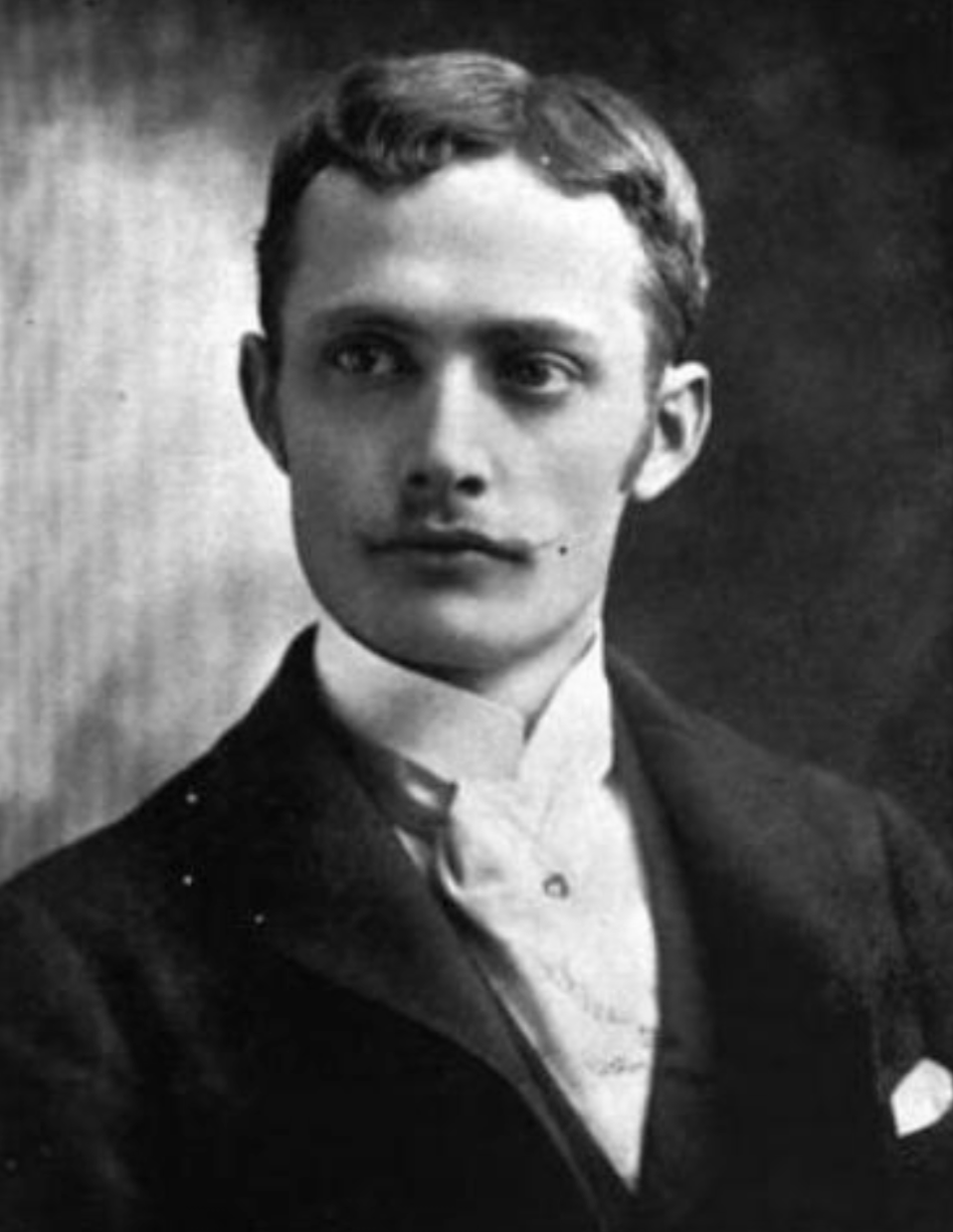
- Born: June 12, 1866; Austro-Hungarian Empire
- Died: February 3, 1941 (aged 74); Chicago, Illinois, U.S.
- Education: Academy of Fine Arts Vienna
- Occupation: Architect

Arthur Hercz (June 12, 1866 – February 3, 1941) was a Hungarian American architect and artistic director active in Chicago in the late 19th and early 20th centuries.

== Biography ==
Educated at the Academy of Fine Arts Vienna, Hercz arrived in Chicago in the early 1890s to work on the German exhibition at the World's Columbian Exposition. He remained in the city for the rest of his career. Along with his then-business partner Adolph Cudell, Hercz designed the Francis J. Dewes House in 1896, a notable Baroque style landmark in Chicago. His architectural works were primarily residences, churches, and restaurants, and he opened his studio, Arthur Hercz Studios, in 1916. In addition to his architectural work, Hercz was director of many large public pageants and festivals, often benefiting civic causes.

Hercz was married to Anna-Sophie Raster, the daughter of German American newspaper editor Hermann Raster, and was a co-director of the Illinois Publishing Company with Raster's sons. Hercz died in Chicago in 1941 at the age of 74.

The Chicago History Museum maintains a large collection of Hercz's manuscripts, posthumously donated by his family in the 1990s.
