= Thomas Elderkin =

English cricketer

Thomas Elderkin (19 July 1909 – 9 December 1961) was an English cricketer who played for Northamptonshire. He was born in Peterborough and died there too.

Elderkin made a single first-class appearance, during the 1934 season, against Sussex at Peterborough. From the middle-order, he scored 13 runs in the first innings and was bowled without scoring in the second innings. Northamptonshire lost the match by an innings and 61 runs.
