= Delavan Post Office =

- U.S. National Register of Historic Places
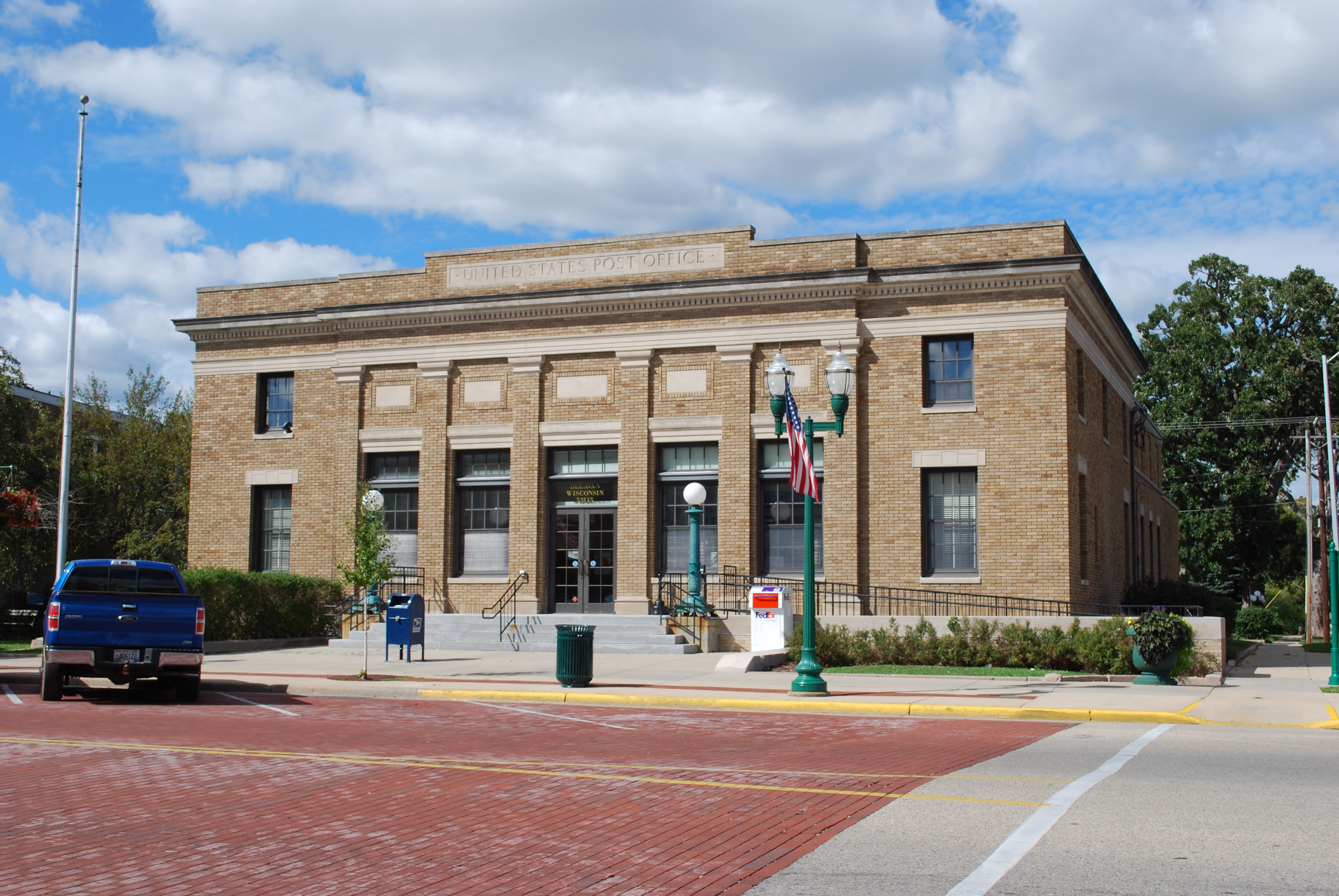
- Delavan Post Office

- Location within Wisconsin Location within the United States
- Interactive map showing the location of the Delavan Post Office
- Location: 335 E. Walworth Ave. Delavan, Wisconsin
- Coordinates: 42.63335°N 88.64413°W
- Area: less than one acre
- Built: 1914
- Architect: Oscar Wenderoth
- Architectural style: Classical Revival
- MPS: United States Post Office Construction in Wisconsin MPS
- NRHP reference No.: 00001260
- Added to NRHP: October 24, 2000

The Delavan Post Office is located in Delavan, Wisconsin. It was added to the National Register of Historic Places in 2000.

It is located on Delavan's Vitrified Brick Street.

It is a two-story building which has six brick pilasters with Tuscan capitals dividing its front facade into five bays, overlooking wide granite steps. It has a carved, stone architrave wrapping around the building, beneath a brick frieze and denticulated cornice.

Its interior includes a mural painted in 1984 by Rosemary Roth showing scenes from Delavan's history.
