= Delavan's Vitrified Brick Street =

- U.S. National Register of Historic Places
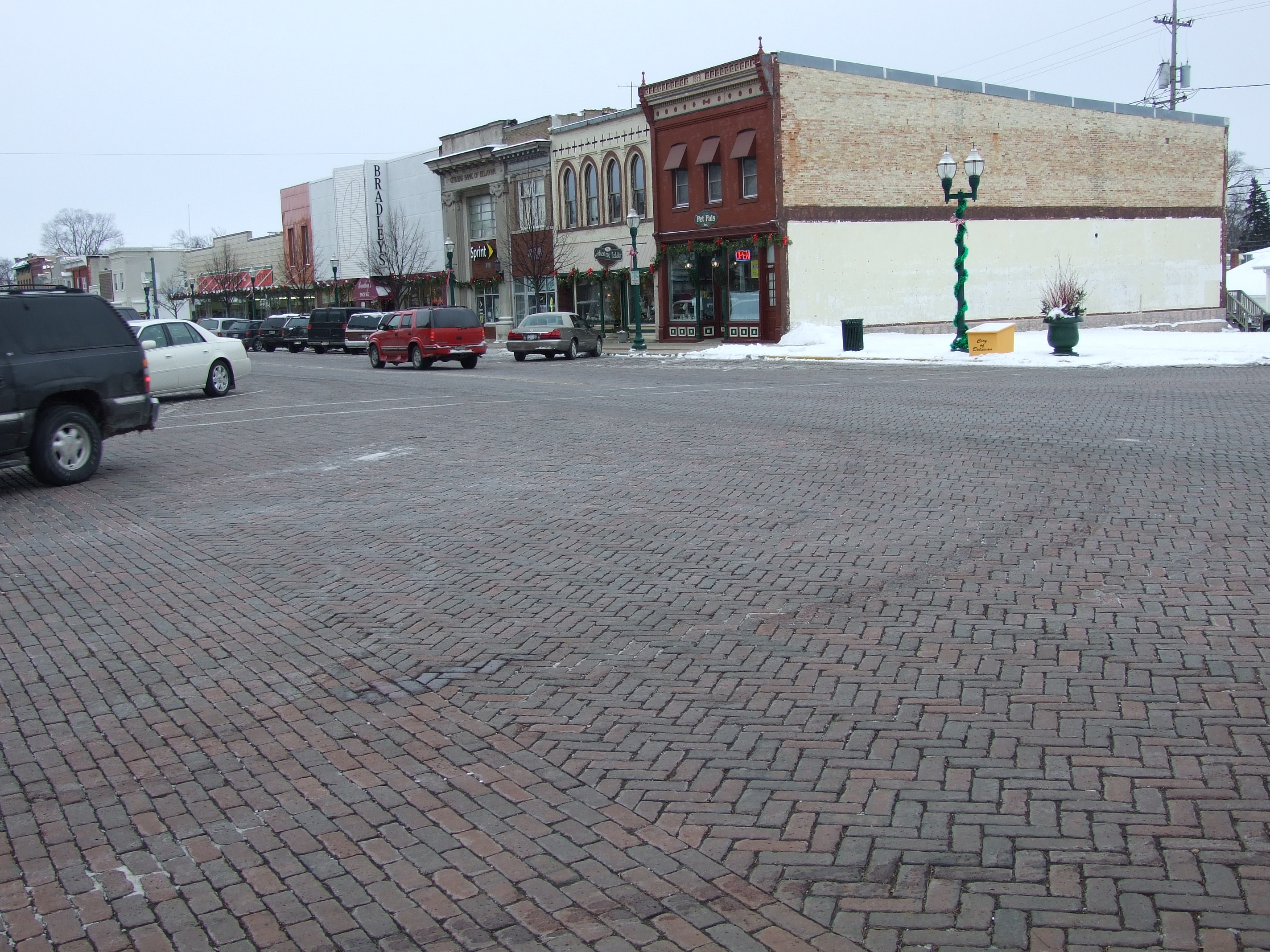
- Delavan's Vitrified Brick Street
- Location: Walworth Ave. Delavan, Wisconsin
- Coordinates: 42.6330135°N 88.6461228°W
- Built: 1913
- NRHP reference No.: 96000234
- Added to NRHP: March 7, 1996

A Vitrified Brick Street stretches across three blocks of Walworth Avenue and State Highway 11 in Delavan, Wisconsin. The entire street was built in 1913 at a cost of US$19,198.18 (equivalent to $640,491 in 2025). Vitrified brick, formed from dense, and heavily fired clay, was used because it was water resistant and durable. The street would continue to be in use until 1996 when the roadbed was replaced. One third of the original bricks survived and continue to exist in the street today. It was added to the National Register of Historic Places in 1996.

On the west end of the brick is Tower Park, where the historical marker is located. At the east end sits the Delavan Post Office. Various local business are located in between.
