= Israel Stowell Temperance House =

- U.S. National Register of Historic Places
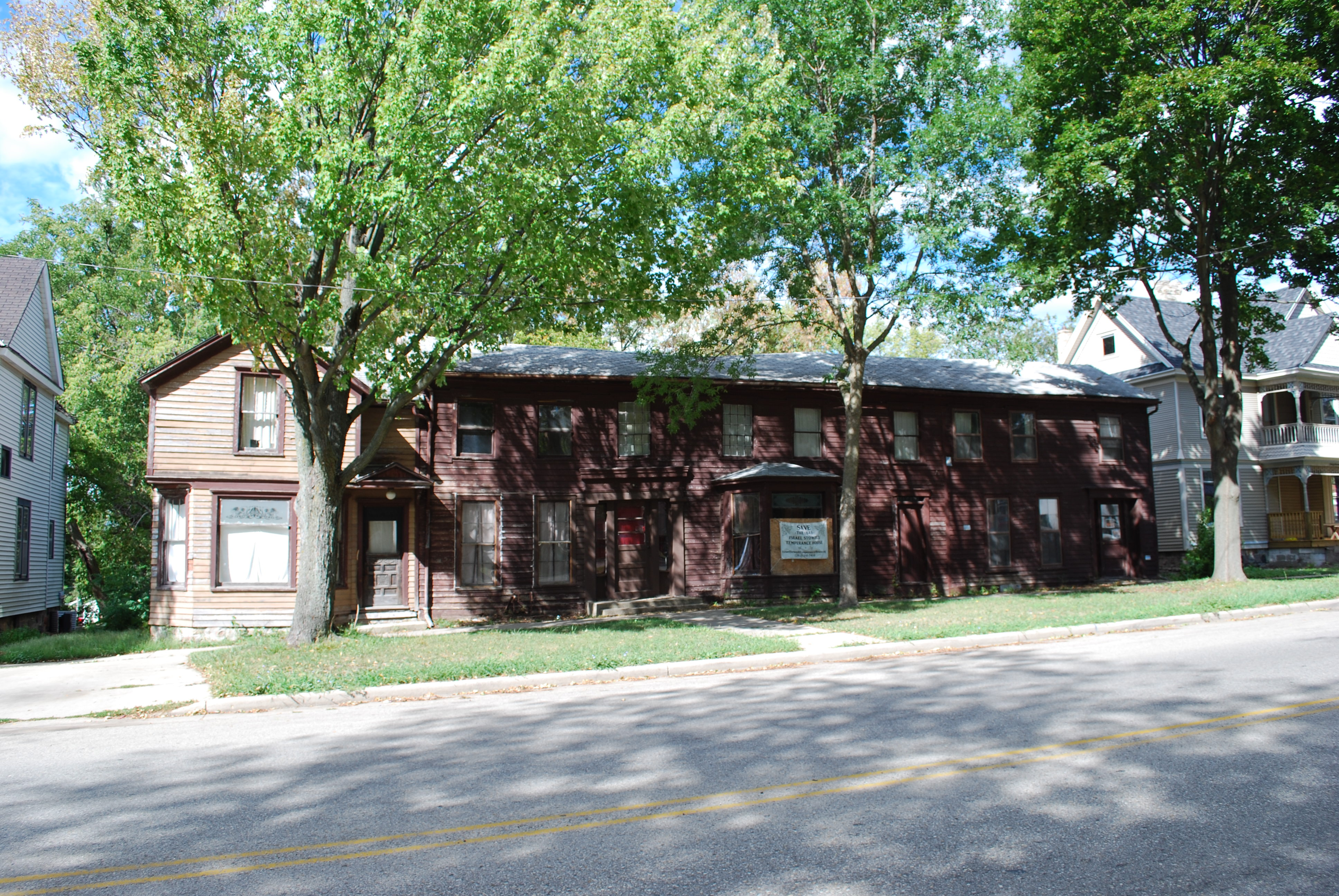
- Israel Stowell Temperance House, 2012, prior to demolition in 2021
- Location: 61-65 E. Walworth Ave. Delavan, Wisconsin
- Coordinates: 42.63322°N 88.64898°W
- Area: 0.28 acres (0.11 ha)
- Built: 1840
- Built by: Israel Stowell
- Architect: Israel Stowell
- Architectural style: Greek Revival, Victorian
- Demolished: 2021
- NRHP reference No.: 78000145
- Added to NRHP: August 11, 1978

The Israel Stowell Temperance House was built as an alcohol-free tavern starting in 1840 in the temperance colony of Delavan, Wisconsin. It was added to the National Register of Historic Places in 1978.

Delavan was founded in 1836 as a temperance colony by Samuel and Henry Phoenix, reformers who came out of the revivals of the 1820s in the burned-over district of western New York. The brothers were reform-minded Baptists, against slavery and against alcohol, and in the wilds of Wisconsin they planned to start a new community free of these evils. North of Delavan Lake they found their site and on trees there Samuel painted the words "Temperance Colony." They recruited like-minded colonists from back east, and wrote prohibitions against alcohol into the deeds to the land that they sold. In 1839 they started a Baptist church in Delavan true to their values.

In 1840 the Phoenixes heard about six "temperance houses" - taverns which operated without alcohol - around southeast Wisconsin. They decided that the community of Delvan should have one. They arranged with Israel Stowell to build and operate such a house. Stowell was another immigrant from New York - 27 years old. The Phoenixes provided lumber from their sawmill and some materials. In return, Stowell would operate the inn free of alcohol.

Stowell built the original, central part of the building in the spring of 1840 - a side-gabled saltbox shape; i.e. with two stories exposed in front and one in back. The front door is in Greek Revival style, framed by a heavy molded lintel supported by pilasters. Windows were multi-pane, twelve over eight, and the originals survive in the upstairs of the central section. The framework is hewed oak and walnut beams, connected with mortise and tenon. Inside downstairs is a central staircase with two rooms on either side. The oldest walls are plaster over oak split-lath. Soon after the original construction, Stowell extended the building east three bays, continuing the same design and post and beam construction techniques. Later it was extended another ten feet east, but that section is balloon-framed.

True to the agreement, Stowell had the house ready for business in June. It was a community meeting place, with the first town meeting held there in 1842. It was also a haven for outsiders passing on the road west from Racine.

But the temperance colony did not survive. The Phoenix brothers died in the early 1840s. When Stowell left the tavern in the mid 1840s, it was taken over by other innkeepers. In the late 1840s a Mr. Harkness began serving alcohol there. Newer hotels were built in Delavan, and began taking business from the old temperance house.

In 1854 Eliphas Gates bought the building, expanded it, and converted it into three homes for his three children. The bay window was added to the center section later in the 19th century. Around the turn of the century the Victorian addition was added to the west end. Gates descendants lived there for 120 years.

The building has been featured in USA Today.
