= Whitewater station =

Historic railway station

Whitewater
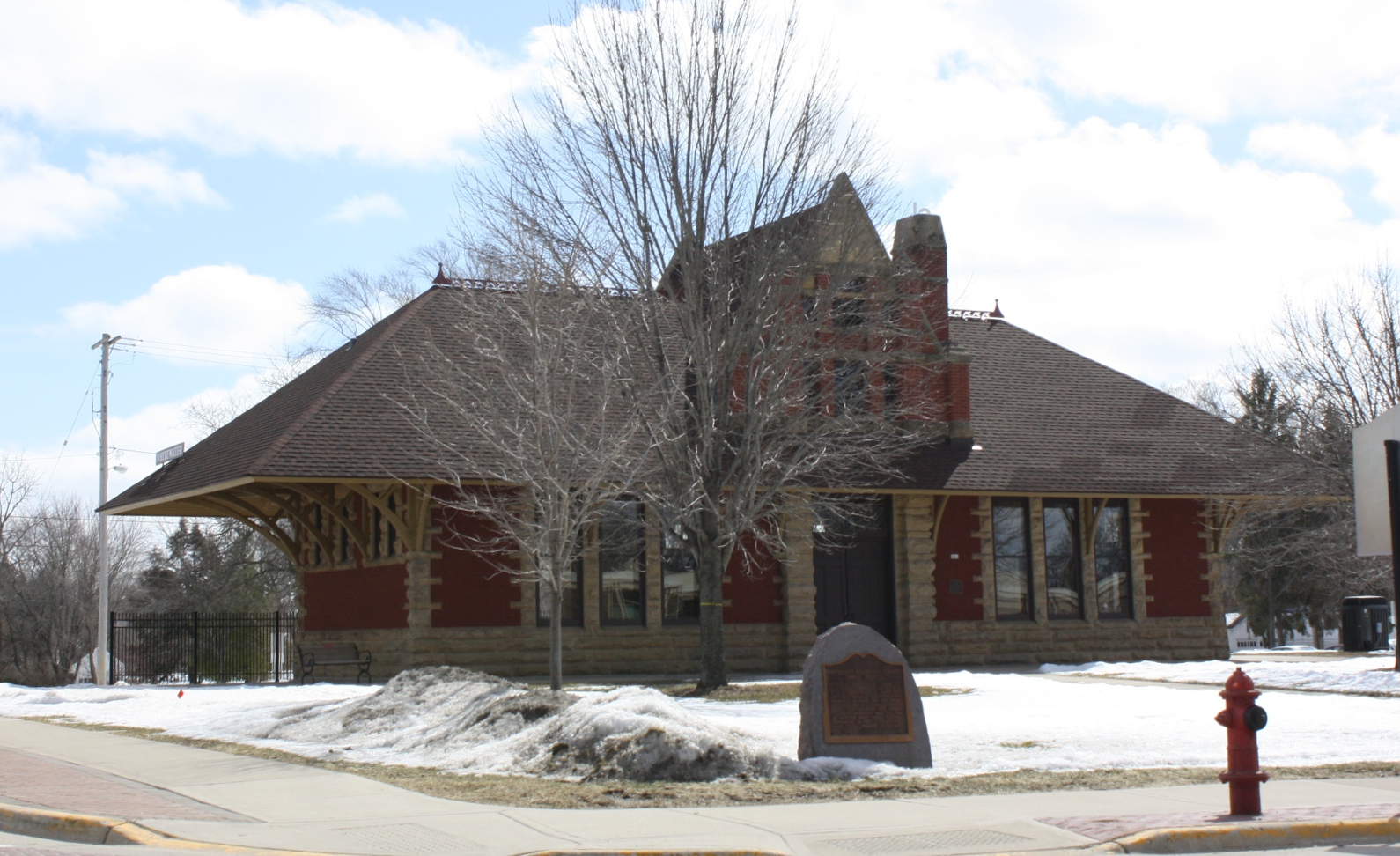
- The depot in 2013

General information
- Location: 301 W. Whitewater Street, Whitewater, Wisconsin 53190
- System: Former Milwaukee Road passenger rail station

History
- Opened: 1891
- Closed: November 29, 1951

Services
Preceding station	Milwaukee Road	Following station
Lima Center toward Madison	Madison – Milwaukee via Waukesha	Palmyra toward Milwaukee
- Whitewater Passenger Depot
- U.S. National Register of Historic Places
- Location within Wisconsin Location within the United States
- Coordinates: 42°49′54″N 88°43′58″W
- Area: less than one acre
- Built: 1891
- Architect: J. T. W. Jennings
- Architectural style: Richardsonian Romanesque, High Victorian Gothic
- NRHP reference No.: 13000376
- Added to NRHP: June 12, 2013
Location

The Whitewater Passenger Depot is a historic railway station located at 301 W. Whitewater Street in Whitewater, Wisconsin. The station was built in 1891 to serve the Chicago, Milwaukee, St. Paul and Pacific Railroad, also known as the Milwaukee Road. Railroad architect J. T. W. Jennings designed the station with influences from Richardsonian Romanesque and High Victorian Gothic styles. Passenger train service to the station ended on November 29, 1951.

The station was added to the National Register of Historic Places on June 12, 2013.
