= Adolph Cudell =

American architect

Adolph Cudell (1850 – August 18, 1910) was an architect practicing in Chicago, Illinois, in the late Nineteenth Century. Born in Germany, he settled in Chicago in 1873. Among other houses, he designed Black Point in Linn, Wisconsin, and the Francis J. Dewes House in Chicago. In the 1890s he was partners with Arthur Hercz, with whom he designed the Dewes mansion.
