= Edward Elderkin House =

Historic house in Wisconsin, United States

- U.S. National Register of Historic Places
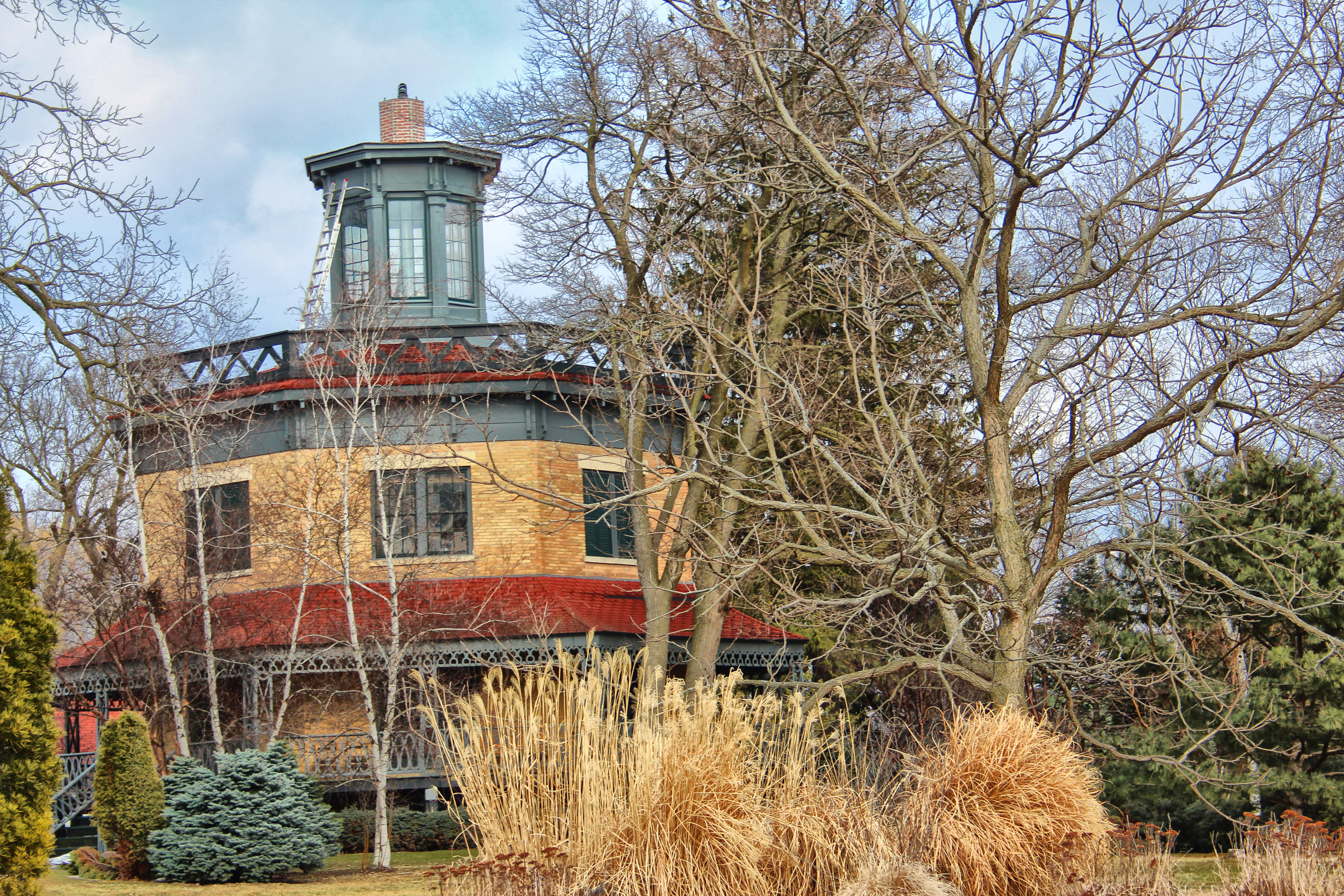

- Location within Wisconsin Location within the United States
- Location: 127 S. Lincoln St., Elkhorn, Wisconsin
- Coordinates: 42°40′5″N 88°33′9″W
- Built: 1856
- Architect: Elderkin, Edward
- Architectural style: Octagon Mode
- NRHP reference No.: 74000132
- Added to NRHP: May 03, 1974

The Edward Elderkin House, also known as the Round House, is a historic octagon house built in 1856 by Edward Elderkin. It is located at 127 South Lincoln Street in Elkhorn, Wisconsin, United States. On May 3, 1974, it was added to the National Register of Historic Places. The two-story home was constructed of buff brick and features a wrap-around porch, a tall, windowed cupola and a central chimney.
