= University of Wisconsin–Whitewater =

Public university in Whitewater, Wisconsin, U.S.

- Former names: Whitewater Normal School (1868–1927); Whitewater Teachers College (1927–1951); Wisconsin State College–Whitewater (1951–1964); Wisconsin State University–Whitewater (1964–1971)
- Type: Public university
- Established: April 21, 1868; 158 years ago
- Parent institution: University of Wisconsin System
- Accreditation: HLC
- Chancellor: Corey A. King
- Provost: John Chenoweth
- Students: 11,631 (fall 2024)
- Undergraduates: 9,997 (fall 2024)
- Postgraduates: 1,634 (fall 2024)
- Location: Whitewater, Wisconsin, United States; 42.838339°N 88.743246°W
- Campus: 400 acres (1.6 km^{2}); Distant town
- Other campuses: Janesville
- Newspaper: Royal Purple
- Colors: Purple and white
- Nickname: Warhawks
- Sporting affiliations: NCAA Division III – WIAC
- Mascot: Willie Warhawk
- Website: uww.edu

The University of Wisconsin–Whitewater (UW–Whitewater or UWW) is a public university in Whitewater, Wisconsin, United States. It is part of the University of Wisconsin System. As of fall 2024, the university offers 47 undergraduate majors and 13 graduate programs and enrolls approximately 11,000 students. Approximately 1,400 faculty and staff are employed by the university, and the student body consists of individuals from about 40 US states and 30 countries. UW–Whitewater operates the University of Wisconsin–Whitewater at Rock County, a two-year branch campus in Janesville, Wisconsin.

== History ==
On April 21, 1868, the school was named "Whitewater Normal School" and graduated its first class of teachers in June 1870.

A unique tradition of the school was "Students' Day". One day during the term, faculty would, unannounced, be entirely absent. Once students recognized that the day must be Students' Day, they would elect a president and faculty from amongst themselves who would take up the regular duties of the day. The annual catalogue stated the purpose of Students' Day: "The object of thus putting the institution under the care of the students is to test their moral culture, their executive ability, and their devotion to their work."

In 1927, the school received authority to grant baccalaureate degrees in education and its name was changed to "Whitewater Teachers College". With the addition of the liberal arts programs in 1951 it became "Wisconsin State College–Whitewater", and was later designated a Wisconsin State University in 1964, the "Wisconsin State University–Whitewater".

In 1971, after the merger of the former University of Wisconsin and the former Wisconsin State Universities, the school became part of the University of Wisconsin System and has been called the "University of Wisconsin–Whitewater" since.

== Campus ==
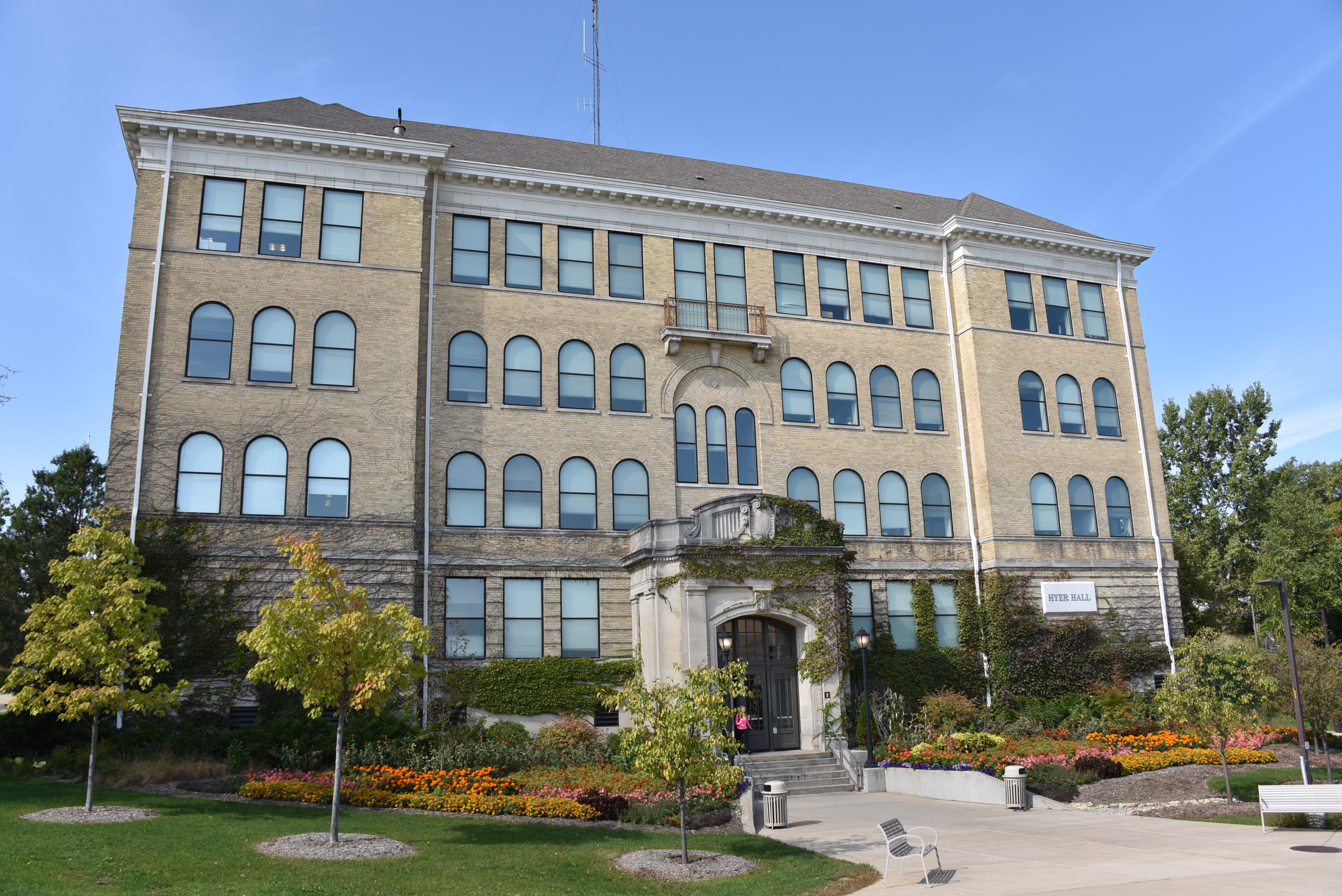
Hyer Hall (Old Main)

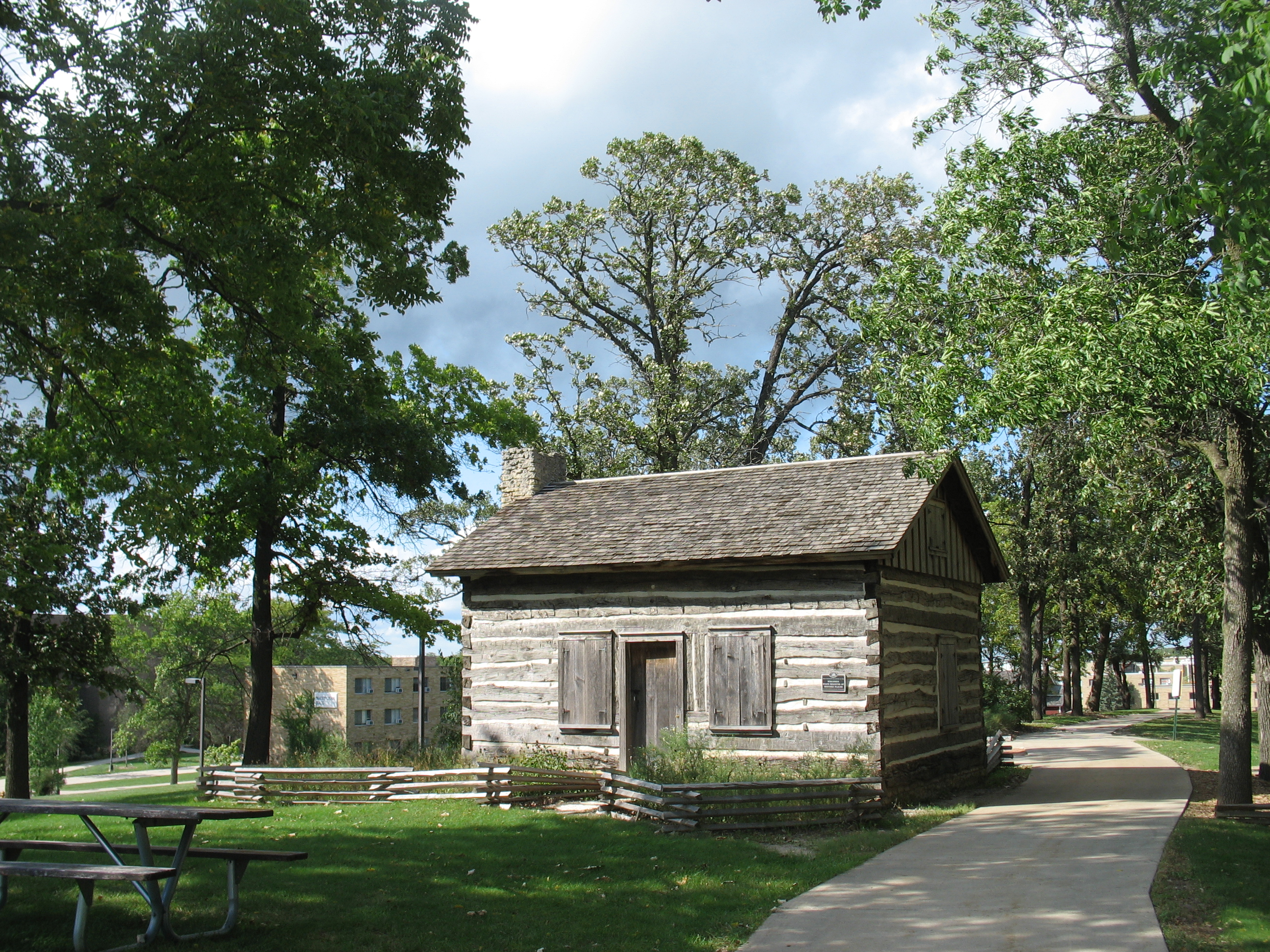
The Halverson Log Cabin, built in 1846, on the UWW campus

The University of Wisconsin–Whitewater encompasses 400 acres (160 ha) in southeastern Wisconsin. The landmark of the university's campus, Old Main, was destroyed by fire on February 7, 1970. The school's oldest building, it was the only one that had been part of the original campus. The east wing of Old Main, now called Hyer Hall, is all that remains of the building. It houses many of the university's administrative offices, in addition to classrooms and lecture halls. After the fire that destroyed Old Main, the building's carillon bell was removed and installed in front of the Alumni Center. Now, an electronic carillon bell rings regularly throughout the day.

The James R. Connor University Center occupies the heart of campus. The "UC" contains a bowling alley, an art gallery, a stage for live music, a coffee shop, and several dining options. Young Auditorium, the largest performing arts venue on campus, hosts dance, music, theatre, comedy, and other university events. The UW–Whitewater Nature Preserve is located in the northeast corner of campus and consists of 110 acres of various ecosystems such as woodlands, wetlands, and prairie. In addition to serving as an outdoor classroom and laboratory, the preserve includes recreational trails for running, hiking, cross-country skiing, or biking.

== Student life ==
The University of Wisconsin–Whitewater has over 180 recognized student clubs and organizations.

=== Student Government ===
Whitewater Student Government (WSG) is the students' governing body. WSG is split into two branches of government, the Executive Branch headed by the President and the Legislative Branch, also known as the Senate, headed by the Speaker of the Senate. The WSG Senate will recommend the annual Allocable Segregated Fee every fall semester to be presented to the Chancellor of the institution, pending final approval from the Board of Regents of the University of Wisconsin System. The power to determine a recommended allocation to WSG is vested in the Segregated University Fee Allocation Committee(SUFAC).

=== Greek life ===
As of Fall 2024, there are 24 Greek organizations recognized by the university. They fall under 4 different Greek Councils, the Interfraternity Council(IFC), the Intercultural Greek Council(IGC), National PanHellenic Council(NPHC) and the PanHellenic Council(PHC).

=== Media ===
The Royal Purple is the university's independent student newspaper; its first issue was printed in 1901.

UWW-TV is the university's student-run television channel. It is located on channel 100.1 in high definition. It is also available around the city of Whitewater on Spectrum cable channel 989.

91.7 The Edge is the campus's student-run radio station, broadcasting out of Andersen Library since 1966.

== Academics ==
The University of Wisconsin–Whitewater is split into four undergraduate colleges at the Whitewater Campus and one at the Rock County Campus and a graduate school. These include the:

- College of Arts and Communication
- College of Business and Economics
- College of Education and Professional Studies
- College of Integrated Studies
- College of Letters and Sciences
- School of Graduate Studies

== Athletics ==
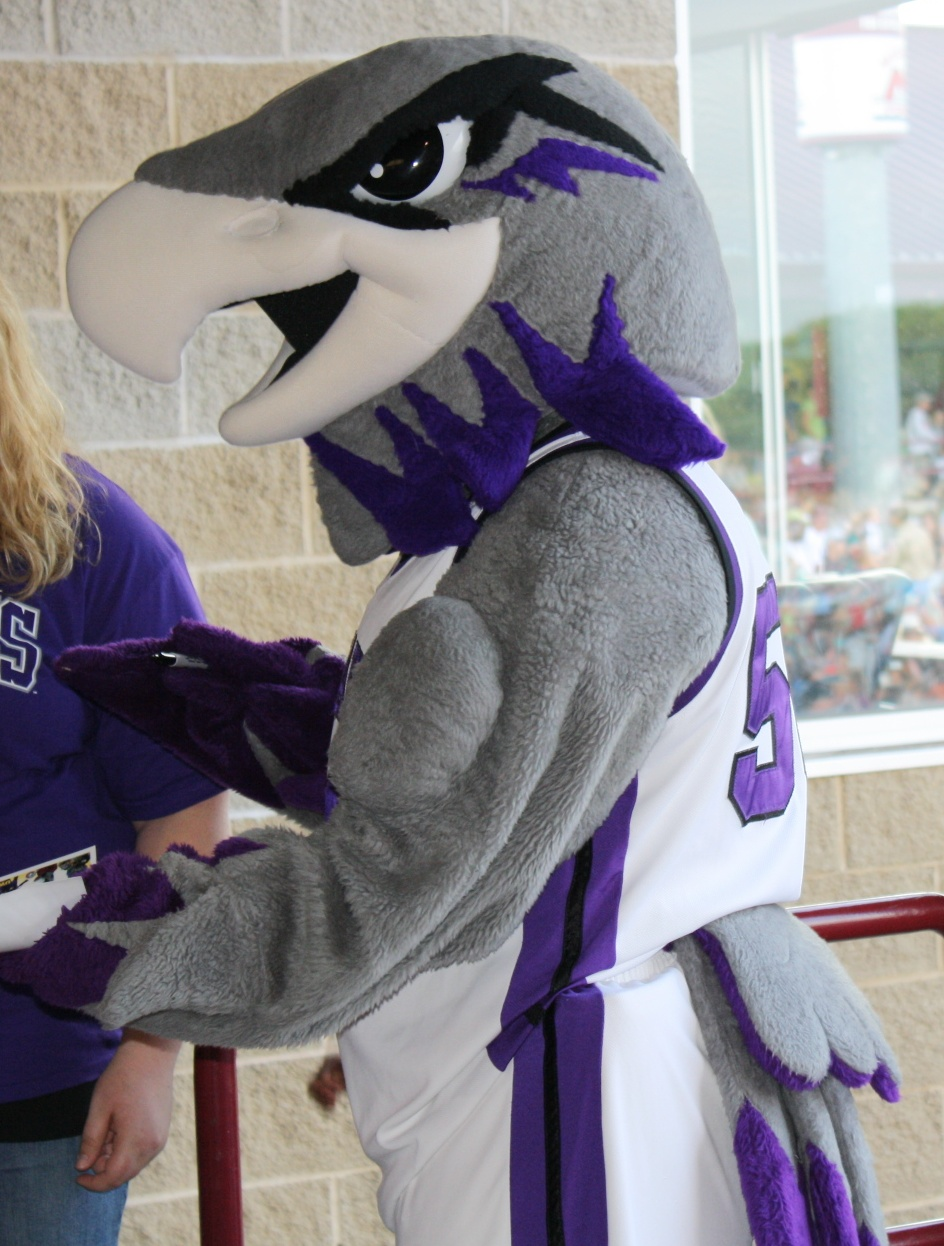
Willie Warhawk, UWW mascot

UW–Whitewater is a member of NCAA Division III for athletics. It is a part of the Wisconsin Intercollegiate Athletic Conference (WIAC). The university's athletics teams are nicknamed the Warhawks and are represented by the colors purple and white.

In the 2013–14 academic year, the Warhawks won the men's football, basketball, and baseball championships. UW–Whitewater is the first school in NCAA history in any division to attain such a three-sport sweep in the same academic year.

One of UW–Whitewater's programs for students with disabilities, Cornerstones for Success, provides athletes with disabilities the opportunity to share their experiences in sports and everyday life. UW–Whitewater also has wheelchair basketball programs for men and women; both teams have won national championships.

== Notable people ==
=== Alumni ===
- Alex Kister, American Youtuber and filmmaker

=== Faculty ===
- Thomas Chrowder Chamberlin, geologist
- Brian Coppola, chemist
- Warren S. Johnson, professor of natural science
- Quinn Meinerz, professional football player
- Andrea Nye, religious studies scholar
- Alison Townsend, poet
