= List of places in California (D) =

List of places in California - D

This list of current:

- cities
- towns, unincorporated communities
- counties, and other recognized places in the U.S. state of California.

Information on the number and names of counties in which the place lies, and its lower and upper ZIP Code bounds, if applicable are also included.

Name of place	Number of counties	Principal county	Lower zip code	Upper zip code
Daggett	1	San Bernardino County	92327	
Dairy City	1	Orange County		
Dairyland	1	Madera County		
Dairyland	1	Orange County		
Dairy Valley	1	Los Angeles County	90703	
Dairyville	1	Tehama County	96080	
Dales	1	Tehama County	96080	
Daley Mill	1	Kern County		
Daly City	1	San Mateo County	94014	17
Dana	1	Shasta County	96036	
Dana Point	1	Orange County	92629	
Danby	1	San Bernardino County	92332	
Danielson	1	Solano County		
Dantoni Junction	1	Yuba County		
Danville	1	Contra Costa County	94526	
Daphnedale Park	1	Modoc County		
Dardanelle	1	Tuolumne County	95314	
Darlington	1	El Dorado County		
Darlingtonia	1	Del Norte County		
Darrah	1	Mariposa County	95338	
Darwin	1	Inyo County	93522	
Date City	1	Imperial County	92250	
Date Palm Beach	1	Riverside County		
Daulton	1	Madera County	93637	
Davenport	1	Santa Cruz County	95017	
Davis	1	Yolo County	95616	
Davis Creek	1	Modoc County	96108	
Day	1	Modoc County	96056	
Dayton	1	Butte County	95926	
Dayton Avenue	1	Los Angeles County		
Day Valley	1	Santa Cruz County		
Daywalt	1	Sonoma County	95472	
Deadwood	1	Trinity County		
Deadwood	1	Tuolumne County		
Deane Brothers Subdivision	1	Los Angeles County	91350	
Dearborn Park	1	San Mateo County	94060	
Death Valley	1	Inyo County	92328	
Death Valley Junction	1	Inyo County	92328	
Death Valley National Monument	2	Inyo County	92328	
Death Valley National Monument	2	San Bernardino County	92328	
Debon	1	Siskiyou County	96094	
Declezville	1	San Bernardino County		
Decoto	1	Alameda County	94587	
Dedrick	1	Trinity County		
Deep Springs	1	Inyo County	89010	
Deer Creek	1	Tehama County	96063	
Deer Creek Colony	1	Tulare County		
Deer Crossing	1	Fresno County		
Deer Lake Highlands	1	Los Angeles County		
Deer Lick Springs	1	Trinity County	96001	
Deer Lodge	1	Mendocino County		
Deer Park	1	Napa County	94576	
Deer View	1	El Dorado County		
Deetz	1	Siskiyou County		
Defense Depot, Tracy	1	San Joaquin County	95376	
DeHaven	1	Mendocino County		
Del Aire	1	Los Angeles County	90250	
Del Amo	1	Los Angeles County	90503	
Delano	1	Kern County	93215	
Delavan	1	Colusa County		
Del Dios	1	San Diego County	92025	
Delevan	1	Colusa County	95988	
Delft Colony	1	Tulare County	93618	
Delhi	1	Merced County	95315	
Delkern	1	Kern County	93382	
Delleker	1	Plumas County	96122	
Del Loma	1	Trinity County	96010	
Del Mar	1	San Diego County	92014	
Del Mar	1	Santa Cruz County	95062	
Del Mar Heights	1	San Diego County		
Del Mesa	1	Marin County	94904	
Del Monte	1	Monterey County		
Del Monte Forest	1	Monterey County	93953	
Del Monte Heights	1	Monterey County	93955	
Del Monte Park	1	Monterey County	93950	
Del Paso	1	Sacramento County		
Del Paso Heights	1	Sacramento County	95838	
Del Rey	1	Fresno County	93616	
Del Rey Oaks	1	Monterey County	93940	
Del Rio	1	Stanislaus County		
Del Rio Sacramento	1	Sacramento County		
Del Rio Woods	1	Sonoma County	95448	
Del Rosa	1	San Bernardino County	92404	
Del Sur	1	Los Angeles County	93536	
Delta	1	Los Angeles County		
Delta	1	San Joaquin County	95202	
Delta	1	Shasta County		
De Luz	1	San Diego County	92055	
De Luz	1	San Diego County	92028	
Del Valle	1	Los Angeles County	90015	
Democrat Hot Springs	1	Kern County	93301	
Denair	1	Stanislaus County	95316	
Denis	1	Los Angeles County		
Dennis Park	1	Los Angeles County		
Denny	1	Trinity County	95535	
Denverton	1	Solano County	94585	
Derby Acres	1	Kern County	93224	
DeSabla	1	Butte County		
Descanso	1	San Diego County	91916	
Descanso Junction	1	San Diego County		
Desert	1	Los Angeles County		
Desert	1	San Bernardino County	92366	
Desert Beach	1	Riverside County	92254	
Desert Camp	1	Riverside County		
Desert Center	1	Riverside County	92239	
Desert Heights	1	San Bernardino County		
Desert Hot Springs	1	Riverside County	92240	
Desert Lake	1	Kern County	93516	
Desert Lodge	1	San Diego County		
Desert Shores	1	Imperial County	92274	
Desert Springs	1	San Bernardino County		
Desert View	1	Riverside County		
Desert View Highlands	1	Los Angeles County	93550	
Des Moines	1	Orange County	90631	
Desmont	1	San Bernardino County		
Devils Den	1	Kern County	93204	
Devils Postpile National Monument	1	Madera County	93271	
Devon	1	Santa Barbara County		
Devore	1	San Bernardino County	92407	
Devore Heights	1	San Bernardino County	92407	
Dew Drop	1	Nevada County		
Diablo	1	Contra Costa County	94528	
Diamond	1	Orange County	92704	
Diamond Bar	1	Los Angeles County	91765	
Diamond Heights	1	San Francisco County	94131	
Diamond Springs	1	El Dorado County	95619	
Diamond Springs Heights	1	El Dorado County	95619	
Di Giorgio	1	Kern County	93217	
Dillard	1	Sacramento County		
Dillon Beach	1	Marin County	94929	
Dimond	1	Alameda County	94602	
Dinkey Creek	1	Fresno County	93664	
Dinsmore	1	Humboldt County	95526	
Dinuba	1	Tulare County	93618	
Dirigo	1	Shasta County		
Discovery Bay	1	Contra Costa County	94514	
Ditch Camp Five	1	El Dorado County		
Division	1	San Diego County		
Dixieland	1	Imperial County		
Dixon	1	Solano County	95620	
Dixon Lane-Meadow Creek	1	Inyo County		
Dobbins	1	Yuba County	95935	
Doble	1	San Bernardino County		
Dockweiler	1	Los Angeles County	90007	
Doghouse Junction	1	San Diego County		
Dogtown	1	Mariposa County		
Dogtown	1	San Joaquin County		
Doheny	1	Los Angeles County		
Doheny Park	1	Orange County	92672	
Dolanco Junction	1	Los Angeles County		
Dollar Point	1	Placer County		
Dollar Ranch	1	Contra Costa County	94595	
Dolomite	1	Inyo County	93545	
Dolores	1	Los Angeles County		
Dominguez	1	Los Angeles County	90810	
Dominguez Hills	1	Los Angeles County	90747	
Dominguez Junction	1	Los Angeles County		
Donlon	1	Ventura County	93030	
Donner	1	Nevada County	95737	
Donner Lake	1	Nevada County	96161	
Don Pedro Camp	1	Tuolumne County	95329	
Doon	1	Butte County		
Dora Belle	1	Fresno County		
Dorrington	1	Calaveras County	95223	
Dorris	1	Siskiyou County	96023	
Dos Cabezas	1	San Diego County		
Dos Palmas Corners	1	Riverside County		
Dos Palos	1	Merced County	93620	
Dos Palos	1	Merced County		
Dos Palos Y	1	Merced County		
Dos Rios	1	Mendocino County	95429	
Dougherty	1	Alameda County		
Dougherty	1	San Joaquin County		
Douglas	1	Los Angeles County	90405	
Douglas City	1	Trinity County	96024	
Douglas Flat	1	Calaveras County	95229	
Douglas Junction	1	Los Angeles County		
Douglas Park	1	Del Norte County		
Dove Canyon	1	Orange County		
Downey	1	Los Angeles County	90240	42
Downey Road	1	Los Angeles County		
Downieville	1	Sierra County	95936	
Downtown	1	Kern County	93303	
Downtown	1	Los Angeles County	91502	
Downtown	1	Los Angeles County	90266	
Downtown	1	Riverside County	92501	
Downtown	1	San Bernardino County	91762	
Downtown	1	San Bernardino County	92402	
Downtown	1	San Diego County	92101	
Downtown	1	San Mateo County	94064	
Downtown	1	Tuolumne County	95370	
Doyle	1	Lassen County	96109	
Doyle	1	Tulare County	93257	
Doyle Center	1	San Diego County		
Doyle Colony	1	Tulare County		
Dozier	1	Solano County		
Drake	1	Santa Barbara County		
Drakesbad	1	Plumas County	96020	
Drawbridge	1	Alameda County		
Dresser	1	Alameda County		
Dry Creek	1	Siskiyou County		
Dry Creek Rancheria	1	Sonoma County	95441	
Dryden Research Center	1	Kern County	93523	
Drytown	1	Amador County	95699	
Duarte	1	Los Angeles County	91010	
Dubbers	1	San Diego County		
Dublin	1	Alameda County	94568	
Ducor	1	Tulare County	93218	
Dudley	1	Yolo County		
Dudmore	1	Los Angeles County		
Dufour	1	Yolo County		
Dulah	1	Ventura County		
Dulzura	1	San Diego County	91917	
Dumbarton	1	Alameda County		
Dumont	1	San Bernardino County		
Duncans Mills	1	Sonoma County	95430	
Duncan Springs	1	Mendocino County		
Dunderberg Mill	1	Mono County		
Dunlap	1	Fresno County	93621	
Dunlap Acres	1	San Bernardino County	92399	
Dunmovin	1	Inyo County	93542	
Dunn	1	San Bernardino County		
Dunneville	1	San Benito County		
Dunneville Corners	1	San Benito County	95023	
Dunnigan	1	Yolo County	95937	
Dunsmuir	1	Siskiyou County	96025	
Du Pont	1	Contra Costa County		
Durham	1	Butte County	95938	
Durmid	1	Riverside County		
Dustin Acres	1	Kern County	93268	
Dutch Flat	1	Placer County	95714	
Dutton	1	Solano County		
Dyer	1	Orange County		
