= Delavan =

Delavan may refer to a community in the United States:

- Delevan, California, formerly Delavan
- Delavan, Illinois
- Delavan, Kansas
- Delavan, Minnesota
- Delavan, Wisconsin, a city
- Delavan (town), Wisconsin, a town
  - East Delavan, Wisconsin, an unincorporated community
- Delavan Lake, Wisconsin, a census-designated place
- Delavan Township, Illinois
- Delavan Township, Faribault County, Minnesota

== See also ==
- Delevan (disambiguation)
