= Harry Prosen =

North American psychiatrist (1930–2021)

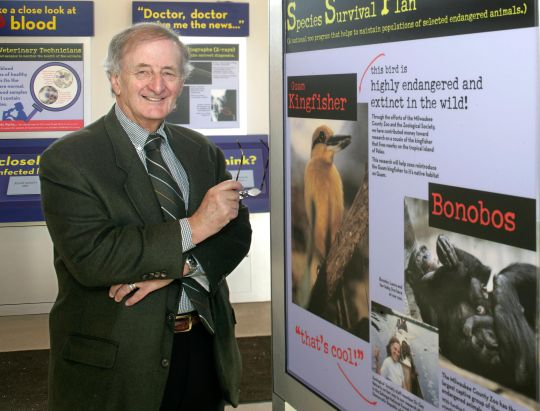
- Prosen receiving an award from the Bonobo Species Preservation Society of the Milwaukee County Zoo
- Born: Harry Prosen; June 27, 1930; Saskatoon, Saskatchewan, Canada
- Died: June 21, 2021 (aged 90); Mequon, Wisconsin
- Education: University of Manitoba; University of Chicago
- Spouse: Yvonne Prosen
- Children: 4
- Awards: See Selected awards and positions
- Scientific career
- Fields: Psychiatry
- Workplaces: University of Manitoba; Medical College of Wisconsin
- Website: www.harryprosen.com

Harry Prosen (27 June 1930 – 21 June 2021) was a North American psychiatrist. He was Emeritus Professor of Psychiatry and Behavioural Medicine, Medical College of Wisconsin, USA; Professor of Psychiatry, University of Manitoba, Canada; and past president of the Canadian Psychiatric Association. He held leadership roles with the Royal College of Physicians and Surgeons of Canada and the American Psychiatric Association.

== Early life and education ==
Canadian by birth, Prosen obtained his initial qualifications from the University of Manitoba in the 1950s, before spending part of his residency at the University of Chicago studying under notable researchers including Heinz Kohut.

== Career ==
For more than 50 years, Prosen was involved in clinical and teaching psychiatry. He was Head of the Department of Psychiatry at the University of Manitoba from 1975 to 1987; and Chairman of the Department of Psychiatry and Behavioural Medicine at the Medical College of Wisconsin from 1987 to 2003. He has been on numerous clinical, academic, institutional, government and editorial boards in both Canada and the United States; and been consultant to many hospitals, universities and associations. From 1978 to 1979, he was the President of the Canadian Psychiatric Association.

== Empathy and bonobos ==
His earlier work focused on inter-generational issues in families, focusing particularly on empathy and empathic deficits. Much of this work originated in studying variations of the life-stages of humans, then developing an inter-generational approach to psychiatric treatment. His 1972 paper The Remembered Mother and the Fantasized Mother has been regarded as an influential work. Some of Prosen's early publications focused on non-verbal communication and also variations in facial features under different emotional circumstances. He developed a particular interest in adolescents and psychotherapy.

Prosen's interest in empathy prepared him well for his later work with primates, in particular bonobos, considered to be the most empathetic of all primates. Since 1998, he was psychiatric consultant to the Bonobo Species Preservation Society, assisting primatologists working with one of the largest collections of captive bonobo primates in the world at the Milwaukee County Zoo, studying bonobo culture and development. This work led to Prosen receiving numerous consultations from the United States and other parts of the world concerning psychological and other problems in primates. The rehabilitation of an emotionally disturbed young bonobo named "Brian" generated substantial publicity, including a story in The Atlantic as well as appearing in Laurel Braitman's 2014 book Animal Madness.

Prosen also promoted mental health awareness. Later in his career, after becoming aware of Australian biologist Jeremy Griffith’s thesis on the human condition in 2004, he became a noted advocate of Griffith's work, including writing the foreword to Griffith's 2014 book Is It to Be Terminal Alienation or Transformation for the Human Race? (republished in 2016 as Freedom: The End of the Human Condition ISBN 9781741290288).

== Personal life ==
Prosen died in Mequon, Wisconsin on 21 June 2021.

== Selected awards and positions ==
- MD (University of Manitoba)
- MSc (University of Manitoba)
- Diploma in Psychiatry (University of Manitoba)
- Fellow, The American Association for the Advancement of Science
- Fellow and Committee Member, The Royal College of Physicians and Surgeons of Canada
- Fellow of the American College of Psychiatrists
- Fellow of the Royal College of Psychiatrists, England
- Past President, Canadian Psychiatric Association
- Distinguished Life Fellow and Committee Member, The American Psychiatric Association
- America's Registry of Outstanding Professionals (2005–2006)
- American Board of Psychiatry and Neurology

== Selected bibliography ==
- Martin, R.; Prosen, H. (November 1972). "Mid-Life Crisis: Growth or Stagnation". Canadian Family Physician. 18 (11): 68–70. PMC 2370750. PMID 20468848.
- Prosen, H. (April 1973). "Maternal Deprivation and later Sexual Adjustment". Human Sexuality. 7 (4, 58 and 214).
- Prosen, H.; Toews, J.; Martin, R. (1981). Adolescent Psychiatry: The Life Cycle of the Family: Parental Midlife Crisis and Adolescent Rebellion. Vol. IX. Annals of the American Society for Adolescent Psychiatry. pp. 170–179.
- Prosen, H.; Chan, C. (1991). Medical Examination Review, Psychiatry (9 ed.). New York: Elsevier Science Publishing Company, Inc.
- Chan, C.; Prosen, H. (1995). Psychiatry: 700 Questions & Answers. Norwalk, Connecticut: Appleton & Lange.
