= Delevan =

Delevan can refer to:

- Edward C. Delavan, promoter of temperance
- Delevan, California
- Delevan, New York

== See also ==
- Delavan (disambiguation)
