= Desert Lake =

Desert Lake may refer to:

- Dry lake
- Desert Lake, California
- Desert Lake, Utah
- Desert Lake, Argentina
