= Ali Ali Awad =

Egyptian author

- Born: August 29, 1947 (age 78)
- Notable work: "The donkey knows everything" (Alhumar yaaref kul shai) "The ghoul" (Al-Ghoul) "Beloved homeland" (Alwatan Alhabeeb)

Ali Ali Awad (Arabic: علي علي عوض; born August 29, 1947, in Mansora) is an Egyptian author and a member of the Egyptian Writers Union, a member of the Union of Arab writers and intellectuals, vice president of Atelier Mansoura, and one of the founders of the Freedom Writers Association.

== Career ==
Ali Ali Awad started his writing career early when in 2006, he published his first collection entitled “the donkey knows everything” (Alhumar yaaref kul shai), It was followed that same year by “The ghoul” (Al-Ghoul) play, then his second play “Beloved homeland” (Alwatan Alhabeeb), which Is a children's play released in 2006. The year 2006 was a special year for the Egyptian writer, when he achieved a local fame due to the abundance of production and the number of sales of his first story collection. After two years, he published his second collection of stories and his fourth literary work “The house will fall” (Sayasqot Albait), before the publication in 2009 of his first novel “The stolen heart” (Al-Qalb Almasrouq), which played an important role in his fame in Arab states of the Persian Gulf. In 2010, Ali Ali Awad published his first children's novel “Dick’s diary” (Mothakarat Deek). In 2014, he published his second novel “infallibility in her hand” (Alesmah fi yadha). Ali Awad returned to write children's novel in 2016, through the novel “The Return of Charkas” (Awdat Sharkas), in the same year, her published a new story collection entitled “Smoke has another smell” (Lldukhan raiehah okhra). In the following year he published his third novel “The Tyrant” (Al-tagheyah).

== Works ==
This is a list of his most notable works:

- “The donkey knows everything” (original title: Alhumar yaaref kul shai) (story collection, 2006)
- “The ghoul” (original title: Al-Ghoul) (play, 2006).
- “Beloved homeland” (original title: Alwatan Alhabeeb) (children's play, 2006)
- “The house will fall” (original title: Sayasqot Albait) (story collection, 2008)
- “The stolen heart” (original title: Al-Qalb almasrouq) (2009)
- “Dick’s diary” (original title: Mothakarat Deek) (a children's novel, 2010)
- “Infallibility in her hand” (original title: Alesmah fi yadha) (2014)
- “The return of Cherks” (original title: Awdat Sharkas) (a children's novel, 2016)
- “Smoke has another smell” (original title: Lldukhan raiehah okhrah) (story collection, 2016)
- “The Tyrant” (original title: Al-tagheyah) (2017)

== Awards ==
In 1991, Ali Awad won the Kuwait people's committee award in Abu Dhabi in the short story competition. In 2012, he received the Palestine award for cultural creativity in Lebanon, the president of the Union of Arab writers and intellectuals in Paris also awarded him the medal of excellence in 2012. Awad won the first place in the novel category of the Freedom Writers Association, he also won first place in the category of the children's literature in the East Delta region cultural competition in 2013, as well as the short story prize in the grand creative competition of the old Sherif salon and the movement “Free creators” in July 2013. In 2015 he got Nali Noman Literary Award and, Hala Fahmy Creative Award.
