= De Luz, California =

Unincorporated community in California, United States

- Unincorporated community
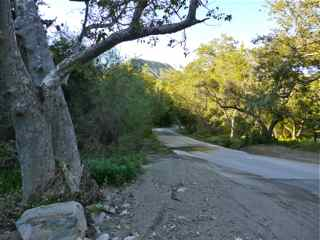

- Location within California Location within the United States
- Coordinates: 33°26′13″N 117°19′28″W
- Country: United States
- State: California
- County: Riverside; San Diego
- Elevation: 364 ft (111 m)
- Time zone: UTC-8 (Pacific (PST))
  - Summer (DST): UTC-7 (PDT)
- Area codes: 442/760
- GNIS feature ID: 1656476

De Luz (Spanish for "Of Light") is an unincorporated community in San Diego County, California. De Luz is 6 miles (9.7 km) northwest of Fallbrook and due west of Temecula. The region is approximately 12 miles (19 km) east of the Pacific Ocean and lies at the southern end of the Santa Ana Mountains.

== History ==
De Luz was informally founded in the 1870s when homesteaders arrived in the area to establish cattle farms. The etymology of De Luz is disputed; some have claimed it was a Spanish translation of a local English rancher named Luce while others have claimed the town's name came from a Californio named Jose de Luz. The literal Spanish translation of De Luz is "of light."

De Luz was briefly accessible by train in the late-19th century due to the California Southern Railroad traversing the town on its route north that connected with the Atchison, Topeka and Santa Fe Railway near San Bernardino. The route from San Diego to San Bernardino was subject to frequent washouts in various parts of Temecula Canyon which inflicted costly repairs on the railroad. The rail line through De Luz was subjected to reduced service when the Surf Line was completed in 1888. Train service to De Luz ceased in 1916.

Due to the geography of the area, De Luz has had a history of flooding. In 1916, the town's post office was destroyed in the same flood that totaled the town's rail infrastructure. A much smaller post office, reportedly only 10 square feet (0.93 m^{2}), was constructed on higher ground following the flood. The small post office closed in 1955.

DeLuz Road, a small two-lane road that goes north from De Luz through the Santa Ana Mountains, was constructed in 1898 after local residents requested that the towns of De Luz and Murrieta be connected.
