= Washout (erosion) =

Sudden erosion of terrain

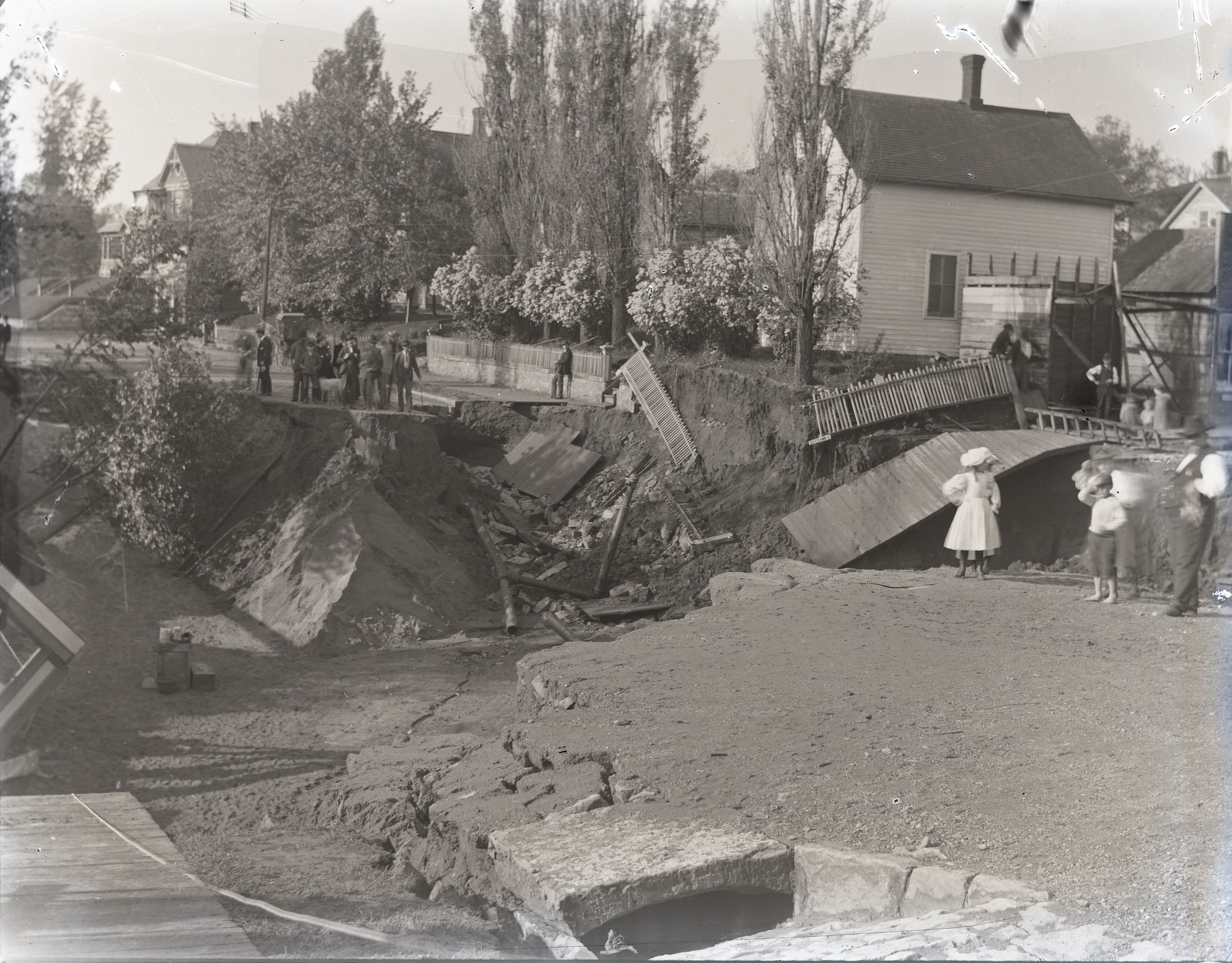
Washout following a flood in Stillwater, Minnesota in May 1894

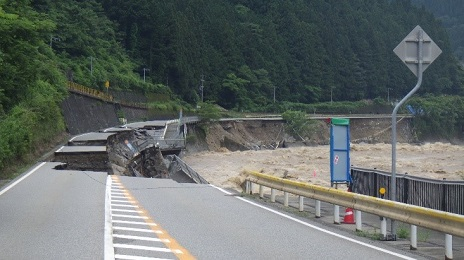
Washout damage to Japan National Route 41

A washout is the sudden erosion of soft soil or other support surfaces by a gush of water, usually occurring during a heavy downpour of rain (a flash flood) or other stream flooding. These downpours may occur locally in a thunderstorm or over a large area, such as following the landfall of a tropical cyclone. If a washout occurs in a crater-like formation, it is called a sinkhole, and it usually involves a leaking or broken water main or sewerage pipes. Other types of sinkholes, such as collapsed caves, are not washouts.

Widespread washouts can occur in mountainous areas after heavy rains, even in normally dry ravines. A severe washout can become a landslide, or cause a dam break in an earthen dam. Like other forms of erosion, most washouts can be prevented by vegetation whose roots hold the soil and/or slow the flow of surface and underground water. Deforestation increases the risk of washouts. Retaining walls and culverts may be used to try to prevent washouts, although particularly severe washouts may even destroy these if they are not large or strong enough.

== Effect on road and rail transport ==
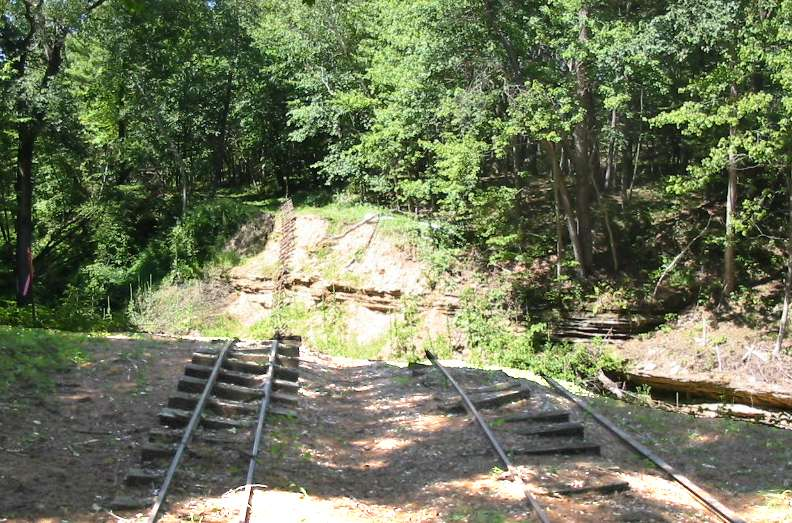
A washout occurred on the Riverside and Great Northern Railway in Wisconsin Dells, Wisconsin, on June 11, 2004.

In road and rail transport, a washout is the result of a natural disaster where the roadbed is eroded away by flowing water, usually as the result of a flood. When a washout destroys a railroad's right-of-way, the track is sometimes left suspended in midair across the newly formed gap, or it dips down into a ditch. This phenomenon is discussed in more detail under the term erosion. Bridges may collapse due to bridge scour around one or more bridge abutments or piers.

In 2004, the remnants of Hurricane Frances, and then Hurricane Ivan, caused a large number of washouts in western North Carolina and other parts of the southern Appalachian Mountains, closing some roads for days and parts of the Blue Ridge Parkway for months. Other washouts have also caused train wrecks where tracks have been unknowingly undermined. Motorists have also driven into flooded streams at night, unaware of a new washout on the road in front of them until it is too late to brake, sometimes prompting a high-water rescue.

Major washouts can also ruin pipelines or undermine utility poles or underground lines, interrupting public utilities.

== See also ==
- Bridge scour
- Flash flood
- Washaway
