= Delavan Lake, Wisconsin =

Census-designated place in Wisconsin, United States

- CDP
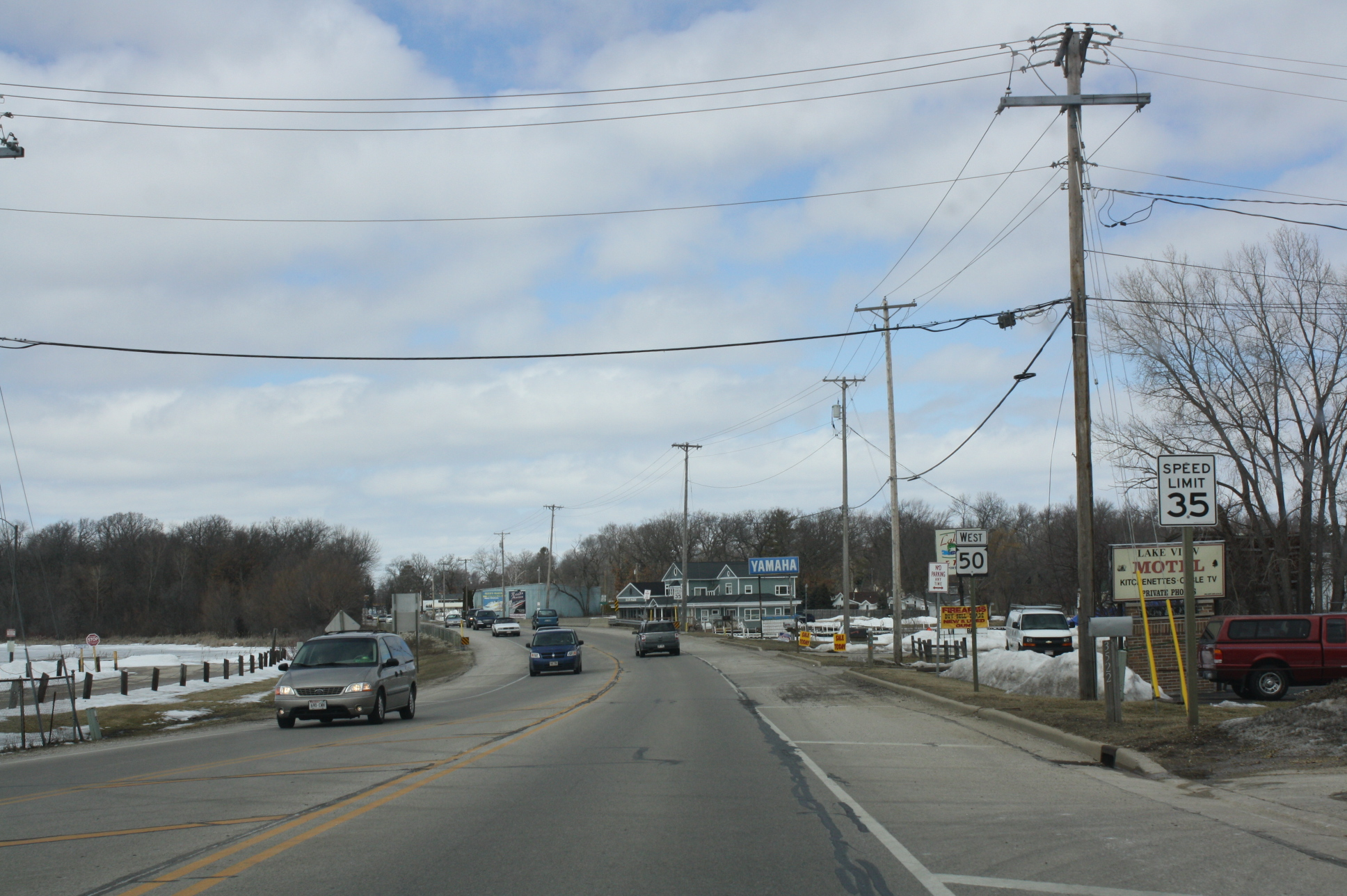
- Delavan Lake on WIS 50

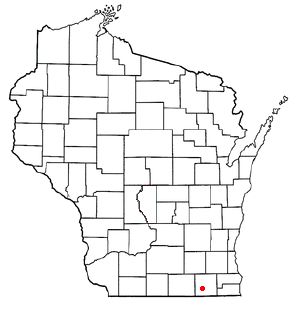
- Location of Delavan Lake, Wisconsin
- Coordinates: 42°36′7″N 88°37′21″W
- Country: United States
- State: Wisconsin
- County: Walworth

Area
  - Total: 6.0 sq mi (15.5 km^{2})
  - Land: 3.6 sq mi (9.2 km^{2})
  - Water: 2.4 sq mi (6.3 km^{2})
- Elevation: 938 ft (286 m)

Population (2020)
  - Total: 2,803
  - Density: 790/sq mi (300/km^{2})
- Time zone: UTC-6 (Central (CST))
  - Summer (DST): UTC-5 (CDT)
- Zip: 53116
- Area code: 262
- FIPS code: 55-19500
- GNIS feature ID: 1563875

Delavan Lake is a census-designated place (CDP) in the towns of Delavan and Walworth, Walworth County, Wisconsin, United States. The population was 2,803 at the 2020 census. It is located near the shore of Delavan Lake.

== Geography ==
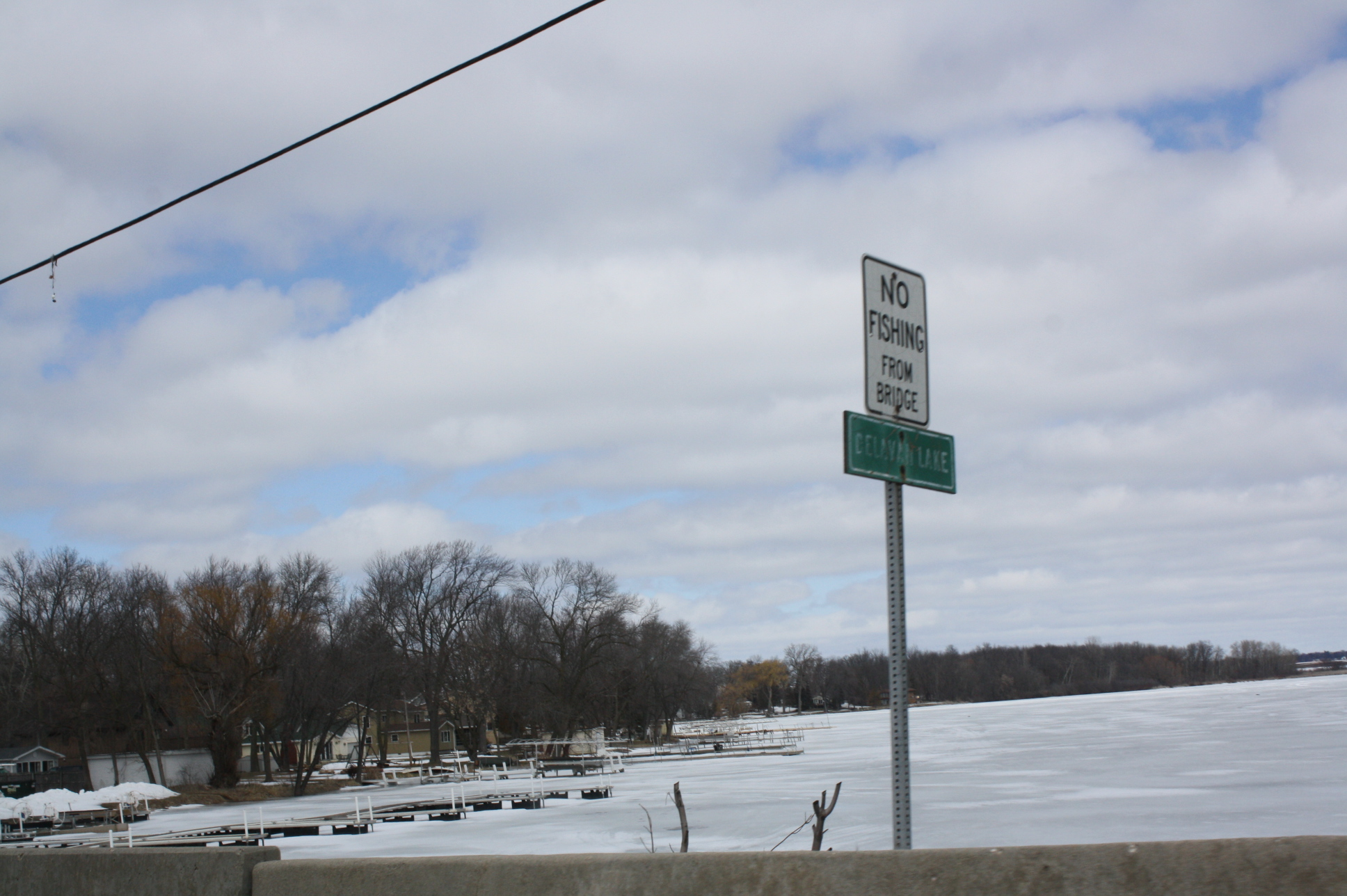
Frozen Delavan Lake (the lake)

Delavan Lake is located at 42°36′7″N 88°37′21″W (42.601840, -88.622456).

According to the United States Census Bureau, the CDP has a total area of 6.0 square miles (15.5 km^{2}), of which 3.5 square miles (9.2 km^{2}) is land and 2.4 square miles (6.3 km^{2}) (40.64%) is water.

The maximum depth of Delavan Lake, which is near the CDP of Delavan Lake, is 52 feet, with seaweed growth prevalent at the lake ground floor. The lake's water clarity is on average low.

== Demographics ==
Historical population
Census	Pop.	Note	%±
2000	2,352		—
2010	2,649		12.6%
2020	2,803		5.8%
U.S. Decennial Census

As of the census of 2000, there were 2,352 people, 944 households, and 623 families residing in the CDP. The population density was 663.4 people per square mile (255.8/km^{2}). There were 1,920 housing units at an average density of 541.6/sq mi (208.8/km^{2}). The racial makeup of the CDP was 92.98% White, 0.34% African American, 0.17% Native American, 0.43% Asian, 0.04% Pacific Islander, 4.80% from other races, and 1.23% from two or more races. Hispanic or Latino of any race were 8.50% of the population.

There were 944 households, out of which 28.6% had children under the age of 18 living with them, 54.1% were married couples living together, 7.6% had a female householder with no husband present, and 34.0% were non-families. 27.0% of all households were made up of individuals, and 9.9% had someone living alone who was 65 years of age or older. The average household size was 2.49 and the average family size was 3.06.

In the CDP, the population was spread out, with 25.4% under the age of 18, 6.5% from 18 to 24, 29.3% from 25 to 44, 24.1% from 45 to 64, and 14.6% who were 65 years of age or older. The median age was 38 years. For every 100 females, there were 102.1 males. For every 100 females age 18 and over, there were 100.0 males.

The median income for a household in the CDP was $45,192, and the median income for a family was $53,324. Males had a median income of $37,500 versus $22,295 for females. The per capita income for the CDP was $24,067. About 2.4% of families and 5.7% of the population were below the poverty line, including 6.8% of those under age 18 and 8.4% of those age 65 or over.
