= Duncan Springs, California =

Unincorporated community in California, United States

Duncan Springs
- Unincorporated community
- Location in California Duncan Springs (the United States)
- Coordinates: 38°57′08″N 123°07′29″W
- Country: United States
- State: California
- County: Mendocino County
- Elevation: 781 ft (238 m)

Duncan Springs (formerly, Duncan Mineral Springs) is a set of springs and the site of a resort from the 1880s in Mendocino County, California, United States. Waring 1915, p. 167 It is located 1.5 miles (2.4 km) south-southwest of Hopland, at an elevation of 781 feet (238 m).

Duncan Springs was a resort by the 1880s.
