= Milwaukee County Zoo =

Zoo in Milwaukee, Wisconsin, U.S.

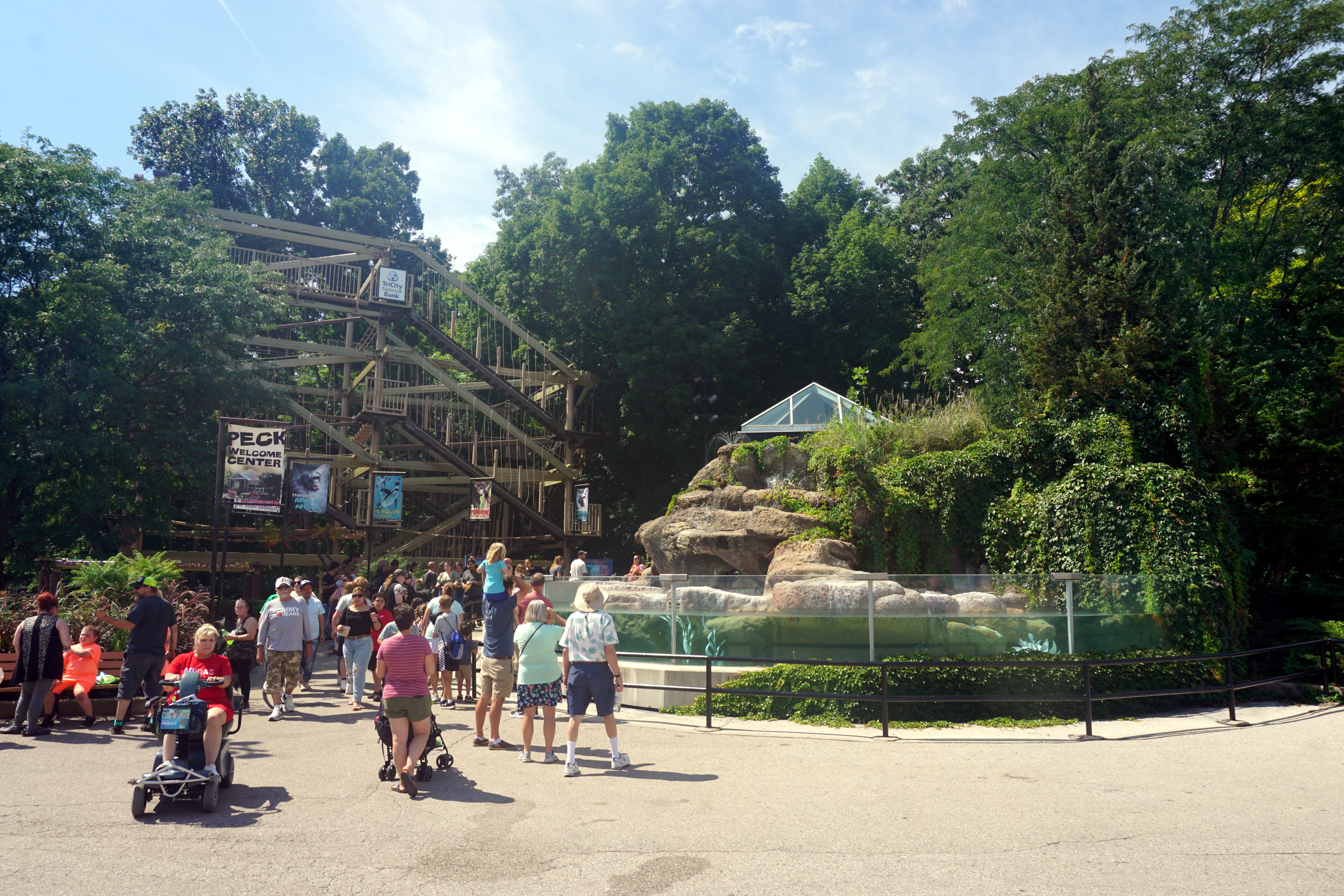
- Main Entrance
- Interactive map of Milwaukee County Zoo
- 43°1′57.5724″N 88°2′14.64″W
- Date opened: January 16, 1892 (Washington Park site); May 13, 1961 (current site)
- Location: 10001 W. Bluemound Rd. Milwaukee, Wisconsin
- Land area: 200 acres (81 ha)
- No. of animals: 3,100
- No. of species: 350
- Annual visitors: 1.3 million
- Memberships: Association of Zoos and Aquariums
- Major exhibits: Aviary; Apes of Africa/Primates of the World; Aquatic and Reptile Center; Small Mammal Building (permanently closed in 2025); Large Mammals; Northwestern Mutual Family Farm
- Public transit: MCTS; Waukesha Metro
- Website: www.milwaukeezoo.org

The Milwaukee County Zoo is a zoo in Milwaukee, Wisconsin that is operated by the Milwaukee County Parks Commission, covering an area of 190 acres (77 ha).

The zoo averages about 1.3 million visitors a year and houses 3,100 animals from 350 species.

The zoo is accredited by the Association of Zoos and Aquariums.

In 2017, the zoo was among the first seven zoos to be certified for its "humane treatment of animals" by the American Humane Society. As of 2025, the "Humane Certified" program had grown to encompass 42 zoos and aquariums within the United States.

The zoo is noted for the second birth of polar bears and siamangs in captivity and for their locally famous gorilla Samson, who lived from 1950 to 1981 and whose bones are now on display at the Milwaukee Public Museum. During World War II, a celebrity animal of the zoo was Gertie the Duck and her ducklings.

The zoo is also home to one of the largest group of bonobos in one location outside their native Democratic Republic of the Congo, and has two cheetahs from the National Zoo in Washington, DC.

== History ==
=== The Washington Park Zoo ===
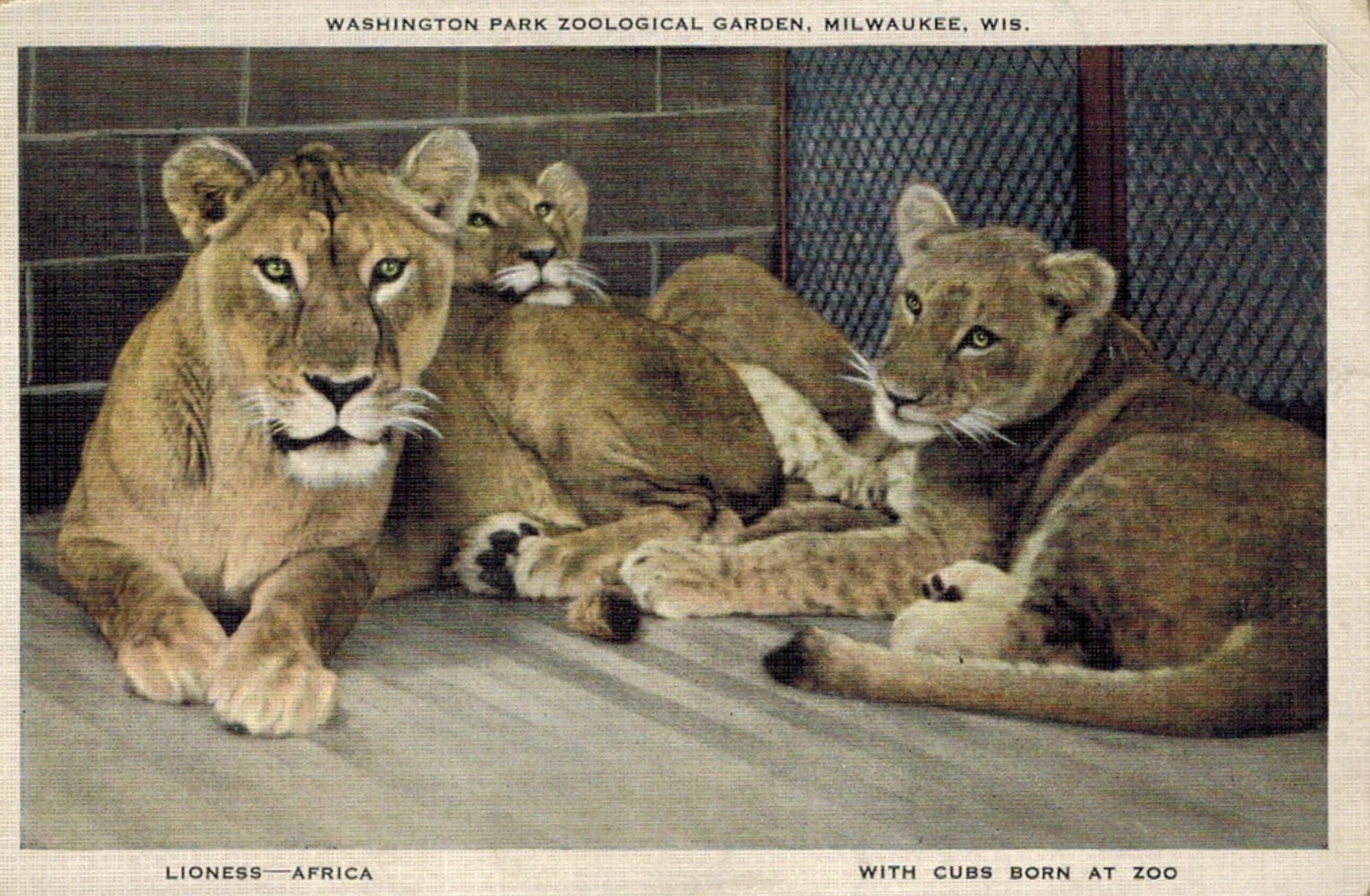
Lion exhibit (1937)

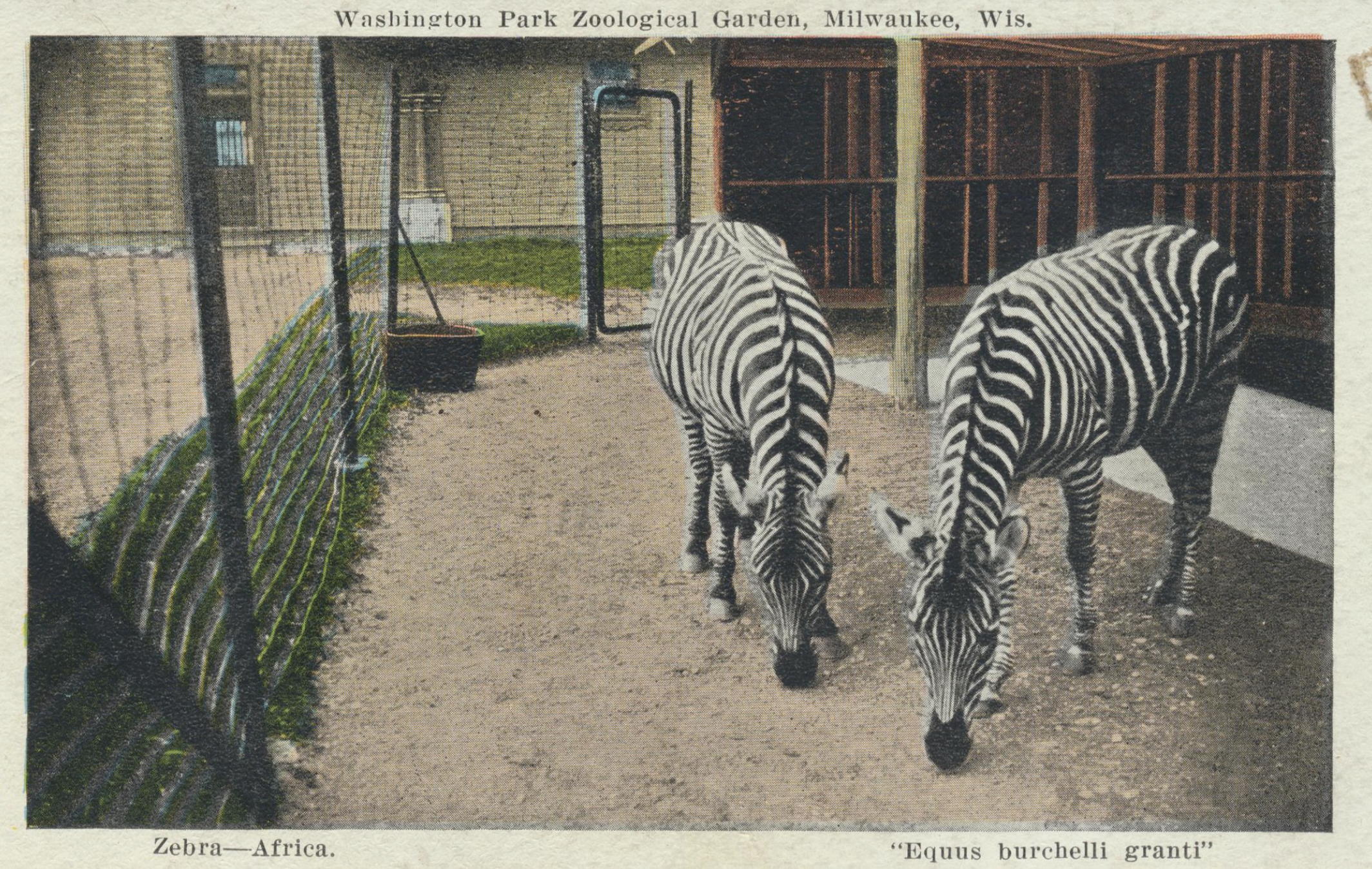
Zebras at the zoo (1949)

In 1892, the West Park Zoo opened, displaying small mammals and birds.

The following year, in 1893, the zoo added two cinnamon bears and created an iron bear den.

In 1899, the zoo constructed an herbivore building that housed a variety of animals, at a cost of US$2,137 (equivalent to $82,702 in 2025).

In 1900, West Park Zoo became Washington Park Zoo. Two years later, in 1902, the zoo was expanded to 23 acres (9.3 ha).

Even with the Great Depression of the 1930s, the zoo prospered, creating a bear den that resembled the natural habitat of bears.

In 1931, the zoo's bear collection contained 37 specimens.

By 1937, the Washington Park Zoo was beginning to show its age.

In 1942, a reptile exhibit was opened in the main zoo building.

In 1947, zoo director George Speidel began planning a new zoo.

=== The Milwaukee County Zoo ===
In 1953, although still located in Washington Park, the zoo changed its name to the Milwaukee County Zoological Gardens.

In 1956, fundraising took place to offset the estimated cost for building the new zoo of US$12.6 million (equivalent to $149.2 million in 2025). The Milwaukee County Zoo opened in 1958 with the primate building, monkey island, feline house, pachyderm mall, and grizzly bear den. The zoo also opened with a 15 in (381 mm) gauge miniature railway, the Zoo Line, which carried visitors around the zoo to view the exhibits and construction. The Zoo Line (now known as the Safari Train) has continued to run, operating with real steam locomotives.

In 1959, construction started on the dall sheep mountain and the Alaskan bear exhibit.

On May 13, 1961 (65 years ago), the Milwaukee County Zoo officially opened to the public.

=== Zoo expansions ===
Later additions included the aviary (1962), the Australian building (1963), the original animal hospital (1963), the small mammal building (1965), the aquarium (1968), and the reptile building (1968).

In 1965, four Zoomobile tour trains were donated by Allis-Chalmers.

This was followed by the children's zoo (1971), and the polar bear underwater viewing exhibit (1986).

In 1986, the children's zoo was renamed the Stackner Heritage Farm, and a dairy complex was constructed as part of it, to celebrate Wisconsin as America's Dairyland. The complex included a cow barn, education center, and dairy store.

In 1988, the Taylor Family Humboldt penguin exhibit, the education center, and the Peck Welcome Center opened.

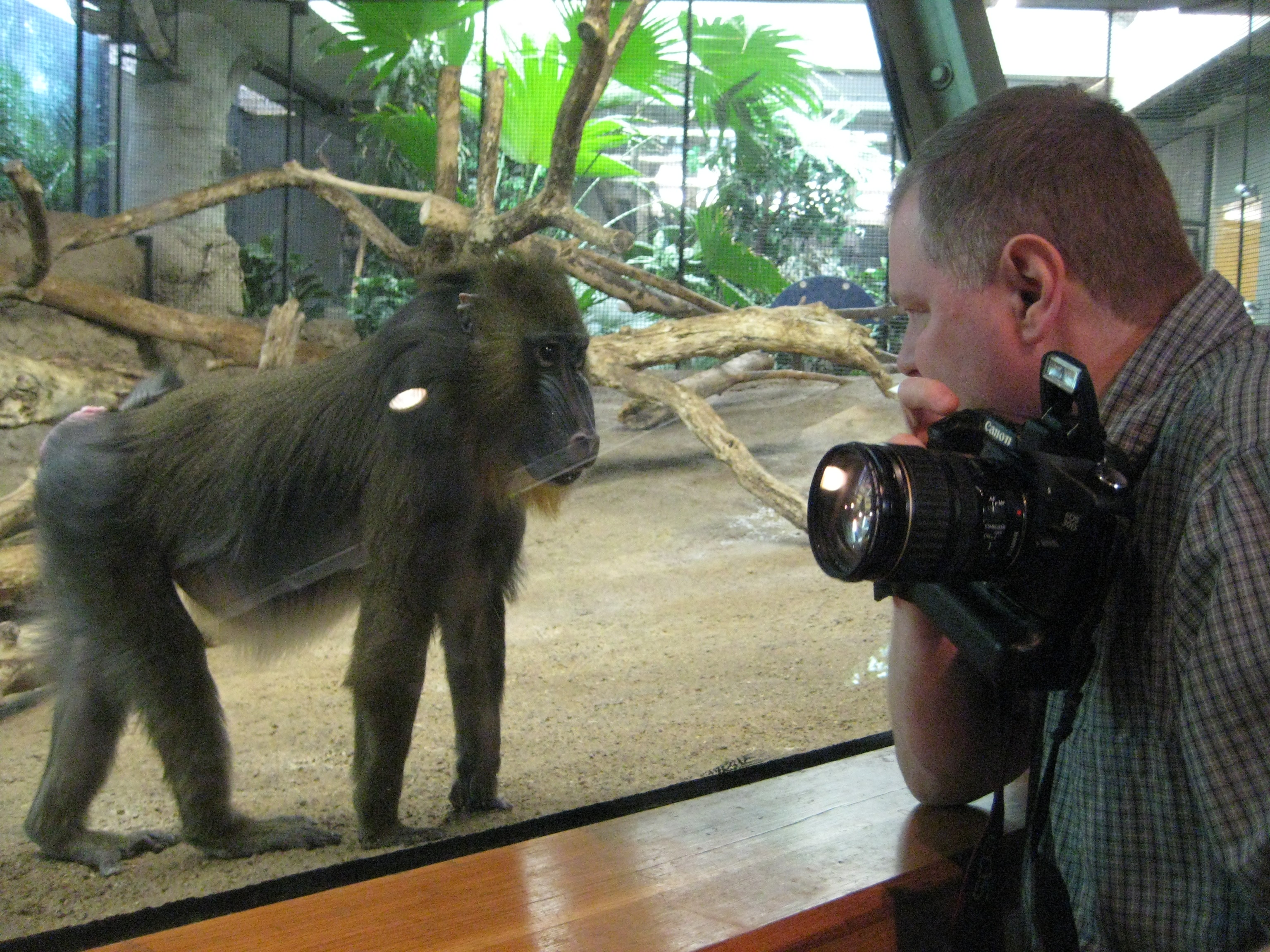
Mandrillus sphinx exhibit (2010)

In the following years, the renovated sea lion exhibit, featuring underwater viewing, opened, and the aviary was renovated. More recent changes include the addition of the Sterns Family Apes of Africa exhibit (1992), the renovation of the aquarium and reptile building (now known as the Aquatic and Reptile Center), the renovation of the small mammal building (1998), and the addition of the Wong Family Pheasantry (1998).

In 2002, Monkey Island was renovated to include a large deck for viewing, and was renamed Macaque Island. 2003 featured a newly remodeled animal health center; 2004, a new education center; and 2005 and 2006, the remodeling of the Heritage Farm, feline building, and giraffe exhibit.

In 2014, the zoo put forth a new construction plan that was to include: a new West Entrance with a gift shop; a new North American river otter exhibit, due to the small size of the existing tank in the Small Mammal House building; and a new parking lot to mitigate problems arising from the rebuilding of the Zoo Interchange to the southeast of the zoo property by the Wisconsin Department of Transportation.

== Exhibits ==
=== Taylor Family Humboldt Penguin Pool ===
This is an exhibit near the zoo's Main Entrance that features a group of Humboldt penguins. This 15,000-U.S.-gallon (57,000-liter; 12,000-imperial-gallon) tank is surrounded with underwater viewing glass.

=== Herb and Nada Mahler Family Aviary ===
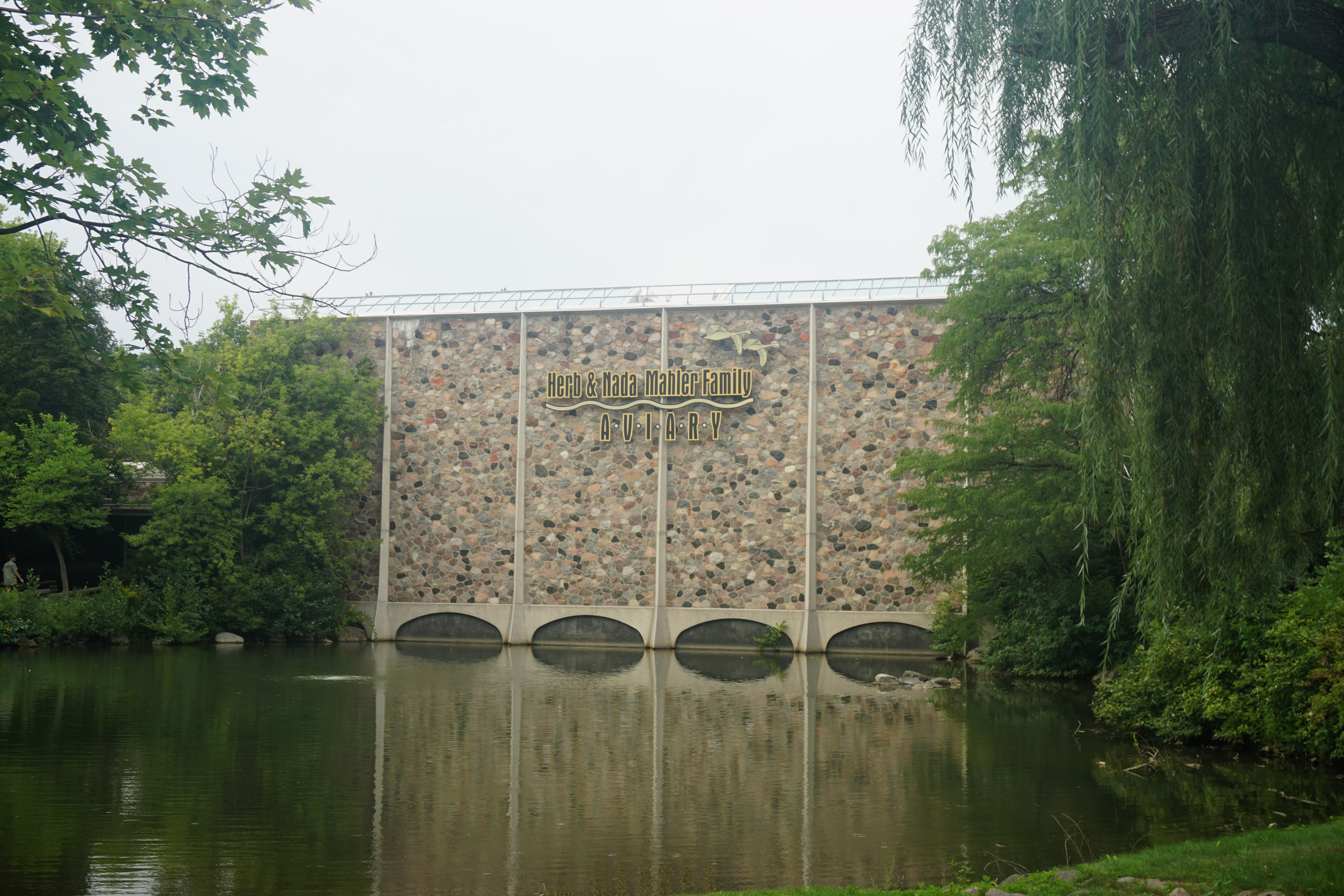
Exterior of the Herb and Nada Mahler Family Aviary

The aviary contains over 60 species in a walk-through building. One section is a cageless room where birds fly free. Species at the Zoo include Caribbean flamingo, scarlet ibis, rhinoceros hornbill, Bali mynah, Egyptian plover, rockhopper penguin, gentoo penguin, red-billed hornbill, the whooping crane, Inca tern and sunbittern, as well as various pigeons and herons.

=== Sterns Family Apes of Africa ===
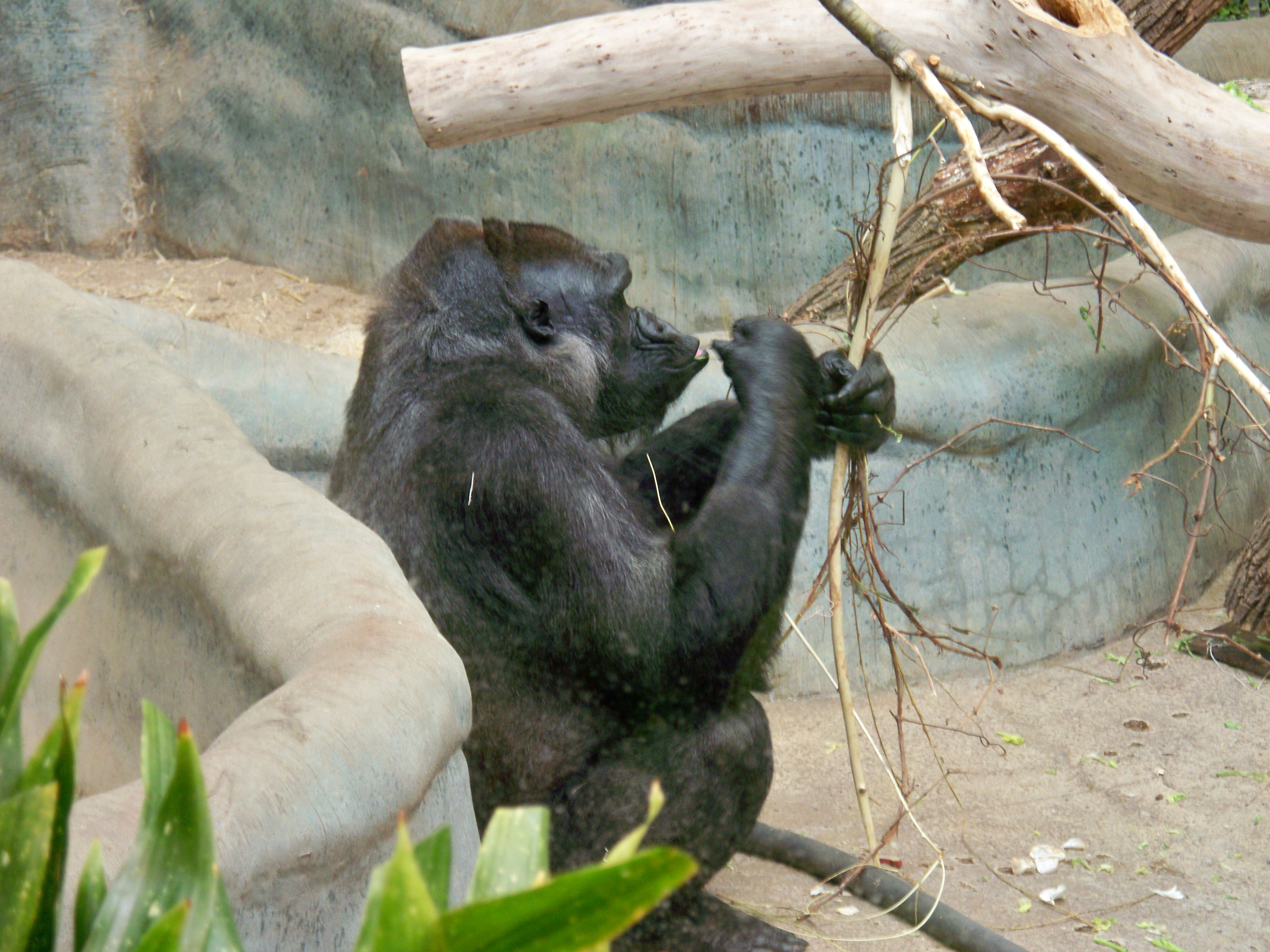
A foraging gorilla in the Sterns Building at the Milwaukee County Zoo

Opened in 1992 at the cost of $10.7 million, this indoor building features a large troop of bonobos and gorillas. The zoo maintains a bonobo breeding program with one of the largest collections of bonobos in professional care in the world. Both species have access to indoor and outdoor exhibits.

As of 2018, the zoo will have a total of four Western lowland gorillas, after the death of 31-year-old dominant male Cassius and 17-year-old Naku in April.

=== Primates of the World ===
Adjacent to Apes of Africa, this exhibit showcases primates from the around the world, including Bornean orangutans, a siamang, eastern black-and-white colobus, and black-handed spider monkeys in a gallery-style exhibit. For many years, Samson, the largest gorilla in professional care, was showcased in the Primates of the World building. The zoo featured one of the first births of a Siamang in professional care. The exhibit is set to be renovated sometime in the next 5-10 years alongside Apes of Africa as part of the zoo's strategic plan.

=== Macaque Island ===
Macaque Island features a troop of Japanese macaques. It is a large mountain surrounded by water. It was remodeled in 2002 to include a large viewing deck for zoo guests and an expanded shelter for the resident macaques, with waterfalls and a larger mountain.

=== Aquatic and Reptile Center ===
This building holds invertebrates, fish, reptiles, and amphibians including Chinese alligators, green anacondas, Gila monsters, red-tailed boas, panther chameleons, several poison dart frogs, tomato frogs, king cobras, several other species of reptiles, amphibians, freshwater and saltwater fish.

=== Small Mammal Building ===
This building, located near the Aquatic and Reptile Center, features a special room for nocturnal species that is darkened in the day and brightened at night so the animals live on a schedule friendly to zoo visitors. Residents include fennec fox, prehensile-tailed porcupine, Prevost's squirrel, Pygmy slow loris, ring-tailed lemur, straw-coloured fruit bat, Mohol bushbaby, Southern three-banded armadillo, cotton-top tamarins, and a larger exhibit for Hoffmann's two-toed sloths. Other species are sometimes rotated in and out, such as the zoo's red pandas during construction of the Florence Mila Borchert Big Cat Country building in 2004. The Small Mammal Building closed in 2025.

=== North America ===
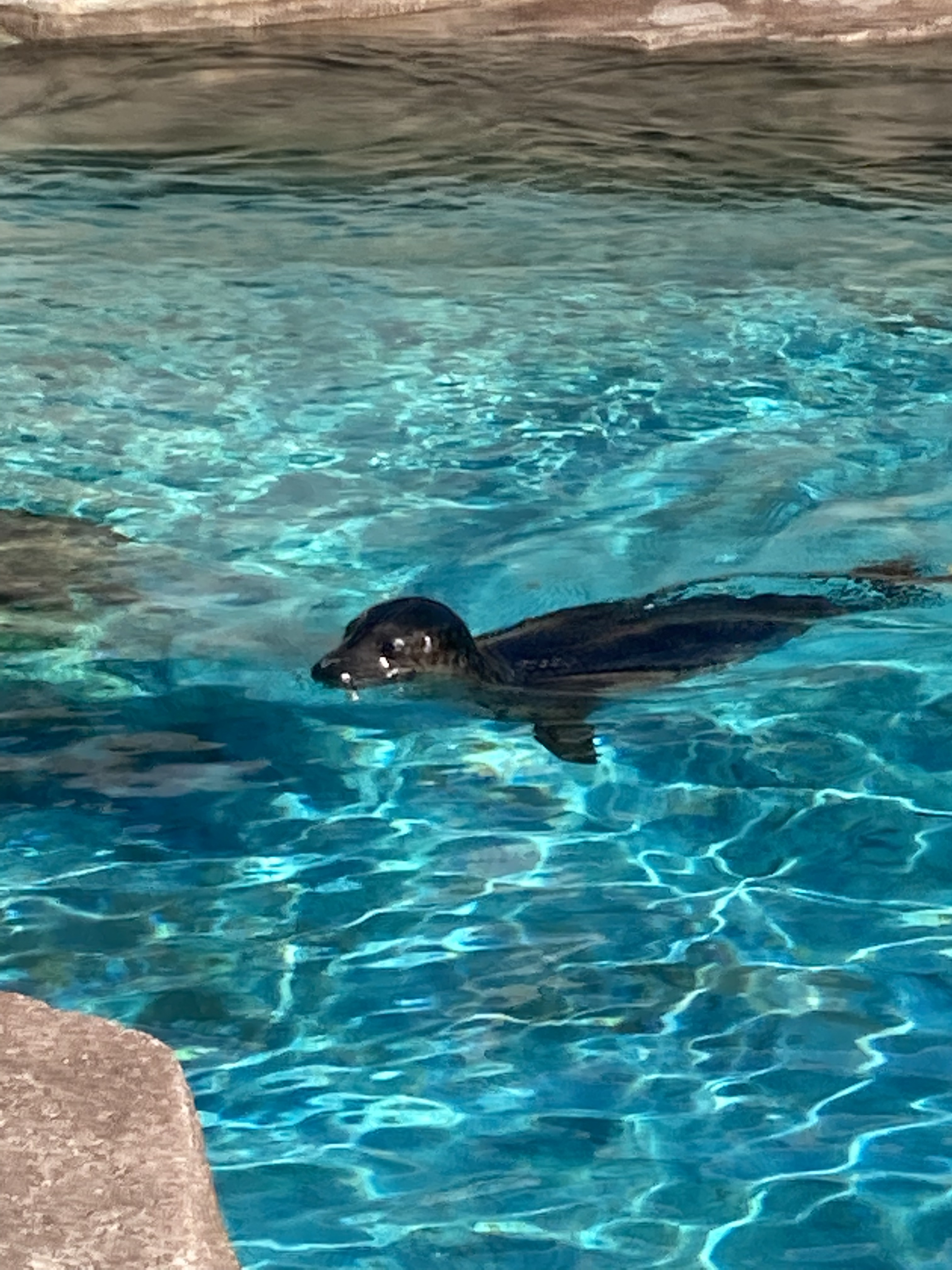
Harbor Seal, Milwaukee County Zoo, 2021

A series of outdoor exhibits themed around the megafauna of the North American continent featuring grizzly bear, Alaskan brown bear, American elk, trumpeter swan, harbor seal, prairie dog, American badger, and reindeer. Many of these species like the reindeer and the grizzlys are displayed in predator-prey "panorama" exhibits, which make them appear to share the space via a hidden moat.

=== Northwestern Mutual Family Farm ===
The newly renovated children's zoo with a focus on native midwestern United States wildlife and educational presentations, featuring species such as hedgehogs, domestic ducks, North American porcupine, red-tailed hawk and barred owl. It replaced the zoo's Stackner Heritage Farm in 2005. Northwestern Mutual Family Farm also features a two breeds of pig, Guinea Hog and Kunekune, along with many breed of cattle such as the Ayrshire cattle, Belted Galloways, Holstein Friesian cattle, Milking Shorthorns, Scottish highland cattle and other farm animals such as Sicilian donkey, chickens, goats, rabbits and horses.

=== Africa/Asia/South America Mixed Exhibits ===
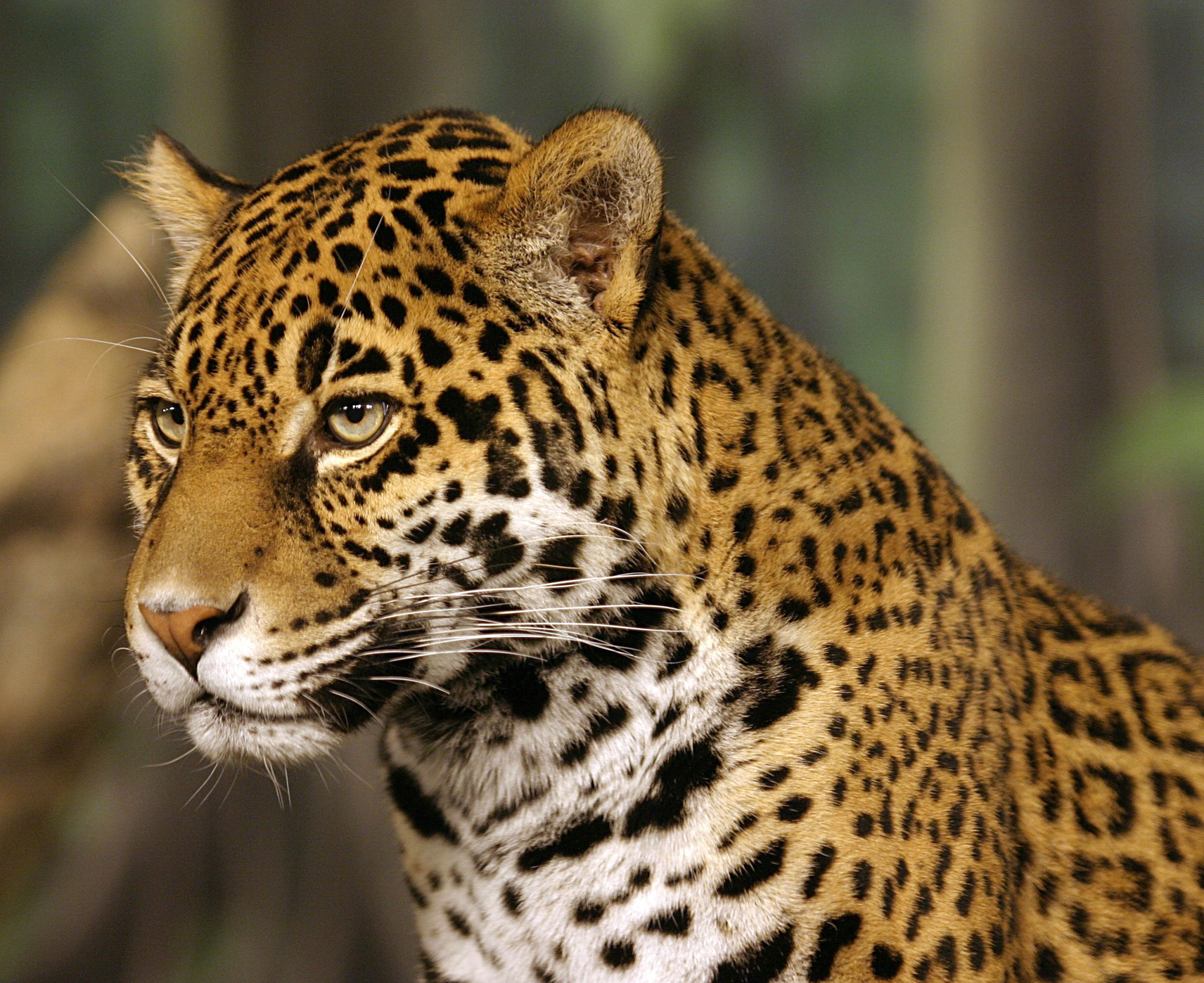
Jaguar at the zoo

A series out of outdoor exhibits featuring animals from South America, Asia, and Africa, along with 2 new rescued American white pelicans. Some of the animals are in "panorama"-style displays in which the predator and the prey appear in the same exhibit due to hidden moats. Much of the space is currently being transformed into a multi phase project known as Adventure Africa, so the majority of the exhibits are dedicated to animals from the African savannah, including an African waterhole exhibit for plains zebra, waterbuck, greater kudu, and an outdoor predator/prey setup yard for rotating spotted hyenas and African lions, an African savannah exhibit for the pelicans, cinereous vultures, Thomson's gazelles, southern ground hornbills and an outdoor predator/prey setup yard for cheetahs, an exhibit for red river hogs, an indoor exhibit for servals, and an exhibit for reticulated giraffes.

South American species include greater rheas, Baird's tapirs, alpacas, red-footed tortoises, yellow-footed tortoises and an outdoor predator/prey setup yard for jaguars. Asian species include an exhibit for Bactrian camels, free-roaming Indian peafowl, and an outdoor predator/prey setup yard for Amur tigers, an exhibit for red pandas, an exhibit for snow leopards and the old black rhino exhibit now contains two Domestic yaks. The Giraffe House, part of the same exhibit area, was renovated in 2006, allowing visitors to climb a deck and come face-to-face with the zoo's reticulated giraffe herd and even feed them. The giraffe exhibit is also an exhibit that remains the same at the Adventure Africa exhibit, and in the middle of the enclosures is a building called the Florence Mila Borchert Big Cat country which has indoor and outdoor areas for the African lions, cheetahs, servals, hyenas, tigers, snow leopards, red pandas, and jaguars.

=== Adventure Africa ===
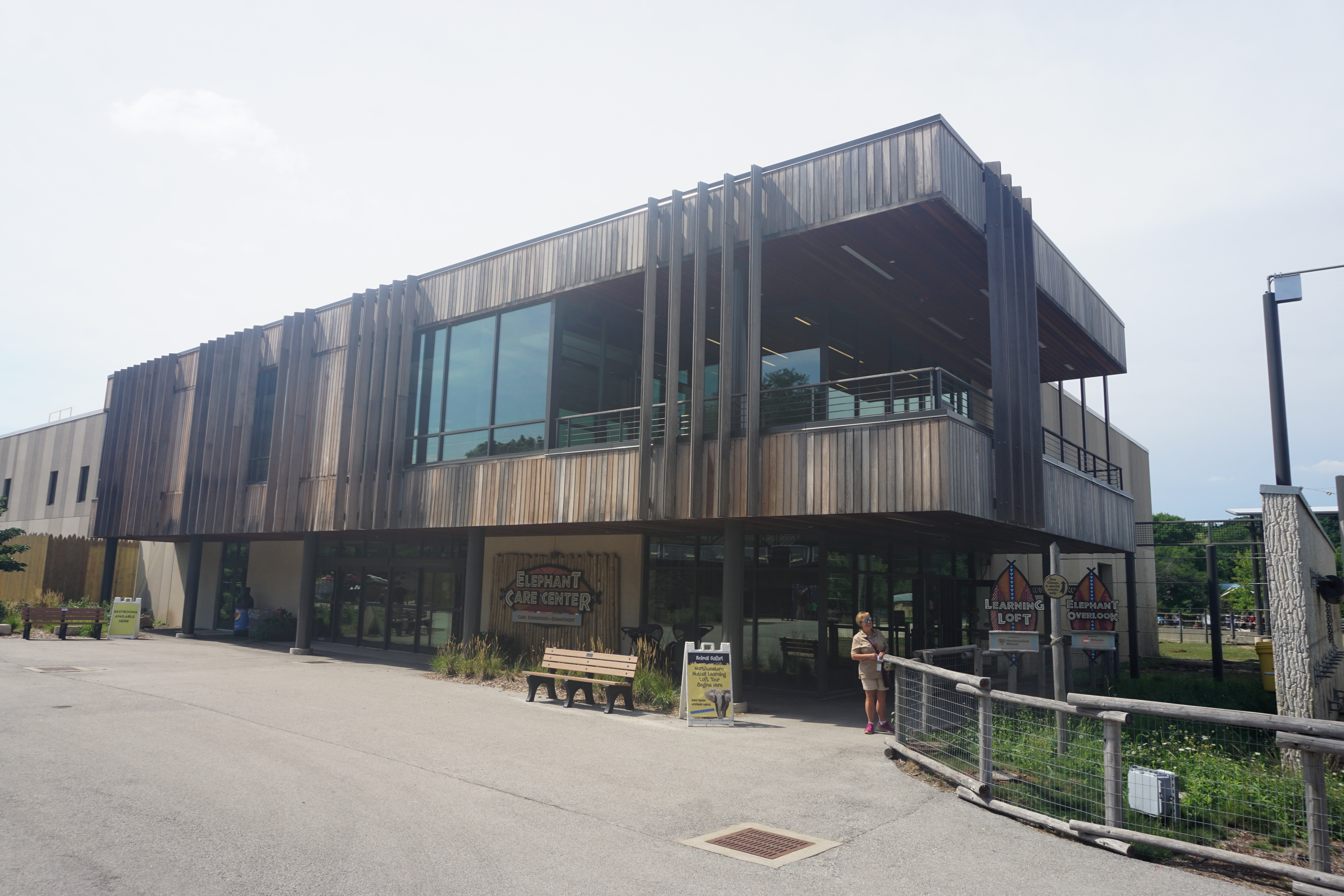
Elephant Care Center (2022)

In the spring of 2019, summer of 2020 and winter of 2025 respectively, Adventure Africa phases 1, 2 and 3 opened.

The first phase was a new home for African bush elephants and seven other animal species, four of which were transferred from their old exhibits. The new Elephant Care Center acts as both an indoor shelter and a recreation and training facility for the elephants, as well as a space for zoo classes and events. The elephants also have access to a 1.6-acre (0.65 ha; 6,500 m^{2}) outdoor habitat with various enrichment opportunities, including a large watering hole and enrichment feeding walls. Heaters placed throughout the yard allow the elephants to utilize the space during colder weather. Impala Plains is one of two mixed exhibits in Adventure Africa; it contains impalas, ostriches, and grey crowned cranes. Another exhibit, the African forest, is home to eastern bongos and crested guineafowl.

The second phase was a new hippo enclosure called the Hippo Haven, which has education boards around the exhibit, and an underwater viewing for their Hippopotamuses.

The third and final phase to the adventure Africa master plan was a new exhibit called the Rhino Care Center that converted the old elephant and current rhino habitats, and turned them into a new space for Eastern black rhinoceroses, an indoor habitat connecting to the Hippo Haven and indoor and outdoor habitats for Plains zebras and Red river hogs.

=== Otter Passage ===
In Spring 2018, the otter passage opened alongside the new West Entrance. It is home to a group of river otters in a large exhibit with two pools for underwater viewing. It operates much like the Taylor Family Humboldt Penguin Pool in that visitors can choose one of multiple entrances to optionally experience an introduction to the exhibit.

=== Otto Borchert Family Special Exhibits Gallery ===
This building is dedicated to special or traveling exhibits. These special exhibits include:

- Body Worlds: Animal Inside Out, one of a series of Body Worlds exhibitions featuring a series of plastinated animal sculptures of a gorilla, an elephant, a giraffe, a caribou, a tiger, a great white shark holding a seal in his mouth, a bear, a lion pouncing on an oryx from behind, a winged unicorn, a horse, and a yak, among others.

=== Strategic Plan ===
This renovation scheduled to begin construction in the next 5-10 years will have 3 major renovation projects to come to the zoo. The first is an exhibit called the Latin America Tropics which will have habitats for Jaguars, Tapirs, Capybaras, Green anacondas and other small rainforest and coral reef animals. As aforementioned it will also renovate the current Primates of the World and Apes of Africa exhibit. The final project called The Wild North will create habitats for either Polar bears or Brown bears, Moose, Wolves, Cougars, Wolverines, Eagles and Cranes.

== Other Facilities ==
=== Safari Train ===
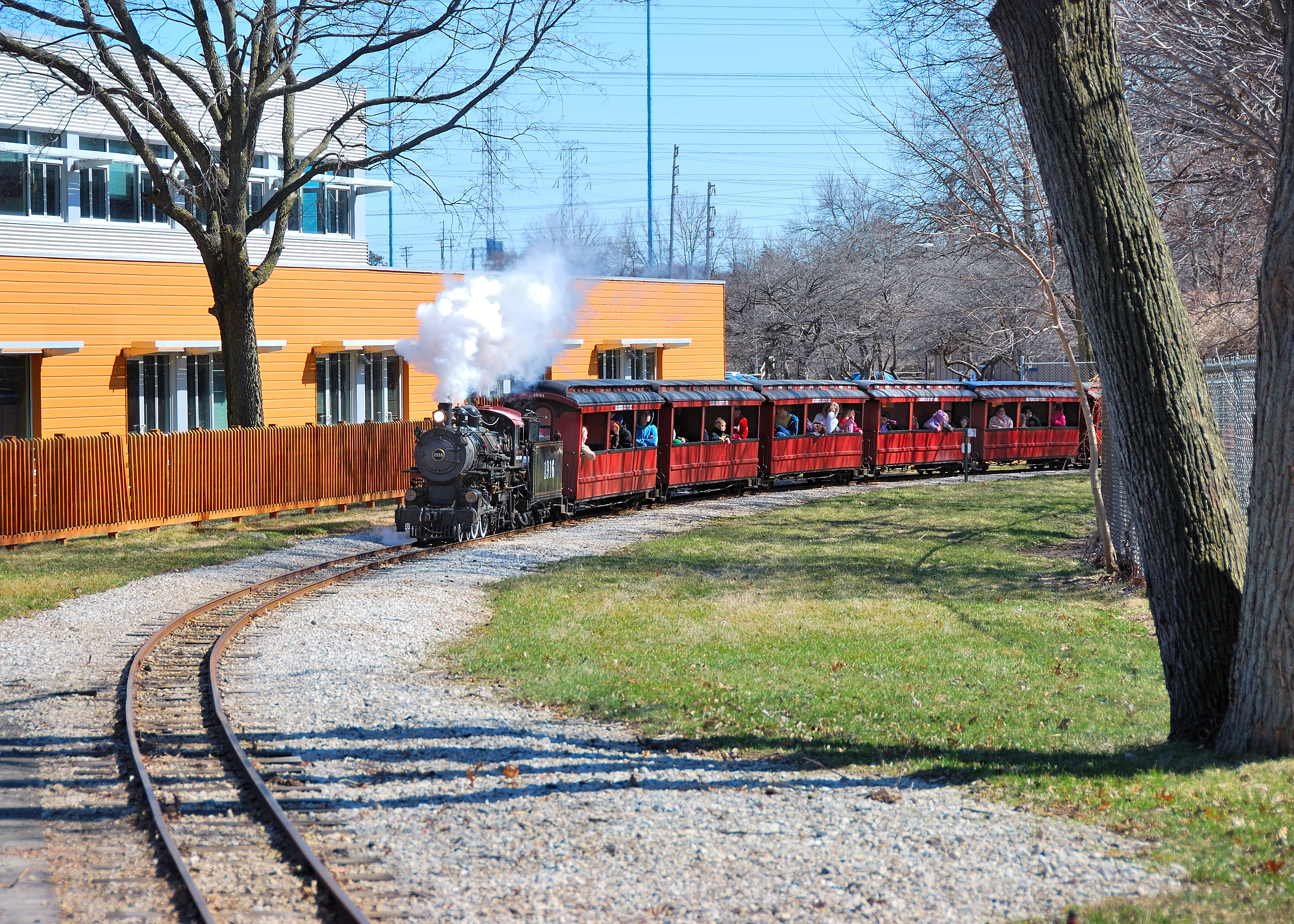
The Safari Train, 2009

The 15 in (381 mm) gauge rideable miniature railway, first opened in 1958, continues to transport guests around the zoo when weather allows.

The railroad began operations using live steam locomotive #82, a 4-4-0 locomotive built in 1957 by the Sandley Light Railway Works of Wisconsin Dells, on commission of the Milwaukee Journal for the zoo. The #82 was later joined by #1958, a diesel locomotive built in 1959, followed by two additional steam locomotives: #1916, a 4-4-2 locomotive built in 1961, and #1924, a 4-6-2 locomotive built for the zoo in 1977.

The #82 was eventually withdrawn, due to being too small to pull the longer trains the zoo needed to handle the crowds, and was placed on display. In 1989, the zoo loaned #82 to the recently rebuilt Riverside and Great Northern Railway, and later traded the engine to the R&GN for a second diesel, #1992.

In March 2024, it was announced that the two steam locomotives would be retired and replaced by two new diesel locomotives. The steam locomotives were sold to the Riverside and Great Northern Railway. The first new diesel locomotive, #2025, entered service in September 2025.

=== Child friendly areas ===
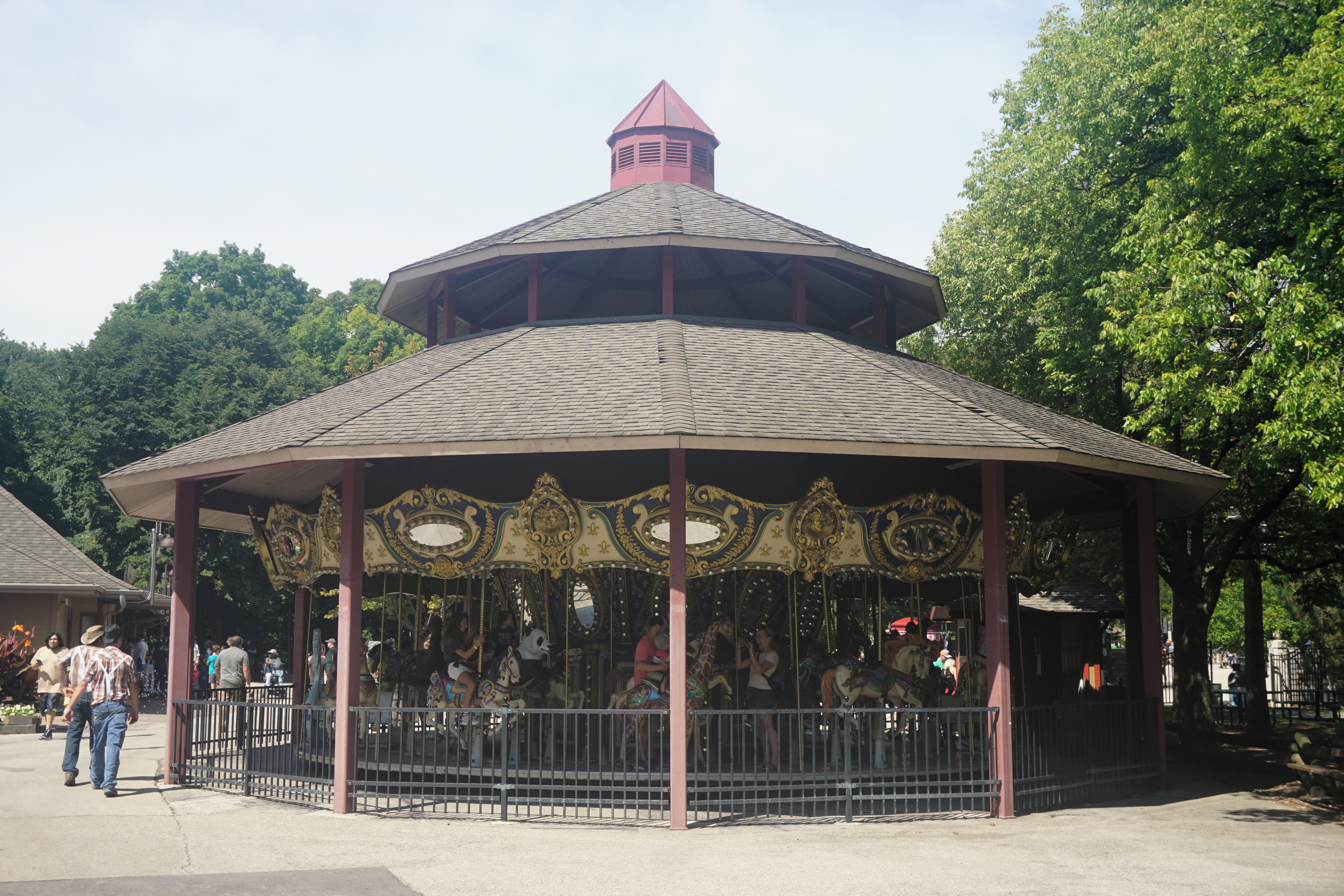
Penzeys Carousel

- Playground
- Treehouse area
- Dinosaur exhibit (seasonal)
- Sky Trail Ropes Courses & Zip Line
- Ski Safari
- Zoo Mobile
- Penzeys Carousel

== Gallery ==
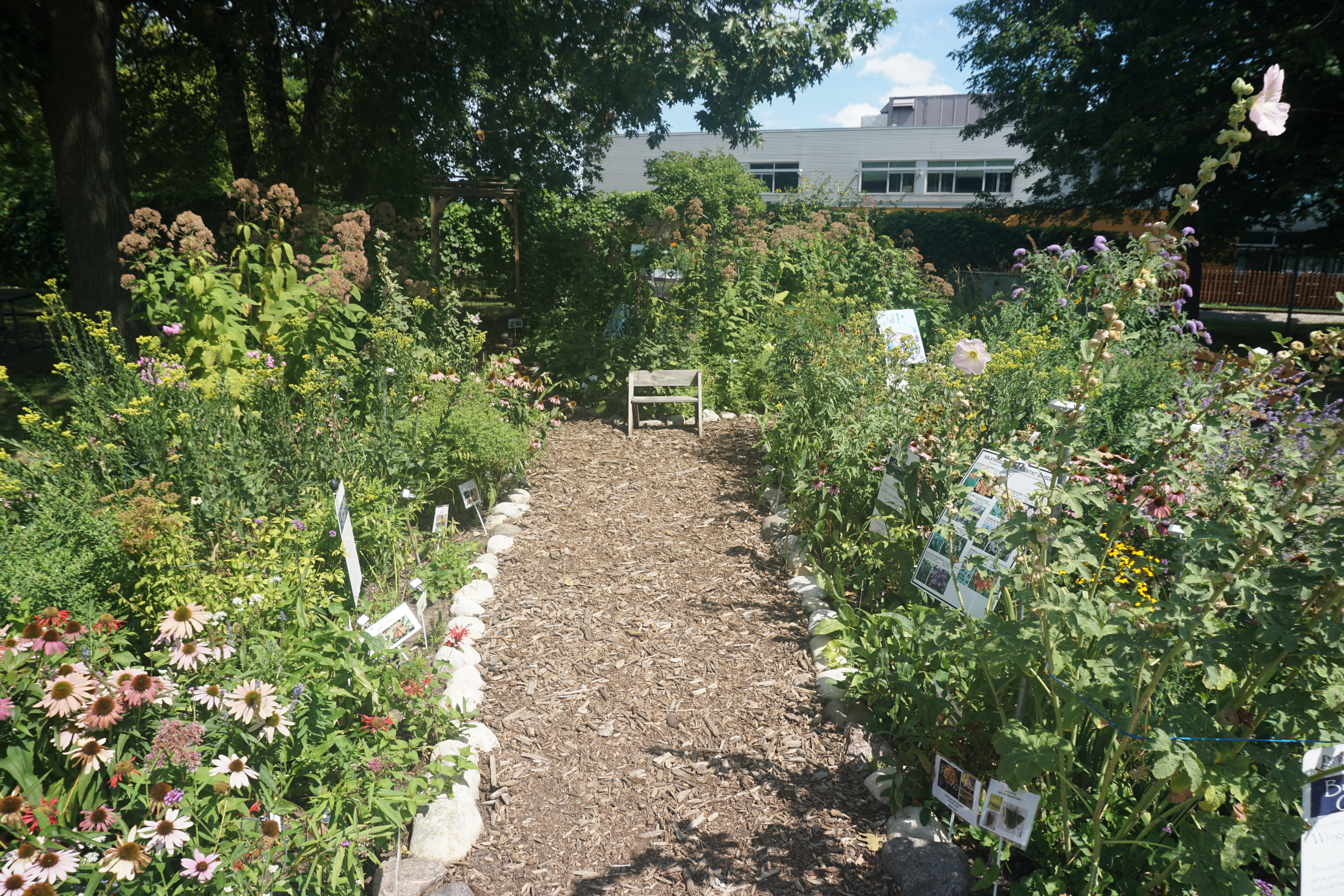
Butterfly Garden

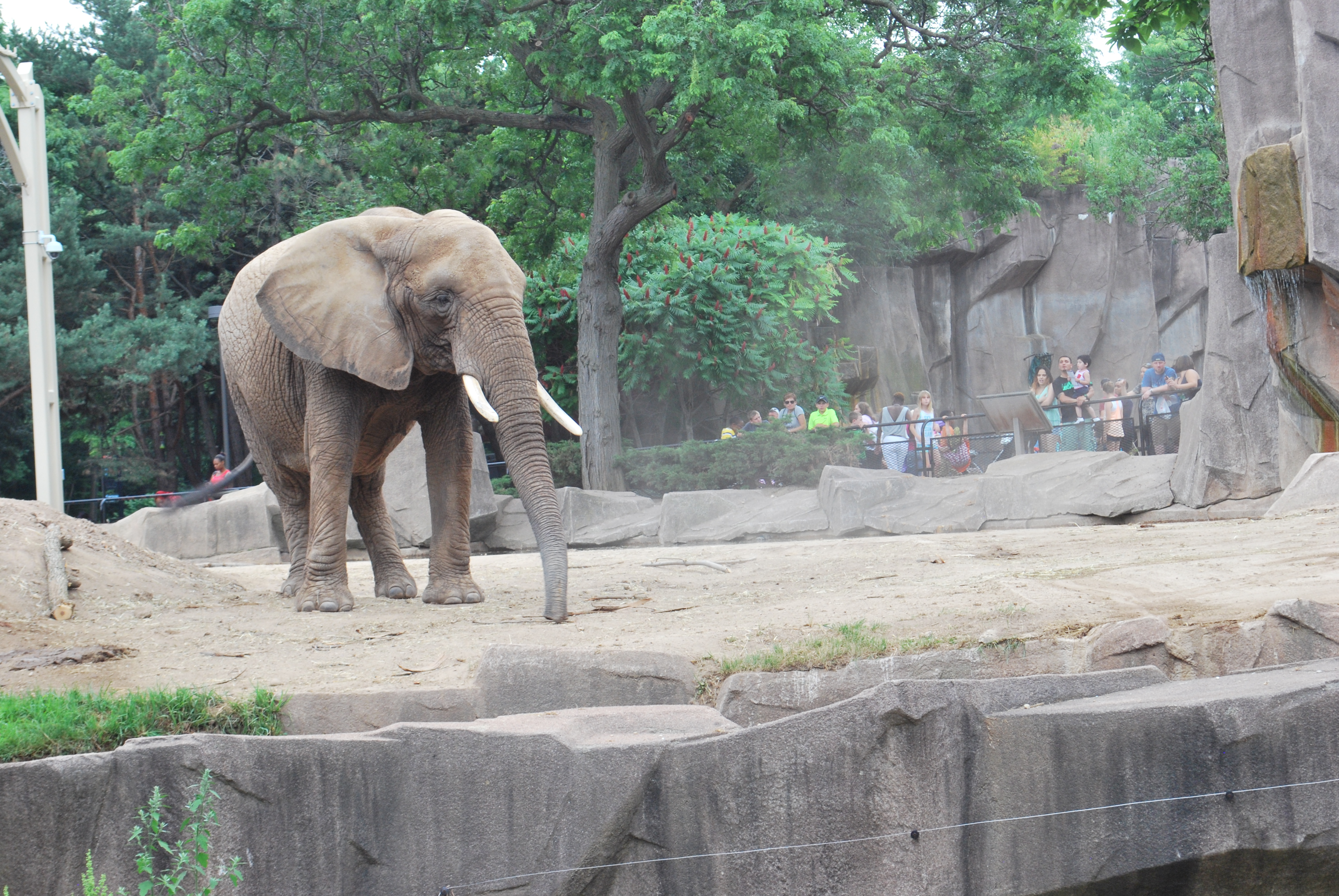
African elephant (Loxodonta)

Giraffes at the zoo

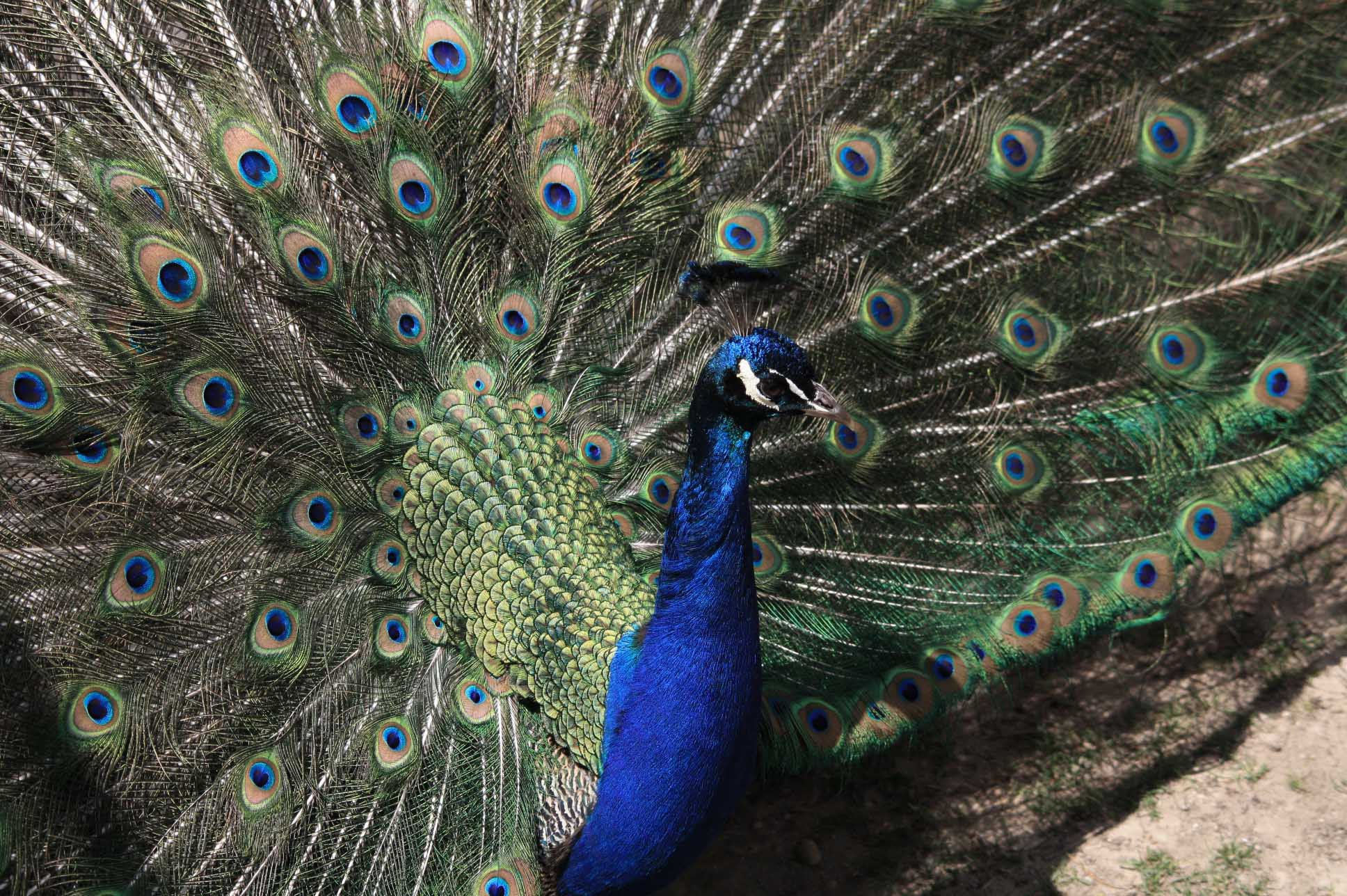
Peacock

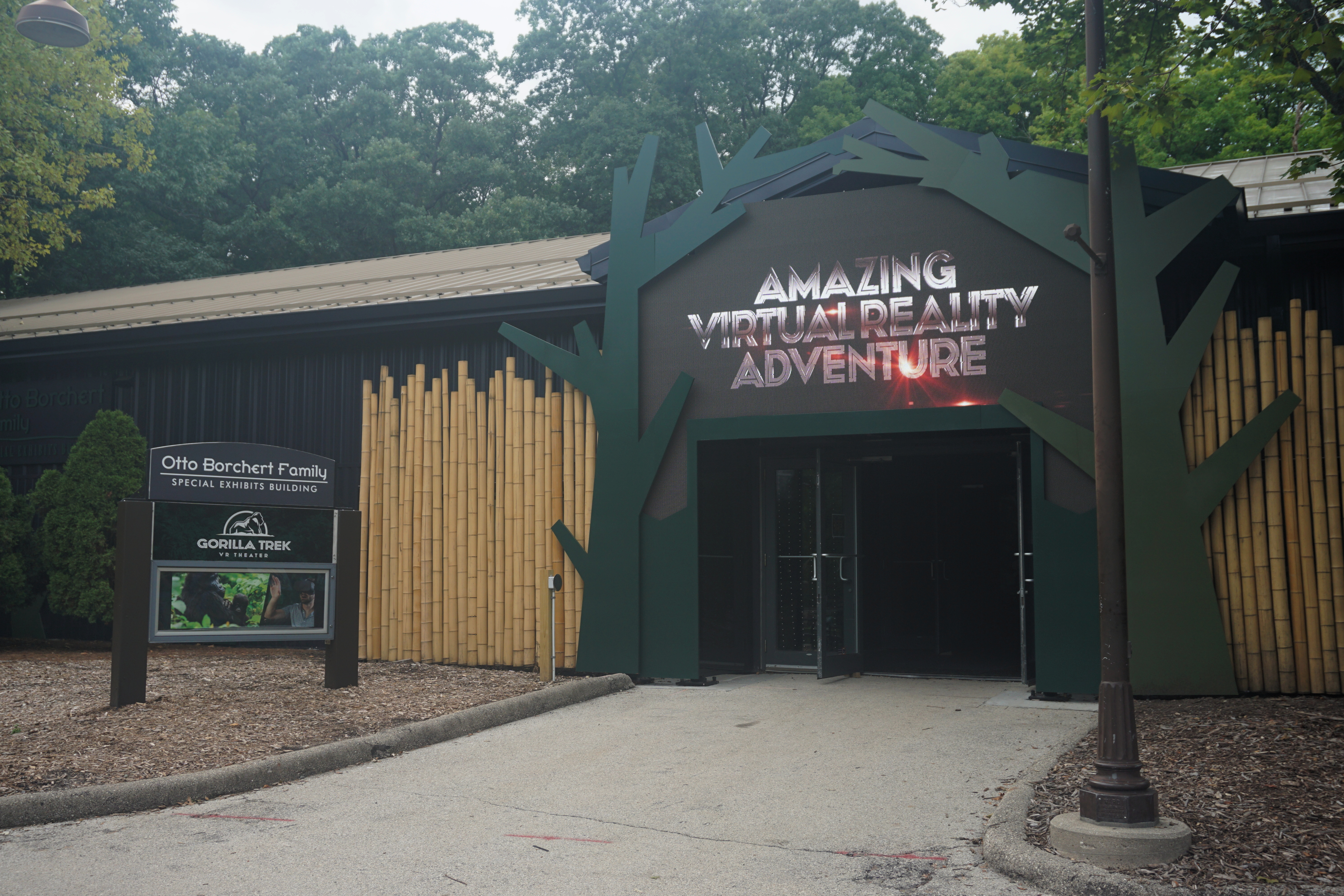
Otto Borchert Family Special Exhibits Building

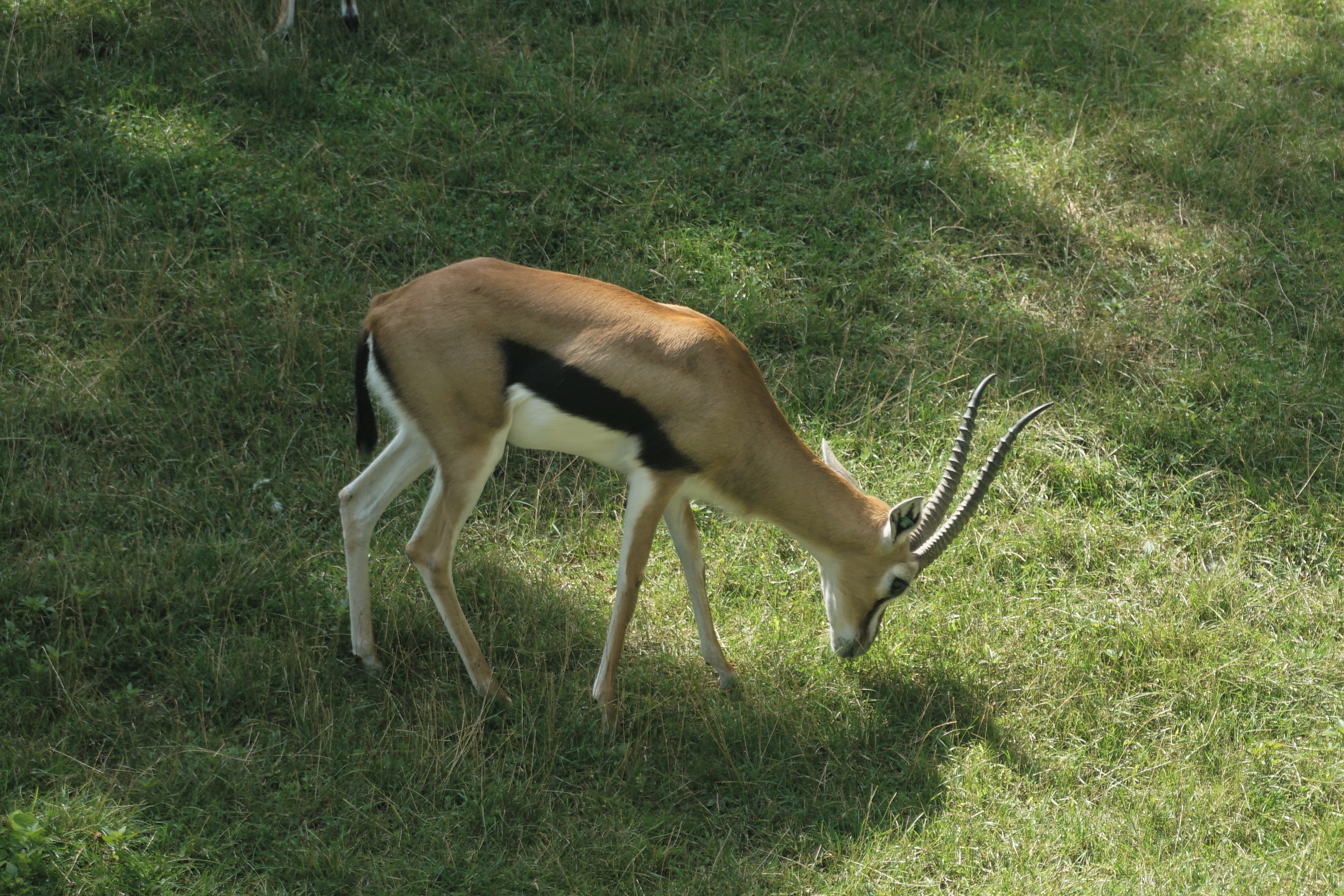
Thomson's gazelle

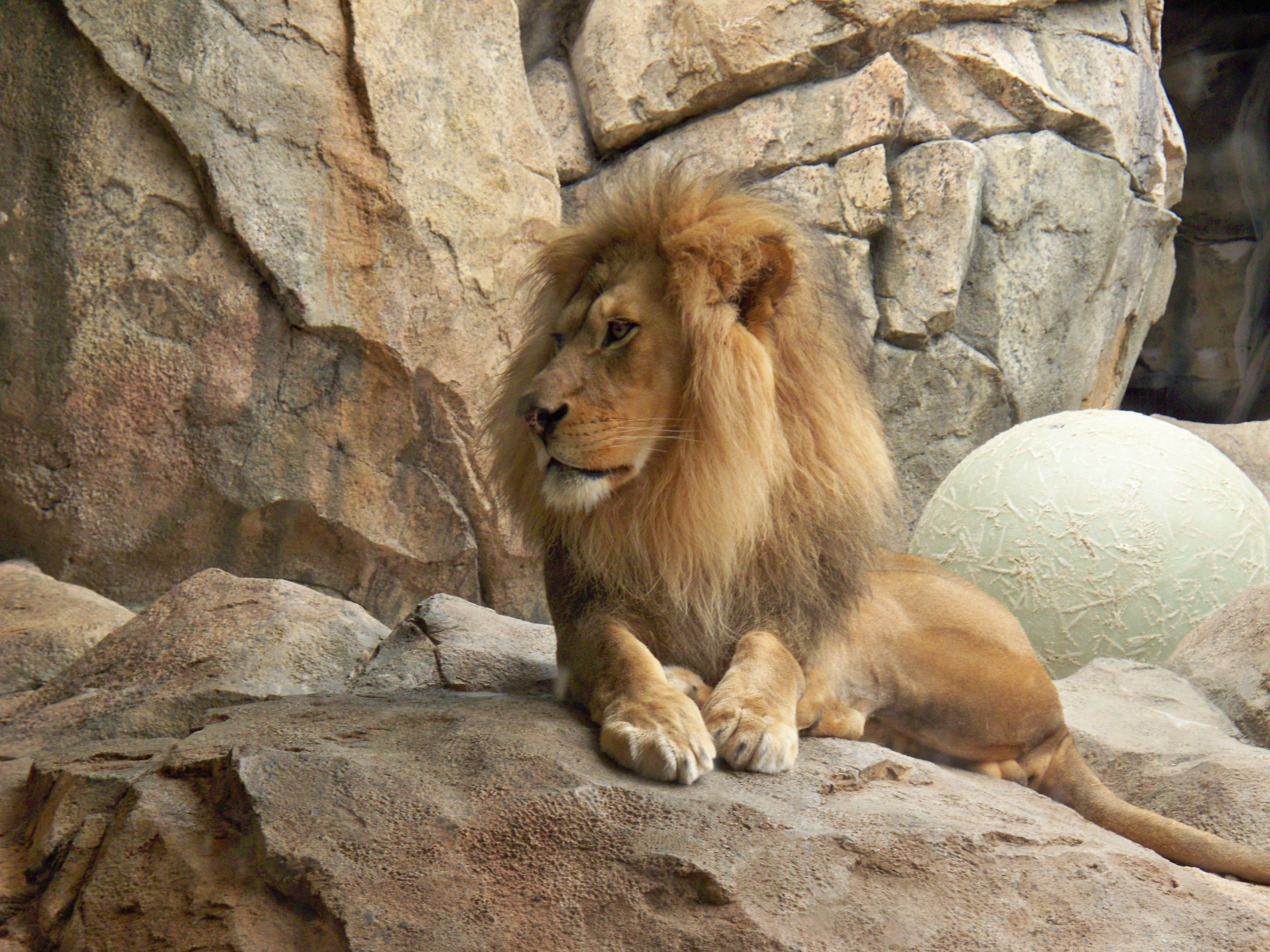
Lion

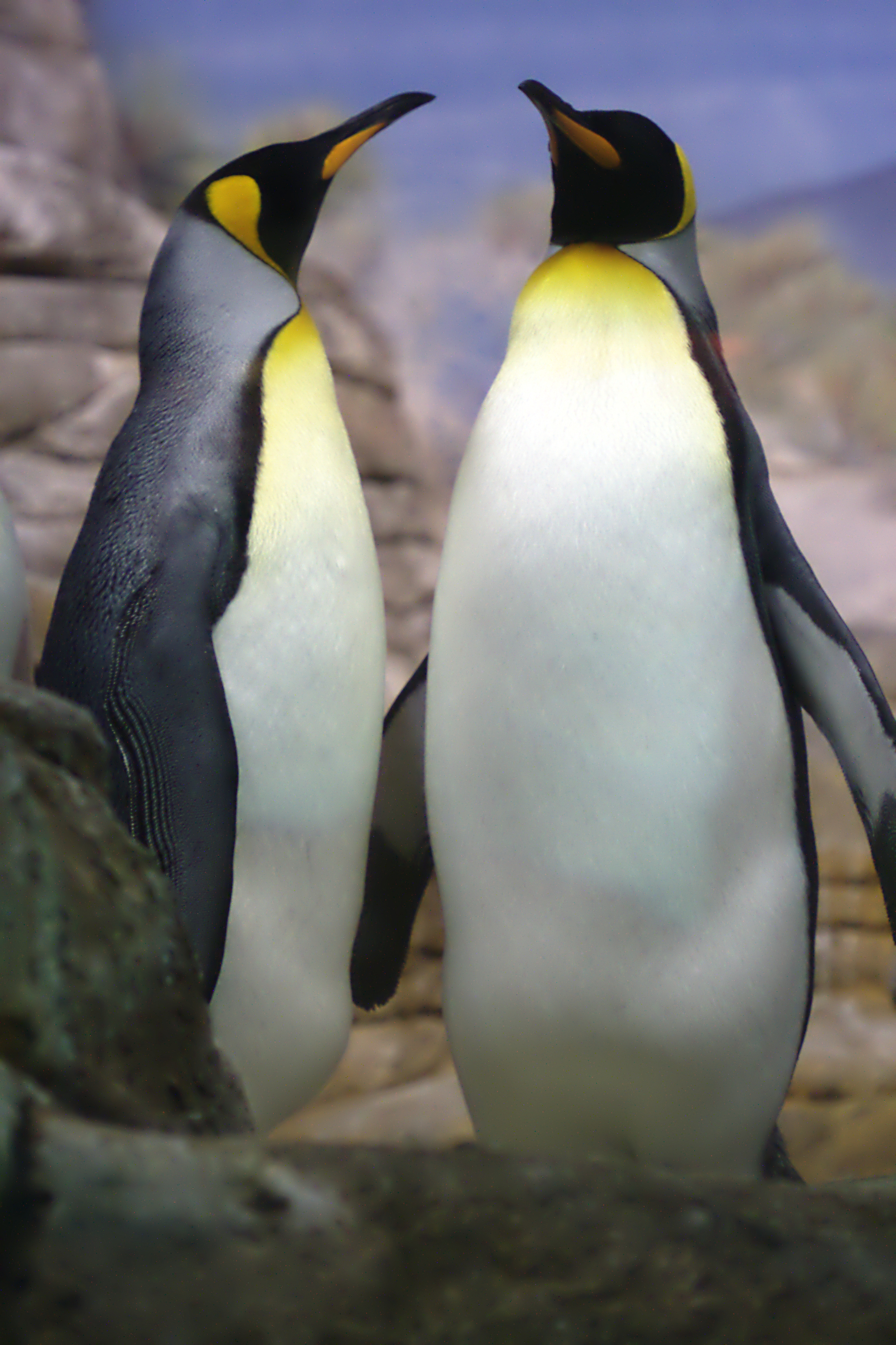
King penguin (Aptenodytes patagonicus)

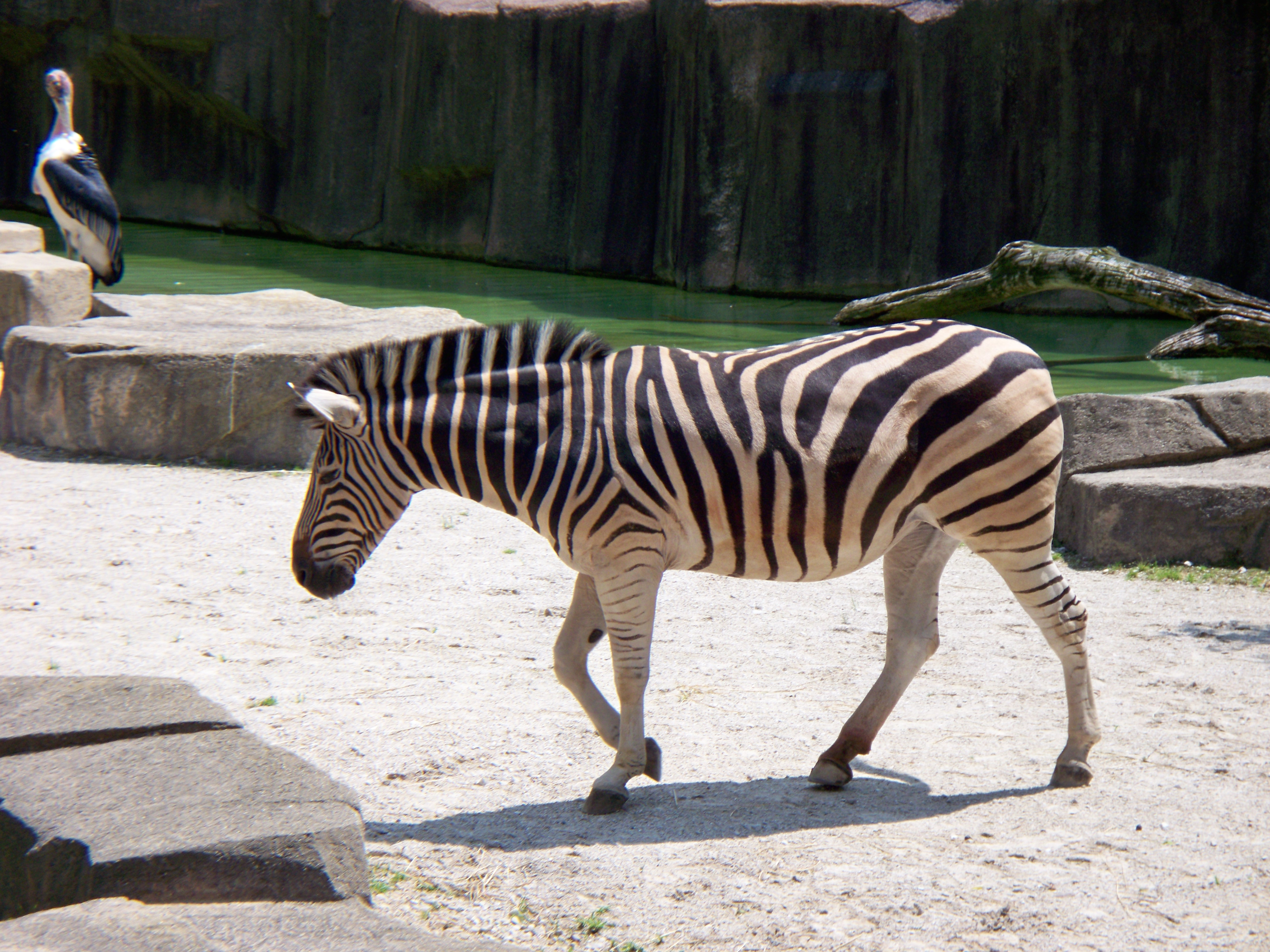
Zebra

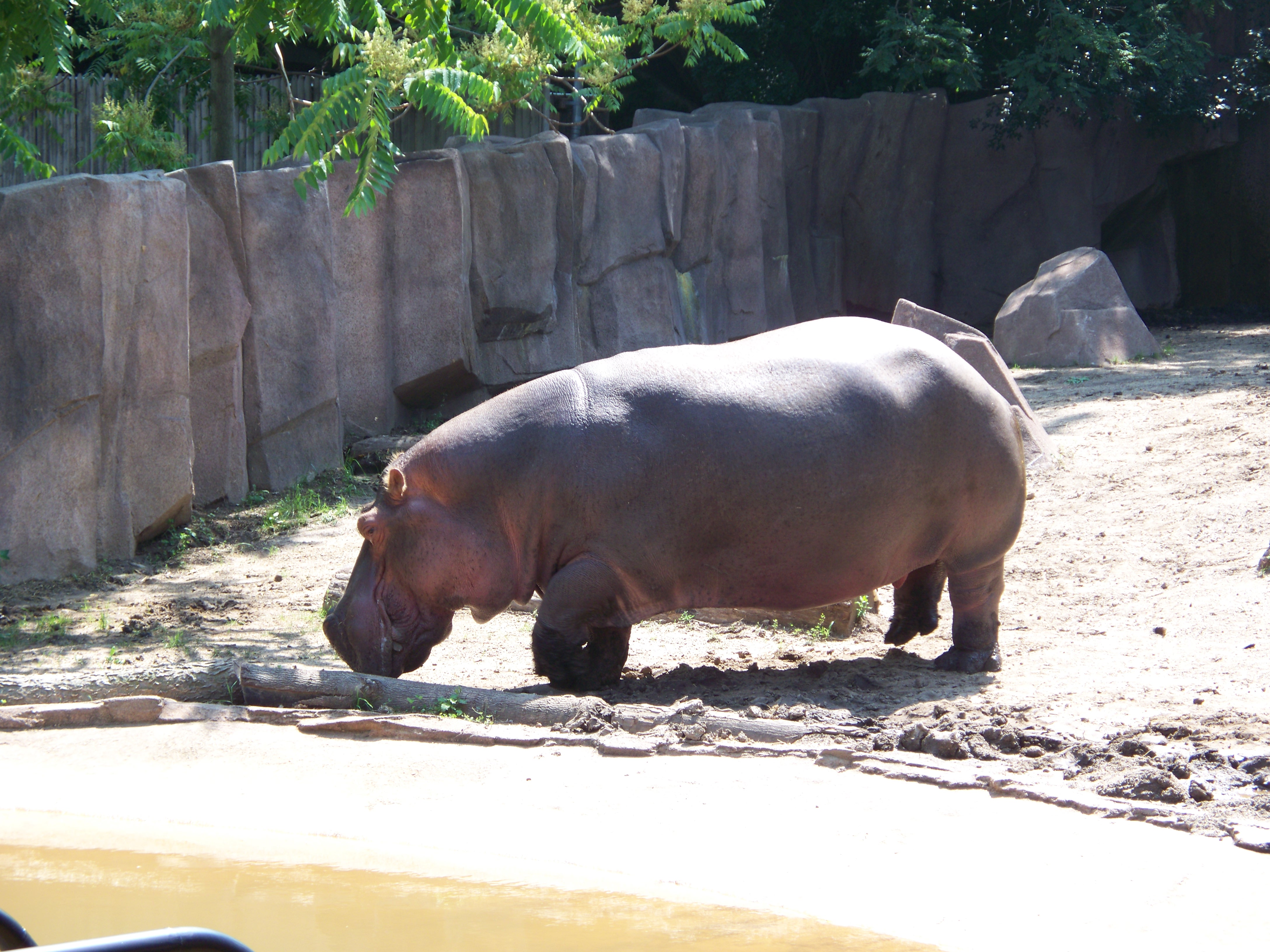
Hippo

== Bibliography ==
- "Fort Worth Zoo One of Only 7 U.S. Institutions to Earn Humane Certification". Global Newsbytes. April 18, 2017.
