= Del Rosa, San Bernardino, California =

- Neighborhood community
- Location of Del Rosa in California
- Coordinates: 34°08′48″N 117°14′37″W
- Country: United States
- State: California
- City: San Bernardino
- Elevation: 1,291 ft (393 m)
- Time zone: UTC-8 (PST)
  - Summer (DST): UTC-7 (PDT)

Del Rosa (corruption of de la Rosa, Spanish for "of the Rose") is a neighborhood community in the city of San Bernardino, California.

== History ==
Del Rosa is derived from a Spanish phrase meaning "of the rose".

== Geography ==
Del Rosa is located 5.4 miles northeast of downtown San Bernardino in San Bernardino County, California. The coordinates are 34.853N, -117.13W, and the elevation is 1,321 feet, and it is in the Pacific Time Zone (UTC-8, UTC-7 in the summer).

=== Climate ===
Del Rosa has a hot-summer Mediterranean climate. It experiences mild winters and hot, dry summers.
