= Riverside and Great Northern Railway =

Heritage railroad in Wisconsin, United States

Coordinates: 43°38′30.6″N 89°47′25.6″W

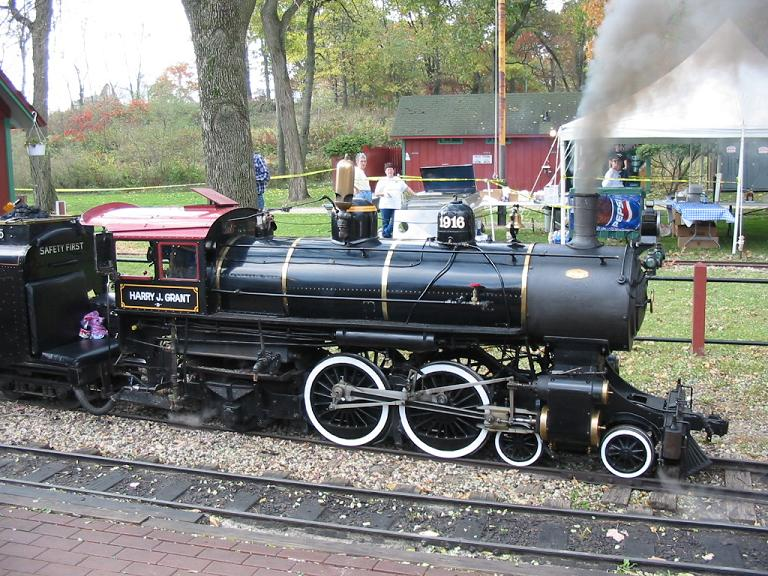
4-4-2 1916 Harry J. Grant waiting for passengers at the station, October 11, 2003.

The Riverside and Great Northern Railway (R&GN) is a 15 in (381 mm) gauge miniature railway and heritage railroad in Wisconsin Dells. The railway is operated by the Riverside and Great Northern Preservation Society and includes the former shops of the Sandley Light Railway Equipment Works, a miniature train manufacturing business of the father and son team Elmer and Norman Sandley.

== History ==
The railway was started in Janesville, Wisconsin, as a demonstration railway for Sandley locomotives and rolling stock. In 1952 the Sandleys relocated to the former right-of-way of the La Crosse and Milwaukee Railroad near Wisconsin Dells, which was abandoned in favor of a route with a smoother grade 500 feet (152 m) to the south.

The Sandleys built their shops, a replica and C&NW depot (scaled down), and a railway to demonstrate their products. The railway and workshops attracted visitors from around the world. They built about 15 locomotives and over 30 pieces of rolling stock. Trains that once ran at the Brookfield Zoo in Chicago and the Knoxville Zoo were built at the Wisconsin Dells facilities. The Sandleys also built the entire railway currently still in use at the Milwaukee Zoo as well.

In the early 1980s, new locomotive and rolling stock orders dropped off, forcing Norman Sandley into bankruptcy. 1980 was the last season for train operations on the R&GN under Sandley management. In the late 1980s a group of enthusiasts made plans to purchase the property. The R&GN Preservation Society was formed, and members began replacing ties and repairing buildings, but they still had to find a train. One of the group's members had built a diesel locomotive and this was traded to the Milwaukee County Zoo for the no. 82 steam locomotive, which had not been running because it was not powerful enough to pull the longer trains needed at the zoo's railway. The society has since acquired another steam locomotive, former Hoot-Toot & Whistle Railway number 98, from the Old Wakarusa Railroad in Indiana. Both locomotives were built at the Wisconsin Dells shops in the late 1950s, with #98 being the motive power for the Hoot-Toot & Whistle Railway near Elgin, Illinois. In 2024, the two remaining steam locomotives from the Milwaukee County Zoo were sold to the R&GN.

The railroad includes an operational joinery building where coaches are restored and maintained, a picnic area, and a gift shop.
