= Delavan (town), Wisconsin =

Town of Delavan, Wisconsin
- Town
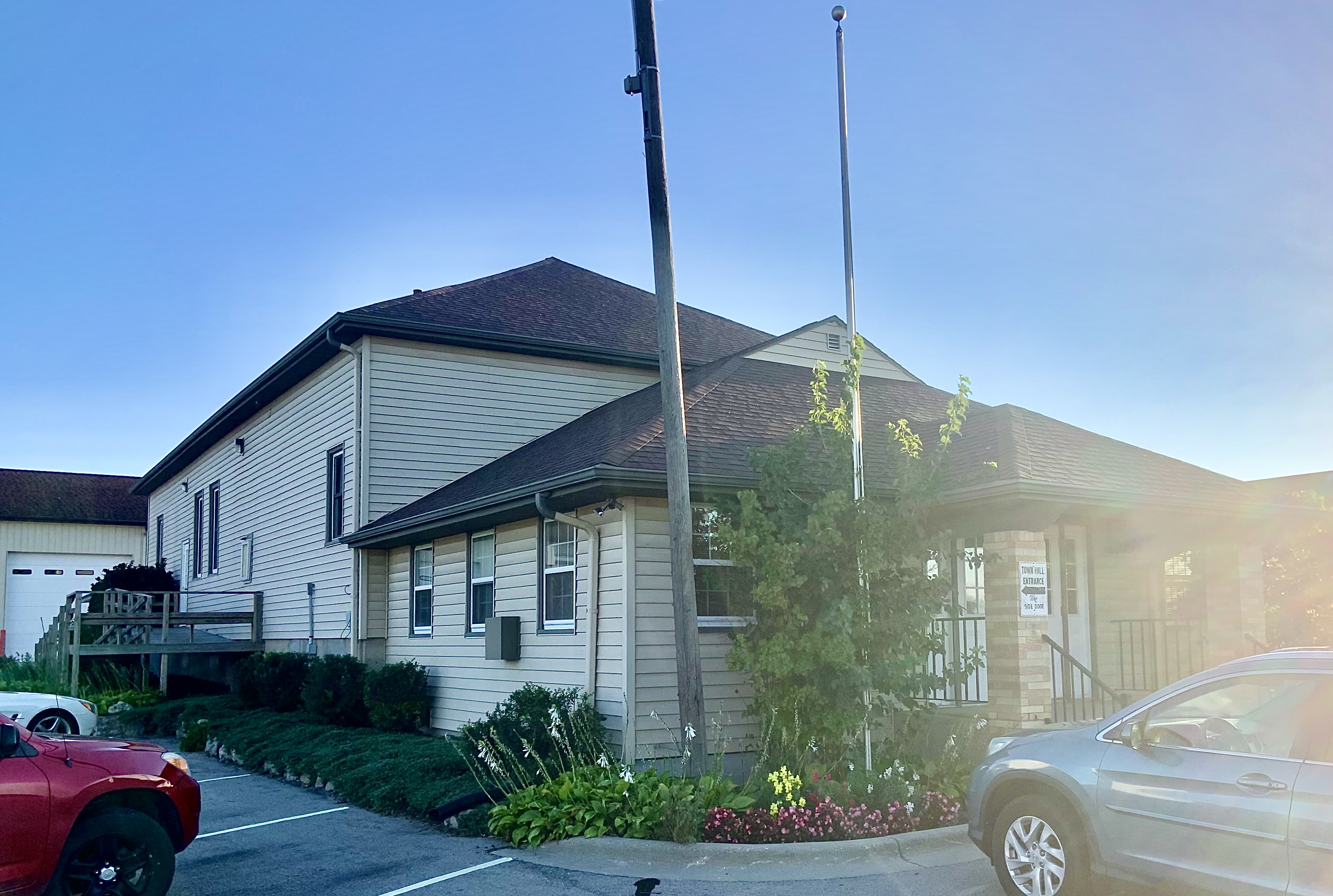
- Town hall

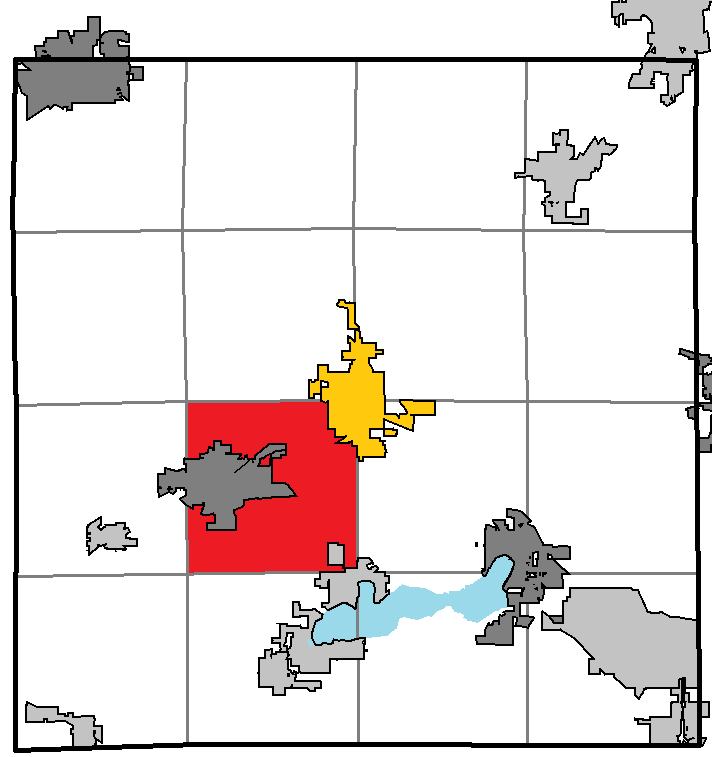
- Location of Delavan, within Walworth County

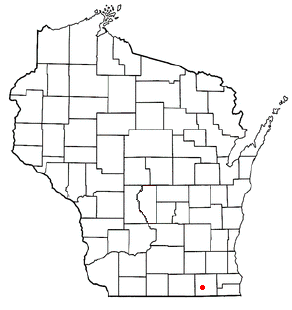
- Location of the Town of Delavan, Wisconsin
- Coordinates: 42°36′51″N 88°36′25″W
- Country: United States
- State: Wisconsin
- County: Walworth

Area
  - Total: 28.1 sq mi (72.9 km^{2})
  - Land: 25.3 sq mi (65.6 km^{2})
  - Water: 2.8 sq mi (7.3 km^{2})
- Elevation: 945 ft (288 m)

Population (2020)
  - Total: 5,273
  - Density: 208/sq mi (80.4/km^{2})
- Time zone: UTC-6 (Central (CST))
  - Summer (DST): UTC-5 (CDT)
- Area code: 262
- FIPS code: 55-19475
- GNIS feature ID: 1583069

Delavan is a town in Walworth County, Wisconsin, United States. The unincorporated communities of East Delavan, Inlet, and Lake Lawn are located in the town as well as parts of the City of Delavan and the Census-designated place of Delavan Lake. The population was 5,273 at the 2020 census.

== Geography ==
According to the United States Census Bureau, the town has a total area of 28.1 square miles (72.9 km^{2}), of which 25.3 square miles (65.6 km^{2}) is land and 2.8 square miles (7.3 km^{2}) (10.06%) is water.

== Demographics ==
As of the census of 2000, there were 4,559 people, 1,798 households, and 1,235 families residing in the town. The population density was 180.1 people per square mile (69.5/km^{2}). There were 3,054 housing units at an average density of 120.7 per square mile (46.6/km^{2}). The racial makeup of the town was 93.70% White, 0.70% Black or African American, 0.33% Native American, 0.75% Asian, 0.02% Pacific Islander, 3.51% from other races, and 0.99% from two or more races. 7.57% of the population were Hispanic or Latino of any race.

There were 1,798 households, out of which 29.6% had children under the age of 18 living with them, 58.7% were married couples living together, 6.7% had a female householder with no husband present, and 31.3% were non-families. 24.5% of all households were made up of individuals, and 8.7% had someone living alone who was 65 years of age or older. The average household size was 2.53 and the average family size was 3.04.

In the town, the population was spread out, with 24.9% under the age of 18, 6.7% from 18 to 24, 29.6% from 25 to 44, 25.2% from 45 to 64, and 13.6% who were 65 years of age or older. The median age was 38 years. For every 100 females, there were 103.5 males. For every 100 females age 18 and over, there were 100.9 males.

The median income for a household in the town was $45,264, and the median income for a family was $53,384. Males had a median income of $38,333 versus $22,353 for females. The per capita income for the town was $22,796. About 2.9% of families and 4.9% of the population were below the poverty line, including 6.7% of those under age 18 and 6.7% of those age 65 or over.

== Economics ==
Delavan is home to...
