= Desert Lake, California =

Unincorporated community in California, United States

- Unincorporated community
- Location in California Desert Lake, California (the United States)
- Coordinates: 35°00′09″N 117°41′56″W
- Country: United States
- State: California
- County: Kern
- Elevation: 2,402 ft (732 m)

Desert Lake is an unincorporated community in Kern County, California, United States.

It is located 2.5 miles (4 km) west of Boron, at an elevation of 2402 feet (732 m). Desert Lake's ZIP code is 93516.
