= Delevan, California =

Unincorporated community in California, United States

Delevan
- Unincorporated community
- Location in California Delevan (the United States)
- Coordinates: 39°21′15″N 122°11′28″W
- Country: United States
- State: California
- County: Colusa
- Elevation: 92 ft (28 m)

Population (2016)
  - Total: 70

Delevan (formerly, Delavan and Del Evan) is an unincorporated community in Colusa County, California, United States, 3.5 miles (5.6 km) south of Norman and 5 miles (8.0 km) north of Maxwell. It lies at an elevation of 92 feet (28 m). A post office was established at Delevan in 1902, closed in 1917, and reopened in 1922. As of 2016, Delevan had a population of 70.
