= James Lauderdale (politician) =

American politician

James Lauderdale was a member of the Wisconsin State Assembly.

== Biography ==
Lauderdale was born on August 29, 1813, in Cambridge, New York. In 1842, he moved to what is now La Grange, Walworth County, Wisconsin. He died there on March 13, 1888. Lake Lauderdale in his hometown of Cambridge, New York, and Lauderdale, Wisconsin, are named after him.

== Career ==
Lauderdale was a member of the Assembly in 1853 and 1856. Additionally, he was a member of the Walworth County, Wisconsin, county board.
