= Frank L. Fraser =

American politician

Frank L. Fraser (September 29, 1854 – July 29, 1935) was an American lawyer and politician.

Born in Sacramento, California, Fraser moved to Wisconsin in 1860 and grew up in the town of East Troy, Walworth County, Wisconsin. He went to the Rochester Academy and the Whitewater Normal School. Fraser studied law in Racine, Wisconsin and was admitted to the Wisconsin bar in 1876. Fraser lived in Lake Beulah, Wisconsin and was also a farmer. He served on the Walworth County Board of Supervisors and was chairman of the East Troy Town Board. Fraser also served on the school board and was the board treasurer. Fraser was the postmaster for Lake Beulah. In 1895, Fraser served in the Wisconsin State Assembly and was a Republican. Fraser died at his home in East Troy, Wisconsin.
