= La Grange, Wisconsin =

La Grange is the name of some places in the U.S. state of Wisconsin:

- La Grange, Monroe County, Wisconsin, a town
- La Grange, Walworth County, Wisconsin, a town
  - La Grange (community), Wisconsin, an unincorporated community in Walworth County, Wisconsin
