= Maxine Hough =

American politician

Maxine Hough (born January 7, 1942) is an American educator and politician.

Born in East Troy, Wisconsin, Hough received her bachelor's degree from University of Wisconsin–Madison and her bachelor's degree in education from University of Wisconsin–Whitewater. Hough was an elementary school teacher and administrator. She was also a Wisconsin Senate legislative assistant. She served on the Walworth County, Wisconsin Board of Supervisors from 1988 to 1991. Hough then served in the Wisconsin State Assembly in 1991 as a Democrat. She served on the state governing board of Common Cause in Wisconsin, the state's largest non-partisan political reform advocacy organization, from 1996 to 2013, including as Co-Chair from 2005 to 2013.
