= Lauderdale Lakes =

Lauderdale Lakes may refer to:

- Lauderdale Lakes, Florida, a city in Broward County, Florida, United States
- Lauderdale Lakes, Wisconsin, a census-designated place in La Grange, Walworth County, Wisconsin, United States
