= Everett E. Dow =

American politician

Everett Edward Dow (July 7, 1853 – September 23, 1929) was a member of the Wisconsin State Assembly during the 1901 session. A native of La Grange, Wisconsin, Dow represented the 1st District of Walworth County, Wisconsin. Dow was a Republican.

He died in 1929 after a short illness, survived by two daughters and four sons.
