= Lake Beulah, Wisconsin =

- Unincorporated community
- Location within Wisconsin Location within the United States
- Coordinates: 42°49′17″N 88°19′15″W
- Country: United States
- State: Wisconsin
- County: Walworth
- Elevation: 830 ft (250 m)
- Time zone: UTC-6 (Central (CST))
  - Summer (DST): UTC-5 (CDT)
- Area code: 262
- GNIS feature ID: 1567724

Lake Beulah is an unincorporated community in the town of East Troy, Walworth County, Wisconsin, United States. The unincorporated community surrounds the freshwater Lake Beulah.

== Lake Beulah ==
=== Community ===
The unincorporated community surrounds the freshwater Lake Beulah. The lake covers an area of 812 acres with a maximum depth of 58 feet.

Two summer camps, YMCA Camp Edwards and Beber Camp, also use the lake for recreational purposes.

=== Ecology ===
Lake Beulah contains a variety of different species within the lake. Many species of fish can be found in the lake, including: Panfish, Largemouth Bass, Smallmouth Bass, Northern Pike, Walleyes, Redbreast Sunfish, Catfish, Crappie, Bluegill, and Cisco.

The lake is also home to Painted Turtles, Smooth Softshell Turtles, and Snapping Turtles.

Curly-Leaf Pondweed, Eurasian Water-Milfoil, Hybrid Eurasian / Northern Water-Milfoil, and Zebra Mussels can also be found in the lake.

Wood ducks and Canada geese are also present on Lake Beulah.

=== History ===
==== Early history ====
The lake was formed at some point in the 1830s following the construction of the wooden Yonman-Johnson dam (which now forms part of Wisconsin County Highway J), creating a lake between East Troy and Mukwonago.

In 1894, the Lake Beulah Protective and Improvement Association (LBPIA) was established with the aim of "improving and protecting Lake Beulah and the streams and waters adjacent thereto."

By 1904, the association had improved the lake strengthening the dam, introducing wall eyed pike, and formulating regulations regarding the display of lights on watercraft.

The association successfully managed to get the dam further strengthened with cement in 1909, which allowed for the lake to be maintained at a set height all year round.

A weed cutter was then purchased by LBPIA and led to the removal of weeds and tree stumps which had previously clogged some channels surrounding the lake.

==== Post World War Two ====
The end of the Second World War brought with it the advent of the commercial speedboat. Such crafts became a common occurrence on the lake and led to the issuance of a revised 'Code of Good Conduct' in 1963 which was issued to all lake front property owners.

By the 1990s, the major issue on the lake was the spread of invasive species, particularly the Eurasian Water Milfoil.

==== Lake Beulah Yacht Club ====
The Lake Beulah Yacht Club was established in 1893. Its members have been nationally recognized in sailboat racing, winning prestigious awards. The Rolex Yachtswoman of the Year Award was presented to Stephanie Roble and Annie Haeger in 2015 and 2016, respectively. Haeger also went on to represent the USA at the 2016 Olympics, finishing seventh in the women's 470.

== Notable people ==
- Frank L. Fraser, Wisconsin State Representative, farmer, and lawyer lived in Lake Beulah; Fraser served as the postmaster for Lake Beulah and the chairman of the East Troy Town Board.
- Annie Haeger, US Olympic sailor; participated in sailing competitions and other sailing activities with the Lake Beulah Yacht Club.
- Stephanie Roble, US Olympic sailor; participated in sailing competitions and other sailing activities with the Lake Beulah Yacht Club.
