= La Grange (community), Wisconsin =

La Grange, Wisconsin
- Unincorporated community
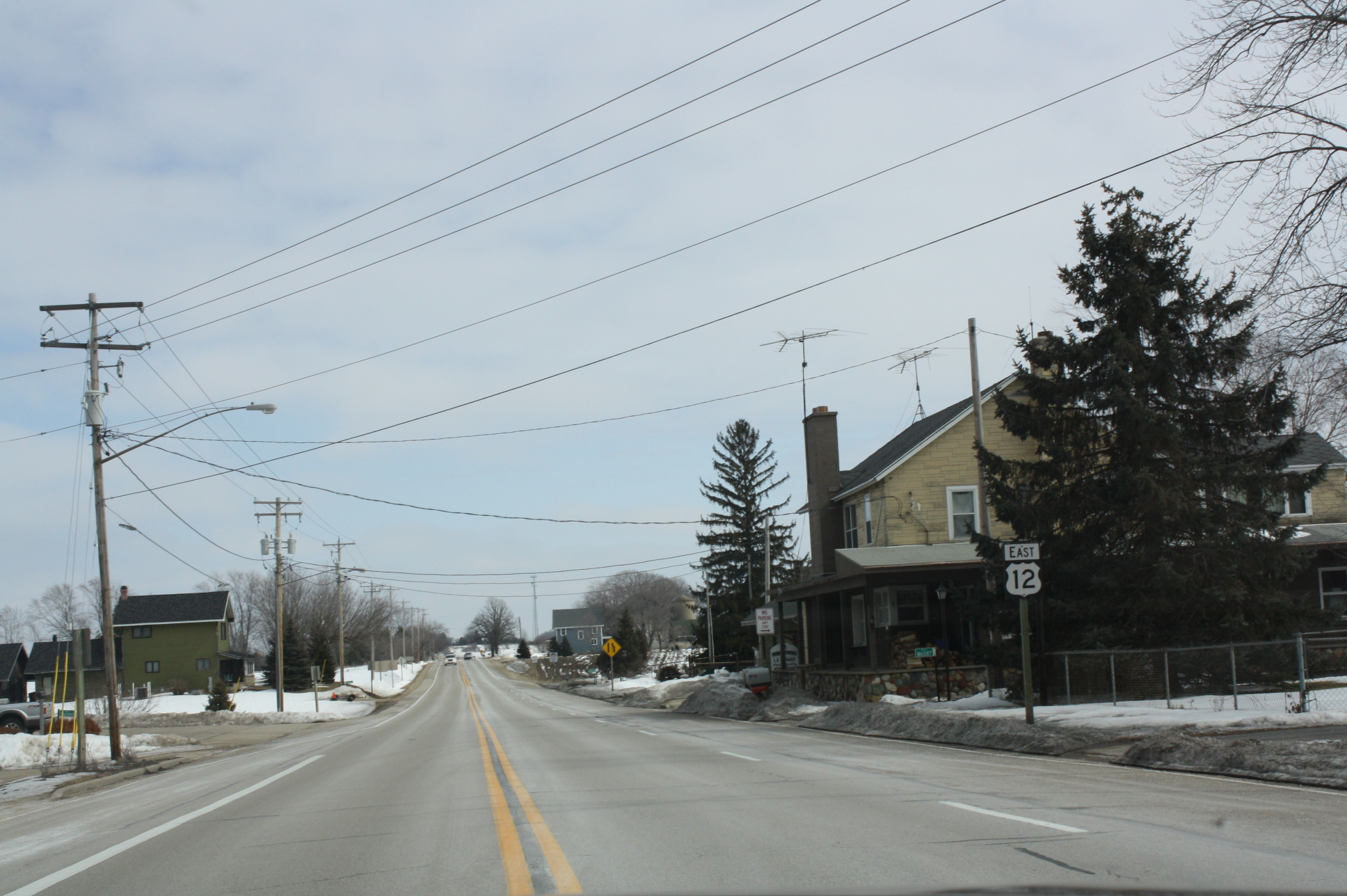
- Looking east at downtown La Grange on U.S. Route 12

- Location within Wisconsin Location within the United States
- Coordinates: 42°47′59″N 88°36′08″W
- Country: United States
- State: Wisconsin
- County: Walworth
- Elevation: 938 ft (286 m)
- Time zone: UTC-6 (Central (CST))
  - Summer (DST): UTC-5 (CDT)
- Area code: 262
- GNIS feature ID: 1567678

La Grange is an unincorporated community located in the town of La Grange, Walworth County, Wisconsin, United States. La Grange is located on U.S. Route 12. The community was named after the manor of Marquis de la Fayette. "La Grange" is French for "the barn."

== Images ==
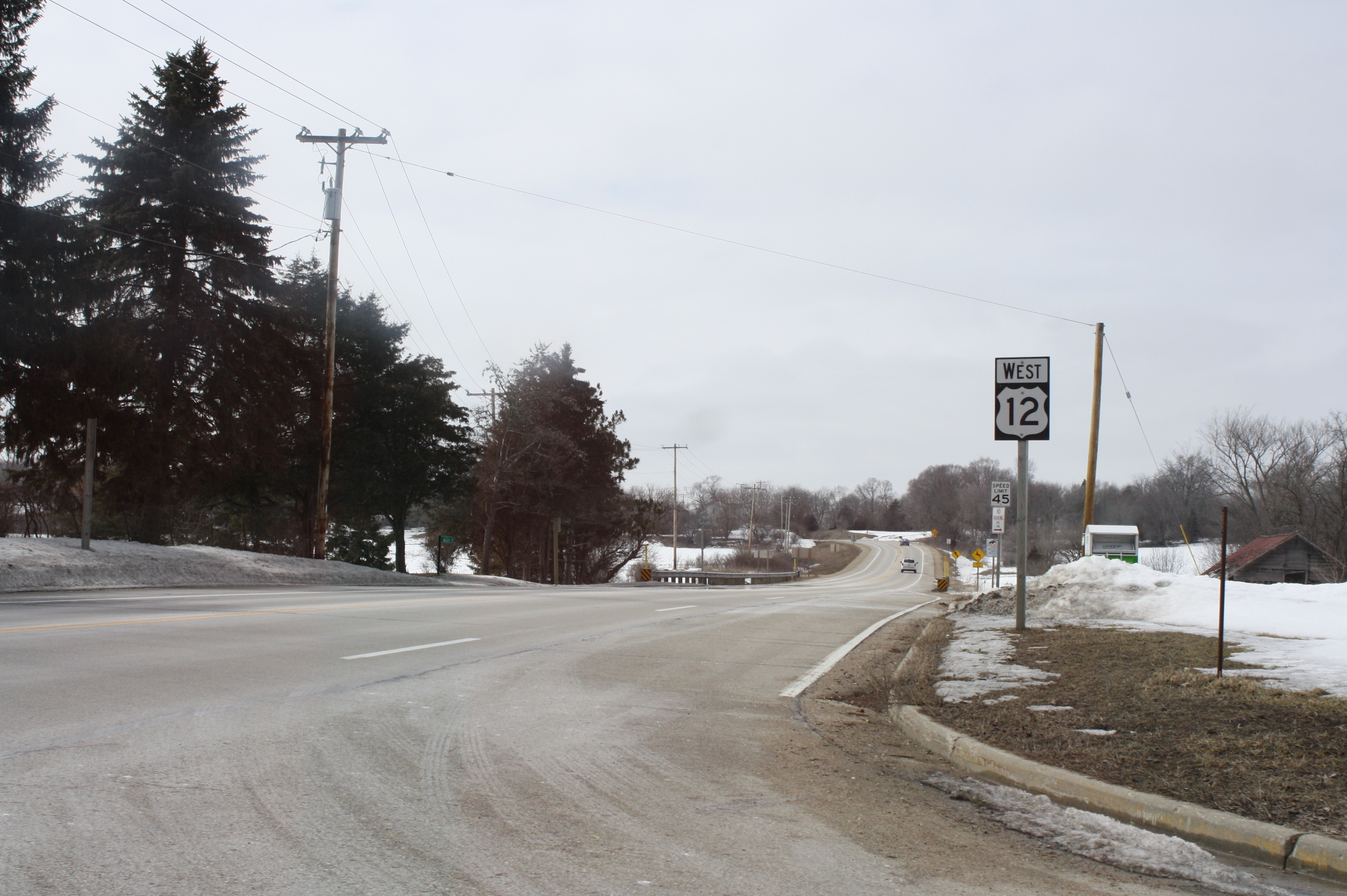
Looking west on US12

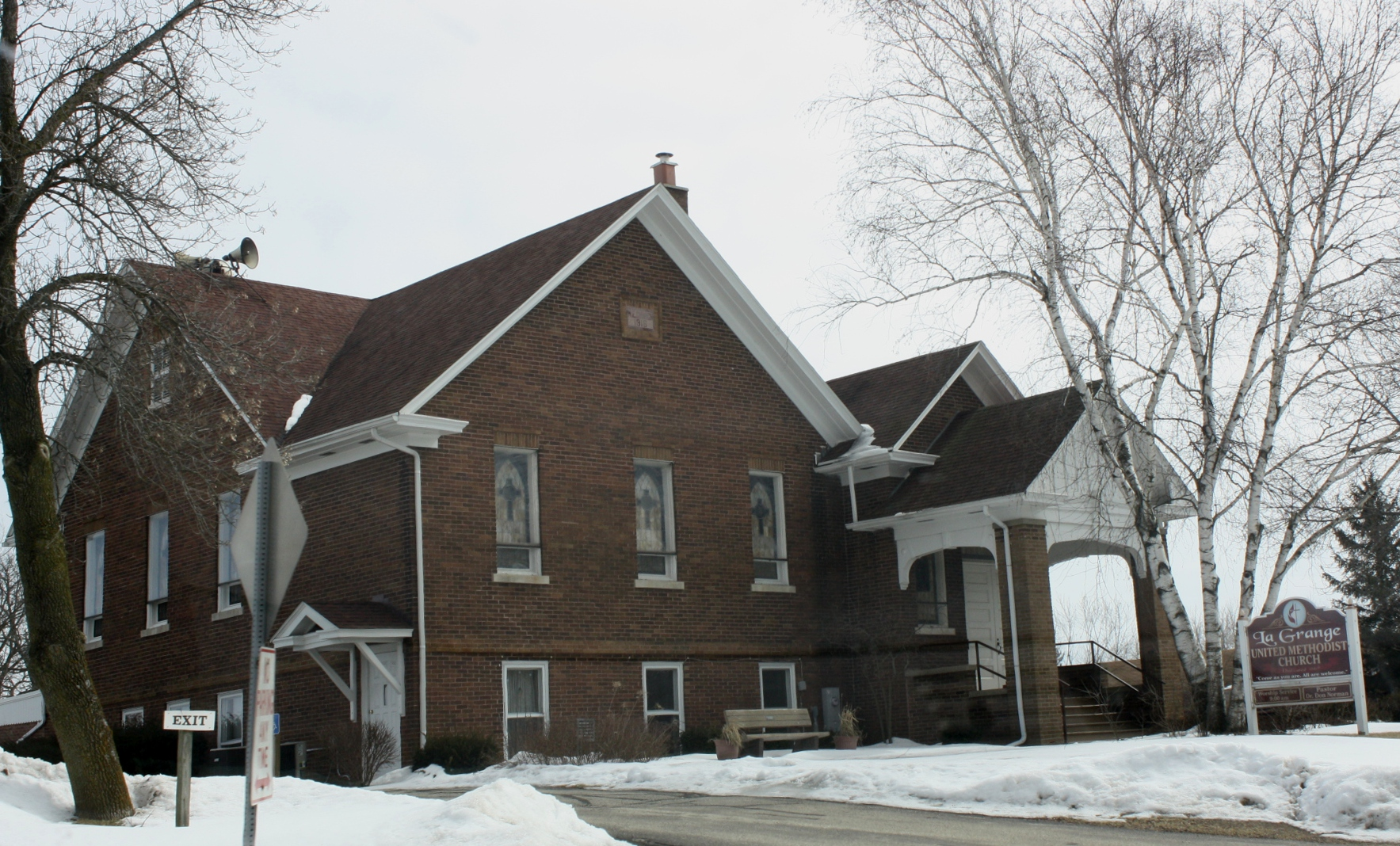
La Grange Methodist Church

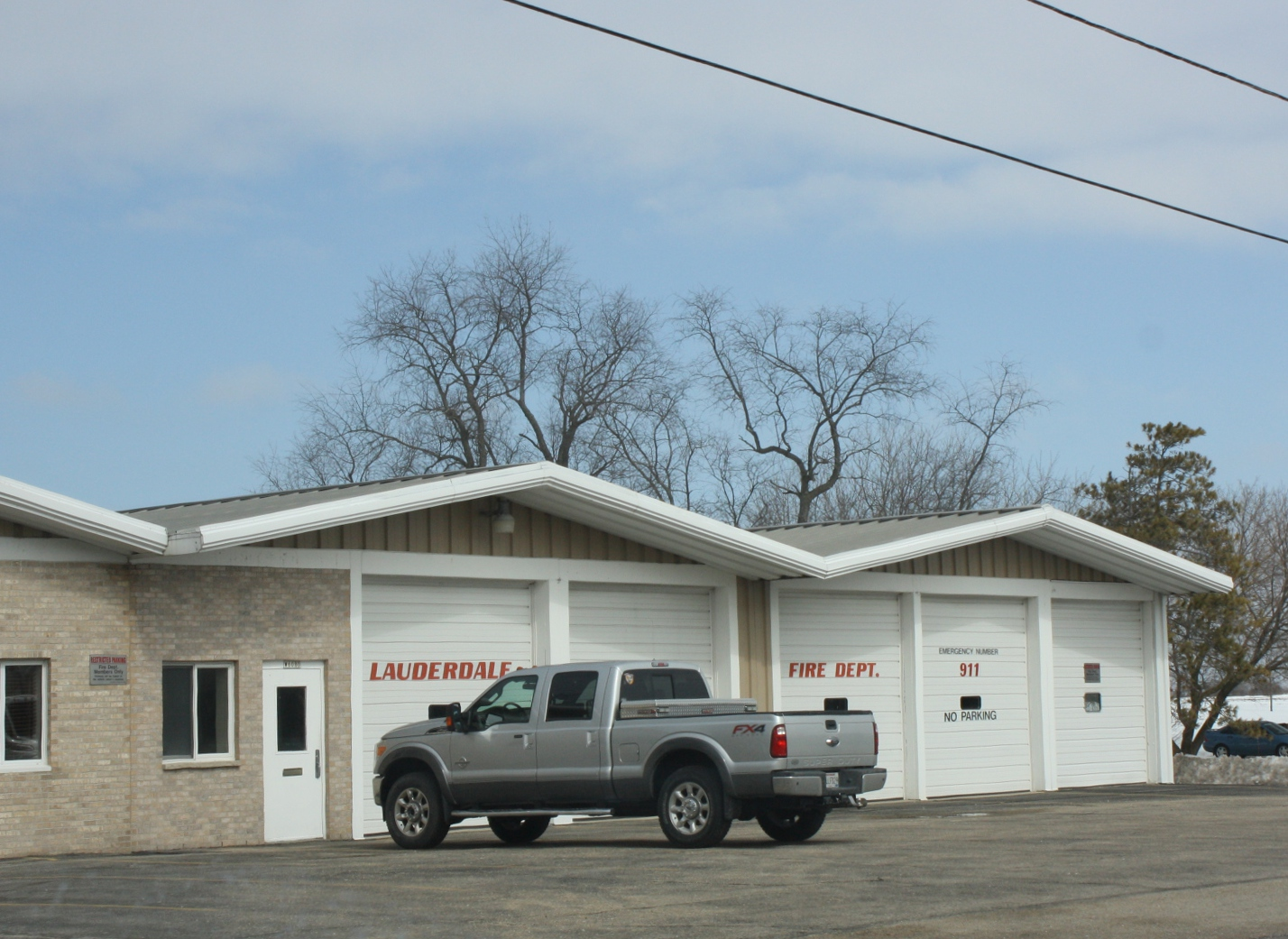
Lauderdale / La Grange Fire Department

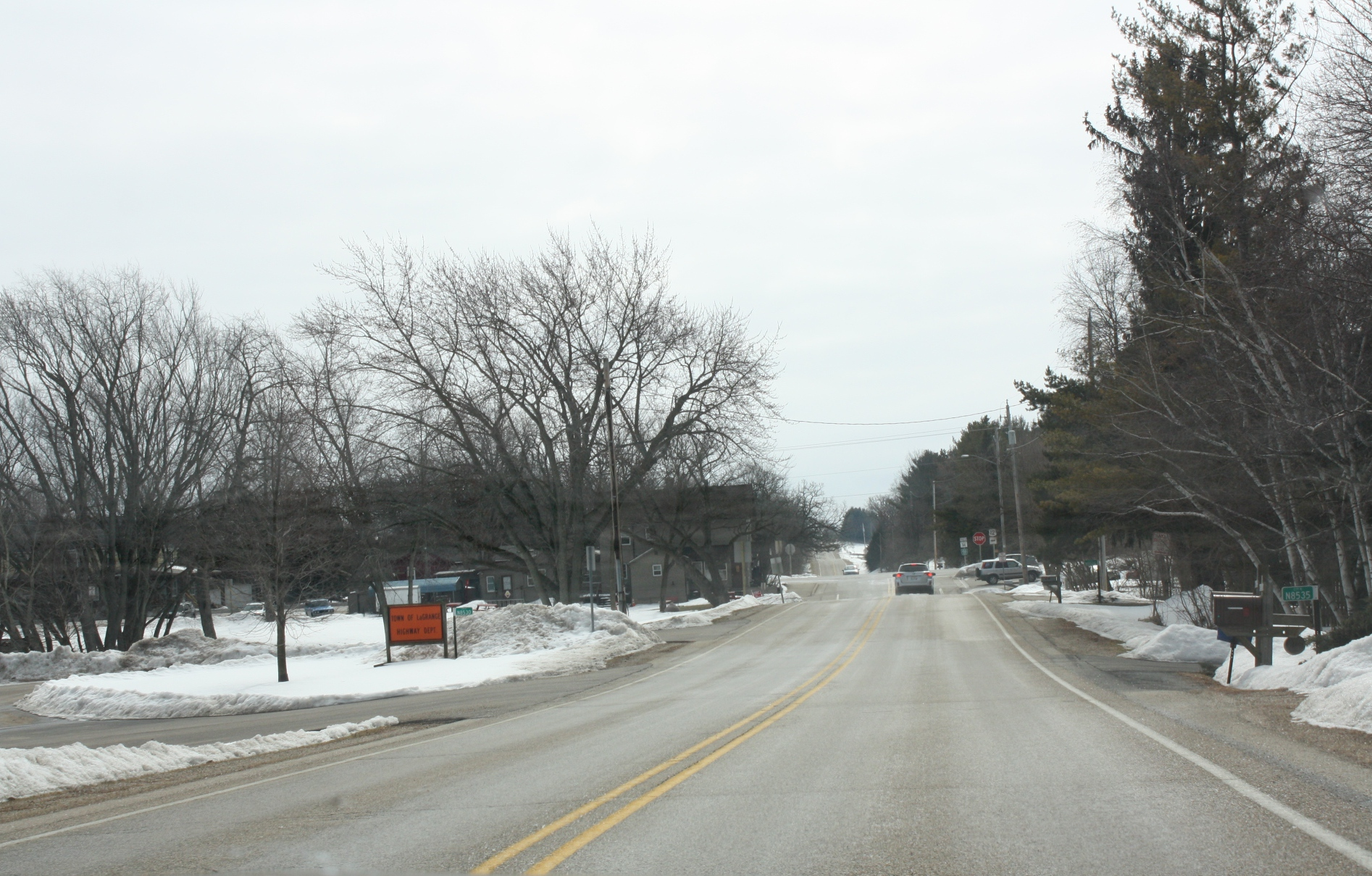
Looking south on County H
