= Potter Lake, Wisconsin =

Census-designated place in Wisconsin, United States

- CDP
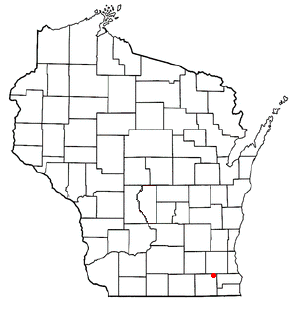
- Location of Potter Lake, Wisconsin
- Coordinates: 42°49′18″N 88°20′56″W
- Country: United States
- State: Wisconsin
- County: Walworth

Area
  - Total: 1.294 sq mi (3.35 km^{2})
  - Land: 1.052 sq mi (2.72 km^{2})
  - Water: 0.242 sq mi (0.63 km^{2})
- Elevation: 846 ft (258 m)

Population (2020)
  - Total: 1,117
  - Density: 1,062/sq mi (410.0/km^{2})
- Time zone: UTC-6 (Central (CST))
  - Summer (DST): UTC-5 (CDT)
- Area code: 262
- FIPS code: 55-64700
- GNIS feature ID: 1867664

Potter Lake is a census-designated place (CDP) in the town of East Troy, Walworth County, Wisconsin, United States. The population was 1,117 at the 2020 census.

== Geography ==
Potter Lake is located at 42°49′18″N 88°20′56″W (42.821598, −88.348858).

According to the United States Census Bureau, the CDP has a total area of 1.3 square miles (3.4 km^{2}), of which 1.1 square miles (2.7 km^{2}) is land and 0.2 square mile (0.6 km^{2}) (18.70%) is water.

== Demographics ==
Historical population
Census	Pop.	Note	%±
2000	1,099		—
2010	1,107		0.7%
2020	1,117		0.9%
U.S. Decennial Census

As of the census of 2000, there were 1,099 people, 415 households, and 331 families residing in the CDP. The population density was 779.9 people per square mile (300.9/km^{2}). There were 460 housing units at an average density of 326.4/sq mi (126.0/km^{2}). The racial makeup of the CDP was 98.27% White, 0.18% African American, 0.09% Native American, 0.09% Asian, 0.36% from other races, and 1.00% from two or more races. Hispanic or Latino of any race were 0.82% of the population.

There were 415 households, out of which 34.9% had children under the age of 18 living with them, 72.0% were married couples living together, 4.3% had a female householder with no husband present, and 20.2% were non-families. 17.1% of all households were made up of individuals, and 4.1% had someone living alone who was 65 years of age or older. The average household size was 2.65 and the average family size was 2.98.

In the CDP, the population was spread out, with 24.4% under the age of 18, 6.6% from 18 to 24, 30.7% from 25 to 44, 29.5% from 45 to 64, and 8.8% who were 65 years of age or older. The median age was 40 years. For every 100 females, there were 110.9 males. For every 100 females age 18 and over, there were 106.7 males.

The median income for a household in the CDP was $54,427, and the median income for a family was $56,528. Males had a median income of $37,460 versus $22,500 for females. The per capita income for the CDP was $20,817. About 4.6% of families and 5.2% of the population were below the poverty line, including 9.2% of those under age 18 and none of those age 65 or over.
