= Lake Lorraine, Wisconsin =

Census-designated place in Wisconsin, United States

- Census-designated place
- Location within Wisconsin
- Coordinates: 42°43′56″N 88°44′34″W
- Country: United States
- State: Wisconsin
- County: Walworth

Area
  - Total: 1.250 sq mi (3.24 km^{2})
  - Land: 1.117 sq mi (2.89 km^{2})
  - Water: 0.133 sq mi (0.34 km^{2})
- Elevation: 942 ft (287 m)

Population (2020)
  - Total: 338
  - Density: 303/sq mi (117/km^{2})
- Time zone: UTC-6 (Central (CST))
  - Summer (DST): UTC-5 (CDT)
- Area code: 262
- GNIS feature ID: 2586518

Lake Lorraine is a census-designated place in the town of Richmond, Walworth County, Wisconsin, United States. Its population was 338 as of the 2020 census.

== Geography ==
Lake Koshkonong is located at coordinates 42°51′38″N 88°56′25″W. According to the United States Census Bureau, Lake Koshkonong has a total area of 77.25 km^{2}, of which 36.53 km^{2} is land and 40.72 km^{2} (52.71%) is water.

== Demographics ==
Historical population
Census	Pop.	Note	%±
2010	324		—
2020	338		4.3%
U.S. Decennial Census

Lake Lorraine had a population of 251 in 2023 (down 13.4% from 290 in 2022), a median age of 37.4 years, and a gender split of 54.2% male / 45.8% female.

The racial and ethnic composition was 90% White (Non-Hispanic), 5.98% White (Hispanic) of any race, and 3.98% Two or More Races (Non-Hispanic), with 0% Black, Asian, American Indian/Alaska Native, or Native Hawaiian/Pacific Islander residents; 100% of residents were U.S. citizens and 0.8% were foreign-born.

Median household income was $55,208 (a 17.8% decline from the prior year), the poverty rate was 13.9% (35 persons), and the homeownership rate was 69.9% with a median property value of $194,500.

There were 154 employed residents, led by manufacturing (69 workers), health care/social assistance (24), and educational services (18); median male earnings were $49,250 and female earnings $45,625, with an average commute of 27.3 minutes. Health-insurance coverage stood at 81.7% (54.6% employer-provided), leaving 18.3% uninsured.
