= Fairfield (community), Wisconsin =

Fairfield, Wisconsin
- Unincorporated community
- Location within Wisconsin Location within the United States
- Coordinates: 42°37′59″N 88°46′35″W
- Country: United States
- State: Wisconsin
- County: Walworth
- Elevation: 915 ft (279 m)
- Time zone: UTC-6 (Central (CST))
  - Summer (DST): UTC-5 (CDT)
- Area code: 262
- GNIS feature ID: 1564806

Fairfield is an unincorporated community located in the towns of Bradford in Rock County and Darien in Walworth County, Wisconsin, United States.

== History ==
The earliest reference to Fairfield is a description from John W. Hunt's 1853 Wisconsin Gazetteer: "FAIRFIELD, P. O., (Maxson's Mtill), in town of Bradford, county of Rock, on section 13, town 2 N., of range 15 E. It is 11 miles southeast from county seat, and 50 miles east of south from Madison. Population 100, 12 dwellings, 2 stores, 1 grist mill, and Presbyterian and Baptist denominations. It is on Turtle Creek, 16 miles from Beloit, and on the county line between Rock and Walworth, 9 miles from the state line. The first settler was Joseph Maxson."

Fairfield also has a cemetery, Fairfield/Pioneer Cemetery, located on east side of County Highway C, Sec 1. It is an active cemetery with 72 burials.

== Sources ==
- Source: U.S. Geographic Names Information Server
- Source: Hunt, John W. Wisconsin Gazetteer (Madison, 1853)
