= Turtle Lake, Walworth County, Wisconsin =

Census-designated place in Wisconsin, United States

Turtle Lake, Wisconsin
- Census-designated place
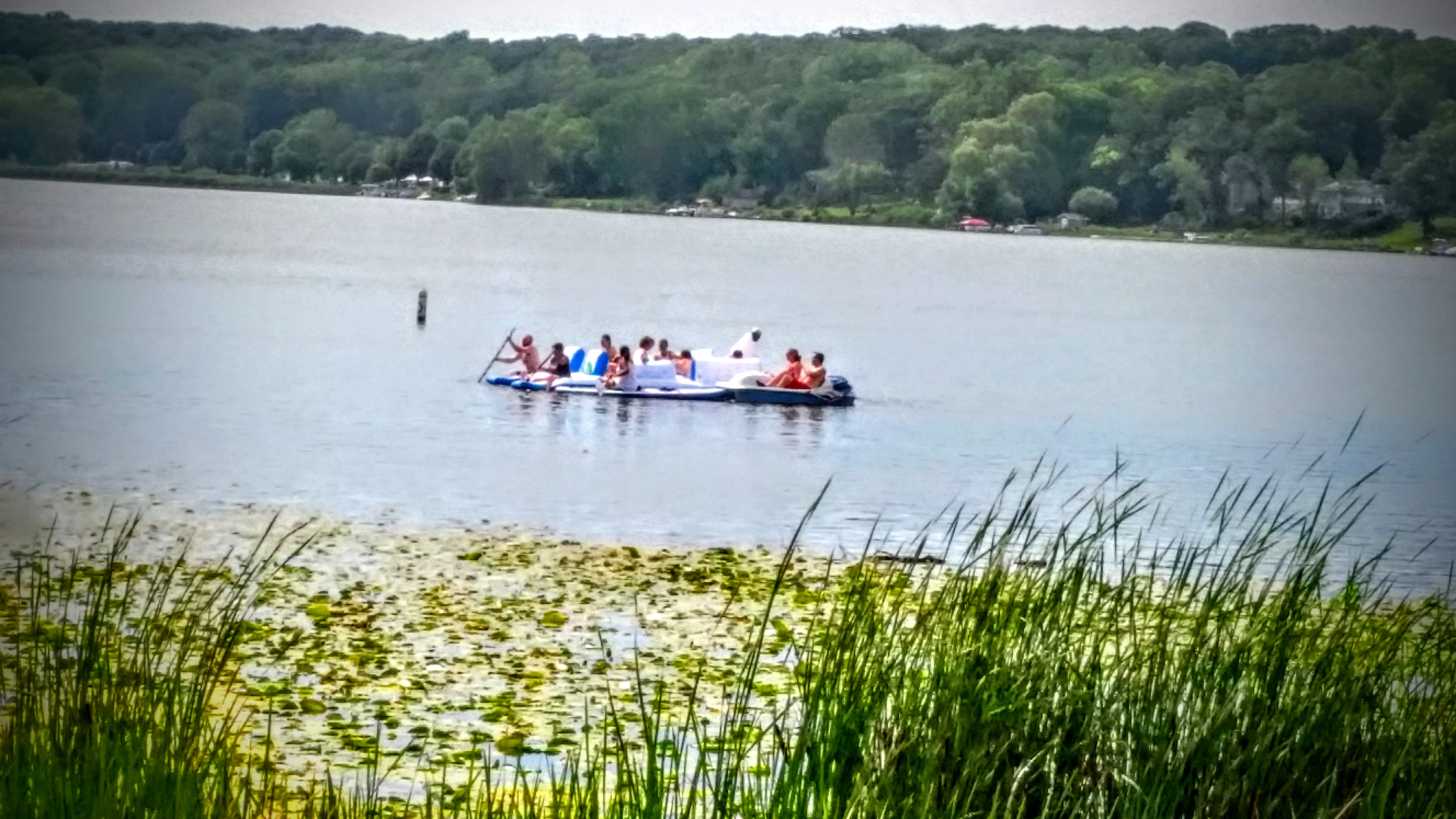

- Location within Wisconsin
- Coordinates: 42°43′46″N 88°41′03″W
- Country: United States
- State: Wisconsin
- County: Walworth

Area
  - Total: 1.081 sq mi (2.80 km^{2})
  - Land: 0.846 sq mi (2.19 km^{2})
  - Water: 0.235 sq mi (0.61 km^{2})
- Elevation: 922 ft (281 m)

Population (2020)
  - Total: 348
  - Density: 411/sq mi (159/km^{2})
- Time zone: UTC-6 (Central (CST))
  - Summer (DST): UTC-5 (CDT)
- Area code: 262
- GNIS feature ID: 2586563

Turtle Lake is a census-designated place (CDP) in the town of Richmond, Walworth County, Wisconsin, United States. Its population was 348 as of the 2020 census.

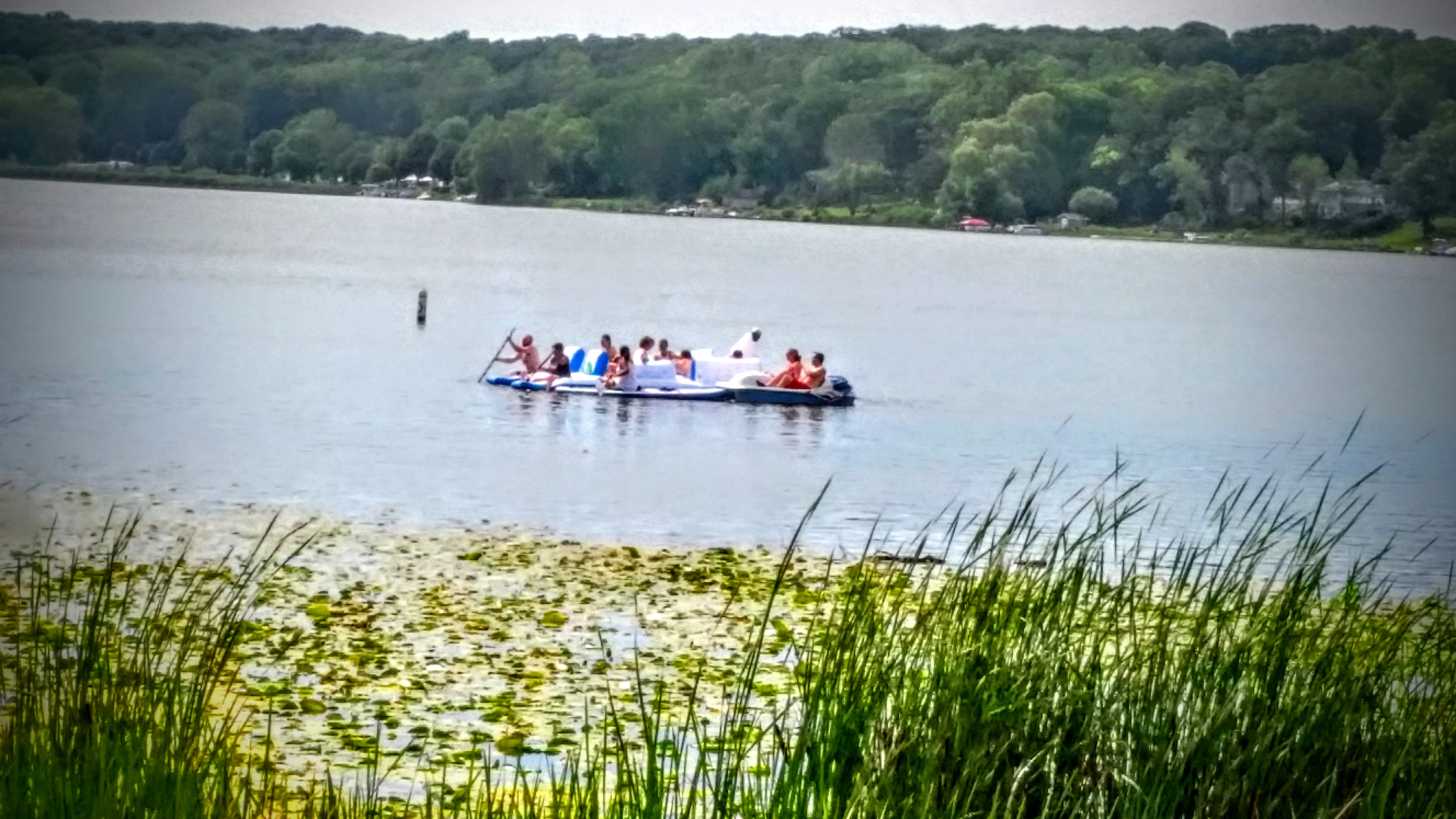
Floating on spring fed Turtle Lake

Turtle Lake is 141 acres and has a maximum depth of 30 feet. Visitors have access to the lake from a public boat landing. Fish include panfish, largemouth bass, and northern pike. The lake's water is moderately clear.

== Demographics ==
According to the United States Census Bureau, the median household income in Turtle Lake is $60,781, with a total of 230 housing units and 133 households. 33.0% of Turtle Lake residents have a Bachelor's degree or higher. The employment rate is 55.6%, and 8.8% of the population is without health care coverage. Of the total population of 348, 42 residents identify as Hispanic or Latino (of any race).

The median age in Turtle Lake is 56.8, whereas the median age in Wisconsin is 40.4. 18.7% of the population is 65 years and older.

Regarding ancestry, 6.3% of residents claimed English ancestry, 35.4% claimed German ancestry, 28.4% claimed Irish ancestry, 2.2% claimed Italian ancestry, 3.4% claimed Norwegian ancestry, 4.9% claimed Polish ancestry, and 1.1% claimed Scottish ancestry.

Of languages spoken at home, 13.9% of the population speak a language other than English at home. In this regard, 10.8% of the population speak Spanish at home, and 3.2% speak other Indo-European languages.

The foreign born population comprises 13.1% of the total population of Turtle Lake, and 8.6% of the population moved from a different state a year prior to the 2022 American Community Survey.
