= Harriet G. R. Wright =

American politician

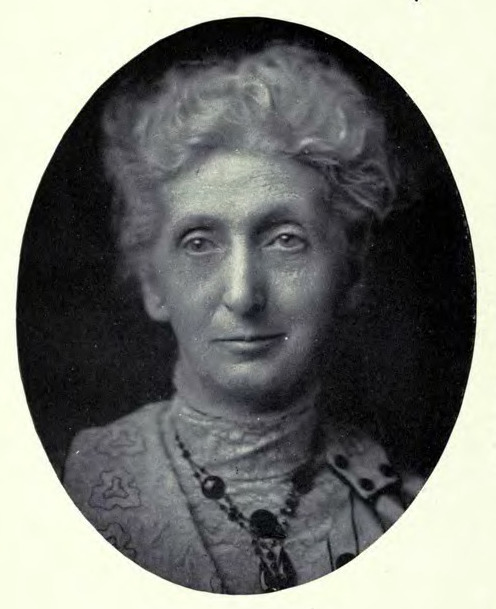

Member of the Colorado House of Representatives
- In office 1899–1901

Personal details
- Born: Harriet Goodrich Rosenkrans Wright; October 11, 1845 East Troy, Wisconsin Territory, U.S.
- Died: September 15, 1928 (aged 82) Los Angeles, California, U.S.
- Party: Democratic
- Other political affiliations: Populist
- Spouse: Henry Wright
- Children: 4
- Parent: Cyrus E. Rosenkrans (father)
- Education: Rockford College

Harriet Goodrich Rosenkrans Wright (October 11, 1845 – September 15, 1928) was an American politician and suffragist who served in the Colorado House of Representatives.

== Life ==
Harriet G. R. Wright was born on October 11, 1845, to Cyrus E. Rosenkrans in East Troy, Wisconsin Territory. She married Henry Wright, a pioneer who had lived in the Colorado Territory during its foundation in 1861. They had four children. In 1872, she and her family moved to Colorado, and later moved to Denver in 1882.

In 1898, she was elected to the Colorado House of Representatives under a Populist-Democratic fusion ticket, and ran for state senate in 1912 as a Democrat, but was defeated. She served as the vice chairwoman of The People's Party Arapahoe County Central Committee in 1900. She later served as president of the National American Woman Suffrage Association's affiliate in Colorado. During the 1900 United States presidential election she supported William Jennings Bryan and served as a committee member on a pro-Bryan women committee.

In 1922, she moved to California along with one of her children. She died on September 15, 1928, in Los Angeles, after four years of illness.
