= Richmond, Walworth County, Wisconsin =

Town in Walworth County, Wisconsin, United States

Town of Richmond, Wisconsin
- Town
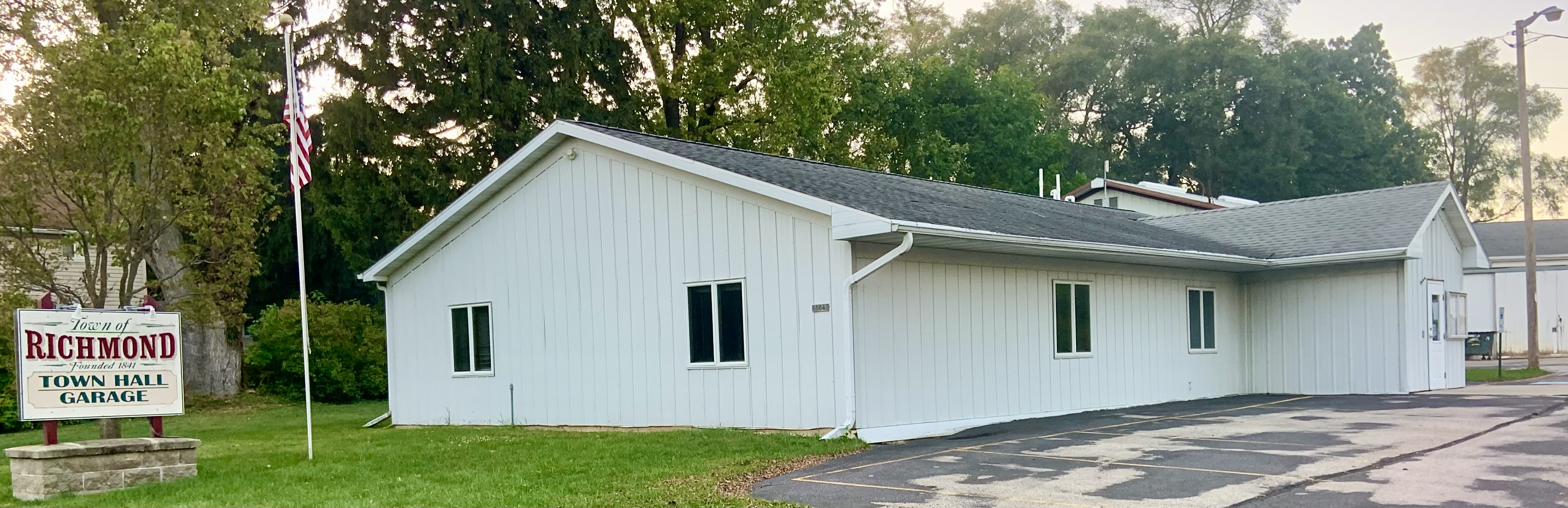
- Town hall

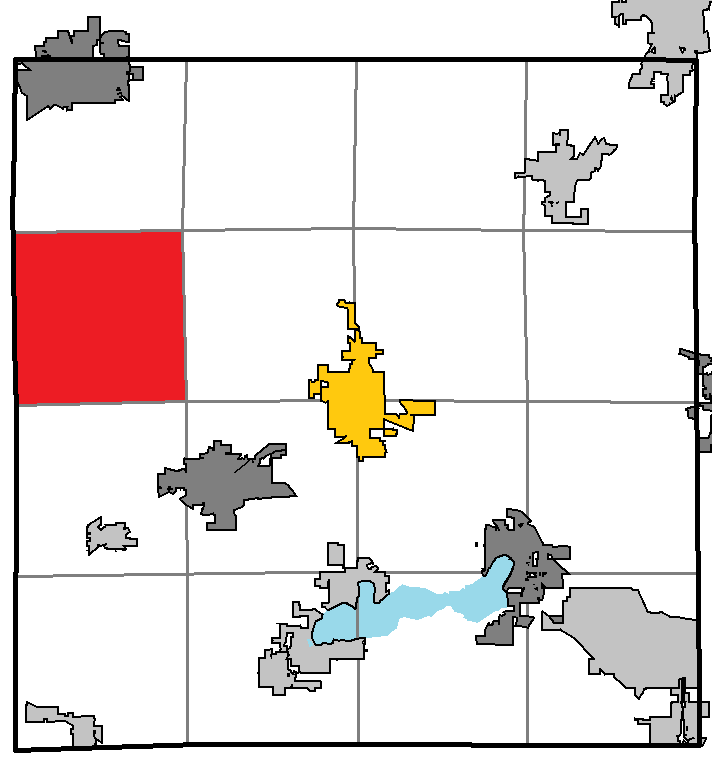
- Location of Richmond, within Walworth County

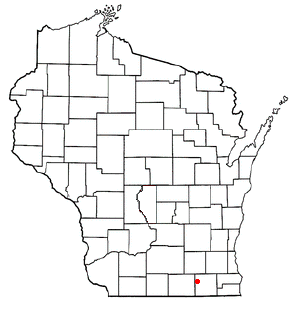
- Location of the Town of Richmond, Wisconsin
- Coordinates: 42°43′15″N 88°42′27″W
- Country: United States
- State: Wisconsin
- County: Walworth

Area
  - Total: 36.0 sq mi (93.2 km^{2})
  - Land: 35.3 sq mi (91.4 km^{2})
  - Water: 0.69 sq mi (1.8 km^{2})
- Elevation: 978 ft (298 m)

Population (2020)
  - Total: 1,901
  - Density: 52/sq mi (20.1/km^{2})
- Time zone: UTC-6 (Central (CST))
  - Summer (DST): UTC-5 (CDT)
- Zip: 53160
- Area code: 262
- FIPS code: 55-67725
- GNIS feature ID: 1584030
- Website: https://townofrichmond-walworthwi.gov/

Richmond is a town in Walworth County, Wisconsin, United States. As of the 2020 census, the town population was 1,901. The unincorporated communities of Lake Lorraine, Richmond, and Turtle Lake are located in the town.

== Geography ==
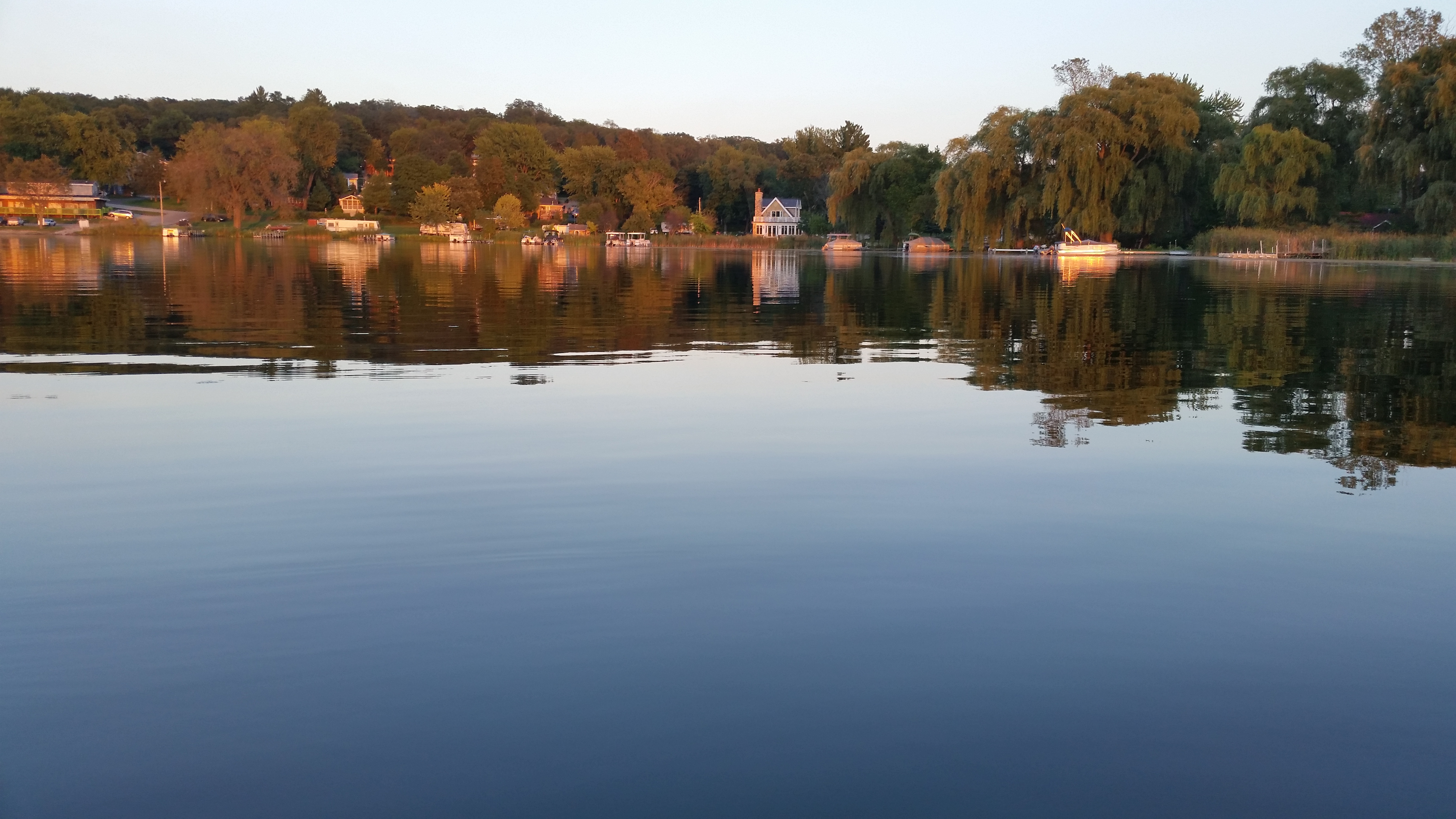
Turtle Lake

According to the United States Census Bureau, the town has a total area of 36.0 square miles (93.2 km^{2}), of which 35.3 square miles (91.4 km^{2}) is land and 0.7 square mile (1.8 km^{2}) (1.92%) is water.

== Demographics ==
As of the census of 2000, there were 1,835 people, 704 households, and 508 families residing in the town. The population density was 52.0 people per square mile (20.1/km^{2}). There were 899 housing units at an average density of 25.5 per square mile (9.8/km^{2}). The racial makeup of the town was 96.57% White, 0.05% African American, 0.38% Native American, 0.44% Asian, 2.29% from other races, and 0.27% from two or more races. Hispanic or Latino of any race were 4.52% of the population.

There were 704 households, out of which 32.0% had children under the age of 18 living with them, 63.6% were married couples living together, 4.7% had a female householder with no husband present, and 27.8% were non-families. 22.2% of all households were made up of individuals, and 6.1% had someone living alone who was 65 years of age or older. The average household size was 2.60 and the average family size was 3.06.

In the town, the population was spread out, with 25.1% under the age of 18, 5.4% from 18 to 24, 29.9% from 25 to 44, 27.6% from 45 to 64, and 12.0% who were 65 years of age or older. The median age was 40 years. For every 100 females, there were 103.7 males. For every 100 females age 18 and over, there were 102.2 males.

The median income for a household in the town was $51,776, and the median income for a family was $59,231. Males had a median income of $36,250 versus $26,474 for females. The per capita income for the town was $23,203. About 2.2% of families and 4.1% of the population were below the poverty line, including 2.0% of those under age 18 and 5.1% of those age 65 or over.

== Notable people ==
- Thomas James Jr. (1782–1858), founded Richmond, named after Richmond, Rhode Island, from whence he came, in 1837
- "Borax" Smith, American miner, business magnate and civic builder in the Mojave Desert and the San Francisco Bay Area, was born in Richmond
