= East Troy Municipal Airport =

Airport in Wisconsin, United States

- IATA: none; ICAO: none; FAA LID: 57C

Summary
- Airport type: Public
- Owner: Village of East Troy
- Serves: East Troy, Wisconsin
- Opened: June 1958
- Time zone: CST (UTC−06:00)
  - Summer (DST): CDT (UTC−05:00)
- Elevation AMSL: 860 ft (260 m)
- Coordinates: 42°47′50″N 088°22′21″W
- Website: easttroywi.gov/airport

Map
- Location of airport in Wisconsin 57C (the United States)

Runways
Direction	Length		Surface
Direction	ft	m	Surface
8/26	3,900	1,189	Asphalt
18/36	2,446	746	Turf

Statistics
- Aircraft operations (2021): 41,000
- Based aircraft (2024): 69
- Source: Federal Aviation Administration

East Troy Municipal Airport (FAA LID: 57C) is a village owned public use airport located 2 miles (3 km) northeast of the central business district of East Troy, Wisconsin, a village in Walworth County, Wisconsin, United States. It is included in the Federal Aviation Administration (FAA) National Plan of Integrated Airport Systems for 2025–2029, in which it is categorized as a local general aviation facility.

Although most airports in the United States use the same three-letter location identifier for the FAA and International Air Transport Association (IATA), this airport is assigned 57C by the FAA but has no designation from the IATA.

== Facilities and aircraft ==
East Troy Municipal Airport covers an area of 214 acres (86 ha) at an elevation of 860 feet (262 m) above mean sea level. It has two runways: 8/26 is 3,900 by 75 feet (1,189 x 23 m) with an asphalt surface and 18/36 is 2,446 by 75 feet (746 x 23 m) with a turf surface.

For the 12-month period ending May 5, 2021, the airport had 41,000 aircraft operations, an average of 112 per day: 98% general aviation, 2% air taxi and less than 1% military. In July 2024, there were 69 aircraft based at this airport: 59 single-engine, 3 multi-engine and 7 helicopter.

== See also ==
- List of airports in Wisconsin
