= Darien (town), Wisconsin =

Coordinates: 42°37′21″N 88°43′19″W

- Town
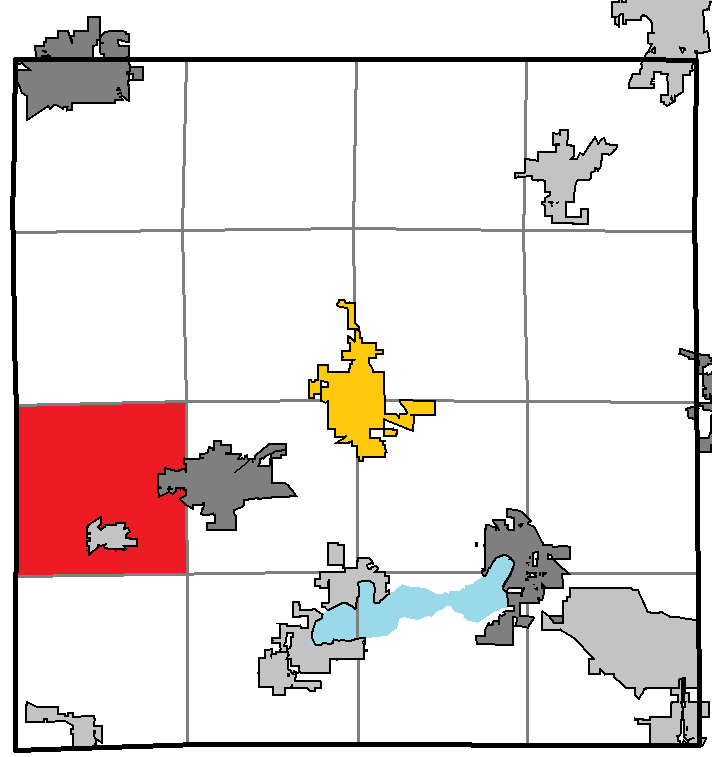
- Location of Darien, within Walworth County
- Country: United States
- State: Wisconsin
- County: Walworth

Area
  - Total: 34.1 sq mi (88.3 km^{2})
  - Land: 34.1 sq mi (88.2 km^{2})
  - Water: 0.039 sq mi (0.1 km^{2})

Population (2020)
  - Total: 1,651
  - Density: 48.5/sq mi (18.7/km^{2})
- Time zone: UTC-6 (CST)
  - Summer (DST): UTC-5 (CDT)
- ZIP Code: 53114
- Area code: 262
- Website: darientownwi.gov

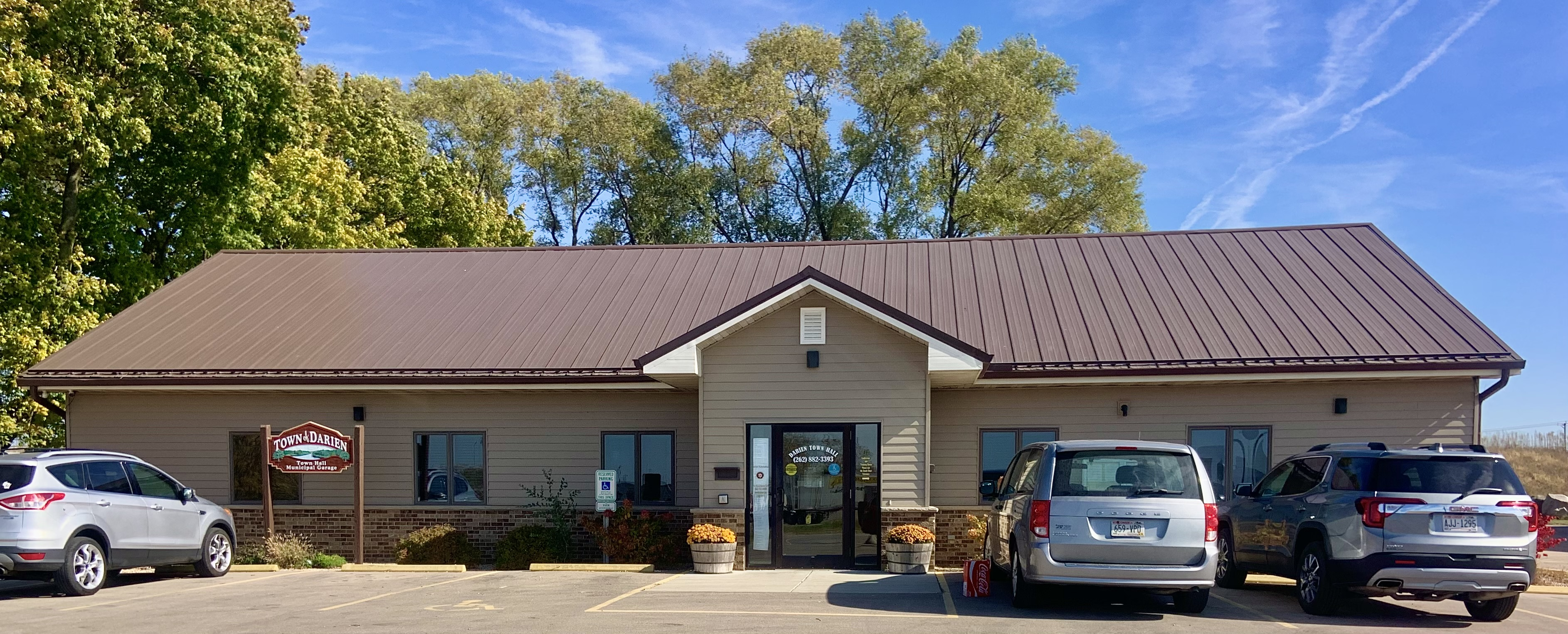
Darien Town Hall

Darien is a town in Walworth County, Wisconsin, United States. The population was 1,651 at the 2020 census. The village of Darien is surrounded by the town. The unincorporated community of Bardwell is in the town and the unincorporated communities of Allen's Grove and Fairfield are partly in the town.

== Geography ==
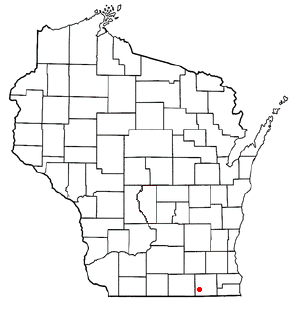
Location of Darien (town), Wisconsin

According to the United States Census Bureau, the town has a total area of 34.1 square miles (88.3 km^{2}), of which 34.0 square miles (88.2 km^{2}) is land and 0.04 square mile (0.1 km^{2}) (0.12%) is water.

== Demographics ==
As of the census of 2000, there were 1,747 people, 615 households, and 485 families residing in the town. The population density was 51.3 people per square mile (19.8/km^{2}). There were 650 housing units at an average density of 19.1 per square mile (7.4/km^{2}). The racial makeup of the town was 95.25% White, 0.40% Black or African American, 0.11% Native American, 0.17% Asian, 2.98% from other races, and 1.09% from two or more races. 8.36% of the population were Hispanic or Latino of any race.

There were 615 households, out of which 33.7% had children under the age of 18 living with them, 67.8% were married couples living together, 6.8% had a female householder with no husband present, and 21.1% were non-families. 16.4% of all households were made up of individuals, and 5.5% had someone living alone who was 65 years of age or older. The average household size was 2.75 and the average family size was 3.04.

In the town, the population was spread out, with 25.4% under the age of 18, 8.0% from 18 to 24, 28.8% from 25 to 44, 26.9% from 45 to 64, and 10.9% who were 65 years of age or older. The median age was 38 years. For every 100 females, there were 111.5 males. For every 100 females age 18 and over, there were 112.2 males.

The median income for a household in the town was $50,700, and the median income for a family was $52,443. Males had a median income of $35,842 versus $26,964 for females. The per capita income for the town was $19,580. About 4.2% of families and 9.5% of the population were below the poverty line, including 9.4% of those under age 18 and 10.9% of those age 65 or over.
