= East Troy, Wisconsin =

- Village
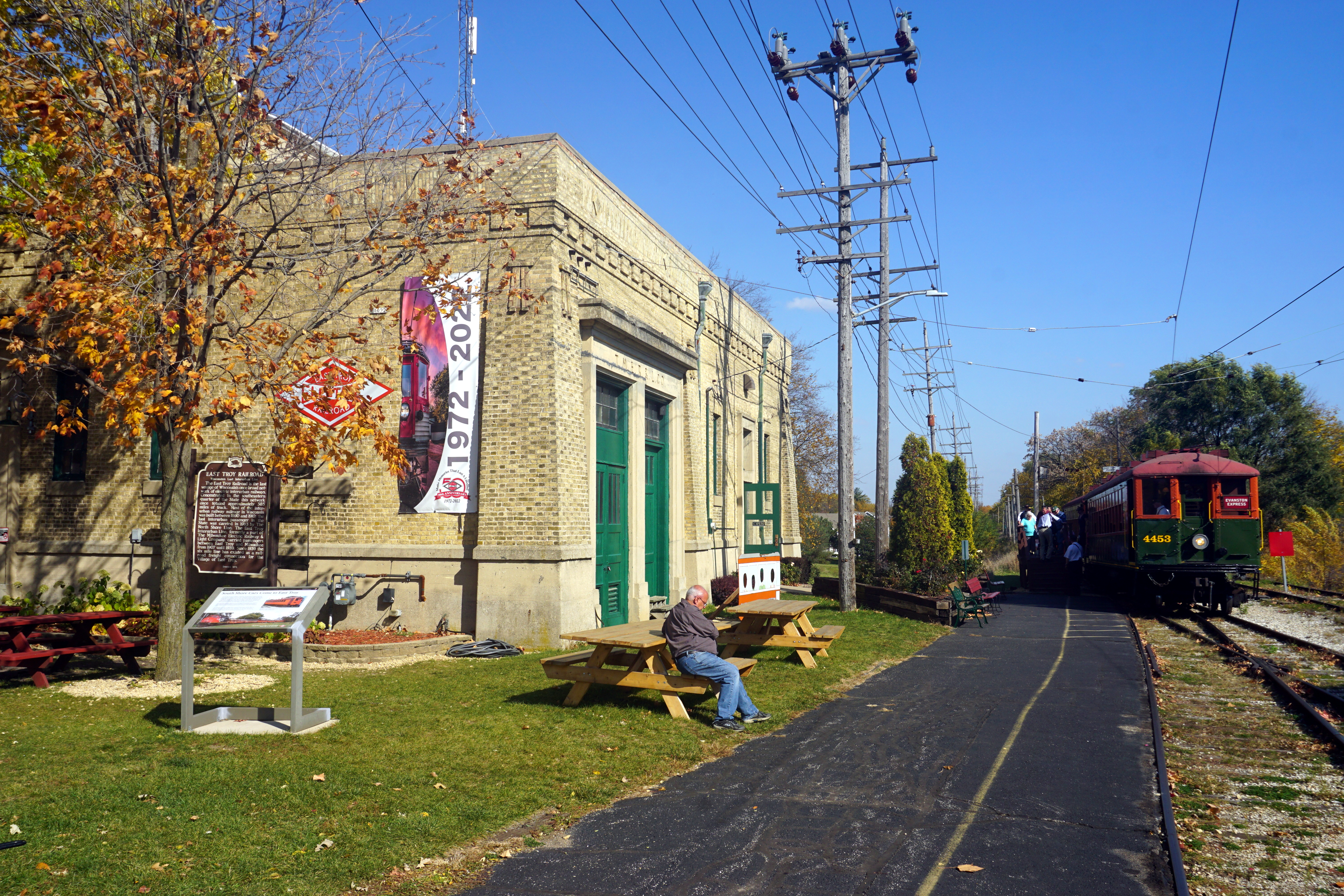
- East Troy Electric Railroad Museum

- Location of East Troy in Walworth County, Wisconsin.

- Location within Wisconsin Location within the United States
- Coordinates: 42°48′N 88°24′W
- Country: United States
- State: Wisconsin
- County: Walworth

Area
  - Total: 4.57 sq mi (11.83 km^{2})
  - Land: 4.53 sq mi (11.72 km^{2})
  - Water: 0.042 sq mi (0.11 km^{2})
- Elevation: 833 ft (254 m)

Population (2020)
  - Total: 5,673
  - Density: 952.9/sq mi (367.93/km^{2})
- Time zone: UTC-6 (Central (CST))
  - Summer (DST): UTC-5 (CDT)
- ZIP Code: 53120
- Area code: 262
- FIPS code: 55-22125
- GNIS feature ID: 1564382
- Website: easttroywi.gov

East Troy is a village in Walworth County, Wisconsin, United States. The population was 5,673 at the 2020 census. The village is surrounded by the Town of East Troy, with a small portion extending into the adjacent Town of Troy.

== Geography ==
East Troy is located at 42°48′N 88°24′W (42.7868, -88.4036).

According to the United States Census Bureau, the village has a total area of 4.51 square miles (11.68 km^{2}), of which 4.47 square miles (11.58 km^{2}) is land and 0.04 square miles (0.10 km^{2}) is water.

== Demographics ==
Historical population
Census	Pop.	Note	%±
1880	368		—
1890	463		25.8%
1910	673		—
1920	773		14.9%
1930	800		3.5%
1940	925		15.6%
1950	1,052		13.7%
1960	1,455		38.3%
1970	1,711		17.6%
1980	2,385		39.4%
1990	2,664		11.7%
2000	3,564		33.8%
2010	4,281		20.1%
2020	4,687		9.5%
U.S. Decennial Census

=== 2010 census ===
As of the census of 2010, there were 5673 people, 1,737 households, and 1,125 families living in the village. The population density was 957.7 inhabitants per square mile (369.8/km^{2}). There were 1,866 housing units at an average density of 417.4 per square mile (161.2/km^{2}). The racial makeup of the village was 95.9% White, 0.4% African American, 0.5% Native American, 0.6% Asian, 0.1% Pacific Islander, 1.1% from other races, and 1.4% from two or more races. Hispanic or Latino of any race were 4.0% of the population.

There were 1,737 households, of which 35.7% had children under the age of 18 living with them, 48.6% were married couples living together, 11.1% had a female householder with no husband present, 5.1% had a male householder with no wife present, and 35.2% were non-families. 29.2% of all households were made up of individuals, and 10.9% had someone living alone who was 65 years of age or older. The average household size was 2.44 and the average family size was 3.04.

The median age in the village was 36.1 years. 27% of residents were under the age of 18; 7.4% were between the ages of 18 and 24; 28.1% were from 25 to 44; 25.4% were from 45 to 64; and 12% were 65 years of age or older. The gender makeup of the village was 49.1% male and 50.9% female.

=== 2000 census ===
At the 2000 census, there were 3,564 people, 1,350 households and 984 families living in the village. The population density was 986.6 per square mile (381.2/km^{2}). There were 1,396 housing units at an average density of 386.4 per square mile (149.3/km^{2}). The racial makeup of the village was 96.77% White, 0.17% Black or African American, 0.28% Native American, 0.53% Asian, 1.35% from other races, and 0.90% from two or more races. 2.95% of the population were Hispanic or Latino of any race.

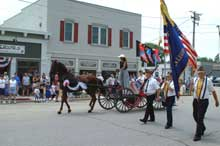
East Troy Village Square

There were 1,350 households, of which 37.6% had children under the age of 18 living with them, 59.5% were married couples living together, 9.6% had a female householder with no husband present, and 27.1% were non-families. 22.6% of all households were made up of individuals, and 9.8% had someone living alone who was 65 years of age or older. The average household size was 2.60 and the average family size was 3.07.

27.9% of the population were under the age of 18, 7.1% from 18 to 24, 32.3% from 25 to 44, 19.5% from 45 to 64, and 13.3% who were 65 years of age or older. The median age was 35 years. For every 100 females, there were 94.6 males. For every 100 females age 18 and over, there were 92.2 males.

The median household income was $48,397, and the median family income was $54,422. Males had a median income of $38,975 versus $25,179 for females. The per capita income for the village was $21,590. About 2.8% of families and 2.3% of the population were below the poverty line, including 2.4% of those under age 18 and 2.8% of those age 65 or over.

== Arts and culture ==
- East Troy Electric Railroad Museum
- Alpine Valley Music Theatre
- Alpine Valley Resort
- East Troy Bluegrass Festival
- Skydive Milwaukee - Sky Knights Sport Parachute Club
- East Troy Skatepark

== Transportation ==
East Troy is served by the East Troy Municipal Airport, (FAA LID: 57C). The Milwaukee Electric Railway and Light Company had a line running between Milwaukee and East Troy.

== Notable people ==
- Les Aspin, Congressman who lived in East Troy while in office.
- Alexander O. Babcock, Wisconsin State Representative
- Erik Buell, founder of Erik Buell Racing
- Eugene W. Chafin, Prohibition Party candidate for President of the United States
- Richard A. Flintrop, Wisconsin State Representative
- Sidney Clayton Goff, Wisconsin State Representative
- Gaylord Graves, Wisconsin State Representative
- Annie Haeger, Olympic sailor
- Lorena Hickok, journalist, friend of Eleanor Roosevelt
- Isabella Hofmann, actress
- Cody Horlacher, Wisconsin State Representative and lawyer
- Maxine Hough, Wisconsin State Assemblywomen
- Myrtle E. Johnson, marine biologist
- Mark W. Neumann, U.S. Representative
- Jared James Nichols, blues guitarist
- John F. Potter, member of the U.S. House of Representatives from Wisconsin (1857–1863)
- Clifford E. Randall, U.S. Representative
- Stevie Ray Vaughan, the blues guitarist, died in a helicopter crash following a concert at Alpine Valley in 1990.
- Harriet G. R. Wright, Colorado state representative
