= Lauderdale Lakes, Wisconsin =

Census-designated place in Wisconsin, United States

- Census-designated place
- Location within Wisconsin
- Coordinates: 42°46′16″N 88°34′43″W
- Country: United States
- State: Wisconsin
- County: Walworth

Area
  - Total: 5.440 sq mi (14.09 km^{2})
  - Land: 4.296 sq mi (11.13 km^{2})
  - Water: 1.144 sq mi (2.96 km^{2})
- Elevation: 889 ft (271 m)

Population (2020)
  - Total: 1,283
  - Density: 298.6/sq mi (115.3/km^{2})
- Time zone: UTC-6 (Central (CST))
  - Summer (DST): UTC-5 (CDT)
- Postal code: 53121
- Area code: 262
- GNIS feature ID: 2586523
- Website: Official website

Lauderdale Lakes is a census-designated place in the town of La Grange, Walworth County, Wisconsin, United States. Its population was 1,283 as of the 2020 census.

== History ==
The lakes were named after James Lauderdale. James moved to the area in 1841 along with his family. The New York native built the first residential building in 1842. James, his brother-in-law, and his cousin each purchased 160 acres of the Homestead Act price of $1.25 an acre. James and his family went back to New York and shortly returned in September 1842. James built a log cabin along the shore. James' wife didn't like living next to the water so they built a larger house next to the road in 1855. Eight years later, Chicago native John Wheeler bought the shoreline property and started building the Sterlingworth Hotel in 1893.

== Geography ==
The area sits within the town of La Grange, and is about 10 miles away from the nearest city, Elkhorn, as the crow flies. The area is home to the Lauderdale Lakes: Green Lake, Mill Lake, and Middle Lake. As part of this lake system are various bays and islands within the lakes. The area was carved out in the Last Glacial Period, and all lakes in the Lauderdale Lakes system are glacial lakes. The area is also home to many kettles and moraines, characteristic of southeastern Wisconsin.

Situated on a peninsula between Green Lake and Middle Lake is the Peterson Island Woods Preserve. It is a 40-acre park with a small trail. It was designated in 2016 by the Kettle Moraine Land Trust board to honor its former president of 15 years, Jerry Peterson.

== Demographics ==
Historical population
Census	Pop.	Note	%±
2010	1,172		—
2020	1,283		9.5%
U.S. Decennial Census

As of the 2020 US Census, the area had a total population of 1,283 people, 698 households, and a population density of 240/sq mi (91/sq km). The population is equally spread out among age groups with one group, females between the ages of 70 and 74, being a notable exception making up a disproportionately high amount of the population, 13.1%. The vast majority of the population sits along or near the shores of the lakes, with very little population elsewhere. The racial make up of the area is predominately white with 93.5% of the population being white. The area is also home to small numbers of Hispanic or Latino inhabitants and people of two or more races. The population is of mostly German ancestry along with other, more minor European ancestries including English, Polish, French (except Basque), Irish, Italian, and Norwegian. The area has a median household income of 84,167$, 13,171$ higher than the Wisconsin average. The area has a poverty rate of 5.2%, with a notable number of people under eighteen, 18.2%, falling below the poverty line. The area has an education rate of 38.9%.
