= Lauderdale, Wisconsin =

- Unincorporated community
- Location within Wisconsin Location within the United States
- Coordinates: 42°45′55″N 88°33′20″W
- Country: United States
- State: Wisconsin
- County: Walworth
- Elevation: 909 ft (277 m)
- Time zone: UTC-6 (Central (CST))
  - Summer (DST): UTC-5 (CDT)
- Area code: 262
- GNIS feature ID: 1567874

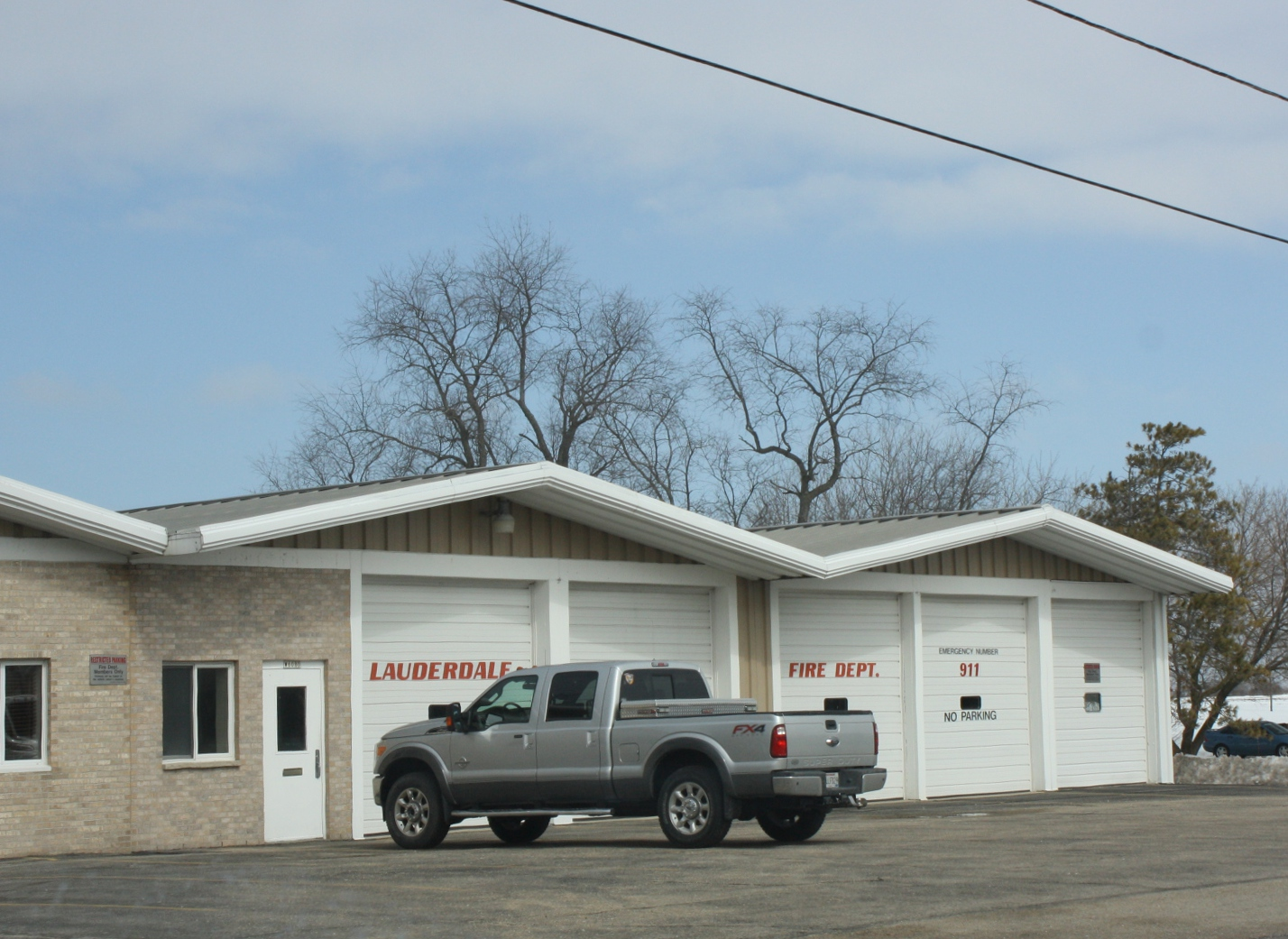
La Grange/Lauderdale fire department

Lauderdale is an unincorporated community located in the town of La Grange, Walworth County, Wisconsin, United States. The community is named for James Lauderdale, a member of the Wisconsin Assembly in 1853 and 1856. A post office was established in Lauderdale in April, 1881 by its first postmaster, Chester B. Williams.
