= La Grange, Walworth County, Wisconsin =

La Grange, Wisconsin
- Town
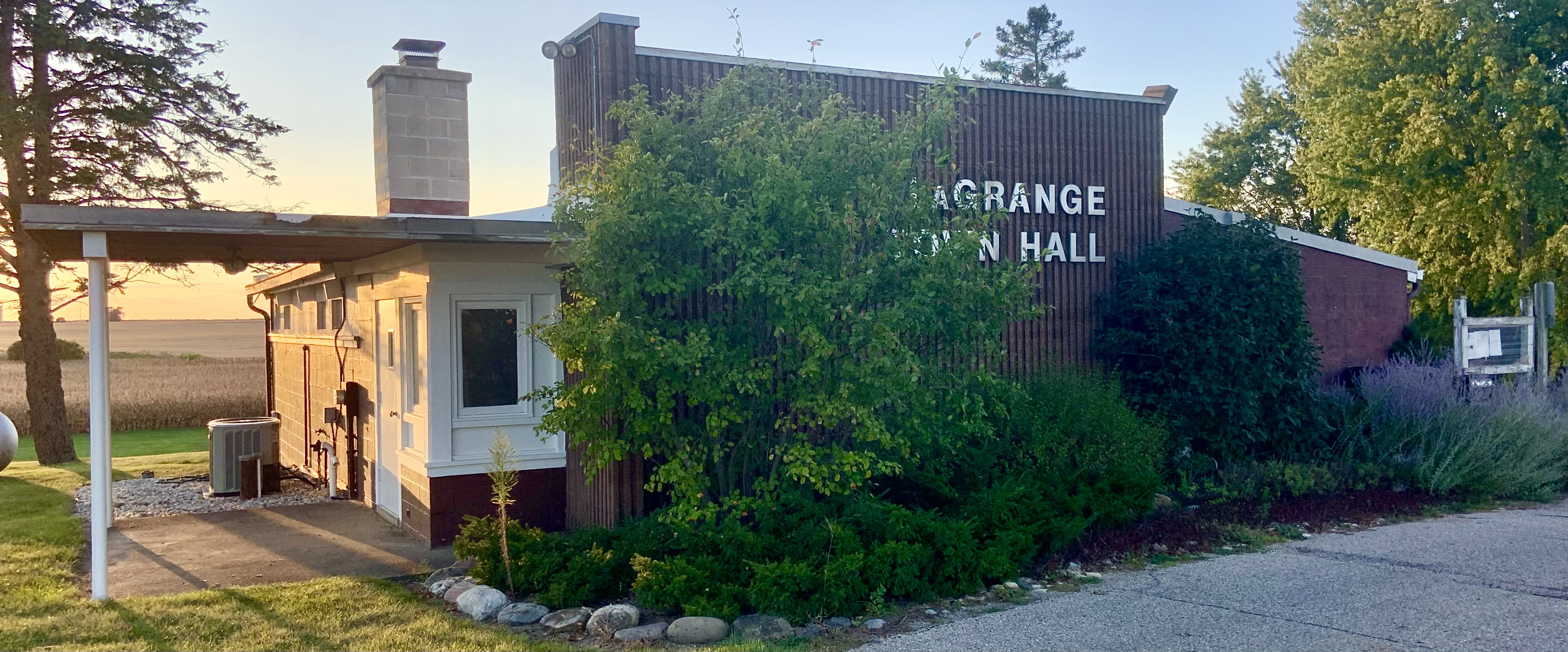
- Town hall

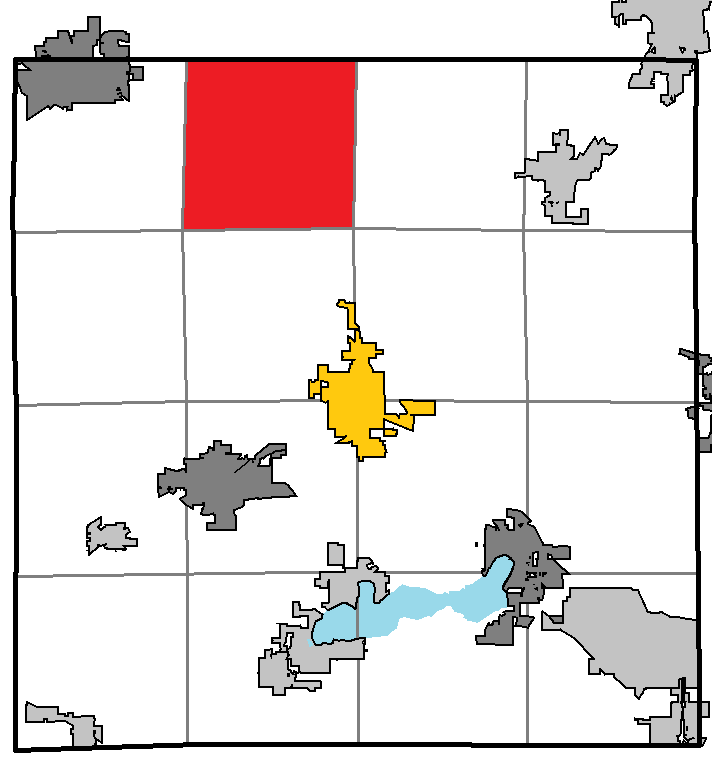
- Location of La Grange, within Walworth County

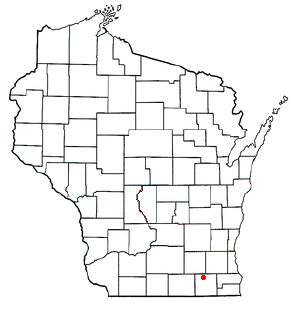
- Location of La Grange, Wisconsin
- Coordinates: 42°47′15″N 88°34′31″W
- Country: United States
- State: Wisconsin
- County: Walworth

Area
  - Total: 35.7 sq mi (92.5 km^{2})
  - Land: 34.3 sq mi (88.9 km^{2})
  - Water: 1.4 sq mi (3.6 km^{2})
- Elevation: 948 ft (289 m)

Population (2020)
  - Total: 2,472
  - Density: 71/sq mi (27.5/km^{2})
- Time zone: UTC-6 (Central (CST))
  - Summer (DST): UTC-5 (CDT)
- Area code: 262
- FIPS code: 55-41050
- GNIS feature ID: 1583507

La Grange is a town in Walworth County, Wisconsin, United States. The population was 2,472 at the 2020 census. The unincorporated communities of Heart Prairie, La Grange, Lauderdale, Lauderdale Lakes, and Lauderdale Shores are located in the town.

== History ==
The community was named after the manor of Marquis de la Fayette. "La Grange" is French for "the farm."

== Geography ==
According to the United States Census Bureau, the town has a total area of 35.7 square miles (92.5 km^{2}), of which 34.3 square miles (88.9 km^{2}) is land and 1.4 square miles (3.6 km^{2}) (3.92%) is water.

== Demographics ==
Historical population
Census	Pop.	Note	%±
2000	2,444		—
2010	2,454		0.4%
2020	2,472		0.7%
U.S. Decennial Census

As of the census of 2000, there were 2,444 people, 923 households, and 700 families residing in the town. The population density was 71.2 people per square mile (27.5/km^{2}). There were 1,723 housing units at an average density of 50.2 per square mile (19.4/km^{2}). The racial makeup of the town was 98.08% White, 0.12% African American, 0.12% Native American, 0.33% Asian, 0.08% Pacific Islander, 0.33% from other races, and 0.94% from two or more races. Hispanic or Latino of any race were 1.60% of the population.

There were 923 households, out of which 28.9% had children under the age of 18 living with them, 68.4% were married couples living together, 4.9% had a female householder with no husband present, and 24.1% were non-families. 17.9% of all households were made up of individuals, and 6.3% had someone living alone who was 65 years of age or older. The average household size was 2.61 and the average family size was 2.98.

In the town, the population was spread out, with 24.3% under the age of 18, 5.0% from 18 to 24, 29.6% from 25 to 44, 28.8% from 45 to 64, and 12.4% who were 65 years of age or older. The median age was 40 years. For every 100 females, there were 102.2 males. For every 100 females age 18 and over, there were 101.6 males.

The median income for a household in the town was $62,500, and the median income for a family was $69,952. Males had a median income of $45,924 versus $30,066 for females. The per capita income for the town was $26,798. About 4.8% of families and 8.6% of the population were below the poverty line, including 13.1% of those under age 18 and 2.1% of those age 65 or over.

== Notable people ==
- Everett E. Dow (1853-1929), member of the Wisconsin State Assembly during the 1901 session
