= East Troy (town), Wisconsin =

Civil town in Walworth County, Wisconsin

East Troy, Wisconsin
- Town
- Town of East Troy
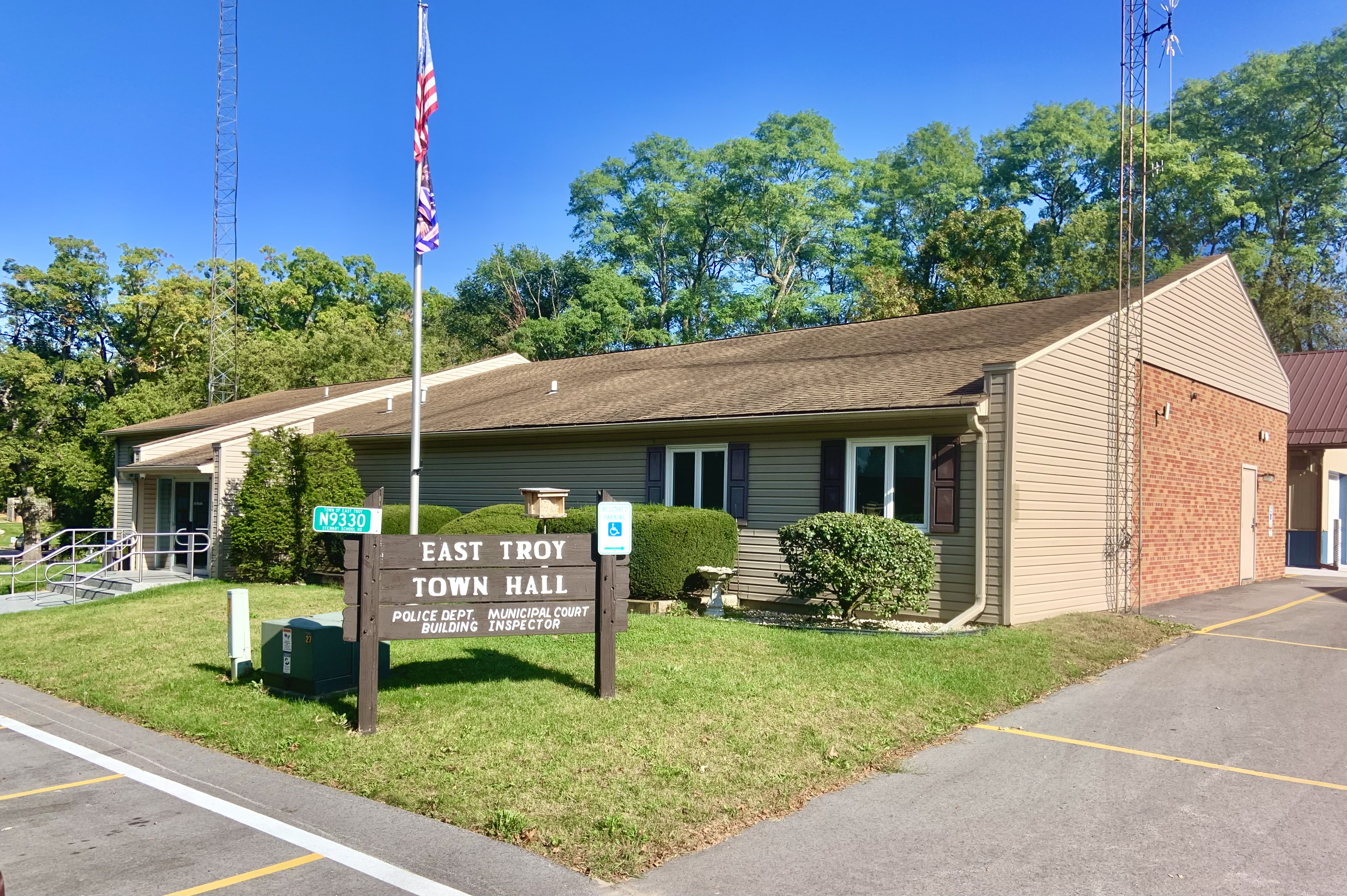
- East Troy Town Hall

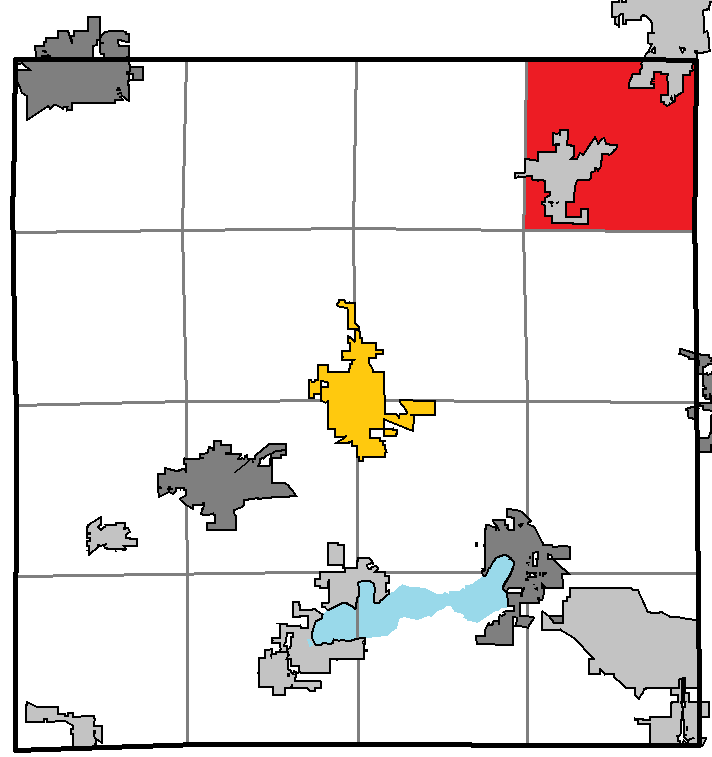
- Location of East Troy, within Walworth County

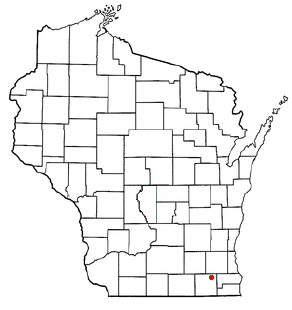
- Location of East Troy, Wisconsin
- Coordinates: 42°47′12″N 88°24′12″W
- Country: United States
- State: Wisconsin
- County: Walworth

Area
  - Total: 29.51 sq mi (76.4 km^{2})
  - Land: 27.73 sq mi (71.8 km^{2})
  - Water: 1.78 sq mi (4.6 km^{2})

Population (2020)
  - Total: 3,992
  - Density: 144.0/sq mi (55.58/km^{2})
- Time zone: UTC-6 (Central (CST))
  - Summer (DST): UTC-5 (CDT)
- Area code: 262
- GNIS feature ID: 1583120

East Troy is a town in Walworth County, Wisconsin, United States. The population was 3,992 as of the 2020 census. The unincorporated communities of Hilburn, Lake Beulah, and Potter Lake are located in the town, as was the ghost town of Army Lake. East Troy is also home to a summer camp. The town is quiet with only a few businesses, the rest is farmland. During the winter, the population drastically drops as many homes are lake homes.

== Geography ==
According to the United States Census Bureau, the town has a total area of 32.1 square miles (83.2 km^{2}), of which 30.3 square miles (78.6 km^{2}) is land and 1.8 square miles (4.6 km^{2}) (5.57%) is water.

== Demographics ==
Historical population
Census	Pop.	Note	%±
2000	3,830		—
2010	4,021		5.0%
2020	3,992		−0.7%
U.S. Decennial Census

As of the census of 2000, there were 3,830 people, 1,427 households, and 1,104 families residing in the town. The population density was 126.2 people per square mile (48.7/km^{2}). There were 1,753 housing units at an average density of 57.8 per square mile (22.3/km^{2}). The racial makeup of the town was 98.36% White, 0.23% Black or African American, 0.10% Native American, 0.23% Asian, 0.37% from other races, and 0.70% from two or more races. 1.15% of the population were Hispanic or Latino of any race.

There were 1,427 households, out of which 32.9% had children under the age of 18 living with them, 68.0% were married couples living together, 6.1% had a female householder with no husband present, and 22.6% were non-families. 17.4% of all households were made up of individuals, and 5.7% had someone living alone who was 65 years of age or older. The average household size was 2.67 and the average family size was 3.01.

In the town, the population was spread out, with 24.2% under the age of 18, 7.2% from 18 to 24, 28.2% from 25 to 44, 29.8% from 45 to 64, and 10.6% who were 65 years of age or older. The median age was 40 years. For every 100 females, there were 104.2 males. For every 100 females age 18 and over, there were 105.2 males.

The median income for a household in the town was $61,486, and the median income for a family was $65,056. Males had a median income of $44,087 versus $25,475 for females. The per capita income for the town was $30,461. About 2.1% of families and 2.9% of the population were below the poverty line, including 3.2% of those under age 18 and 2.6% of those age 65 or over.

== Gallery ==
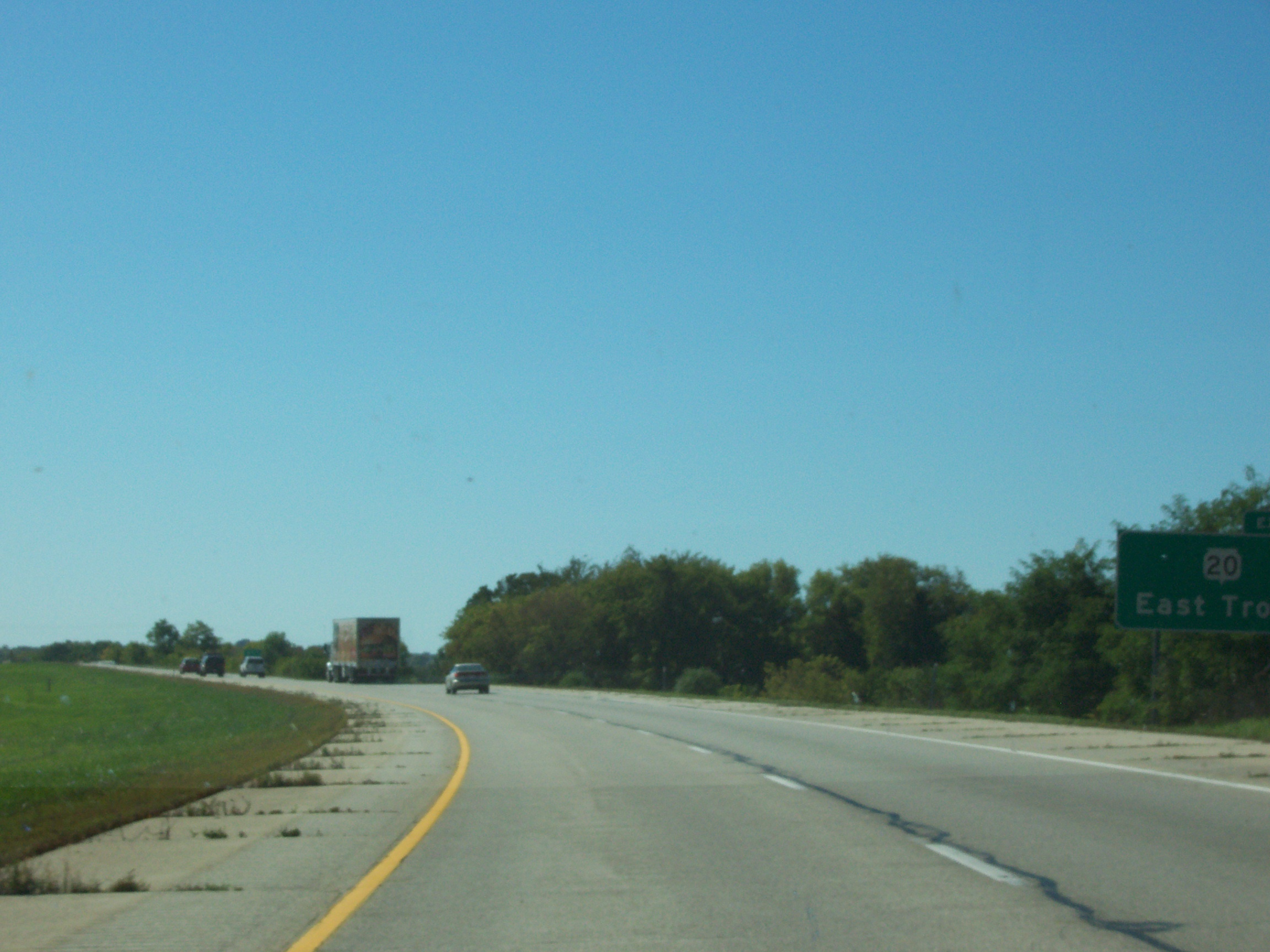
East Troy exit on Interstate 43

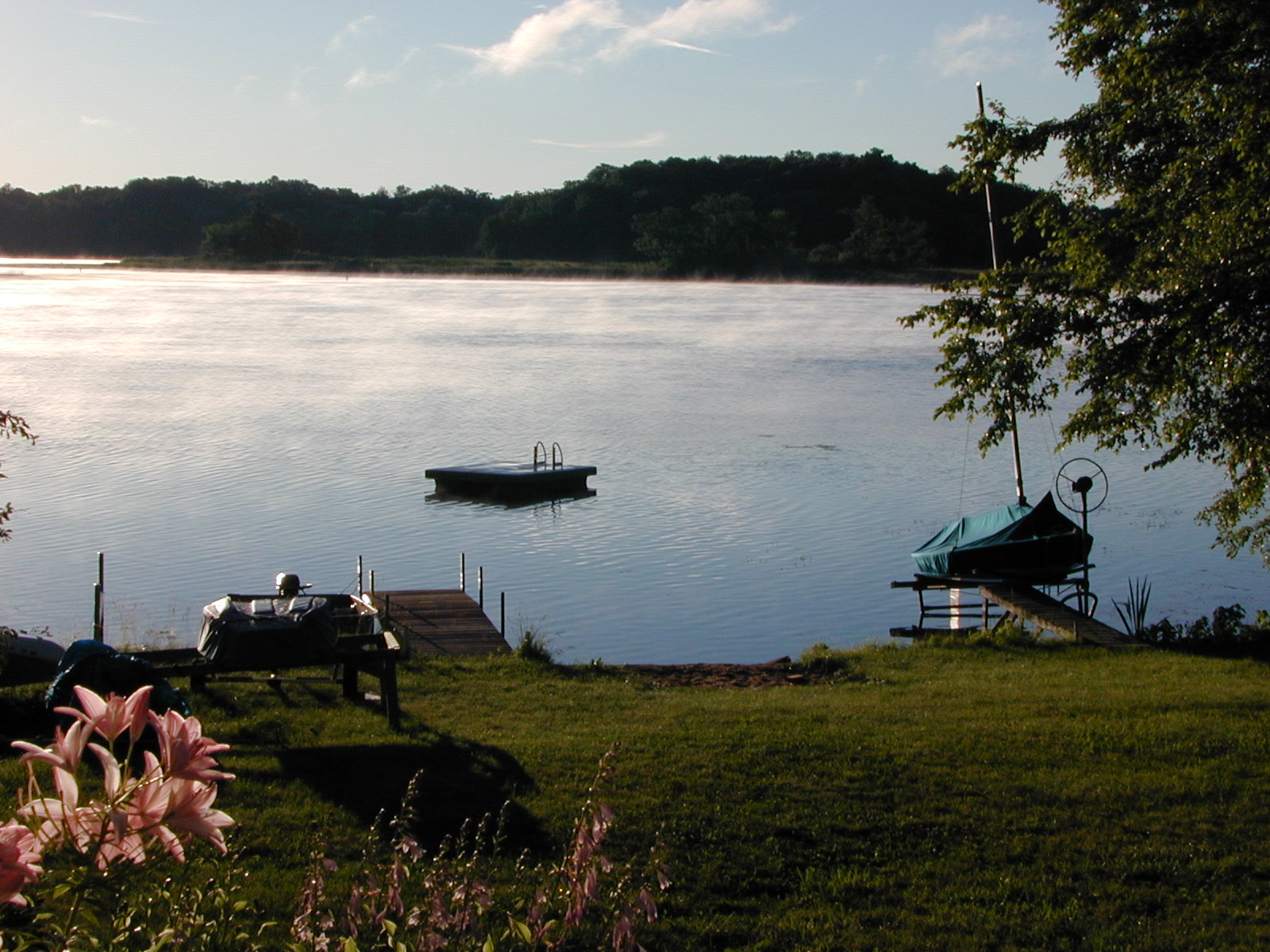
Lake Beulah, Town of East Troy

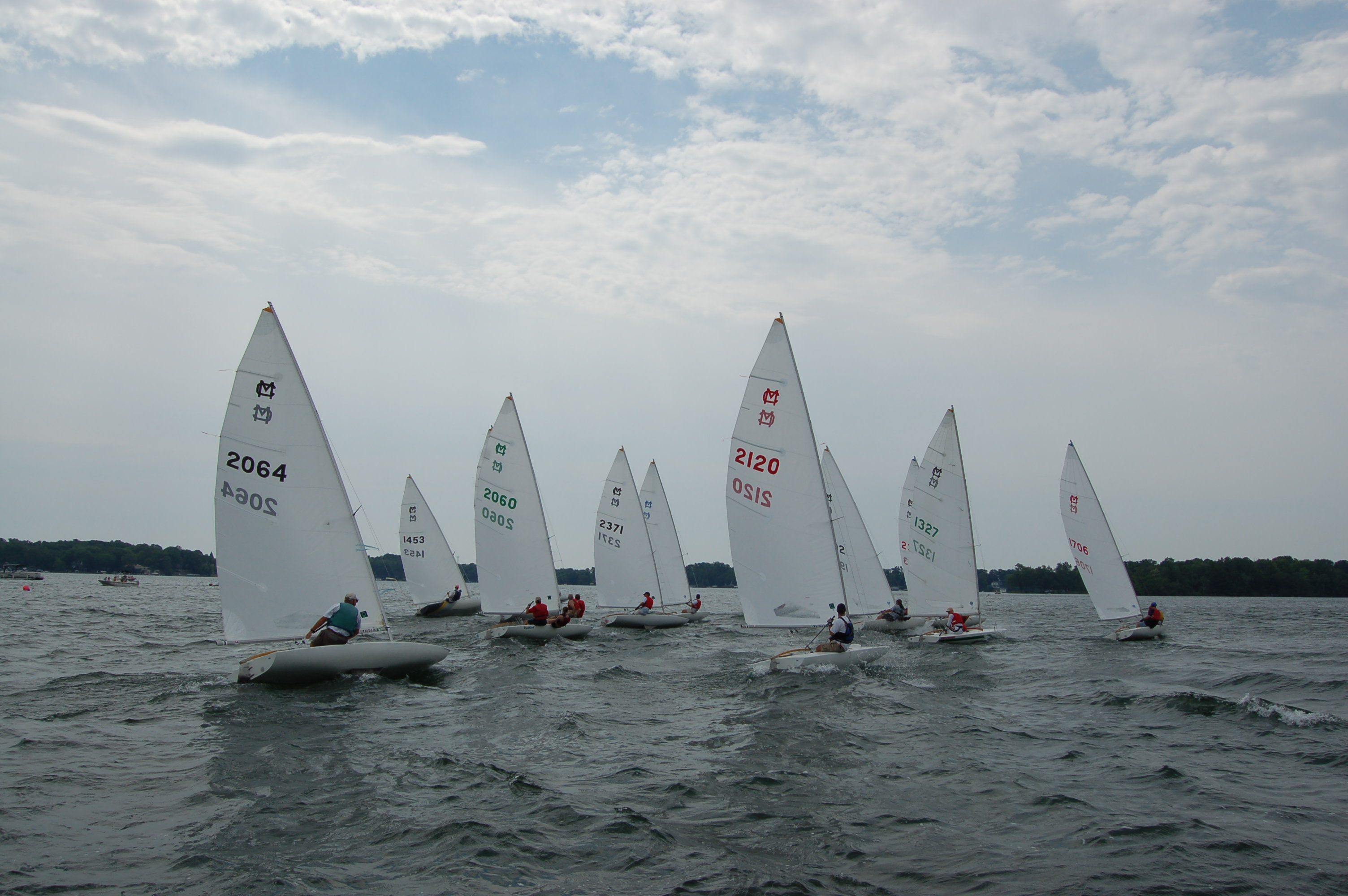
MC Scow sailors on Lake Beulah, Town of East Troy

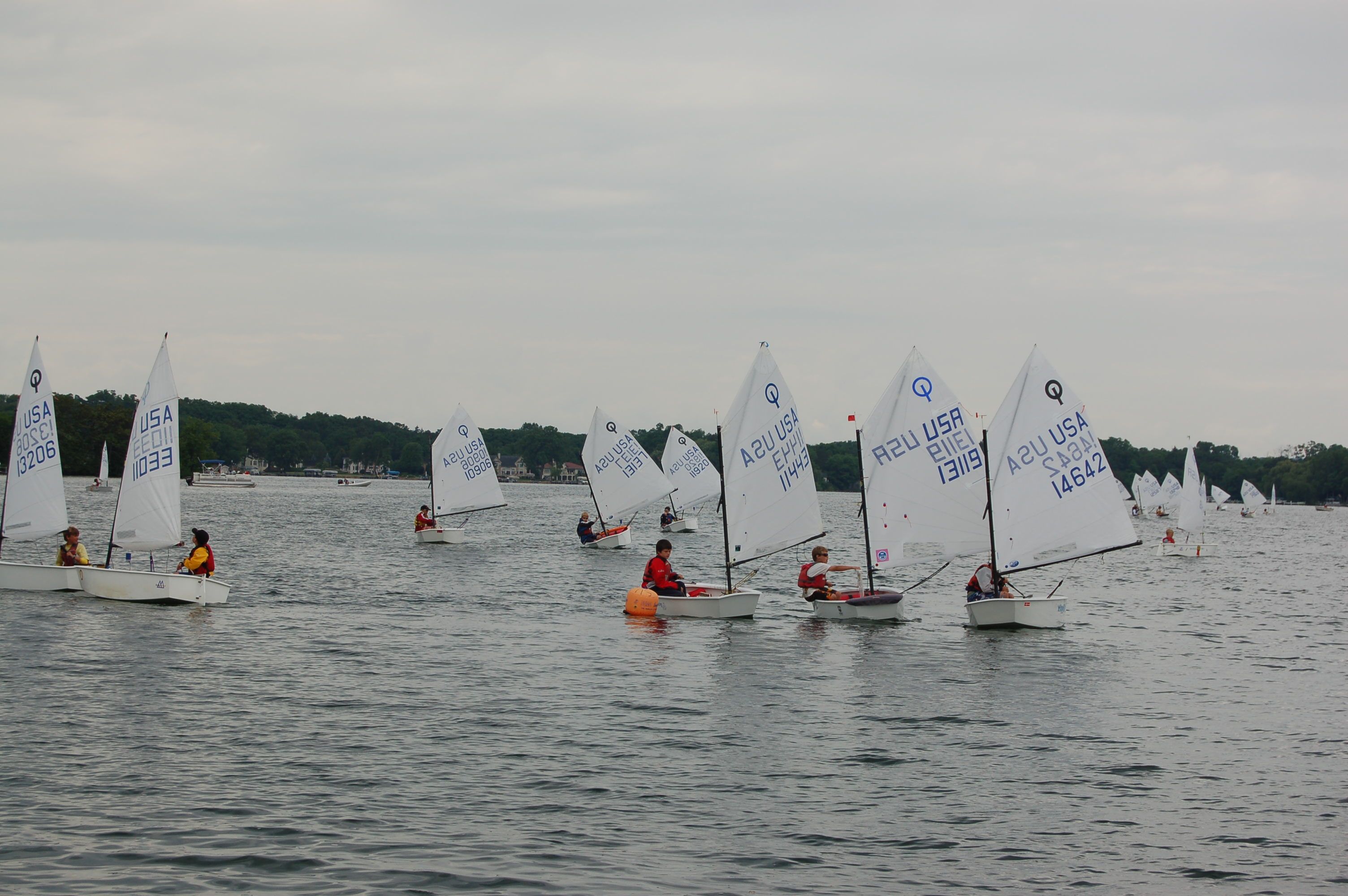
Opti sailors on Lake Beulah, Town of East Troy
