= Walworth County, Wisconsin =

County in Wisconsin, United States

- County
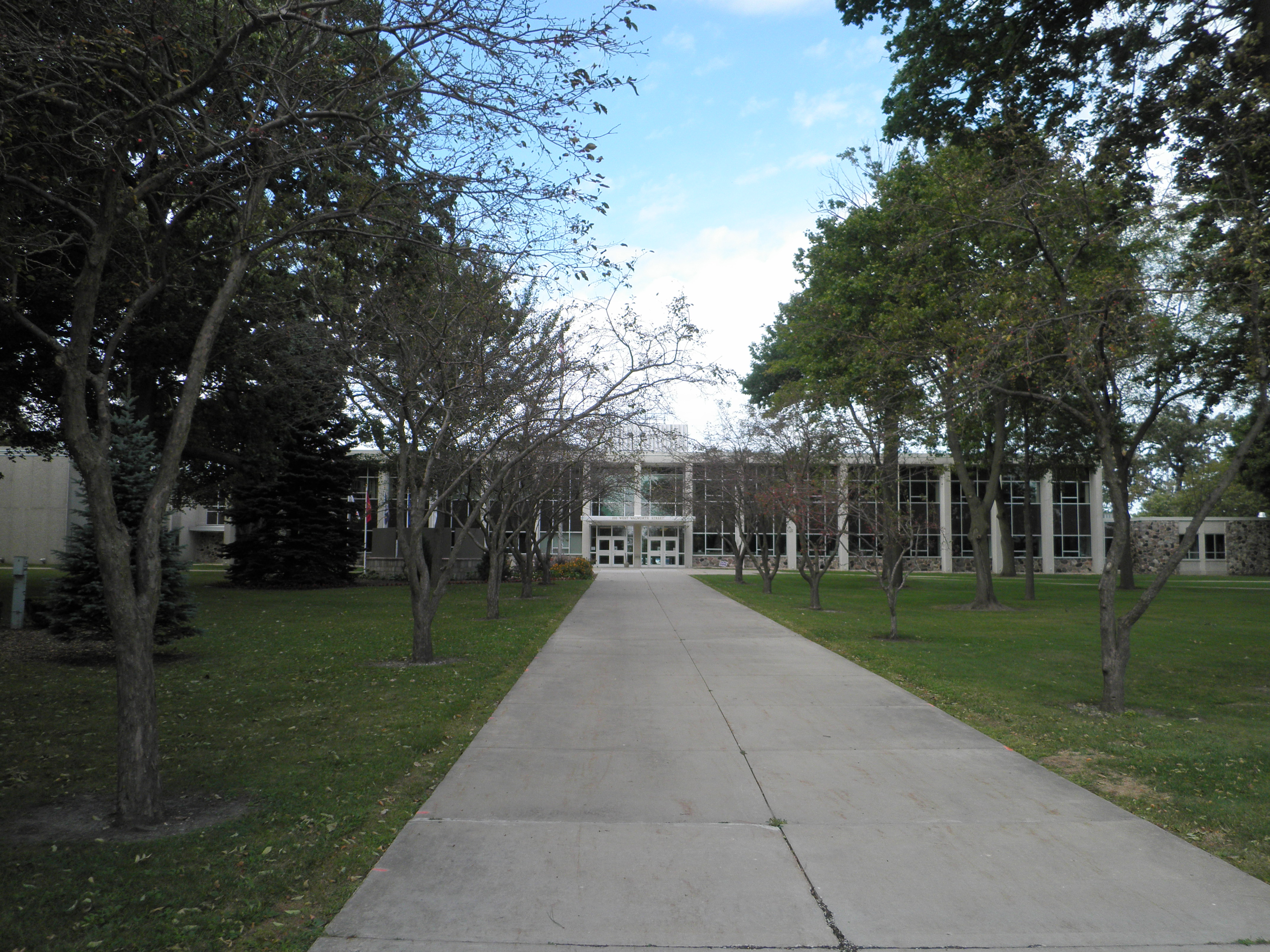
- Walworth County Courthouse

- Location within the U.S. state of Wisconsin
- Coordinates: 42°40′N 88°32′W
- Country: United States
- State: Wisconsin
- Founded: 1839
- Named for: Reuben H. Walworth
- Seat: Elkhorn
- Largest city: Whitewater

Area
  - Total: 577 sq mi (1,490 km^{2})
  - Land: 555 sq mi (1,440 km^{2})
  - Water: 21 sq mi (54 km^{2}) 3.7%

Population (2020)
  - Total: 106,478
  - Estimate (2025): 106,127 ▼
  - Density: 191.7/sq mi (74.0/km^{2})
- Time zone: UTC−6 (Central)
  - Summer (DST): UTC−5 (CDT)
- Congressional districts: 1st, 5th
- Website: www.co.walworth.wi.us

Walworth County is a county located in the U.S. state of Wisconsin. As of the 2020 census, the population was 106,478. Its county seat is Elkhorn. The county was created in 1836 from Wisconsin Territory and organized in 1839. It is named for Reuben H. Walworth. Walworth County comprises the Whitewater–Elkhorn, WI Micropolitan Statistical Area and is included in the Milwaukee–Racine–Waukesha, WI Combined Statistical Area. The University of Wisconsin–Whitewater is located in Walworth County.

Walworth County features several major tourist destinations: Lake Geneva, Alpine Valley Resort, and Alpine Valley Music Theatre. Tourism is a large contributor to Walworth County's economy. It is Wisconsin's fifteenth largest county in population, but it is the sixth largest in terms of economic impact from tourism (nearly $1 billion in 2023).

== Geography ==
According to the U.S. Census Bureau, the county has a total area of 577 square miles (1,490 km^{2}), of which 555 square miles (1,440 km^{2}) is land and 21 square miles (54 km^{2}) (3.7%) is water. Lake Beulah is located within the county and covers 812 acres, reaches a maximum depth of 58 feet, and is classified as a drainage lake.

== Transportation ==
=== Major highways ===
- Interstate 43
- U.S. Highway 12
- U.S. Highway 14
- Highway 11 (Wisconsin)
- Highway 20 (Wisconsin)
- Highway 36 (Wisconsin)
- Highway 50 (Wisconsin)
- Highway 59 (Wisconsin)
- Highway 67 (Wisconsin)
- Highway 83 (Wisconsin)
- Highway 89 (Wisconsin)
- Highway 120 (Wisconsin)

=== Railroads ===
- Canadian National
- East Troy Electric Railroad
- Union Pacific
- Wisconsin and Southern Railroad

=== Airport ===
East Troy Municipal Airport (FAA LID: 57C), serves the county and surrounding communities

== Adjacent counties ==
- Waukesha County (northeast)
- Racine County (east)
- Kenosha County (east)
- McHenry County, Illinois (southeast)
- Boone County, Illinois (southwest)
- Rock County (west)
- Jefferson County (northwest)

== Demographics ==
Historical population
Census	Pop.	Note	%±
1840	2,611		—
1850	17,862		584.1%
1860	26,496		48.3%
1870	25,972		−2.0%
1880	26,249		1.1%
1890	27,860		6.1%
1900	29,259		5.0%
1910	29,614		1.2%
1920	29,327		−1.0%
1930	31,058		5.9%
1940	33,103		6.6%
1950	41,584		25.6%
1960	52,368		25.9%
1970	63,444		21.2%
1980	71,507		12.7%
1990	75,000		4.9%
2000	93,759		25.0%
2010	102,228		9.0%
2020	106,478		4.2%
2025 (est.)	106,127	▼	−0.3%
U.S. Decennial Census; 1790–1960 1900–1990; 1990–2000 2010 2020

=== Racial and ethnic composition ===
Walworth County, Wisconsin – Racial and ethnic composition Note: the US Census treats Hispanic/Latino as an ethnic category. This table excludes Latinos from the racial categories and assigns them to a separate category. Hispanics/Latinos may be of any race.
Race / ethnicity (NH = Non-Hispanic)	Pop 1980	Pop 1990	Pop 2000	Pop 2010	Pop 2020	% 1980	% 1990	% 2000	% 2010	% 2020
White alone (NH)	69,090	71,834	85,428	88,690	88,104	96.62%	95.78%	91.11%	86.76%	82.74%
Black or African American alone (NH)	416	443	747	904	1,166	0.58%	0.59%	0.80%	0.88%	1.10%
Native American or Alaska Native alone (NH)	114	193	177	196	229	0.16%	0.26%	0.19%	0.19%	0.22%
Asian alone (NH)	312	483	592	819	1,002	0.44%	0.64%	0.63%	0.80%	0.94%
Native Hawaiian or Pacific Islander alone (NH)	x	x	16	33	10	x	x	0.02%	0.03%	0.01%
Other race alone (NH)	245	30	46	67	268	0.34%	0.04%	0.05%	0.07%	0.25%
Mixed race or Multiracial (NH)	x	x	617	941	3,149	x	x	0.66%	0.92%	2.96%
Hispanic or Latino (any race)	1,330	2,017	6,136	10,578	12,550	1.86%	2.69%	6.54%	10.35%	11.79%
Total	71,507	75,000	93,759	102,228	106,478	100.00%	100.00%	100.00%	100.00%	100.00%

=== 2020 census ===
As of the 2020 census, the population was 106,478. The population density was 191.7 people per square mile (74.0 people/km^{2}). There were 53,146 housing units at an average density of 95.7 units per square mile (36.9 units/km^{2}).

The racial makeup of the county was 85.4% White, 1.1% Black or African American, 0.4% American Indian and Alaska Native, 1.0% Asian, <0.1% Native Hawaiian and Pacific Islander, 4.6% from some other race, and 7.4% from two or more races. Hispanic or Latino residents of any race comprised 11.8% of the population.

The median age was 41.0 years, with 20.2% of residents under the age of 18 and 18.8% of residents 65 years of age or older. For every 100 females there were 100.1 males, and for every 100 females age 18 and over there were 98.7 males age 18 and over.

63.1% of residents lived in urban areas, while 36.9% lived in rural areas.

There were 42,378 households in the county, of which 26.7% had children under the age of 18 living in them. Of all households, 48.8% were married-couple households, 19.6% were households with a male householder and no spouse or partner present, and 23.9% were households with a female householder and no spouse or partner present. About 28.6% of all households were made up of individuals and 12.5% had someone living alone who was 65 years of age or older.

There were 53,146 housing units, of which 20.3% were vacant. Among occupied housing units, 68.9% were owner-occupied and 31.1% were renter-occupied. The homeowner vacancy rate was 1.4% and the rental vacancy rate was 5.5%.

2000 Census Age Pyramid for Walworth County

=== 2000 census ===
At the 2000 census there were 93,759 people, 34,522 households, and 23,267 families in the county. The population density was 169 people per square mile (65 people/km^{2}). There were 43,783 housing units at an average density of 79 units per square mile (31 units/km^{2}). The racial makeup of the county was 94.49% White, 0.84% Black or African American, 0.23% Native American, 0.65% Asian, 0.03% Pacific Islander, 2.62% from other races, and 1.14% from two or more races. 6.54% of the population were Hispanic or Latino of any race. Of the 34,522 households 31.80% had children under the age of 18 living with them, 55.40% were married couples living together, 8.20% had a female householder with no husband present, and 32.60% were non-families. 24.70% of households were one person and 9.20% were one person aged 65 or older. The average household size was 2.57 and the average family size was 3.07.

The age distribution was 24.20% under the age of 18, 13.80% from 18 to 24, 27.60% from 25 to 44, 21.80% from 45 to 64, and 12.70% 65 or older. The median age was 35 years. For every 100 females there were 98.90 males. For every 100 females age 18 and over, there were 97.20 males.

In 2017, there were 918 births, giving a general fertility rate of 48.8 births per 1000 women aged 15–44, the sixth lowest rate out of all 72 Wisconsin counties.

== Communities ==
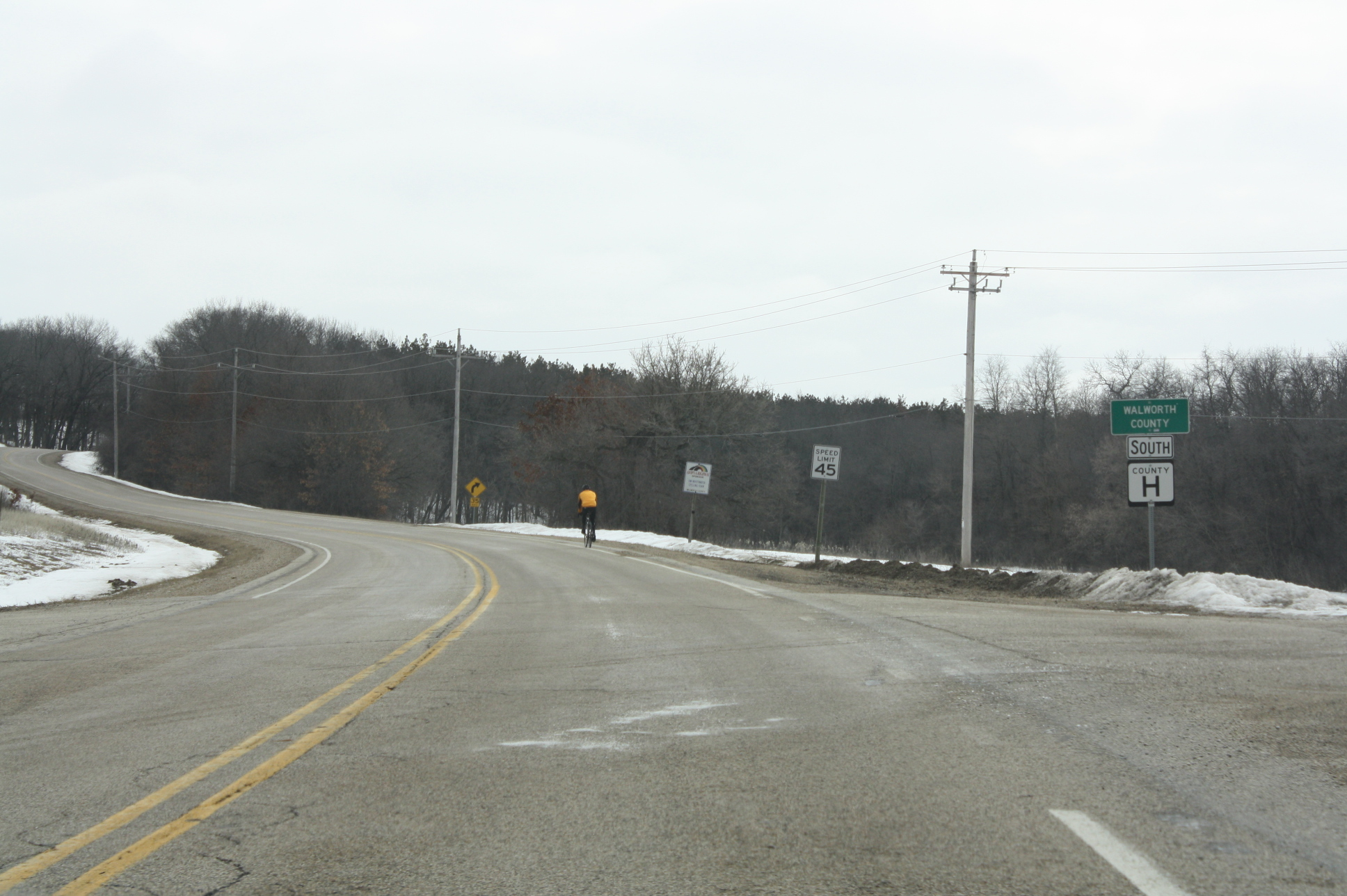
Walworth County sign

=== Cities ===
- Burlington (mostly in Racine County)
- Delavan

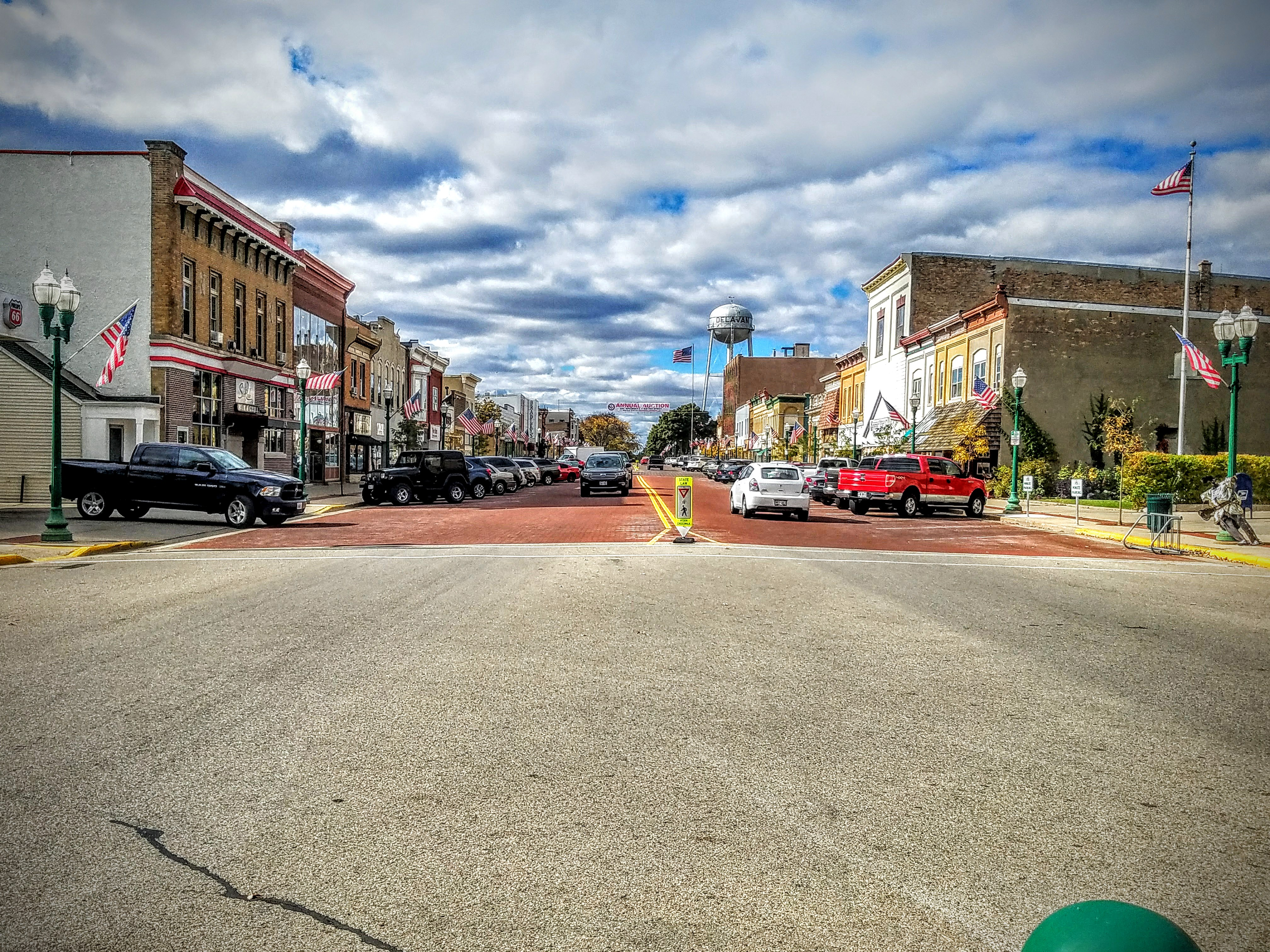
Delavan Wisconsin 9

- Elkhorn (county seat)
- Lake Geneva
- Whitewater (partly in Jefferson County)

=== Villages ===
- Bloomfield
- Darien
- East Troy
- Fontana-on-Geneva Lake
- Genoa City (partly in Kenosha County)
- Mukwonago (mostly in Waukesha County)
- Sharon
- Walworth
- Williams Bay

=== Towns ===
- Bloomfield
- Darien
- Delavan
- East Troy
- Geneva
- Lafayette
- La Grange
- Linn
- Lyons
- Richmond
- Sharon
- Spring Prairie
- Sugar Creek
- Troy
- Walworth
- Whitewater

=== Census-designated places ===
- Allen's Grove
- Big Foot Prairie
- Como
- Delavan Lake
- Lake Ivanhoe
- Lake Lorraine
- Lauderdale Lakes
- Lyons
- Potter Lake
- Springfield

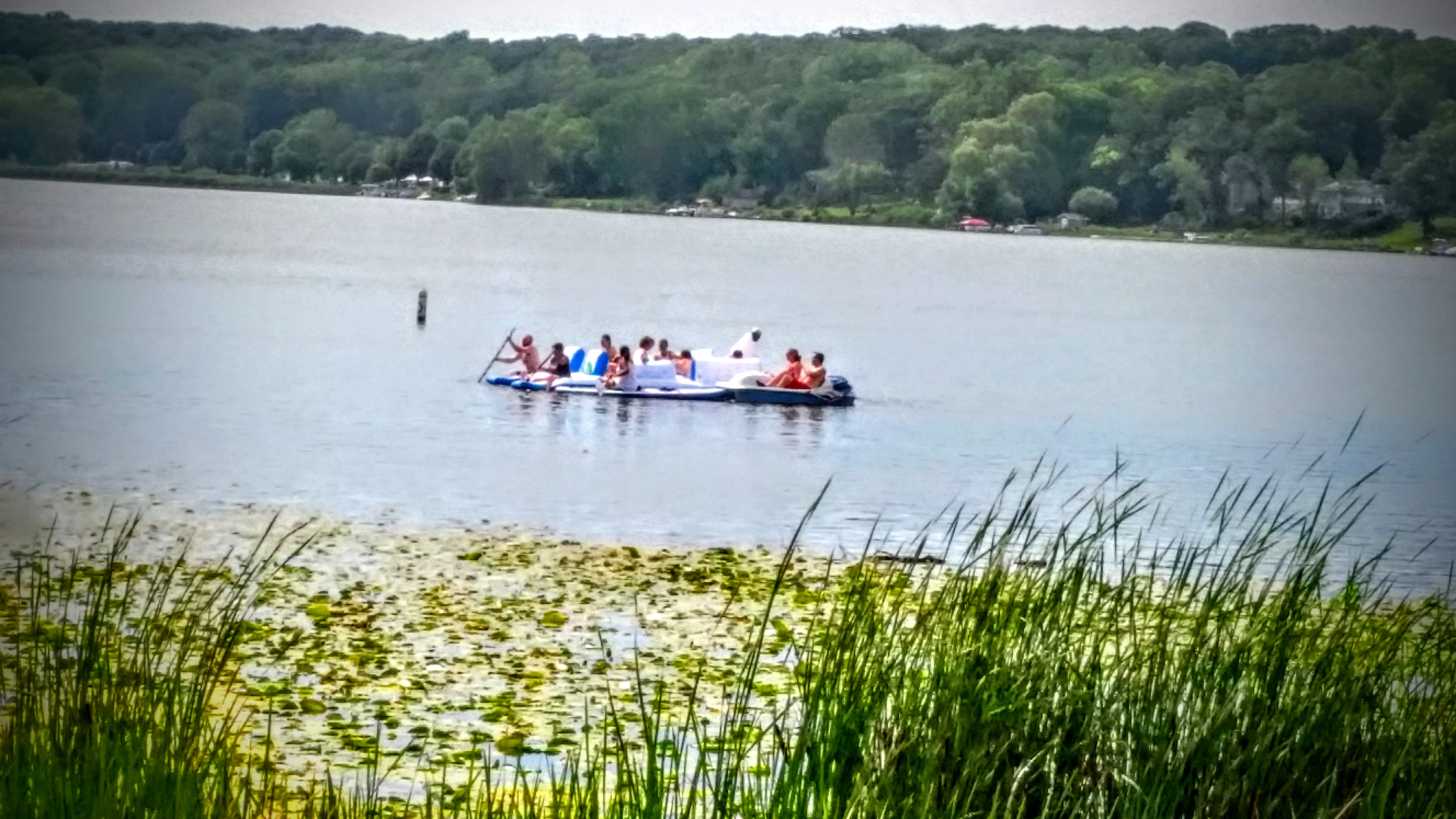
Turtle Lake floating

- Turtle Lake

=== Unincorporated communities ===
- Fairfield (partial)
- Honey Creek (partial)
- Honey Lake (partial)
- La Grange
- Lake Beulah
- Lauderdale
- Lauderdale Shores
- Little Prairie
- Millard
- Pell Lake
- Powers Lake
- Spring Prairie
- Tibbets
- Troy Center
- Voree
- Zenda

=== Ghost towns ===
- Army Lake
- Mayhews

== Politics ==
United States presidential election results for Walworth County, Wisconsin
Year	Republican		Democratic		Third party(ies)	
Year	No.	%	No.	%	No.	%
1892	3,871	58.52%	2,153	32.55%	591	8.93%
1896	5,347	70.41%	1,894	24.94%	353	4.65%
1900	5,102	71.41%	1,742	24.38%	301	4.21%
1904	4,892	73.42%	1,370	20.56%	401	6.02%
1908	4,151	62.21%	1,960	29.37%	562	8.42%
1912	2,096	35.88%	2,125	36.38%	1,620	27.73%
1916	3,988	59.66%	2,440	36.50%	257	3.84%
1920	8,437	80.68%	1,631	15.60%	390	3.73%
1924	7,484	57.22%	1,162	8.88%	4,434	33.90%
1928	9,846	69.36%	4,253	29.96%	97	0.68%
1932	7,858	52.91%	6,790	45.72%	204	1.37%
1936	8,462	52.67%	7,093	44.15%	511	3.18%
1940	11,594	67.59%	5,449	31.77%	111	0.65%
1944	10,901	65.34%	5,696	34.14%	86	0.52%
1948	10,509	65.07%	5,377	33.29%	265	1.64%
1952	16,906	75.57%	5,417	24.21%	49	0.22%
1956	16,696	76.62%	4,922	22.59%	172	0.79%
1960	16,395	67.19%	7,986	32.73%	20	0.08%
1964	12,225	50.92%	11,746	48.92%	38	0.16%
1968	15,040	61.85%	7,505	30.87%	1,770	7.28%
1972	17,823	66.09%	8,598	31.88%	546	2.02%
1976	18,091	57.79%	12,418	39.67%	798	2.55%
1980	19,194	56.90%	11,344	33.63%	3,192	9.46%
1984	20,595	67.06%	9,877	32.16%	238	0.77%
1988	18,259	59.50%	12,203	39.77%	223	0.73%
1992	15,727	42.74%	11,825	32.14%	9,244	25.12%
1996	15,099	45.81%	13,283	40.30%	4,579	13.89%
2000	22,982	56.80%	15,492	38.29%	1,984	4.90%
2004	28,754	59.35%	19,177	39.58%	515	1.06%
2008	25,485	50.54%	24,177	47.95%	760	1.51%
2012	29,006	55.46%	22,552	43.12%	745	1.42%
2016	28,863	56.16%	18,710	36.41%	3,818	7.43%
2020	33,851	58.77%	22,789	39.56%	960	1.67%
2024	36,603	60.40%	23,161	38.22%	833	1.37%

Owing to its Yankee heritage, which contrasts with the German-American or Scandinavian-American character of most of Wisconsin, Walworth County was initially a stronghold of the Free Soil Party. It voted for Martin van Buren and John P. Hale in Wisconsin's first two presidential elections, and its opposition to the spread of slavery led to its population voting Republican in subsequent elections, even resisting the appeal of Wisconsin native Robert La Follette when he carried the state in 1924 as a Progressive.

Walworth County remains strongly Republican. The only Democrat to carry the county was Woodrow Wilson in 1912, who won 36 percent of the vote. Even with the GOP mortally divided between President William Howard Taft and Theodore Roosevelt, Wilson only won the county by 29 votes. The best Democratic showings since then have been by Lyndon Johnson in 1964 and Barack Obama in 2008, both of whom received around 48 percent. Franklin D. Roosevelt and Bill Clinton are the only other Democrats since Wilson to cross the 40 percent mark, though John Kerry and Joe Biden came very close in 2004 and 2020, respectively.

== Education ==
School districts include:

K-12:

- Burlington Area School District
- Clinton Community School District
- Delavan-Darien School District
- East Troy Community School District
- Elkhorn Area School District
- Mukwonago School District
- Palmyra-Eagle Area School District
- Whitewater School District
- Williams Bay School District

Secondary:

- Big Foot Union High School District
- Lake Geneva-Genoa City Union High School District

Elementary:

- Fontana Joint No. 8 School District
- Geneva Joint No. 4 School District
- Genoa City Joint No. 2 School District
- Lake Geneva Joint No. 1 School District
- Linn Joint No. 4 School District
- Linn Joint No. 6 School District
- Sharon Joint No. 11 School District
- Walworth Joint No. 1 School District

Wisconsin School for the Deaf, a state-operated school, is in the county.

== See also ==
- National Register of Historic Places listings in Walworth County, Wisconsin
- Walworth County Fairgrounds
