= Big Foot Prairie, Wisconsin =

Census-designated place in Wisconsin, United States

- Census-designated place
- Location within Wisconsin Location within the United States
- Coordinates: 42°29′43″N 88°35′57″W
- Country: United States
- State: Wisconsin
- County: Walworth
- Town: Walworth

Area
  - Total: 0.032 sq mi (0.083 km^{2})
  - Land: 0.032 sq mi (0.083 km^{2})
  - Water: 0.0 sq mi (0 km^{2})
- Elevation: 955 ft (291 m)

Population (2020)
  - Total: 22
  - Density: 687.5/sq mi (265.4/km^{2})
- Time zone: UTC-6 (Central (CST))
  - Summer (DST): UTC-5 (CDT)
- ZIP Code: 53184 (Walworth)
- Area codes: 262
- FIPS code: 55-07315
- GNIS feature ID: 2807534

Big Foot Prairie is an unincorporated community and census-designated place in Walworth County, Wisconsin, United States. It was named a CDP for the 2020 census, at which time it had a population of 22. It is located in the Town of Walworth along U.S. Highway 14, 2.5 miles (4.0 km) south of the Village of Walworth. The community of Big Foot Prairie extends south into McHenry County, Illinois, where there is a CDP of the same name in Chemung Township.

== History ==
The community is named for Big Foot, a Potawatomi leader who resided on nearby Kishwauketoe (today known as Geneva Lake) until his band was forcibly removed by the United States in 1836. It once had a post office, which opened on May 15, 1848.

== Demographics ==
Historical population
| Census | Pop. | Note | %± |
|---|---|---|---|
| 2020 | 22 | | — |
U.S. Decennial Census; 2020

== Notable people ==
- Phipps W. Lake, Free Will Baptist minister and member of the Wisconsin State Assembly
- Lewis N. Wood, physician and member of the Wisconsin State Assembly
