= Big Foot Prairie =

Big Foot Prairie is an unincorporated community on the border between the U.S. states of Illinois and Wisconsin. The name may refer to:

- Big Foot Prairie, Illinois, a census-designated place comprising the Illinois portion of the community
- Big Foot Prairie, Wisconsin, a census-designated place comprising the Wisconsin portion of the community
