= Riviera Beach =

Riviera Beach may refer to some places in the United States:

- Riviera Beach, Florida
- Riviera Beach, Maryland
- Riviera Beach, Lake Geneva, Wisconsin
