= George H. Lown =

American politician

George H. Lown was an American politician from Walworth, Wisconsin who spent a single one-year term as a Free Soil Party member of the Wisconsin State Assembly from Walworth County. He would be succeeded in the Assembly by fellow Free Soiler George Sykes.

He had been elected as Chairman of the "Supervisors" (city council) when the first town meeting was held for what was originally called "Fontana" (later renamed "Walworth"), in a schoolhouse on Big Foot Prairie on April 4, 1843.
