= Lawrence, Illinois =

- Census-designated place
- Location within Illinois Location within the United States
- Coordinates: 42°26′36″N 88°38′30″W
- Country: United States
- State: Illinois
- County: McHenry
- Township: Chemung

Area
  - Total: 0.37 sq mi (0.95 km^{2})
  - Land: 0.37 sq mi (0.95 km^{2})
  - Water: 0 sq mi (0.00 km^{2})
- Elevation: 896 ft (273 m)

Population (2020)
  - Total: 220
  - Density: 598.5/sq mi (231.07/km^{2})
- Time zone: UTC-6 (Central (CST))
  - Summer (DST): UTC-5 (CDT)
- Postal code: 60033
- Area codes: 815 & 779
- GNIS feature ID: 2806518

Lawrence is an unincorporated community and census-designated place in Chemung Township, McHenry County, Illinois, United States. Lawrence is 2 miles (3.2 km) northwest of Harvard. It was named a CDP before the 2020 census, at which time it had a population of 220.

== History ==
A post office called Lawrence was established in 1856, and remained in operation until it was discontinued in 1903. The community was named for Lawrence Bigsby, the owner of the original town site.

=== January 2008 Tornado ===
On January 7, 2008, an EF3 tornado went through Lawrence. This caused major damage to several houses in the community. Although no deaths were reported, several injuries occurred. Although the initial tornado did little damage, a train that was operated by Wisconsin rail had been derailed and a tanker car containing hazardous materials rammed into the back of the locomotive before flipping over and leaking hazardous elements around the area, The entire crash was caught on video. This caused concerns to the community of Lawrence and later evacuated people in Lawrence and northern areas of the nearby town of Harvard. A fire was reported after the derailing of the train. The damage in the train crash is not known. Although the tornado alone caused about 8.3 million dollars in damages most likely from the train crash as the tornado did minor damage outside of Lawrence.

== Demographics ==
Historical population
Census	Pop.	Note	%±
2020	220		—
U.S. Decennial Census; 2020

Lawrence first appeared as a census designated place in the 2020 U.S. census.

=== 2020 census ===
Lawrence CDP, Illinois – Racial and ethnic composition Note: the US Census treats Hispanic/Latino as an ethnic category. This table excludes Latinos from the racial categories and assigns them to a separate category. Hispanics/Latinos may be of any race.
Race / Ethnicity (NH = Non-Hispanic)	Pop 2020	% 2020
White alone (NH)	159	72.27%
Black or African American alone (NH)	6	2.73%
Native American or Alaska Native alone (NH)	0	0.00%
Asian alone (NH)	2	0.91%
Native Hawaiian or Pacific Islander alone (NH)	0	0.00%
Other race alone (NH)	0	0.00%
Mixed race or Multiracial (NH)	11	5.00%
Hispanic or Latino (any race)	42	19.09%
Total	220	100.00%
