= Amerivespa Continental Scooter Rally =

Amerivespa is the largest annual motor scooter rally in the United States. The host city varies each year and the event date may range from May to July. Amerivespa is attended by 600-800 scooter enthusiasts from all over North America, Europe, and Asia. The rallies are joint-hosted by the nonprofit organization Vespa Club of America (VCOA), and scooter clubs local to the host city. All makes of scooters are welcome.

The 2023 Amerivespa rally was held in Flagstaff, Arizona June 1 - 4.

Vespa Club of America uses Amerivespa to promote scootering, drive VCOA membership, and to provide a celebratory atmosphere for all scooter enthusiasts. Rally events include; the presence of national and local scooter manufacturers, dealers, and supporting trade organizations displaying their newest products; showcases of the best restored and customized scooters; and group rides around the host city/region led by local scooter clubs.

== Amerivespa Host Cities ==
Year	Host City	Event Dates
2025	Portland, OR	June 11-14
2024	None, NA	N/A
2023	Flagstaff, AZ	June 1-4
2022	Twin Cities, MN	June 22–26
2019	Lake Geneva, WI	June 19-23
2018	Richmond, VA	June 6-10
2017	Seattle, WA	July 6–9
2016	Memphis, TN	June 23–26
2015	Indianapolis, IN	June 11–14
2014	New Orleans, LA	June 12–15
2013	San Diego, CA	June 27–30
2012	Lake Geneva, WI	June 21–24
2011	New Orleans, LA	June 16–19
2010	San Antonio, TX	May 27–31
2009	Los Gatos, CA	Unknown
2008	Chattanooga, TN	July 24–27
2007	Seattle, WA	July 12–15
2006	Denver, CO	Unknown
2005	Cleveland, OH	Unknown
2004	Salt Lake City, UT	June 24–27
2003	Madison, GA	May 23–25
2002	Portland, OR	Unknown
2001	Oklahoma City, OK	Unknown
2000	San Diego, CA	Unknown
1999	San Diego, CA	Unknown
1998	Knoxville, TN	Unknown
1997	Knoxville, TN	Unknown
1996	Manitou Springs, CO	Unknown
1995	Manitou Springs, CO	Unknown
1994	Springfield, MO	Unknown
1993	Springfield, MO	Unknown
