= Phipps W. Lake =

American politician

Phipps Waldo Lake (May 1, 1789 – August 17, 1860) was an American politician and Baptist clergyman.

Born in Hoosick, New York, Lake served in the United States Army during the War of 1812 was in the battle at Sacketts Harbor, New York. Lake was a minister in the Free Will Baptist Church and preached in Cortland and Montgomery Counties, New York. He lived in Ames, New York where he preached for fourteen years. In 1839, Lake moved to Big Foot, Wisconsin Territory in the town of Walworth. He farmed and was the Baptist minister of a church in Lake Geneva, Wisconsin. In 1854, Lake served in the Wisconsin State Assembly as a Whig and later joined the Republican Party. He died at his home in Big Foot Prairie, Wisconsin.
