= Chemung, Illinois =

- Census-designated place
- Location within Illinois Location within the United States
- Coordinates: 42°24′58″N 88°39′51″W
- Country: United States
- State: Illinois
- County: McHenry
- Townships: Chemung, Dunham

Area
  - Total: 0.28 sq mi (0.73 km^{2})
  - Land: 0.28 sq mi (0.73 km^{2})
  - Water: 0 sq mi (0.00 km^{2})
- Elevation: 899 ft (274 m)

Population (2020)
  - Total: 276
  - Density: 982/sq mi (379.1/km^{2})
- Time zone: UTC-6 (CST)
  - Summer (DST): UTC-5 (CDT)
- ZIP code: 60033
- FIPS code: 17-12879
- GNIS feature ID: 2628545

Chemung, elevation 896 feet (273 meters), is an unincorporated census-designated place in McHenry County, Illinois, United States. Per the 2020 census, the population was 276.

== History ==
A post office called Chemung was established in 1845, and remained in operation until it was discontinued in 1943. The name Chemung is comes from the word in the Seneca language meaning "big horn" after a large horned fossil was discovered in a nearby river.

== Geography ==
The small, unincorporated town is located approximately 3.14 miles west of downtown Harvard, Illinois at the junction of Illinois Route 173, Oak Grove Road (County Highway A-20) and Island Road (the continuation of Oak Grove Road south of Route 173). The town straddles the boundary shared by Chemung Township and Dunham Township. In terms of the Public Land Survey System, Chemung is found in Sections 4 and 5, Township 45 North, Range 5 East; and Sections 32 and 33, Township 46 North, Range 5 East of the Third Principal Meridian. Piscasaw Creek flows along the west side of Chemung in a generally northeast to southwest direction, and a freight branch line of the Union Pacific Railroad traverses the town in an east-northeast to west-southwest direction. Chemung is served by the Harvard post office. Chemung has an area of 0.280 square miles (0.73 km^{2}), all land.

== Demographics ==
Historical population
| Census | Pop. | Note | %± |
|---|---|---|---|
| 2010 | 308 | | — |
| 2020 | 276 | | −10.4% |
U.S. Decennial Census; 2010 2020

Chemung first appeared as a census designated place in the 2010 U.S. census.

=== 2020 census ===
Chemung CDP, Illinois – Racial and ethnic composition Note: the US Census treats Hispanic/Latino as an ethnic category. This table excludes Latinos from the racial categories and assigns them to a separate category. Hispanics/Latinos may be of any race.
| Race / Ethnicity (NH = Non-Hispanic) | Pop 2010 | Pop 2020 | % 2010 | % 2020 |
|---|---|---|---|---|
| White alone (NH) | 241 | 179 | 78.25% | 64.86% |
| Black or African American alone (NH) | 12 | 0 | 3.90% | 0.00% |
| Native American or Alaska Native alone (NH) | 0 | 0 | 0.00% | 0.00% |
| Asian alone (NH) | 0 | 0 | 0.00% | 0.00% |
| Native Hawaiian or Pacific Islander alone (NH) | 0 | 0 | 0.00% | 0.00% |
| Other race alone (NH) | 0 | 1 | 0.00% | 0.36% |
| Mixed race or Multiracial (NH) | 6 | 63 | 0.65% | 2.17% |
| Hispanic or Latino (any race) | 53 | 90 | 17.21% | 32.61% |
| Total | 308 | 276 | 100.00% | 100.00% |

== See also ==
- Chemung Township
- Dunham Township
