= Dunham Township, Illinois =

Coordinates: 42°21′59″N 88°39′08″W

Dunham Township
- Township
- Seal

- Location in McHenry County
- Country: United States
- State: Illinois
- County: McHenry
- Established: November 6, 1849

Area
  - Total: 35.97 sq mi (93.2 km^{2})
  - Land: 35.96 sq mi (93.1 km^{2})
  - Water: 0.01 sq mi (0.026 km^{2}) 0.03%

Population (2010)
  - Estimate (2016): 2,753
  - Density: 79.1/sq mi (30.5/km^{2})
- Time zone: UTC-6 (CST)
  - Summer (DST): UTC-5 (CDT)
- FIPS code: 17-111-21111
- Website: dunhamtownship.com

Dunham Township is located in McHenry County, Illinois, USA. As of the 2010 census, its population was 2,844 and it contained 1,035 housing units. It includes southern portions of Harvard, most of the city being in Chemung Township, and part of the census-designated place of Chemung.

Dunham Township changed its name from Byron Township on December 28, 1850, to avoid confusion with Byron Township and to honor a resident, Solomon J. Dunham.

== Geography ==
According to the 2010 census, the township has a total area of 35.97 square miles (93.2 km^{2}), of which 35.96 square miles (93.1 km^{2}) (or 99.97%) is land and 0.01 square miles (0.026 km^{2}) (or 0.03%) is water.

== Demographics ==
Historical population
Census	Pop.	Note	%±
2016 (est.)	2,753
U.S. Decennial Census
