= George Sykes (Wisconsin politician) =

American politician

George Sykes (sources also spell it Sikes) (December 1816 – November 29, 1881) was an American farmer from Sharon, Wisconsin who held various local elected offices, including a single one-year term in 1850 as a Free Soil Party member of the Wisconsin State Assembly representing part of Walworth County.

== Background ==
Sykes was born in Connecticut in December 1816, and in his childhood moved with his family to the state of New York. In his youth he traveled in the south and west of the United States.

Sykes married Elvira Perkins, a native of Vermont. The two of them moved to Wisconsin Territory in 1843, and settled a quarter-section (160 acres). They improved the land, built a house, and took up general farming and livestock raising. They would eventually have five children: Charles, George R., Clara, Martha and Mary.

== Public office ==
In 1847, Sykes was elected as Assessor for the Town of Sharon; and he was elected once more to that office in 1849. In the same year, he was elected to the General Assembly over one Amos Holder for the district consisting of the Towns of Darien, Linn, Sharon, and Walworth, succeeding fellow Free Soiler George H. Lown. He appears not to have sought re-election, and was succeeded by another Free Soiler, Elijah Easton.

In 1869, he was elected as a "supervisor" (city council member) of the town and again in 1873 through 1878.

== Later life ==
In the late 1870s the Sykes' gave up active farming and moved into the Village of Sharon. George died November 29, 1881; Elvira would live until 1906.
