= Big Foot (Potawatomi leader) =

Potawatomi leader

Big Foot (Potawatomi: Maungeezik, meaning “Big Foot”) was a leader of the Prairie Band of Potawatomi on Kishwauketoe (today Geneva Lake) in what would become the U.S. State of Wisconsin.

Big Foot likely led his band in the Battle of Fort Dearborn in Chicago, part of the War of 1812, in which a Potawatomi war band killed 38 American soldiers, 14 civilians, captured dozens more, and burned Fort Dearborn to the ground. Following the War of 1812, the United States regularly sent agents to Geneva Lake to spy on Big Foot, including the Odawa leader Shabbona and the British-Potawatomi fur trader Billy Caldwell, which interfered with Big Foot's plans to make further war against the United States. He spent several decades preparing for further hostilities against the United States that never materialized.

Following encroachment on their land by a fast-growing number American settlers, especially after the establishment of new lead mines on the Galena River, in 1828, Big Foot traveled to Green Bay, along with Ho-Chunk, Ojibwe, Odawa, and other Potawatomi leaders, to negotiate and sign a treaty with the United States establishing a temporary border between the territories of their bands and the United States through what is now Wisconsin and Illinois.

After the Potawatomi's defeat in the Black Hawk War of 1832, in which Big Foot did not participate, he negotiated and signed the 1833 Treaty of Chicago, trading much of southeastern Wisconsin and northeastern Illinois to the United States. Under the treaty, the United States forcibly removed Big Foot and the Potawatomi band from Geneva Lake to the Platte River in Missouri and later to Lawrence, Kansas.

Several modern locations around Geneva Lake bear Big Foot's name, including the community of Big Foot Prairie in Wisconsin and Illinois, Big Foot Beach State Park in Lake Geneva, Wisconsin, Big Foot High School in Walworth, Wisconsin, Big Foot Country Club in Fontana-on-Geneva Lake, Wisconsin, and The Big Foot Inn in Harvard, IL. The original settler name for Geneva Lake in Wisconsin was Big Foot Lake.
