= Big Foot Prairie, Illinois =

- Census-designated place
- Location within Illinois Location within the United States
- Coordinates: 42°29′29″N 88°36′03″W
- Country: United States
- State: Illinois
- County: McHenry
- Township: Chemung

Area
  - Total: 0.22 sq mi (0.58 km^{2})
  - Land: 0.22 sq mi (0.58 km^{2})
  - Water: 0 sq mi (0.00 km^{2})
- Elevation: 955 ft (291 m)

Population (2020)
  - Total: 65
  - Density: 290.6/sq mi (112.22/km^{2})
- Time zone: UTC-6 (Central (CST))
  - Summer (DST): UTC-5 (CDT)
- ZIP Code: 60033 (Harvard)
- Area codes: 815 & 779
- FIPS code: 17-05859
- GNIS feature ID: 2806454

Big Foot Prairie is an unincorporated community and census-designated place in McHenry County, Illinois, United States. It was named a CDP for the 2020 census, at which time it had a population of 65. It is located in Chemung Township. Big Foot Prairie is located on U.S. Route 14, 5 miles (8.0 km) north of Harvard. The community extends north into Walworth County, Wisconsin, where there is a CDP of the same name in the town of Walworth.

== History ==
The community is named for Big Foot, a Potawatomi leader who resided on nearby Kishwauketoe (today Geneva Lake in Wisconsin) until his band was forcibly removed by the United States in 1836. It once had a post office, which opened on May 15, 1848.

== Demographics ==
Historical population
| Census | Pop. | Note | %± |
|---|---|---|---|
| 2020 | 65 | | — |
U.S. Decennial Census; 2020

Big Foot Prairie first appeared as a census designated place in the 2020 United States census.

Big Foot Prairie CDP, Illinois – Racial and ethnic composition Note: the US Census treats Hispanic/Latino as an ethnic category. This table excludes Latinos from the racial categories and assigns them to a separate category. Hispanics/Latinos may be of any race.
| Race / Ethnicity (NH = Non-Hispanic) | Pop 2020 | % 2020 |
|---|---|---|
| White alone (NH) | 28 | 43.08% |
| Black or African American alone (NH) | 0 | 0.00% |
| Native American or Alaska Native alone (NH) | 0 | 0.00% |
| Asian alone (NH) | 1 | 1.54% |
| Native Hawaiian or Pacific Islander alone (NH) | 0 | 0.00% |
| Other race alone (NH) | 1 | 0.88% |
| Mixed race or Multiracial (NH) | 2 | 3.08% |
| Hispanic or Latino (any race) | 34 | 52.31% |
| Total | 65 | 100.00% |
