= Big Foot Beach State Park =

State park in Walworth County, Wisconsin

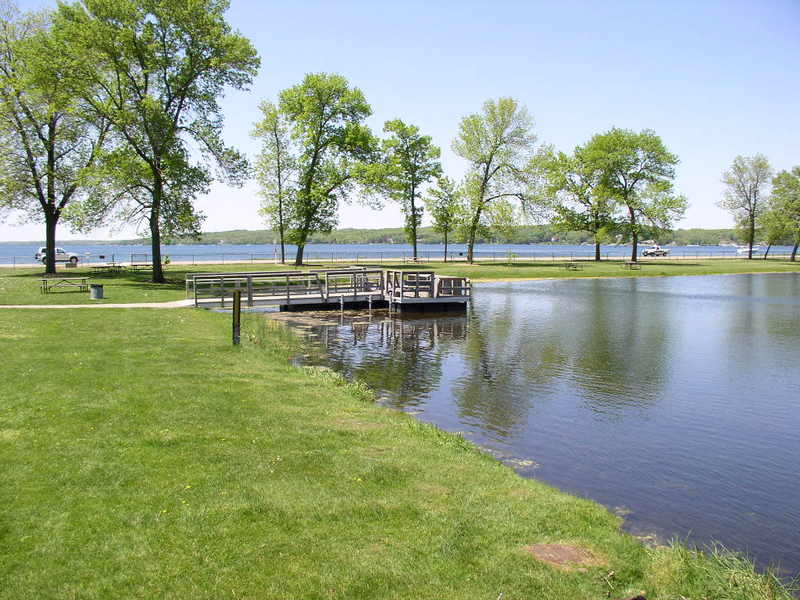

- Location within Wisconsin Location within the United States
- Interactive map of Big Foot Beach State Park
- Location: Walworth County, Wisconsin, United States
- Coordinates: 42°34′8″N 88°25′36″W
- Area: 272 acres (110 ha)
- Established: 1949
- Administrator: Wisconsin Department of Natural Resources
- Named for: Potawatomi leader Big Foot
- Website: Official website
- Wisconsin State Parks

Big Foot Beach State Park is a state park of Wisconsin, United States, on Geneva Lake. The park is used primarily for hiking, swimming, camping, and fishing.

== History ==
The beach and park are named for Big Foot (a translation from the Potawatomi Maumksuck (Mmangzed), also known in French as Gros Pied), an early Potawatomi leader in the area until his band forcibly relocated by the United States in 1836. Big Foot Lake was the original English name of Geneva Lake.
