= The Riviera (Lake Geneva, Wisconsin) =

- U.S. National Register of Historic Places
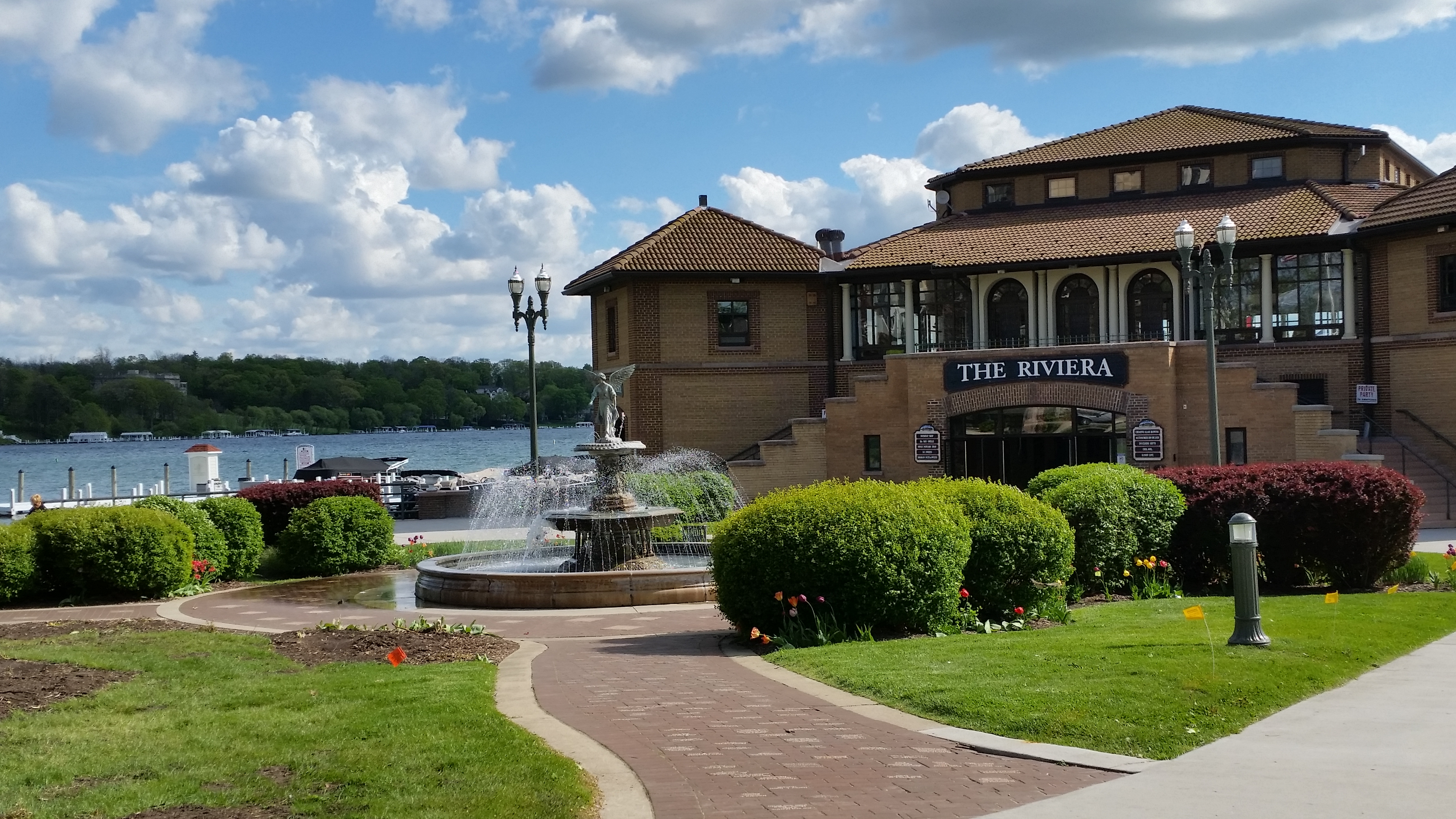

- Location within Wisconsin Location within the United States
- Location: 810 Wrigley Drive, Lake Geneva, Wisconsin, U.S.
- Coordinates: 42°35′24″N 88°26′11″W
- Area: less than one acre
- Built: 1932
- Architect: James Roy Allen
- Architectural style: Italian Renaissance
- NRHP reference No.: 86000616
- Added to NRHP: April 3, 1986

The Riviera is a marina and mixed-use meeting hall at the shore of Geneva Lake in Lake Geneva, Wisconsin, United States. Riviera Beach is an adjacent daily admission beach.

== History ==
Lake Geneva, Wisconsin, emerged as a resort town in the 1870s, popularized by images of its side-wheeler steamboats. The lakeshore at Broad Street became the main water transportation hub with the construction of the Whiting House Hotel; the train station was located approximately .5 miles due north on Broad St. Until 1910, when a road circling the lake opened, boat travel was the only practical mode of transportation around Geneva Lake. Starting in 1912, the United States Postal Service began summertime mail delivery from this point. By the 1930s, residents felt the need for a new recreational facility at this location. Despite the ongoing Great Depression, residents approved an $85,000 bond issue to raise funds for construction.

A small island was created by building a rubble mound and allowing sediment to build up. To improve the stability of the structure, 280 piles were driven into the bedrock below. The first pile was put in place on March 29, 1932, and the entire building was completed in time for a dance on September 1 later that year. Local architect James Roy Allen was selected to design the building. The total cost was only $55,000. In 1980, the building was rehabilitated by local architect Daniel Curran. As the "most intact historic building associated with transportation in the Geneva Lake area," the Riviera was listed on the National Register of Historic Places by the National Park Service on April 3, 1986.

From the 1930s to the 1950s, the Riviera ballroom hosted such renowned swing and jazz bandleaders as Benny Goodman, Glenn Miller, Duke Ellington, Louis Armstrong, Tommy Dorsey, Gene Krupa, Dave Brubeck, Artie Shaw, Xavier Cugat, Les Brown, Louis Prima, Cab Calloway, Ted Weems, Chick Webb, Vincent Lopez, Count Basie, Lawrence Welk, Lionel Hampton, Harry James and Jimmy Dorsey. Vocalists who performed at the Riviera during these years included Frank Sinatra, Ella Fitzgerald, Doris Day, Peggy Lee, Dean Martin, Perry Como, Sarah Vaughan, Billie Holiday, Mel Torme, Lena Horne, Anita O'Day, Nat King Cole, Dinah Washington, Eartha Kitt, The Andrews Sisters, Keely Smith, Betty Hutton and Abbe Lane.

In 1972, the Riviera ballroom rebranded itself as a nightclub called Top Deck, and remained open as such until 1979. Artists who performed at Top Deck included Donna Summer, Chubby Checker, Herman's Hermits, Gary Puckett & the Union Gap, Gloria Gaynor, Chaka Khan, Sylvester, Loleatta Holloway, The Village People, Thelma Houston, Vicki Sue Robinson, Linda Clifford, Dan Hartman, France Joli, The Ritchie Family and The Three Degrees.
