= Carlos L. Douglass =

American politician

Carlos Lavalette Douglass (November 7, 1827 – January 6, 1898) was an American politician, farmer, and flour manufacturer.

Douglass was born in Cattaraugus County, New York and went to the public schools. He moved with his family to Michigan. In 1837, Douglass moved with his family to the town of Walworth, Walworth County, Wisconsin Territory. Douglass was a farmer and flour manufacturer. He served on the Walworth County Board of Supervisors and as chairman of the Walworth Town Board. Douglass served a single one-year term as a Republican in the Wisconsin State Assembly in 1873. Douglass died at his home in the town of Walworth, Wisconsin.
