= Main Street Historic District (Lake Geneva, Wisconsin) =

Historic district in Wisconsin, United States

- U.S. National Register of Historic Places
- U.S. Historic district
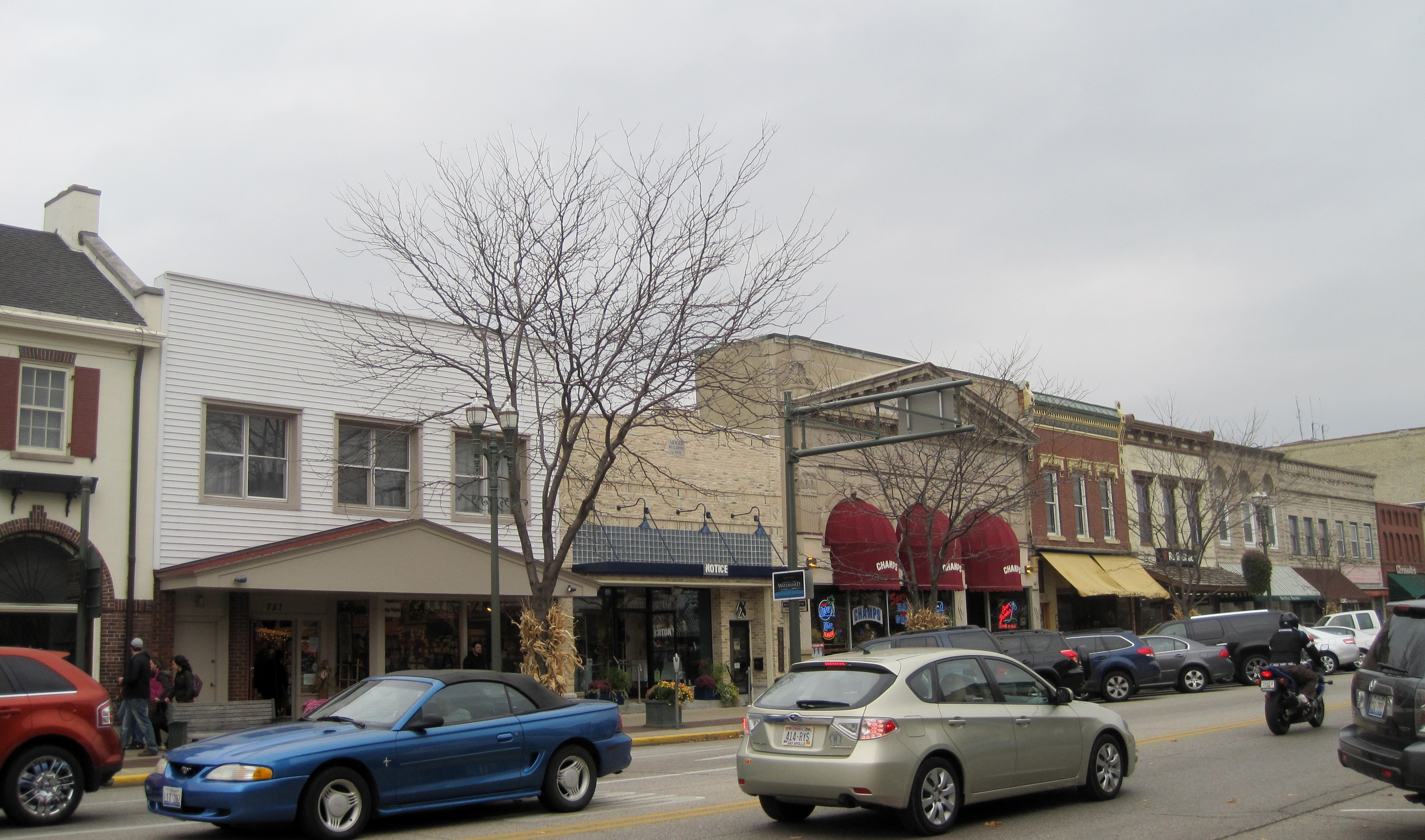

- Location within Wisconsin Location within the United States
- Location: Roughly Main St., from Center St. to Broad St., Lake Geneva, Wisconsin
- Coordinates: 42°35′30″N 88°26′4″W
- Area: 2.5 acres (1.0 ha)
- Architect: VonHolst, H.V.; and others
- Architectural style: Italianate, Classical Revival, et al.
- NRHP reference No.: 01001453 (original); 02000188 (increase)

Significant dates
- Added to NRHP: January 11, 2002
- Boundary increase: March 5, 2002

The Main Street Historic District in Lake Geneva, Wisconsin is a 2.5-acre (1.0 ha) historic district that was listed on the National Register of Historic Places on January 11, 2002. The listing was amended in some way in a revised listing on March 5, 2002. In 2002, there were 20 buildings in the district that were deemed to contribute to its historic character.

The district consists of most of the buildings in the 700 block of Main Street, and is drawn to exclude non-historic buildings. Contributing buildings include, in order built:

- The Hanna Block at 711 Main St is a 2-story commercial building built in 1871, in Italianate style, with three second-floor windows framed by brick pilasters and round arches. The Hannas operated a cabinet shop which grew into a furniture store and undertaking business.
- The Walker Block at 701-709 Main St is a 3-story brick commercial building built in 1872. It initially housed Austin Walker's general store, Ferguson's dry goods, and Buhre's jewelry store. Upstairs on the third floor was a meeting room called Walker's Hall.
- The Metropolitan Block at 770 Main St is a 3-story commercial block designed by William Le Baron Jenney of Chicago and built in 1874. Its style is a sophisticated Italianate, with Racine pressed brick of different colors, almost hinting of Neoclassical. The building initially housed H.H. Curtis' drug store, a harness shop, a barber shop, a doctor's office, the Geneva Herald newspaper, and a 150-seat lecture hall. It was the premier commercial block in Lake Geneva in the late 19th and early 20th centuries.
- The Wachter and Ford Block, also called the Emporium Block, at 736-738 Main St. is a 2-story brick block constructed in 1881-82 in Victorian Italianate style. The iron columns and general design of the street-level storefront are largely intact. Wachter and Ford ran a large dry goods business. By 1900 the building was housing the Farmer's National Bank and Host Brothers Meat Market.
- The Bank of Geneva at 704 Main St is also called the Seymour Block. Its front Italianate section was constructed in 1883, a double-storefront built of cream brick and topped with an elaborate cornice. It was built by E.D. Richardson. His Bank of Geneva initially occupied the east storefront and an express office occupied the west. When E.D. died in 1892, the bank was found to be insolvent, and Henry Rogers' jewelry store rented the bank's space. John Seymour bought the building around 1900 and added a rear section in Classical Revival style around 1907.
- The Hammersley Block at 741 Main St is a 2-story commercial vernacular-style store built in 1885, with a red brick front and a pressed metal cornice. The original street-level storefront was replaced in 1929 with a "modern" one of copper and glass from Brasco Manufacturing of Chicago. W.H. Hammersley ran his drug store in the building until 1905, and successive generations of Hammersleys ran the drug store until the 1980s.
- The Frank Moore Block at 731 Main St was built in 1903, a 2-story commercial vernacular building with Classical Revival details. The front is faced in Bedford limestone. The second-story windows are topped with round-arched transoms. Moore constructed the building for his hardware store.
- The Stannard-Chelini Block at 725-729 Main St is a double-store built for two different owners in 1908 and 1909. The walls are rusticated concrete blocks, topped with a simple classical cornice. Initially, George Stannard ran a barber shop in the west store, and Barney Chelini ran a confectionary and ice cream parlor in the east. During the 20s and 30s, the National Tea Company opened a grocery store in the building. By the 1960s it was a Ben Franklin store. The original street-level storefront was probably replaced with the stainless steel one by one of these later owners.
- The Wisconsin Power and Light Company Building is a Colonial Revival-styled office building, with the street-level clad in red brick and the upper two stories in stucco. The entry is under a large round arches holding a wrought iron fanlight. The building contained offices, a showroom for appliances, a model laundry, and a room for demonstrations, cooking lessons, and meetings. The building was designed by H.V. VonHolst and built 1929-30 by T.S. Willis.
