= Margaret H. Bair =

US Air Force general

- Allegiance: United States
- Branch: Air National Guard
- Rank: Brigadier General
- Commands: United States Air Force Reserve; Montana Air National Guard; 128th Air Refueling Wing; Wisconsin Air National Guard

Margaret H. Bair is a retired brigadier general in the United States Air National Guard and was the Chief of Staff of the Wisconsin Air National Guard.

== Biography ==
She has three children. While not serving in the military she works as a registered nurse in Lake Geneva, Wisconsin.

== Career ==
Bair originally joined the United States Air Force in 1976. While on active duty, her assignments included serving at Andrews Air Force Base. Following her time on active duty, she joined the United States Air Force Reserve and the Montana Air National Guard and eventually became the commander of the Medical Group of the 128th Air Refueling Wing of the Wisconsin Air National Guard. She was promoted to Brigadier General in 2009 by Jim Doyle and was the first woman in the Wisconsin Air National Guard to be promoted to that rank.

After 32 years, Bair retired from the Wisconsin Air National Guard in September 2012.
