= Joseph S. Maxon =

American politician

Joseph S. Maxon was an American politician who served as a member of the Wisconsin State Assembly.

== Biography ==
Maxon was born on November 23, 1838, in Adams, New York. In 1853, he moved to the town of Walworth, Wisconsin. He became a physician by trade.

== Assembly career ==
Maxon was elected to the Assembly in 1890. He was a Republican.
