= Leonard C. Church =

American politician

Leonard Cyrus Church (January 31, 1846 – December 7, 1915) was an American businessman, farmer, and politician.

Church was born in the town of Walworth, Walworth County, Wisconsin and went to the public schools and to Allen's Grove Academy in Allen's Grove, Wisconsin. Church served in the 3rd Wisconsin Volunteer Cavalry Regiment, Company L during the American Civil War. He was a dairy farmer and cattle dealer. Church was also involved in the banking and lumber business. Church served the Walworth County treasurer and was a Republican. He served in the Wisconsin Assembly in 1897 and 1898. Church died at the Sacred Heart Sanitarium in Milwaukee, Wisconsin from a heart ailment.
