= White River State Trail =

Rail trail in Wisconsin, United States

- Length: 19 miles (31 km)
- Location: Wisconsin, United States
- Surface: crushed limestone
- Website: dnr.wisconsin.gov/topic/parks/whiteriver

The White River State Trail is a 19-mile state designated rail trail in Racine and Walworth Counties in Wisconsin.

== Route ==
The trail follows a former rail corridor between Elkhorn, Wisconsin and Dover, Wisconsin. The trail begins at County Highway H in Elkhorn, Wisconsin (42°39′36″N 88°31′19″W), and travels east to Vandenboom Road in Dover, Wisconsin (42°40′51″N 88°07′47″W). The trail is 19 miles long, with a two-mile gap in Burlington, Wisconsin. The trail is made of crushed limestone. Despite its name, the trail does not parallel the White River. It is actually the right of way of the old Milwaukee Road Racine & Southwestern line.

== Access ==
The trail is open to walkers, joggers, bicyclists in the summer, and snowmobiling, cross-country skiing, and snowshoeing in the winter.

The trail is free to walk or run, but a trail pass must be purchased in order to bike the trail, which may be purchased at several self-registration stations along the trail.
