= Edwin A. Williams =

American politician

Edwin A. Williams (November 9, 1847 – December 14, 1920) was an American educator, businessman, and politician.

Born in Lake Geneva, Walworth County, Wisconsin, Williams worked on the family farm. He went to Hillsdale College, University of Michigan, and then graduated from Platteville Normal School (now University of Wisconsin–Platteville). He taught school in Winneconne, Wisconsin, Oshkosh, Wisconsin, and Menasha, Wisconsin, In 1888, Williams moved to Neenah, Wisconsin where he worked in the real estate and insurance business. In 1894, Williams was elected mayor of Neenah. Williams served in the Wisconsin State Assembly, in 1901, and was a Republican. Williams helped founded the Equitable Fraternal Union and was the president. Williams died at his home of a heart ailment.
