= WLKG =

- Lake Geneva, Wisconsin; United States
- Broadcast area: Walworth, Kenosha and Racine counties McHenry County, Illinois
- Frequency: 96.1 MHz
- Branding: Lake 96.1

Programming
- Format: Hot adult contemporary

Ownership
- Owner: CTJ Communications, Ltd.

History
- First air date: June 6, 1994; 31 years ago
- Former call signs: WAEM (1993–1994, CP)
- Call sign meaning: W-LaKe Geneva

Technical information
- Licensing authority: FCC
- Facility ID: 67290
- Class: A
- ERP: 6,000 watts
- HAAT: 100 meters
- Transmitter coordinates: 42°36′34.00″N 88°26′36.00″W

Links
- Public license information: Public file; LMS
- Webcast: Listen Live
- Website: lake961.com

WLKG (96.1 FM, "Lake 96.1") is a radio station broadcasting a hot adult contemporary music radio format. Licensed to Lake Geneva, Wisconsin, United States, the station serves Walworth, western Kenosha and Racine counties, along with McHenry County, Illinois. The station is currently owned by CTJ Communications, Ltd.

== History ==
The station was assigned call sign WLKG and signed on June 6, 1994.
