= List of mayors of Harvard, Illinois =

This is a list of mayors of Harvard, Illinois:

Nathan B Helm	1891–1893	2 years
M.W. Lake	1893–1895	2 years
Levi Addison Gardner	1895–1896	1 year
James Logue	1896–1899	3 years
J.A. Sweeney	1899–1901	2 years
William D. Hall	1901–1903	2 years
Richard Phalen	1903–1907	4 years
J.H. Vickers	1907–1915	8 years
C.J. Henricks	1915–1918	3 years
Frank O. Thompson	1918–1919	1 year
B.F. Manley	1919–1921	2 years
J.G. Maxon	1921–1927	6 years
Frank O. Thompson	1927–1929	2 years
J.G. Maxon	1929–1940	11 years
M. Falkowitz	1940–1941 (interim)	1 year
R.L. Herrick	1941–1946	5 years
John L. McCabe	1947–1957	10 years
Ronald J. Morris	1957–1973	16 years
William R. LeFew	1973–1981	8 years
Frank Godo	1981–1989	8 years
Robert C. Iftner	1989–1993	4 years
William W. LeFew	1993–1996	3 years
Ralph Henning	1996–2005	9 years
Jay T. Nolan	2005–2016	11 years
Michael P. Kelly	2016–present	
