= Ollie Anderson =

American baseball umpire (1879–1945)

- Born: Ollie Otis Anderson; November 16, 1879; Harvard, Illinois, U.S.
- Died: July 7, 1945 (aged 65); Los Angeles, California, U.S.
- Occupation: Umpire
- Years active: 1903-1942

Oliver Otis Anderson (November 16, 1879 – July 7, 1945) was an American professional baseball umpire.

Anderson played Minor League Baseball from 1897 to 1902. After his playing days, he became an umpire for the Northern League from 1903 to 1905. Anderson then umpired for the Ohio League, Western League, New York State League and American Association until 1914 when he worked his only season in the Federal League. In 1914, he umpired 152 games, 81 of them as the Home Plate umpire. Following his only season at the Major League level, he worked many years in the minors until his retirement in 1942. He died in Los Angeles, California on July 7th, 1945. He was 65 years old.
