= White River (Wisconsin) =

Location
- Country: United States
- State: Wisconsin

Physical characteristics
- Source: Geneva Lake
  - location: Lake Geneva, Wisconsin
  - coordinates: 42°35′24″N 88°26′06″W
- Mouth: Fox River
  - location: Burlington, Wisconsin
  - coordinates: 42°40′50″N 88°16′22″W
- Length: 18.62 mi (30.0 km)

The White River is a freshwater tributary located in the counties of Racine and Walworth, Wisconsin, that flows for 18.62 miles (30.0 km) out of Geneva Lake in Lake Geneva to the Fox River in Burlington.

The river flows through the 200-acre White River Park, which is managed by the Geneva Lake Conservancy and Walworth County Park System. The remains of a dam from the 19th century are visible on Sheridan Springs Road where it crosses the river entering Lyons, Wisconsin from the west. This formed a mill pond that is still shown on maps today even though it was drained several decades ago.

The White River is a destination for kayakers and canoers as it offers a range of ripples with a sand and pebble bottom and clear water. There is a section with class II rapids emptying into a relatively large, deep pool that is popular with paddlers looking to cool off in the hot summer months. The river is best in the spring when water levels are higher as these levels decrease into the late summer months unless rainfall is high. Paddlers choosing to finish the river will enter into Echo Lake in Burlington.

== See also ==
- White River State Trail
