= Fontana-on-Geneva Lake, Wisconsin =

- Village
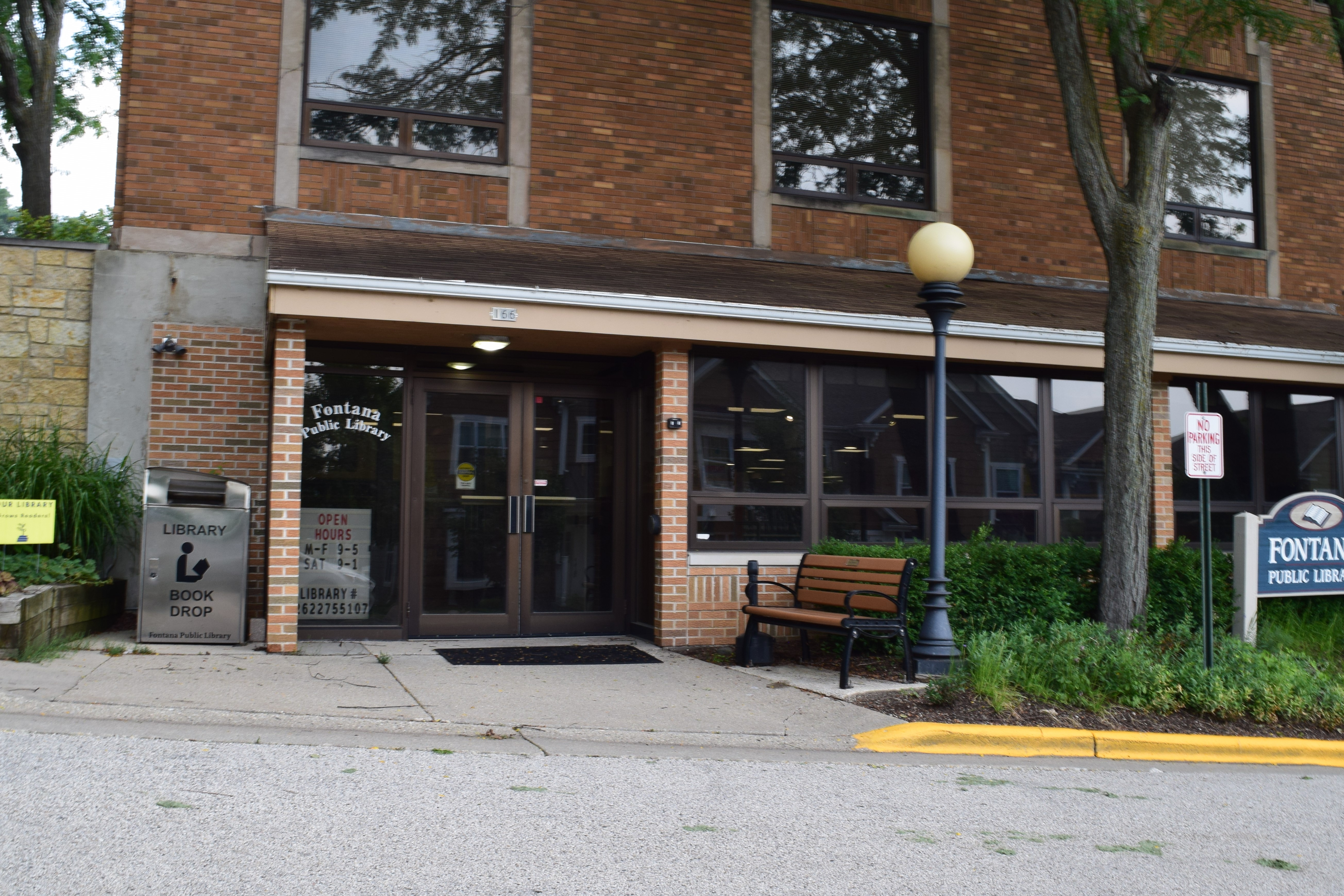
- Fontana Public Library
- Nickname: "Fontana"
- Location of Fontana-on-Geneva Lake in Walworth County, Wisconsin.
- Coordinates: 42°32′39″N 88°33′58″W
- Country: United States
- State: Wisconsin
- County: Walworth

Area
  - Total: 3.39 sq mi (8.77 km^{2})
  - Land: 3.35 sq mi (8.67 km^{2})
  - Water: 0.039 sq mi (0.10 km^{2})

Population (2020)
  - Total: 3,120
  - Density: 519.9/sq mi (200.73/km^{2})
- Time zone: UTC-6 (Central (CST))
  - Summer (DST): UTC-5 (CDT)
- ZIP Code: 53125
- Area code: 262
- FIPS code: 55-26350
- Website: vi.fontana.wi.gov

Fontana-on-Geneva Lake (locally known as "Fontana") is a village located on Geneva Lake in Walworth County, Wisconsin, United States. The population was 3,120 at the 2020 census.

== Geography ==
Fontana-on-Geneva Lake is located at 42°32′39″N 88°33′58″W (42.544288, −88.566010).

According to the United States Census Bureau, the village has a total area of 3.39 square miles (8.78 km^{2}), of which 3.35 square miles (8.68 km^{2}) is land and 0.04 square miles (0.10 km^{2}) is water.

== Demographics ==
Historical population
Census	Pop.	Note	%±
1930	385		—
1940	461		19.7%
1950	726		57.5%
1960	1,326		82.6%
1970	1,464		10.4%
1980	1,764		20.5%
1990	1,635		−7.3%
2000	1,754		7.3%
2010	1,672		−4.7%
2020	3,120		86.6%

=== 2010 census ===
As of the census of 2010, there were 1,672 people, 732 households, and 491 families living in the village. The population density was 499.1 inhabitants per square mile (192.7/km^{2}). There were 2,308 housing units at an average density of 689.0 per square mile (266.0/km^{2}). The racial makeup of the village was 97.9% White, 0.1% Native American, 0.7% Asian, 0.8% from other races, and 0.5% from two or more races. Hispanic or Latino of any race were 2.1% of the population.

There were 732 households, of which 23.1% had children under the age of 18 living with them, 59.4% were married couples living together, 5.2% had a female householder with no husband present, 2.5% had a male householder with no wife present, and 32.9% were non-families. 29.1% of all households were made up of individuals, and 13.8% had someone living alone who was 65 years of age or older. The average household size was 2.28 and the average family size was 2.82.

The median age in the village was 50.6 years. 19.1% of residents were under the age of 18; 5.5% were between the ages of 18 and 24; 15.6% were from 25 to 44; 36.7% were from 45 to 64; and 22.9% were 65 years of age or older. The gender makeup of the village was 48.1% male and 51.9% female.

=== 2000 census ===
As of the census of 2000, there were 1,754 people, 764 households, and 524 families living in the village. The population density was 592.0 people per square mile (228.8/km^{2}). There were 1,974 housing units at an average density of 666.3 per square mile (257.5/km^{2}). The racial makeup of the village was 98.23% White, 0.40% African American, 0.86% Asian, 0.40% from other races, and 0.11% from two or more races. Hispanic or Latino of any race were 1.08% of the population.

There were 764 households, out of which 22.8% had children under the age of 18 living with them, 60.7% were married couples living together, 5.1% had a female householder with no husband present, and 31.3% were non-families. 27.1% of all households were made up of individuals, and 11.1% had someone living alone who was 65 years of age or older. The average household size was 2.30 and the average family size was 2.79.

In the village, the population was spread out, with 20.1% under the age of 18, 4.8% from 18 to 24, 24.2% from 25 to 44, 30.6% from 45 to 64, and 20.2% who were 65 years of age or older. The median age was 46 years. For every 100 females, there were 99.8 males. For every 100 females age 18 and over, there were 98.4 males.

The median income for a household in the village was $54,211, and the median income for a family was $63,594. Males had a median income of $41,750 versus $31,813 for females. The per capita income for the village was $32,266. About 2.4% of families and 3.8% of the population were below the poverty line, including 3.8% of those under age 18 and 3.0% of those age 65 or over.

== Recreation ==
- The Abbey Resort
- Lake Geneva Yacht Club
