= Walworth (town), Wisconsin =

Town in Walworth County, Wisconsin

Walworth, Wisconsin
- Town
- Town of Walworth
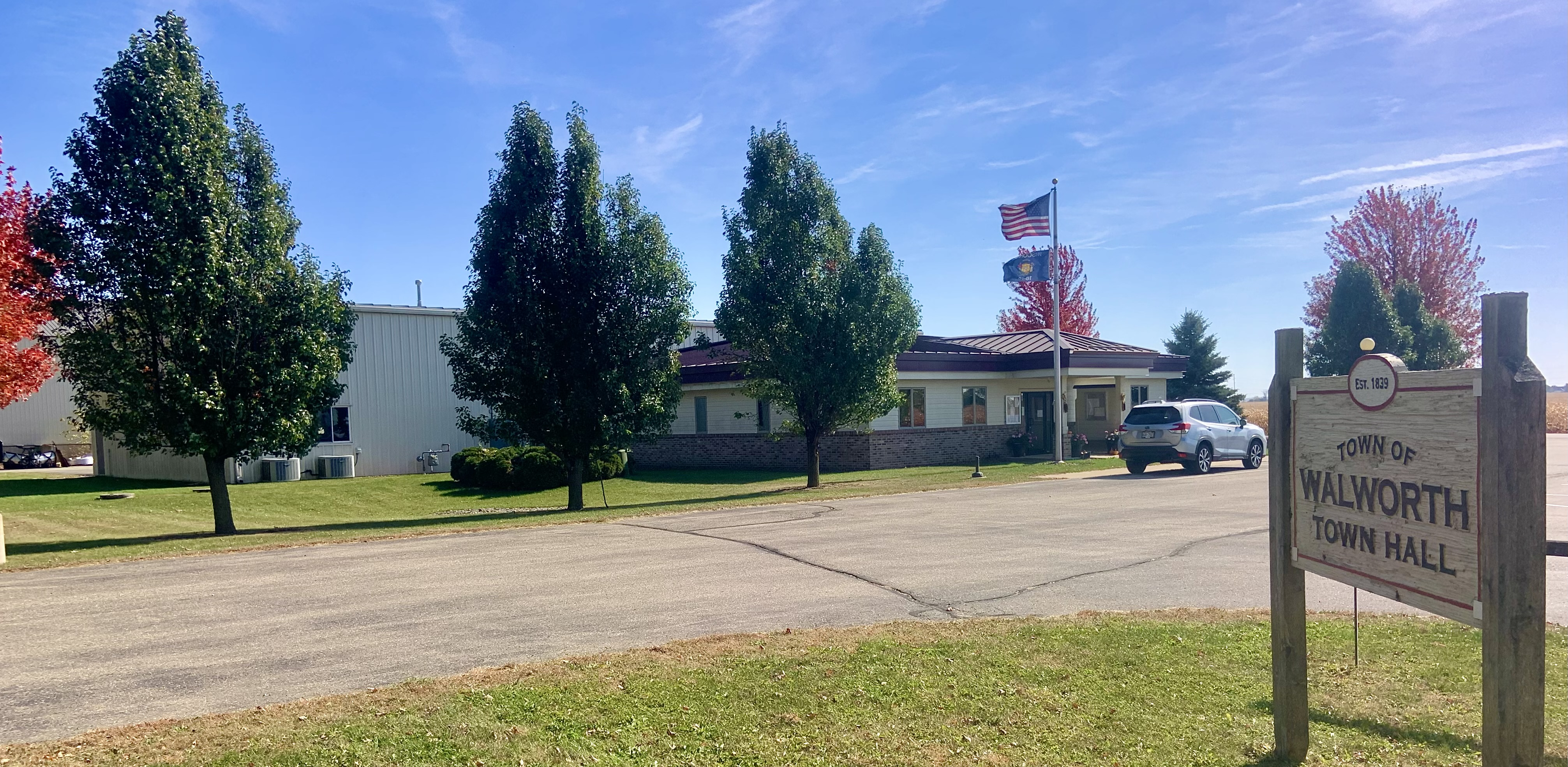
- Walworth Town Hall

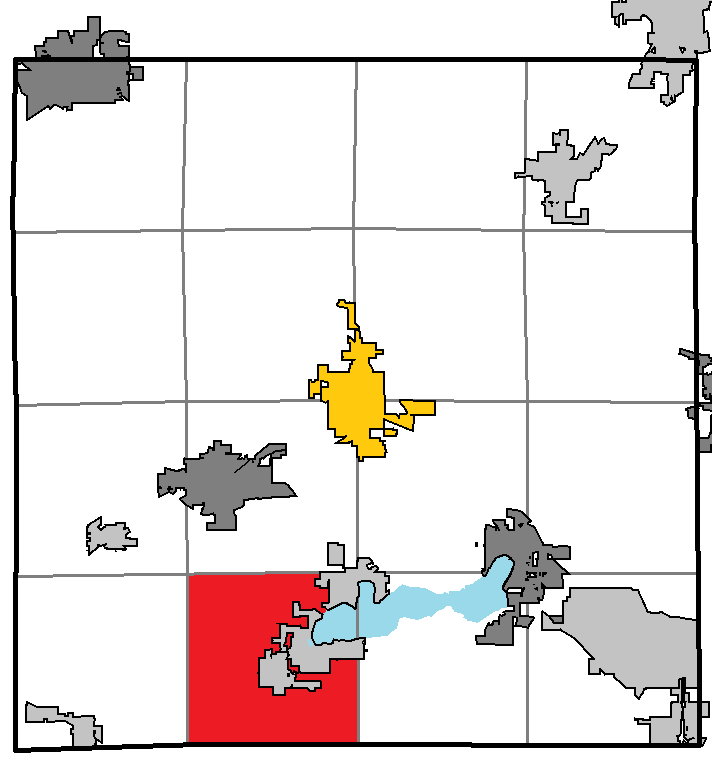
- Location of Walworth, within Walworth County

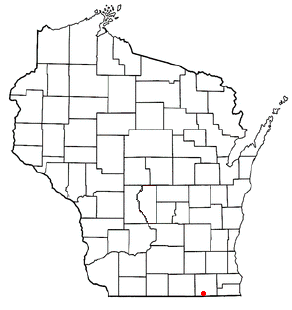
- Location of Walworth, Wisconsin
- Coordinates: 42°34′05″N 88°37′44″W
- Country: United States
- State: Wisconsin
- County: Walworth

Area
  - Total: 30.02 sq mi (77.8 km^{2})
  - Land: 28.11 sq mi (72.8 km^{2})
  - Water: 1.90 sq mi (4.9 km^{2})

Population (2020)
  - Total: 1,565
  - Density: 55.67/sq mi (21.50/km^{2})
- Time zone: UTC-6 (Central (CST))
  - Summer (DST): UTC-5 (CDT)
- Area code: 262
- GNIS feature ID: 1584343

Walworth is a town in Walworth County, Wisconsin, United States. The population was 1,565 at the 2020 census. The Village of Walworth is located within the town. The unincorporated communities of Big Foot Prairie and Delavan Lake are also located partially in the town.

== History ==
The first town meeting was held for what was originally called "Fontana" (later renamed "Walworth"), in a schoolhouse on Big Foot Prairie on April 4, 1843. George H. Lown was elected as Chairman of the "Supervisors". Also elected were two assistants to Lown (listed as Supervisors, but also as "assistants"); a Clerk; a Treasurer; three School Commissioners; three Highway Commissioners; an Assessor; a Collector; three Constables; and a Moderator. The meeting voted to raise for incidental expenses, $60; for relief of the poor, $20; for the support of schools, $100; and for the relief of poor citizens named in the records, a special tax of $30.75.

== Geography ==
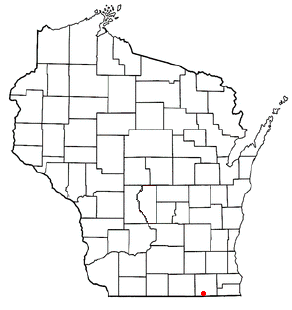
Location of Walworth (town), Wisconsin

According to the United States Census Bureau, the town has a total area of 29.5 square miles (76.4 km^{2}), of which 28.9 square miles (74.9 km^{2}) is land and 0.6 square mile (1.6 km^{2}) (2.07%) is water.

== Demographics ==
As of the census of 2000, there were 1,676 people, 529 households, and 433 families residing in the town. The population density was 58.0 people per square mile (22.4/km^{2}). There were 586 housing units at an average density of 20.3 per square mile (7.8/km^{2}). The racial makeup of the town was 98.39% White, 0.24% Black or African American, 0.06% Native American, 0.06% Asian, 0.54% from other races, and 0.72% from two or more races. 2.51% of the population were Hispanic or Latino of any race.

There were 529 households, out of which 35.9% had children under the age of 18 living with them, 72.4% were married couples living together, 6.2% had a female householder with no husband present, and 18.1% were non-families. 14.4% of all households were made up of individuals, and 5.1% had someone living alone who was 65 years of age or older. The average household size was 2.86 and the average family size was 3.14.

In the town, the population was spread out, with 24.6% under the age of 18, 6.5% from 18 to 24, 25.8% from 25 to 44, 26.8% from 45 to 64, and 16.2% who were 65 years of age or older. The median age was 41 years. For every 100 females, there were 97.2 males. For every 100 females age 18 and over, there were 92.2 males.

The median income for a household in the town was $56,250, and the median income for a family was $60,938. Males had a median income of $39,438 versus $24,934 for females. The per capita income for the town was $24,817. About 3.3% of families and 8.0% of the population were below the poverty line, including 4.4% of those under age 18 and 8.7% of those age 65 or over.

== Notable people ==
- Leonard C. Church, farmer, businessman, and Wisconsin State Representative was born on a farm in the town
- Carlos L. Douglass, farmer, businessman, and Wisconsin State Representative, lived in town
- Phipps W. Lake, Free Will Baptist minister and Wisconsin State Representative, lived in the town in Big Foot Prairie
- Frank E. Lawson, Wisconsin State Representative, was town clerk of the town
- Joseph S. Maxon, Wisconsin State Representative, lived in the town
- Alvin S. Trow, Wisconsin State Representative, was born in what would become the town
