= Chemung Township, Illinois =

Coordinates: 42°27′16″N 88°39′14″W

Chemung Township
- Township
- Location in McHenry County
- Country: United States
- State: Illinois
- County: McHenry
- Established: November 6, 1849

Area
  - Total: 32.97 sq mi (85.4 km^{2})
  - Land: 32.97 sq mi (85.4 km^{2})
  - Water: 0 sq mi (0 km^{2}) 0%

Population (2020)
  - Total: 9,095
  - Density: 277/sq mi (107/km^{2})
- Time zone: UTC-6 (CST)
  - Summer (DST): UTC-5 (CDT)
- FIPS code: 17-111-12892
- Website: https://chemungtownshipil.gov/index

Chemung Township is the northwesternmost township of McHenry County, Illinois, United States.

It includes the bulk and northern part of the city of Harvard, as well as unincorporated communities: Big Foot Prairie (partly in Wisconsin), Lawrence, and Chemung.

As of the 2020 census, its population was 9,035 and it contained 3,294 housing units.

== Geography ==
According to the 2010 census, the township has a total area of 32.97 square miles (85.4 km^{2}), all land.

== Demographics ==
Historical population
Census	Pop.	Note	%±
2010	9,134		—
2020	9,095		−0.4%
U.S. Decennial Census
