= Lake Geneva, Wisconsin =

- City
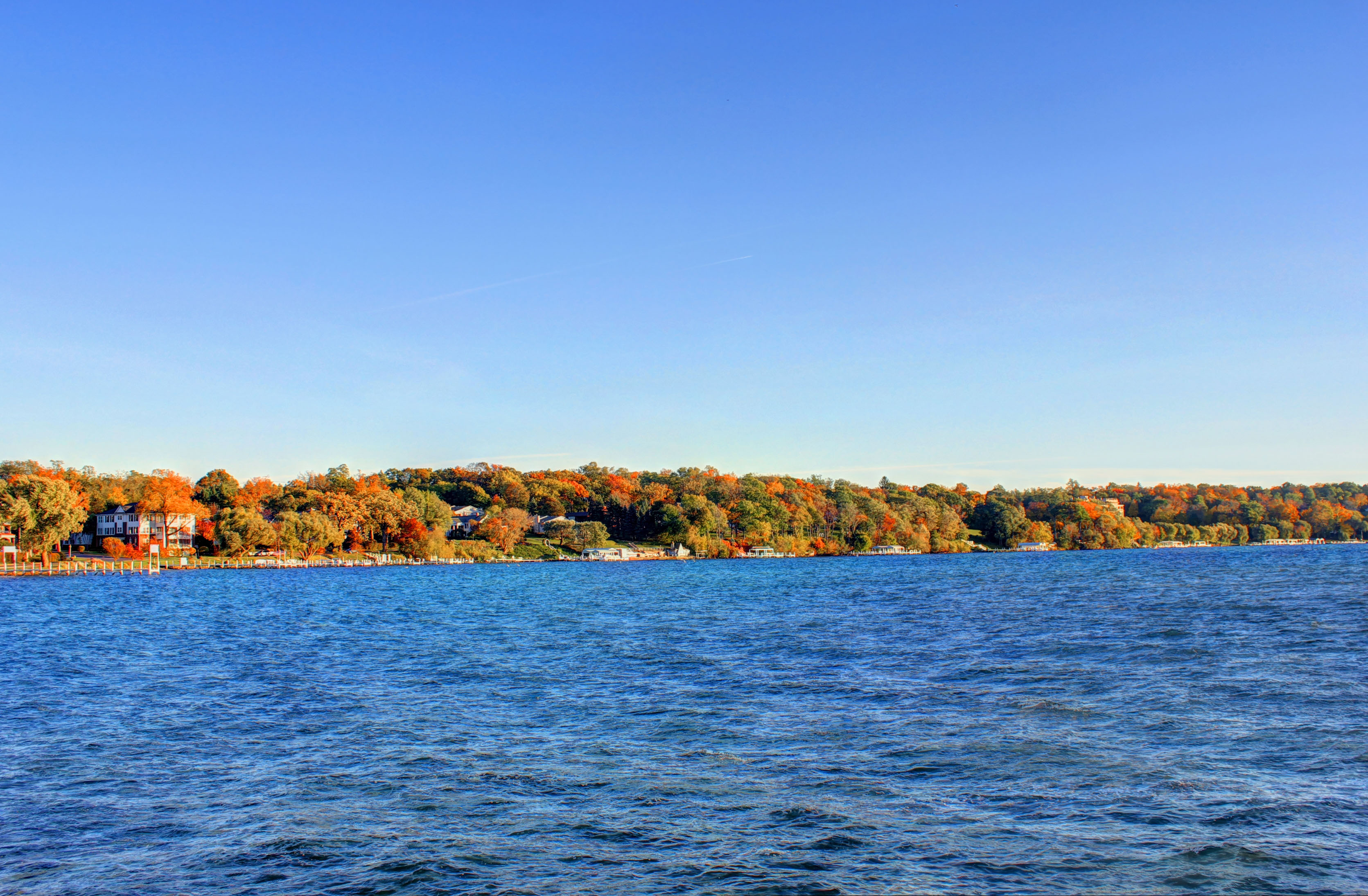
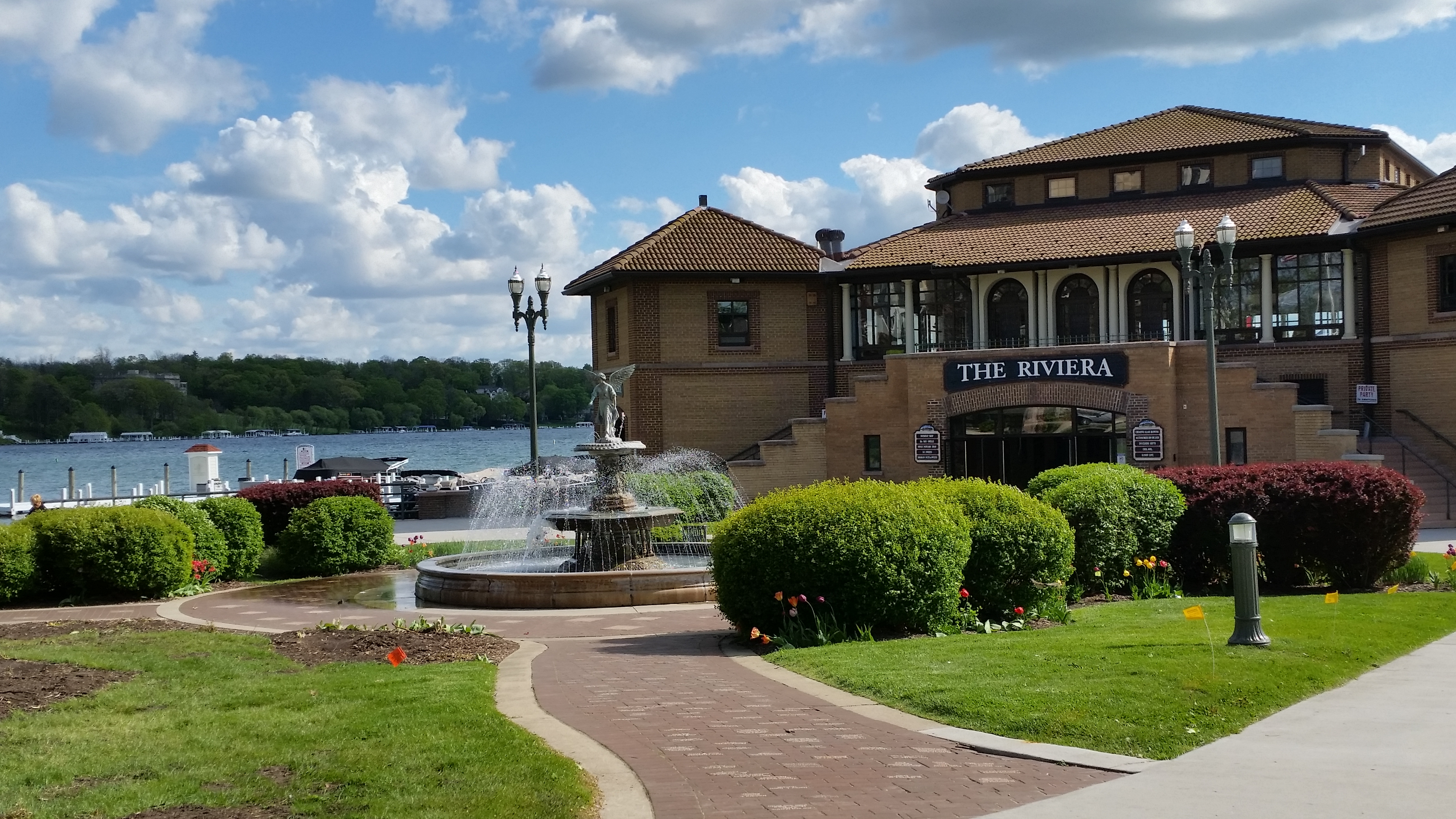
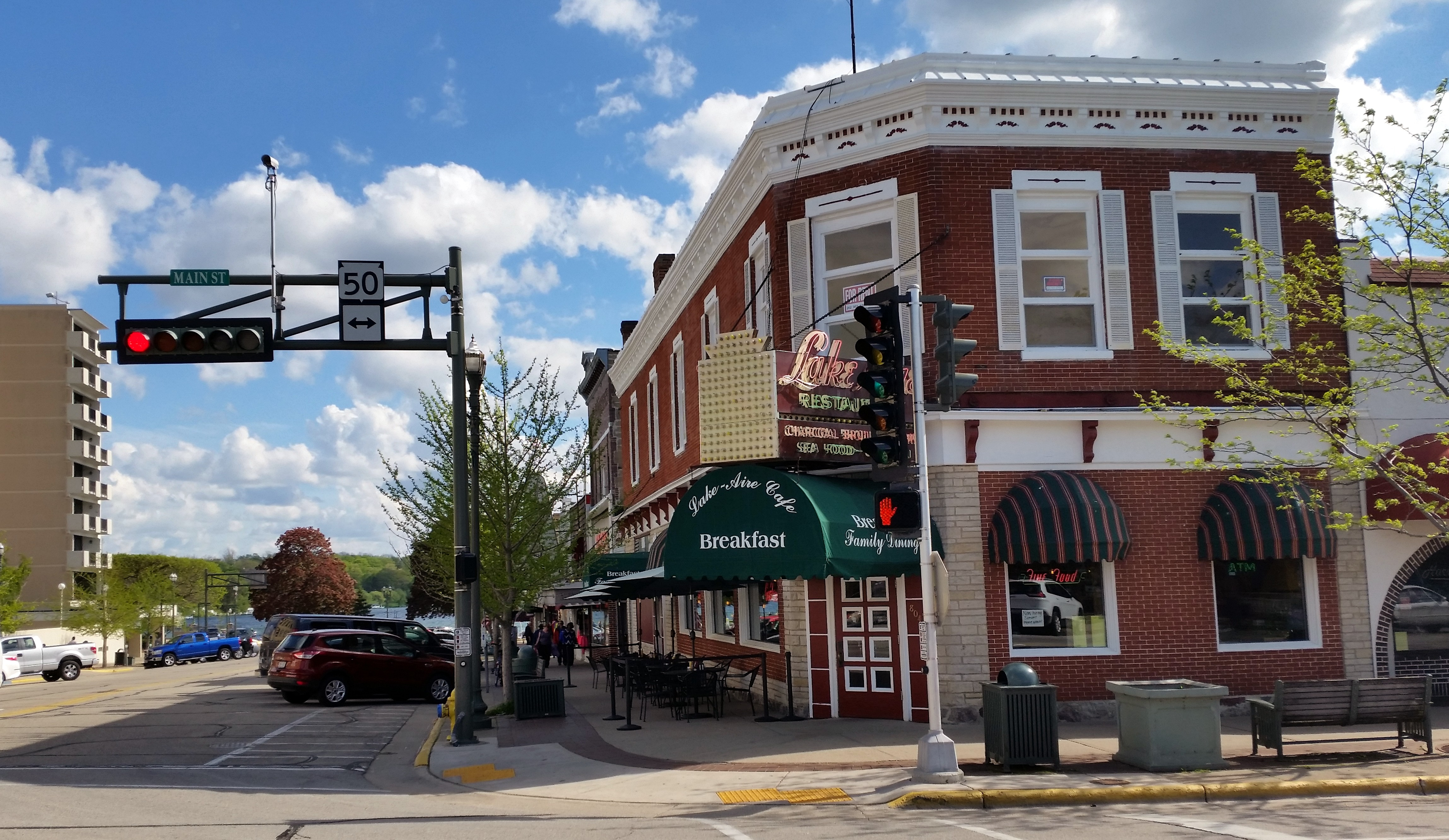
- Geneva Lake The Riviera Main Street
- Motto: "It's Always Been the Place"
- Location of Lake Geneva in Walworth County, Wisconsin.

- Location within Wisconsin Location within the United States
- Coordinates: 42°35′33″N 88°26′4″W
- Country: United States
- State: Wisconsin
- County: Walworth
- Incorporated: January 27, 1844 (village); March 30, 1883 (city)

Government
  - Mayor: Todd Krause
  - Administrator: David Nord

Area
  - Total: 6.87 sq mi (17.79 km^{2})
  - Land: 6.86 sq mi (17.76 km^{2})
  - Water: 0.0077 sq mi (0.02 km^{2})
- Elevation: 879 ft (268 m)

Population (2020)
  - Total: 8,277
  - Density: 1,181.8/sq mi (456.28/km^{2})
- Time zone: UTC-6 (Central (CST))
  - Summer (DST): UTC-5 (CDT)
- ZIP code: 53147
- Area code: 262
- FIPS code: 55-41450
- GNIS feature ID: 1581223
- Website: https://www.cityoflakegeneva.gov/

Lake Geneva is a city in Walworth County, Wisconsin, United States. Situated on Geneva Lake, the population was 8,277 at the 2020 census. It is located 40 miles (64 km) southwest of Milwaukee and 75 miles (121 km) northwest of Chicago.

Given its relative proximity to the Chicago and Milwaukee metropolitan areas, Lake Geneva has become a popular resort town that thrives on tourism. Since the late 19th century, it has been home to numerous lakefront mansions owned by wealthy Chicagoans as second homes, leading it to be nicknamed the "Newport of the West".

== History ==
Originally called "Maunk-suck" (Big Foot)" after the man who led the local band of the Potawatomi in the first half of the 19th century, the city was later named Geneva after the town of Geneva, New York, which government surveyor John Brink thought it resembled. To avoid confusion with the nearby town of Geneva, Wisconsin, it was later renamed "Lake Geneva".

After the Great Chicago Fire of 1871, a number of wealthy and prominent Chicago industrialists fled to the shores of Geneva Lake—then a popular summer camp destination—by train. Many of the families built palatial summer homes on the lake, which led it to be nicknamed the "Newport of the West." Lake Geneva remains a popular summer tourism destination for boating, water sports, and viewing the mansions, which can be seen from the public Geneva Lake Shore Path. Two historic Lake Geneva mansions are open to the public: the Baker House, built in 1885, now a bed-and-breakfast; and Black Point, the lakefront summer estate built for beer baron Conrad Seipp in 1888 in the nearby town of Linn, now a Wisconsin Historical Society museum. Other famous residents who built or have owned mansions on Geneva Lake include the Wrigleys, the Schwinns, Otto Young, and Richard Driehaus.

In 1954, Lake Geneva was one of the three finalists for the location of the new United States Air Force Academy, but lost to Colorado Springs, Colorado.

In 1968, Hugh Hefner built his first Playboy resort in Lake Geneva. It closed in 1981 and was converted in 1982 to the Americana Resort, and in 1993 to the Grand Geneva Resort.

Royal Recorders (formerly Shade Tree Studios) was a Lake Geneva music recording studio where artists such as Ministry, Cheap Trick, Queensrÿche, Crash Test Dummies, Nine Inch Nails, and Skid Row recorded albums.

Lake Geneva was also home to TSR, Inc., the original publisher of the Dungeons & Dragons roleplaying game, until its takeover by Wizards of the Coast in 1997. The Geneva Convention (now Gen Con) was first held at the Horticultural Hall in 1968. Originally Gary Gygax's post-funeral gathering, Gary Con is now a game convention which meets at the Grand Geneva resort every March to celebrate Gygax's life and works.

== Geography ==
Lake Geneva is located at 42°35′33″N 88°26′4″W (42.592380, -88.434424). The city is situated on the northeastern bay of Geneva Lake on relatively flat ground, with some steep hills and bluffs. The White River flows out of Geneva Lake for 19 miles (31 km) into Burlington.

According to the United States Census Bureau, the city has an area of 6.55 square miles (16.96 km^{2}), of which 6.54 square miles (16.94 km^{2}) is land and 0.01 square miles (0.03 km^{2}) is water.

=== Climate ===
Lake Geneva

Climate chart (precipitation, max. and min. temperature)
J	F	M	A	M	J	J	A	S	O	N	D
102 −8 −12	96 −4 −13	69 6 −6	160 18 2	102 21 8	148 25 14	95 25 16	105 25 15	70 23 12	95 16 5	66 6 −1	79 −4 −11
- █ Average max. and min. temperatures in °C
- █ Precipitation totals in mm
Imperial conversion
J	F	M	A	M	J	J	A	S	O	N	D
4 18 10	3.8 25 9	2.7 43 21	6.3 64 36	4 70 46	5.8 77 57	3.7 77 61	4.1 77 59	2.8 73 54	3.7 61 41	2.6 43 30	3.1 25 12
- █ Average max. and min. temperatures in °F
- █ Precipitation totals in inches

== Demographics ==
Historical population
Census	Pop.	Note	%±
1860	1,097		—
1870	997		−9.1%
1880	1,969		97.5%
1890	2,297		16.7%
1900	2,585		12.5%
1910	3,079		19.1%
1920	2,632		−14.5%
1930	3,073		16.8%
1940	3,238		5.4%
1950	4,300		32.8%
1960	4,929		14.6%
1970	4,890		−0.8%
1980	5,612		14.8%
1990	5,979		6.5%
2000	7,148		19.6%
2010	7,651		7.0%
2020	8,277		8.2%
U.S. Decennial Census

=== Racial and ethnic composition ===
Lake Geneva city, Wisconsin – Racial and ethnic composition Note: the US Census treats Hispanic/Latino as an ethnic category. This table excludes Latinos from the racial categories and assigns them to a separate category. Hispanics/Latinos may be of any race.
Race / Ethnicity (NH = Non-Hispanic)	Pop 2000	Pop 2010	Pop 2020	% 2000	% 2010	% 2020
White alone (NH)	5,908	6,091	6,478	82.65%	79.61%	78.27%
Black or African American alone (NH)	46	44	57	0.64%	0.58%	0.69%
Native American or Alaska Native alone (NH)	8	14	10	0.11%	0.18%	0.12%
Asian alone (NH)	76	111	138	1.06%	1.45%	1.67%
Native Hawaiian or Pacific Islander alone (NH)	2	1	0	0.03%	0.01%	0.00%
Other race alone (NH)	5	1	26	0.07%	0.01%	0.31%
Mixed race or Multiracial (NH)	49	66	280	0.69%	0.86%	3.38%
Hispanic or Latino (any race)	1,054	1,323	1,288	14.75%	17.29%	15.56%
Total	7,148	7,651	8,277	100.00%	100.00%	100.00%

=== 2020 census ===
At the 2020 census the population was 8,277.

=== 2010 census ===
At the 2010 census there were 7,651 people, 3,323 households, and 1,879 families living in the city. The population density was 1,169.9 inhabitants per square mile (451.7/km^{2}). There were 4,225 housing units at an average density of 646.0 units per square mile (249.4 units/km^{2}). The racial makeup of the city was 87.6% White, 0.6% African American, 0.2% Native American, 1.5% Asian, 8.5% from other races, and 1.6% from two or more races. Hispanic or Latino residents of any race were 17.3%.

Of the 3,323 households, 27.9% had children under the age of 18 living with them, 40.2% were married couples living together, 11.3% had a female householder with no husband present, 5.0% had a male householder with no wife present, and 43.5% were non-families. 36.6% of households were one person and 15.5% were one person aged 65 or older. The average household size was 2.28 and the average family size was 3.02.

The median age was 39.8 years. 22.7% of residents were under the age of 18; 8.2% were between the ages of 18 and 24; 25.5% were from 25 to 44; 26.8% were from 45 to 64; and 16.7% were 65 or older. The gender makeup of the city was 47.5% male and 52.5% female.

=== 2000 census ===
At the 2000 census there were 7,148 people, 3,053 households, and 1,801 families living in the city. The population density was 1,425.1 people per square mile (550.2 people/km^{2}). There were 3,757 housing units at an average density of 749.0 units per square mile (289.2 units/km^{2}). The racial makeup of the city was 90.81% White, 0.90% African American, 0.11% Native American, 1.08% Asian, 0.06% Pacific Islander, 5.16% from other races, and 1.89% from two or more races. Hispanic or Latino residents of any race were 14.75% of the population. At the 2010 census there were 7,651 people for a population growth of 7.04% from the 2000 United States census to the 2010 United States census.

Of the 3,053 households 27.8% had children under the age of 18 living with them, 45.1% were married couples living together, 9.8% had a female householder with no husband present, and 41.0% were non-families. 33.0% of households were one person and 12.8% were one person aged 65 or older. The average household size was 2.33 and the average family size was 3.01.

The age distribution was 23.0% under the age of 18, 9.8% from 18 to 24, 29.9% from 25 to 44, 22.4% from 45 to 64, and 15.0% 65 or older. The median age was 36 years. For every 100 females, there were 94.8 males. For every 100 females age 18 and over, there were 92.6 males.

The median household income was $40,924 and the median family income was $54,543. Males had a median income of $38,930 versus $25,671 for females. The per capita income for the city was $21,536. About 4.7% of families and 7.2% of the population were below the poverty line, including 9.0% of those under age 18 and 5.5% of those age 65 or over.

== Parks and recreation ==
Flatiron Park in Lake Geneva has the Lake Geneva Visitor Center inside its boundaries, while Seminary Park is the former site of the Lake Geneva Seminary. There is also a public beach on the shore of Geneva Lake.

== Government ==
The city of Lake Geneva operates under a mayor–council form of government. It has four aldermanic districts with two representatives per district. It is managed by a full-time city administrator. The city has an elected city attorney and an elected municipal judge.

== Media ==
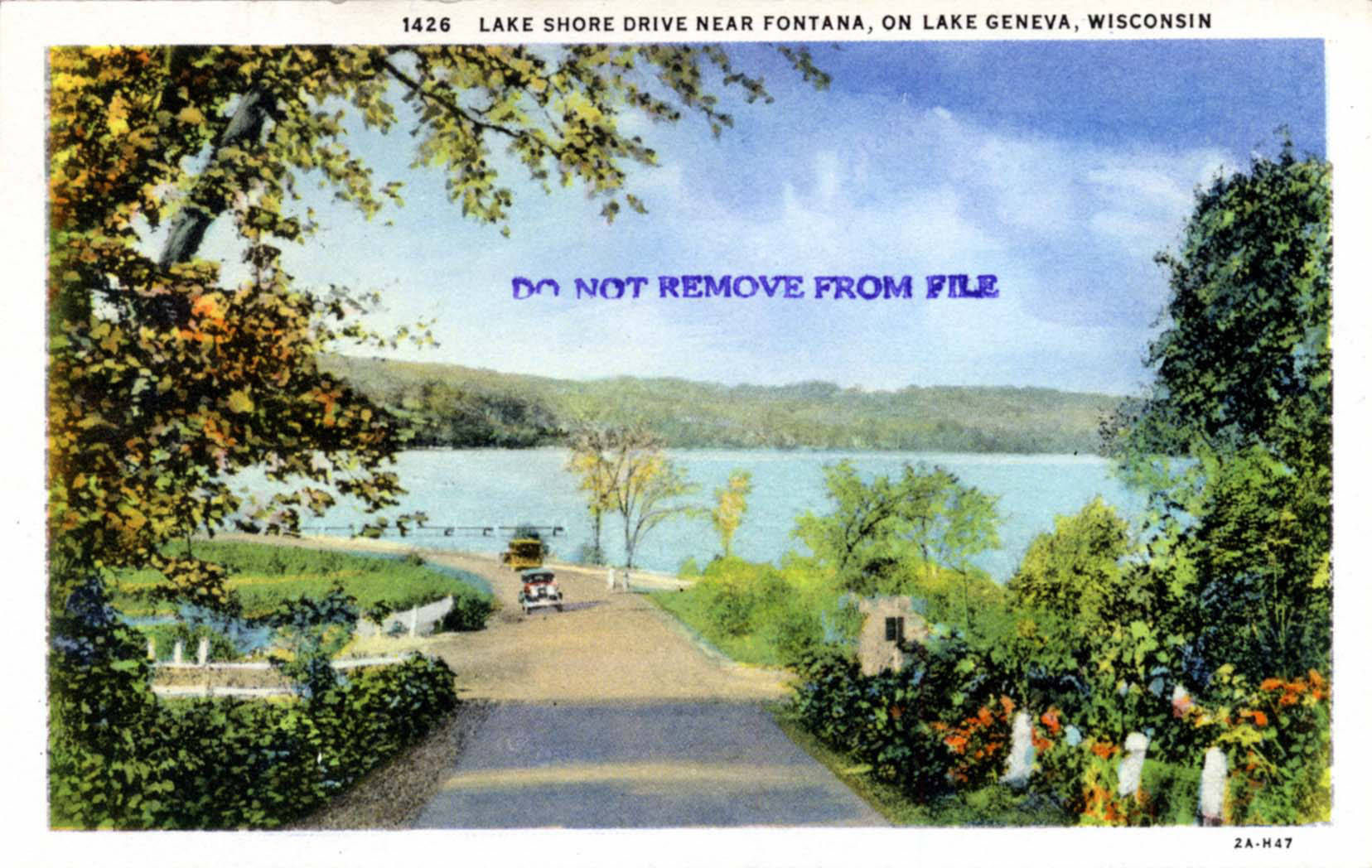
Lake Shore Drive near Fontana, 1932 postcard

Lake Geneva's main newspaper is the Lake Geneva Regional News, a Lee Enterprises-owned weekly newspaper that has served the Lake Geneva area since 1872. It is published every Thursday.

WLKG (96.1 FM) is a hot adult contemporary-formatted radio station licensed to Lake Geneva.

== Transportation ==
Lake Geneva is served by U.S. Route 12, as well as two Wisconsin state highways: Wisconsin Highway 50 and Wisconsin Highway 120. The Chicago and North Western Railway line to Williams Bay served Lake Geneva until 1975, when service was cut back to Richmond, Illinois.

== Notable people ==
- Margaret H. Bair, U.S. Air National Guard general
- Robert H. Baker, Wisconsin legislator, Chairman of the Republican Party of Wisconsin
- Hiram Barber, Jr., U.S. Representative from Illinois
- S. Carey, musician, member of Bon Iver
- Bobby Cook, National Basketball Association player
- Gary Gygax, writer and game designer; co-creator of Dungeons & Dragons; co-founder of Lake Geneva-based company TSR, Inc.
- M. W. Kalaher, Wisconsin legislator
- John Brayshaw Kaye, poet and politician
- Mary L. Kirchoff, author of Dragonlance novels
- Thomas Lennon, comedian, actor, and screenwriter; co-creator of Reno 911!
- Kerwin Mathews, actor
- Ryan Mathews, NASCAR driver
- Buddy Melges, Olympic gold medalist, member of the America's Cup Hall of Fame
- John R. Powers, author
- Ralph Townsend, author
- William Trinke, Wisconsin legislator
- Margaret Weis, author of Dragonlance novels
- Edwin A. Williams, Wisconsin legislator
