= Geneva Lake =

Lake in Walworth County, Wisconsin, US

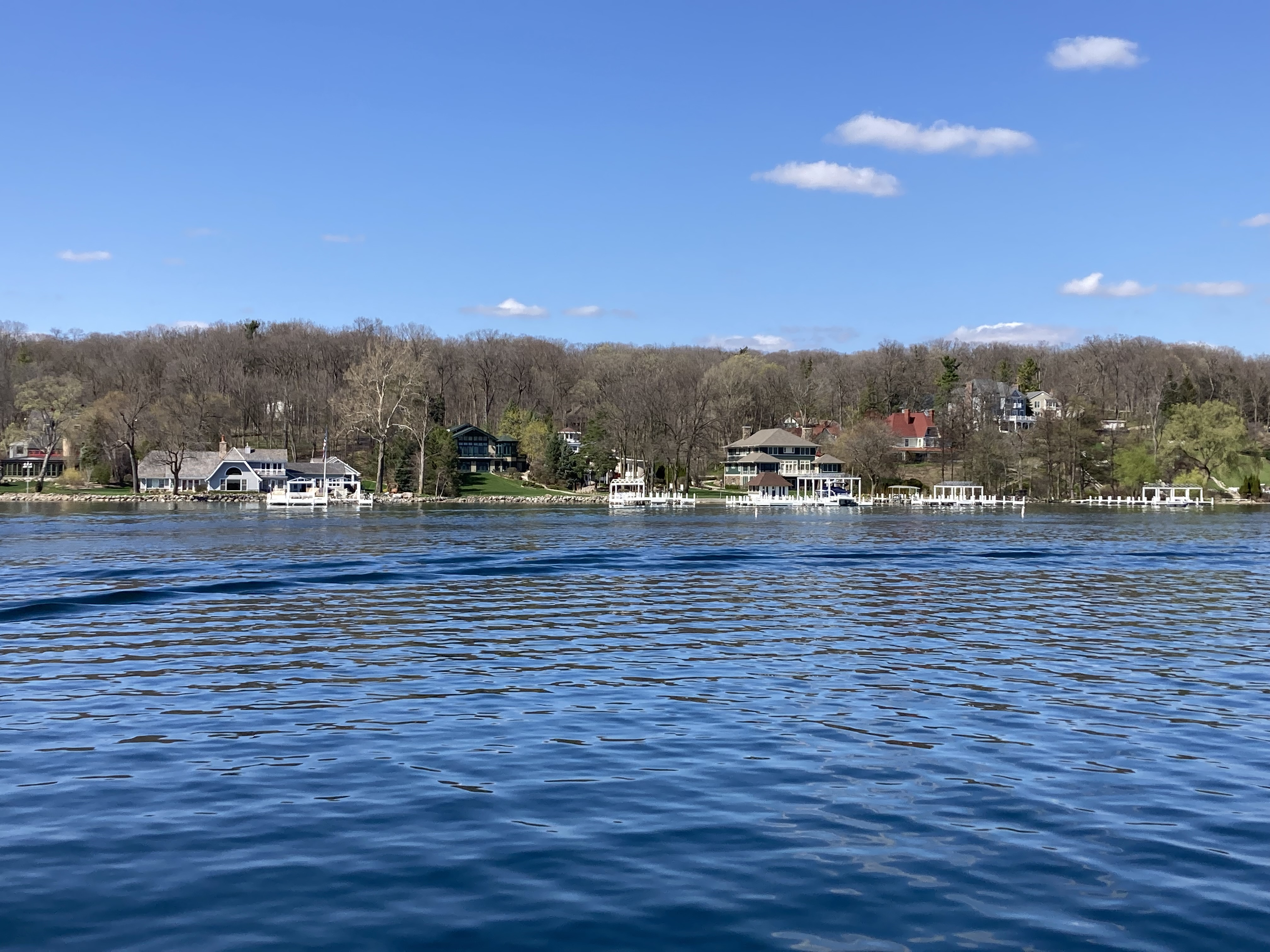

- Location within Wisconsin Location within the United States
- Location: Walworth County, Wisconsin, United States
- Coordinates: 42°33′54″N 88°30′14″W
- Primary outflows: White River
- Basin countries: United States
- Max. length: 12 km (7.5 mi)
- Max. width: 3.2 km (2.0 mi)
- Surface area: 5,401 acres (2,186 ha; 8.439 sq mi; 21.86 km^{2})
- Average depth: 61 feet (19 m)
- Max. depth: 135 feet (41 m)
- Settlements: Lake Geneva, Fontana-on-Geneva-Lake, Williams Bay

Geneva Lake (Potawatomi: Kishwauketoe 'Clear Water') is a body of freshwater in Walworth County in the southeastern portion of the U.S. state of Wisconsin. On its shores are the city of Lake Geneva and the villages of Fontana-on-Geneva-Lake and Williams Bay. The lake covers an area of approximately 5,401 acres (2,186 ha; 8.439 sq mi; 21.86 km^{2}), with a maximum length of 7.8 miles (12.6 km), a mean depth of 61 feet (19 m), and a maximum depth of 135 feet (41 m). Geologists believe that it is a filled-in kettle formed from a receding glacier.

== History ==
Geneva Lake was home to a band of Prairie Potawatomi prior to colonial settlement. During the first three decades of the nineteenth century, the band was led by Big Foot. This led the settlers on Geneva Lake to refer to it as Big Foot Lake.

In the 1830s, a government surveyor named John Brink renamed the lake and the town on it for Geneva, New York, another lakeside town which he thought they resembled. To avoid confusion with the nearby town of Geneva, Illinois on the same railroad line, the city was renamed Lake Geneva; in 1882, the lake was renamed Geneva Lake.

The lake is known as the only place in the world where mail jumping is practiced, an unusual mail delivery system maintained as a local tradition.

== Attractions and public access ==
Lakeshore attractions include Big Foot Beach State Park, Lake Geneva Yacht Club, the George Williams College campus of Aurora University, and Yerkes Observatory. The observatory is no longer owned by the University of Chicago, which transferred ownership of it to the non-profit Yerkes Future Foundation in May 2020.

Public access to the lake is allowed as the result of a decision by early European settlers that "20 feet [6 meters] of land leading up to the shoreline should be public domain."

A shorepath, which is open to the public, completely surrounds the lake. Between 21 and 26 miles (34 and 42 km) long, it follows the route taken by Potawatomi Indians. The path crosses the estates of the Schwinns, Swifts, Wackers, and Wrigleys.

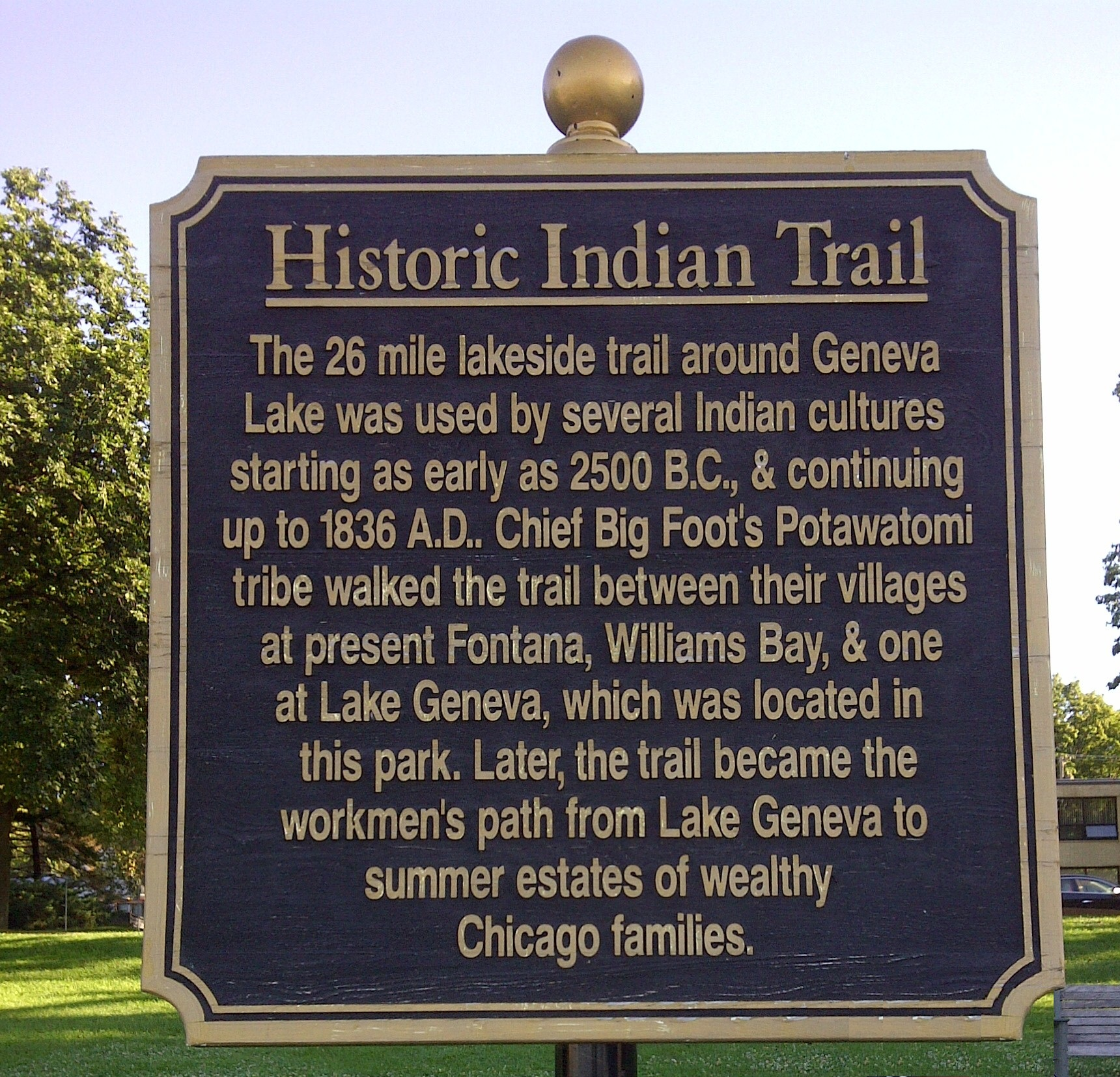
Geneva Lake Shorepath sign

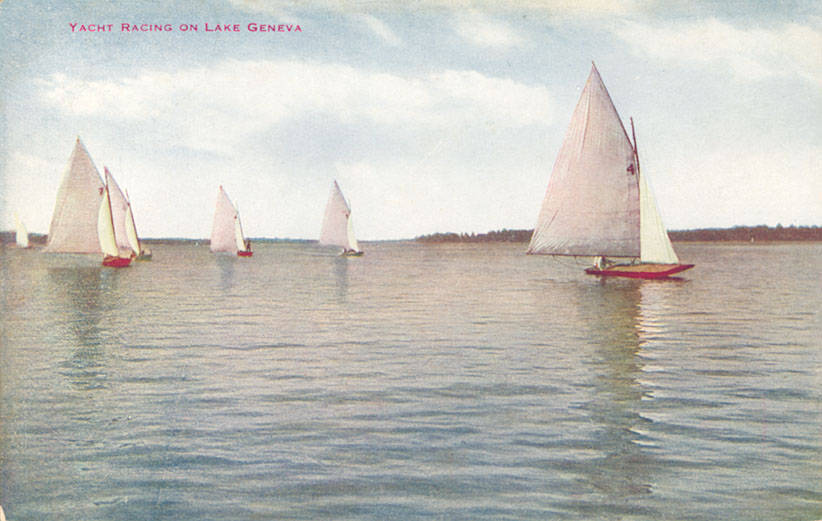
Yacht Racing On Lake Geneva, postcard

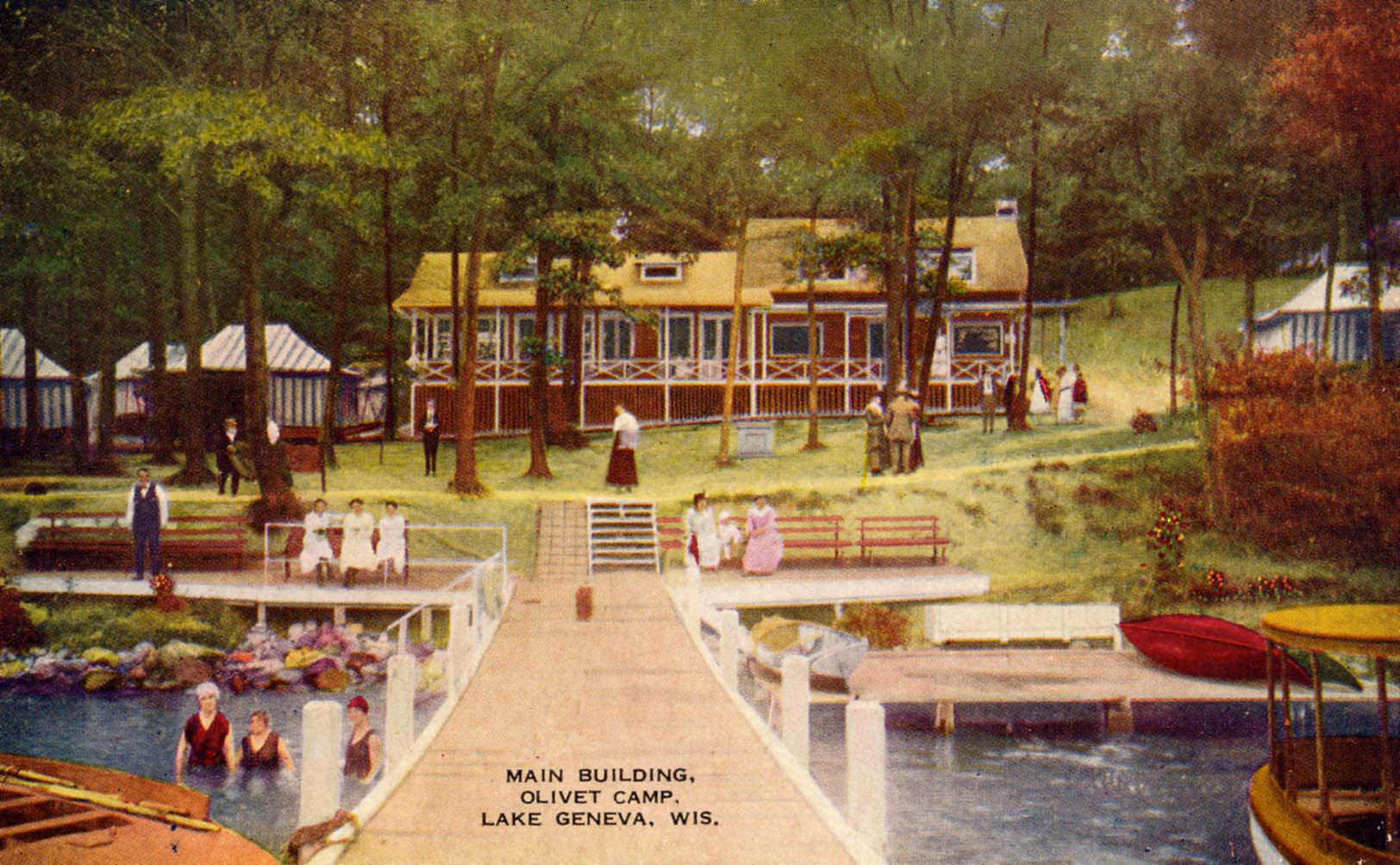
Olivet Camp, postcard
