= Harvard, Illinois =

- City
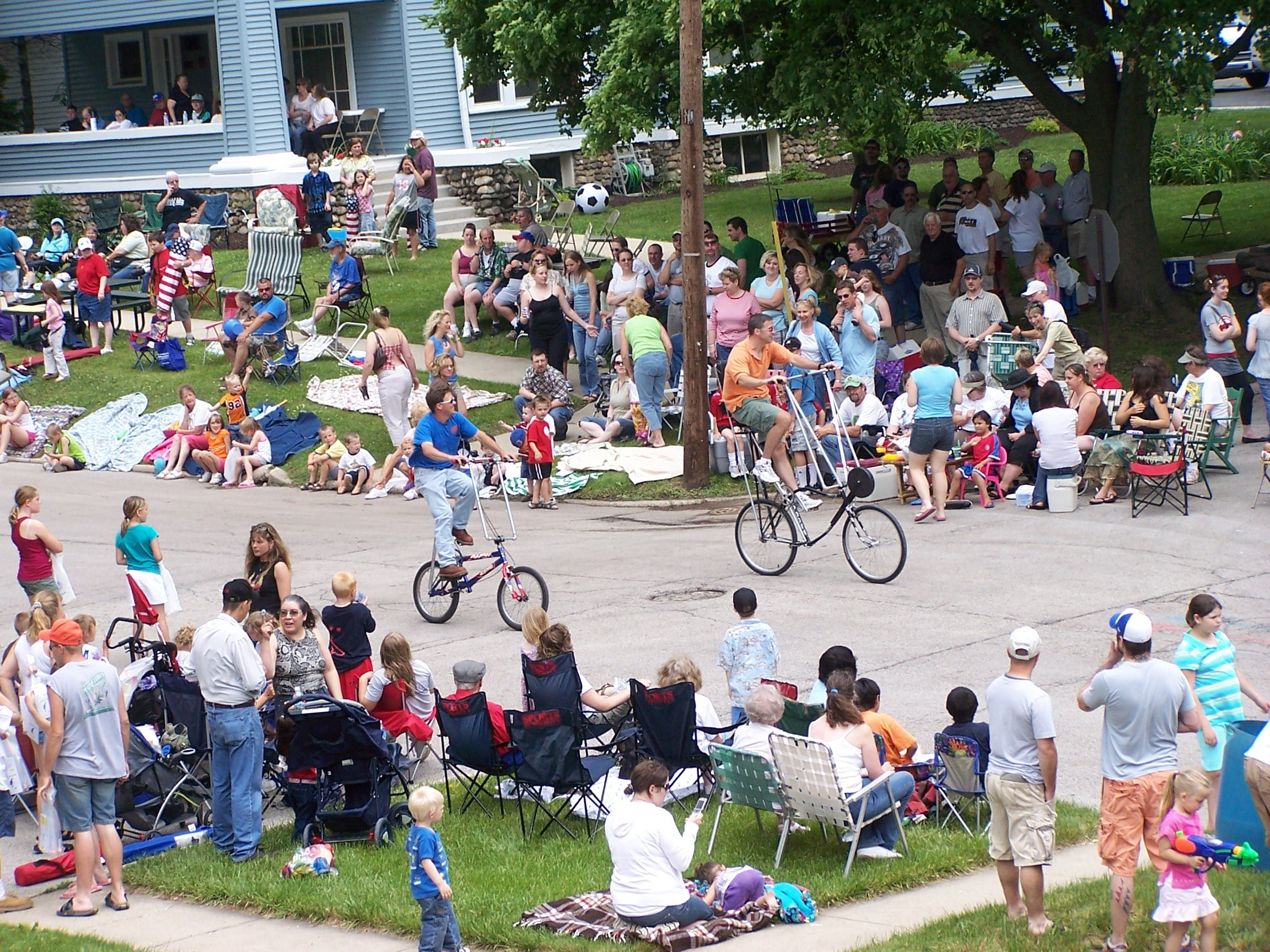
- People gathered for the Harvard, Illinois Milk Days Parade. June 2, 2007

- Flag Logo
- Motto: Success Comes Naturally Here
- Location of Harvard in McHenry County, Illinois.
- Coordinates: 42°25′56″N 88°37′42″W
- Country: United States
- State: Illinois
- County: McHenry
- Townships: Chemung, Dunham, Alden
- Founded: February 28, 1867

Area
  - Total: 8.36 sq mi (21.64 km^{2})
  - Land: 8.36 sq mi (21.64 km^{2})
  - Water: 0 sq mi (0.00 km^{2})
- Elevation: 925 ft (282 m)

Population (2020)
  - Total: 9,469
  - Density: 1,133.3/sq mi (437.58/km^{2})
- Time zone: UTC-6 (CST)
  - Summer (DST): UTC-5 (CDT)
- ZIP Code(s): 60033
- Area codes: 815, 779
- FIPS code: 17-33331
- GNIS feature ID: 2394315
- Website: cityofharvard.org

Harvard is a city located in McHenry County, Illinois. The population was 9,469 at the 2020 census. The city is 63 miles from the Chicago Loop and it is the last stop on the Union Pacific Northwest Line.

== History ==
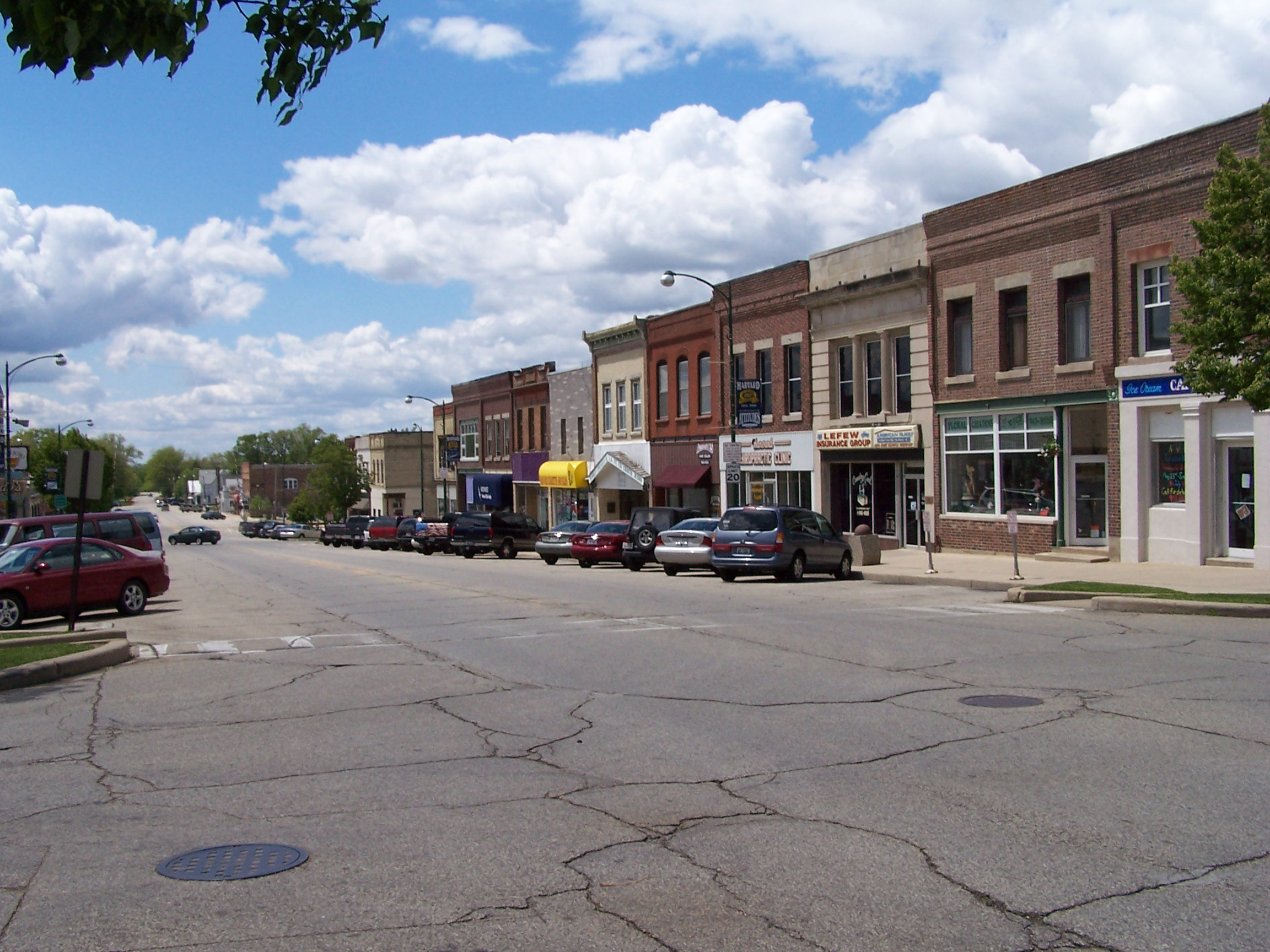
Looking southwest on Ayer Street. Downtown Harvard, Illinois

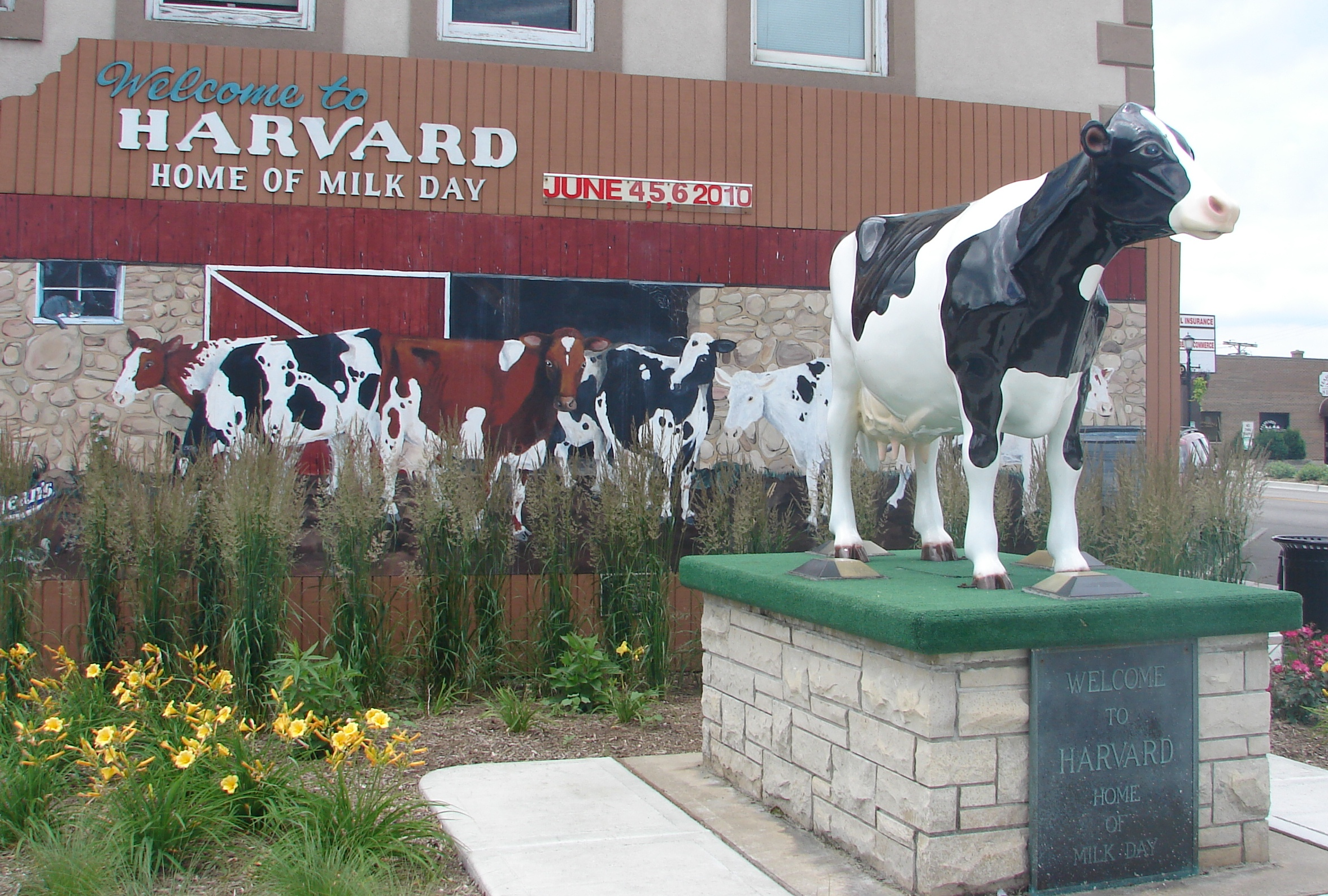
Statue of Harmilda the cow, commemorating Milk Days

The original owners of the land that came to be Harvard, Illinois, were Abram Carmack and Jacob Davis, who obtained it from the government in 1845 and sold it to Gilbert Brainard shortly afterward. Upon Gilbert Brainard's death, the land was purchased by Amos Page, Otis Eastman, and Elbridge Gerry Ayer. These three men planned the layout of the town and named it "Harvard" in honor of Harvard, Massachusetts. The plat was signed by Judge J. M. Strode in Woodstock, Illinois, on November 25, 1856. Shortly afterward, Amos Page and Otis Eastman sold their shares of the property to Elbridge Gerry Ayer. Mr.Ayer's involvement came out of his business interest in the extension of the Chicago and North Western Transportation Company railroad west from Cary, toward Janesville, Wisconsin. The newly platted town of Harvard was located directly on the route of the extension, and in April 1856, the railroad accepted Ayer's offer of land to build a station in the town.

In 1856, Mr. Wesley Diggins built a hotel for Mr. H. C. Blackman, who sold it to Mr. Elbridge Gerry Ayer in 1859. Mr. Ayer built additional floors to raise it to a height of three stories and added a wing and a veranda. During the Civil War, sick and wounded soldiers passing through Harvard were lodged at the hotel with no charge for their meals. In 1925, the Ayer Hotel was purchased by Mr. S. J. Noble and renamed the Noble Hotel. When he could not maintain mortgage payments, it was purchased in 1937 by Mr. P. G. Allen and renamed the Hub Hotel. The building was destroyed in a fire on December 22, 1960.

As railroad employment expanded, Harvard's population grew. On April 18, 1869, voters incorporated the community and elected Elbridge Gerry Ayer as the first village president. The first ordinance adopted required every able-bodied citizen between the ages of 18 and 60 to perform one day of labor for the town.

Harvard was turned from a town into a city when citizens voted to do so (with a vote of 550 to 5) on April 6, 1891. With this change, Harvard was no longer a town administered by a village president. It became a city administered by a mayor.

Motorola opened a 1,500,000 square feet (140,000 m^{2}) mobile telephone manufacturing and distribution facility on Harvard's north side in 1997. The plant employed more than 5,000 at its peak. However, a combination of factors, including a significant decline in Motorola's business in the early 2000s, compelled the company to shutter the facility in 2003. On August 13, 2008, the 1.5 million square foot facility was sold to Optima International's (Note: Mordechai Korf and Uriel Lader founded Optima International of Miami in 1994 and Optima Ventures, LLC, is one firm in the Optima Family.) Optima Ventures, LLC (Note: The Optima Family had an Optima Harvard Facility LLC account.) a Miami-based real estate investment firm led by Chaim Schochet and 2/3rd owned by the Ihor Kolomoyskyi associated Privat Group, one of Ukraine's largest business and banking groups holding 33% of the individual deposits and accounting for 25% of Ukraine's banking sector from 2003 to 2016. (Note: When PrivatBank was nationalized in 2016, Ihor Kolomoyskyi held 80% of PrivatBank's loan portfolio with almost none of the loans backed with collateral. The IMF loans to Ukraine were paying for Kolomoyskyi, seven of his friends, two of their subordinates, and their company's problematic loans. On February 14, 2017, their companies were liquidated. The alleged nominal owners for the beneficial ownership of Kolomoyskyi were Viktor Shkindel, Ihor Malanchak and Ivan Makoviichuk, who owned eight Kharkiv firms, and Viacheslav Plakasov, who was the CEO of Optima 770, Volodymyr Golovko, who is a manager in Kolomoyskyi's oil refinery, Serhiy Kazarov, who is the head of the fuel supplier Tsyurupinskiy Agropostach, Vitaly Nemov, who is a manager of a gas station for Avias and owns Olymp Oil, Vadim Andreyuk, who owned three Kharkiv firms, and Anatoliy Derkach, who is a taxi driver that owns Avaris.) (Note: On August 6, 2020, the United States Department of Justice in the Southern District of Florida (Miami) alleged that Ihor Kolomoisky, Gennadiy Boholiubov, Mordechai Korf, and Uriel Lader collectively obtained the factory as part of a $5.5 billion Ponzi scheme as "an international conspiracy to launder money embezzled and fraudulently obtained from PrivatBank," which was nationalized in 2016 to prevent a collapse of Ukraine's equivalent to the United States' FDIC, and using PrivatBank's "Cyprus branch... as a washing machine for the stolen loan funds.") In 2016, Xiao Hua "Edward" Gong, who was born in China but resides in Toronto, purchased the former Motorola plant but, in December 2017, prosecutors in Canada and New Zealand alleged that the plant was part of a money laundering scheme and fraud involving Chinese citizens purchasing securities valued at hundreds of millions of dollars and supported by firms in New Zealand.

In 2006, Harvard held a year-long Sesquicentennial Celebration. The Greater Harvard Area Historical Society is located on Hart Street. The society identifies and marks historical sites in the area. It also works to obtain histories of Harvard families, businesses, and farms that have been in operation for more than 100 years.

Harvard is the self-proclaimed Milk Capital of the World and hosts one of the longest-running festivals in Illinois, Harvard Milk Days, the first weekend of June, to commemorate their contributions to milk production during WWII.

A symbol of the Milk Days Festival, the statue of a cow, Harmilda, "stands 5 feet tall, 8 feet long, and weighs about 125 pounds."

== Geography ==
According to the 2010 census, Harvard has a total area of 8.58 square miles (22.22 km^{2}), all land.

=== Major streets ===
- Airport Road
- Ayer Street
- Crowley Road
- Diggins Street/Brink Street
- Division Street
- Flat Iron Road
- Lawrence Road
- Marengo Street
- McGuire Road
- Oak Grove Road
- Ramer Road

== Demographics ==
Historical population
Census	Pop.	Note	%±
1870	1,120		—
1880	1,607		43.5%
1890	1,967		22.4%
1900	2,602		32.3%
1910	3,008		15.6%
1920	3,294		9.5%
1930	2,988		−9.3%
1940	3,121		4.5%
1950	3,464		11.0%
1960	4,248		22.6%
1970	5,177		21.9%
1980	5,126		−1.0%
1990	5,975		16.6%
2000	7,996		33.8%
2010	9,447		18.1%
2020	9,469		0.2%
U.S. Decennial Census; 2010 2020

=== Racial and ethnic composition ===
Harvard, Illinois – Racial and ethnic composition Note: the US Census treats Hispanic/Latino as an ethnic category. This table excludes Latinos from the racial categories and assigns them to a separate category. Hispanics/Latinos may be of any race.
Race / Ethnicity (NH = Non-Hispanic)	Pop 2000	Pop 2010	Pop 2020	% 2000	% 2010	% 2020
White (NH)	4,741	4,901	3,885	59.29%	51.88%	41.03%
Black or African American (NH)	46	64	55	0.58%	0.68%	0.58%
Native American or Alaska Native (NH)	23	16	4	0.29%	0.17%	0.04%
Asian (NH)	109	63	75	1.36%	0.67%	0.79%
Native Hawaiian or Pacific Islander alone (NH)	0	0	0	0.00%	0.00%	0.00%
Other race alone (NH)	0	12	17	0.00%	0.13%	0.18%
Mixed race or Multiracial (NH)	54	121	219	0.68%	1.28%	2.31%
Hispanic or Latino (any race)	3,023	4,270	5,214	37.81%	45.20%	55.06%
Total	7,996	9,447	9,469	100.00%	100.00%	100.00%

=== 2020 census ===
As of the 2020 census, Harvard had a population of 9,469. The median age was 32.0 years. 29.8% of residents were under the age of 18 and 10.8% were 65 years of age or older. For every 100 females, there were 103.3 males, and for every 100 females age 18 and over, there were 100.8 males age 18 and over.

98.8% of residents lived in urban areas, while 1.2% lived in rural areas.

There were 3,127 households, of which 42.9% had children under the age of 18 living in them. Of all households, 46.8% were married-couple households, 18.7% were households with a male householder and no spouse or partner present, and 25.3% were households with a female householder and no spouse or partner present. About 23.3% of all households were made up of individuals, and 9.7% had someone living alone who was 65 years of age or older.

There were 3,306 housing units, of which 5.4% were vacant. The homeowner vacancy rate was 1.3%, and the rental vacancy rate was 4.9%.

=== 2000 census ===
As of the census of 2000, there were 7,996 people, 2,610 households, and 1,853 families residing in the city. The population density was 1,498.2 inhabitants per square mile (578.5/km^{2}). There were 2,723 housing units at an average density of 510.2 per square mile (197.0/km^{2}). The racial makeup of the city was 76.25% White, 0.85% African American, 0.38% Native American, 1.43% Asian, 0.01% Pacific Islander, 18.76% from other races, and 2.33% from two or more races. Hispanic or Latino of any race were 37.81% of the population.

There were 2,610 households, out of which 39.7% had children under the age of 18 living with them; 53.8% were married couples living together, 11.1% had a female householder with no husband present, and 29.0% were non-families; 24.0% of all households were made up of individuals, and 10.1% had someone living alone who was 65 years of age or older. The average household size was 3.05, and the average family size was 3.56.

In the city, the population was spread out, with 30.1% under the age of 18, 12.7% from 18 to 24, 31.3% from 25 to 44, 16.8% from 45 to 64, and 9.1% who were 65 years of age or older. The median age was 29 years. For every 100 females, there were 107.5 males. For every 100 females age 18 and over, there were 105.9 males.

The median income for a household in the city was $44,363, and the median income for a family was $48,087. Males had a median income of $30,578 versus $23,750 for females. The per capita income for the city was $17,253. About 6.9% of families and 9.1% of the population were below the poverty line, including 11.2% of those under age 18 and 1.2% of those age 65 or over.

=== Religion ===
Active congregations are listed in the table.

Church	Address	Denomination
Alden United Methodist Church	16532 Route 173	Methodist
Asamblea Apostolica de la fa en Cristo Jesus	26 N. Ayer	
Cornerstone Pentecostal Church of God	343 S. Division	Pentecostal
First Baptist Church	1102 N. Fourth Street	Baptist
First Presbyterian Church	7100 Harvard Hills Road	Presbyterian
First Southern Baptist Church	1102 N. 4th Street	Baptist
First United Methodist Church of Harvard	1100 N. Division	Methodist
Harvard Bible Church	5817 Island Road	Bible
Holy Transfiguration Greek Orthodox Monastery	17906 Route 173	Eastern Orthodox
Iglesia Hispania Pentecostal Church	301 W Brainard	Pentecostal
New Hope Community Church	20906 S. Division	
New Life Pentecostal Church	309 N. Division	Pentecostal
Solid Rock Community Church	602 Old Orchard Rd	
St Joseph Catholic Church	206 E. Front	Roman Catholic
St Paul Lutheran Church	1601 Garfield Road	Lutheran
Trinity Evangelical Lutheran Church	504 E. Diggins	Lutheran
Yahweh Christian Church	1410 Northfield Ct	Non-Denominational

== Education ==
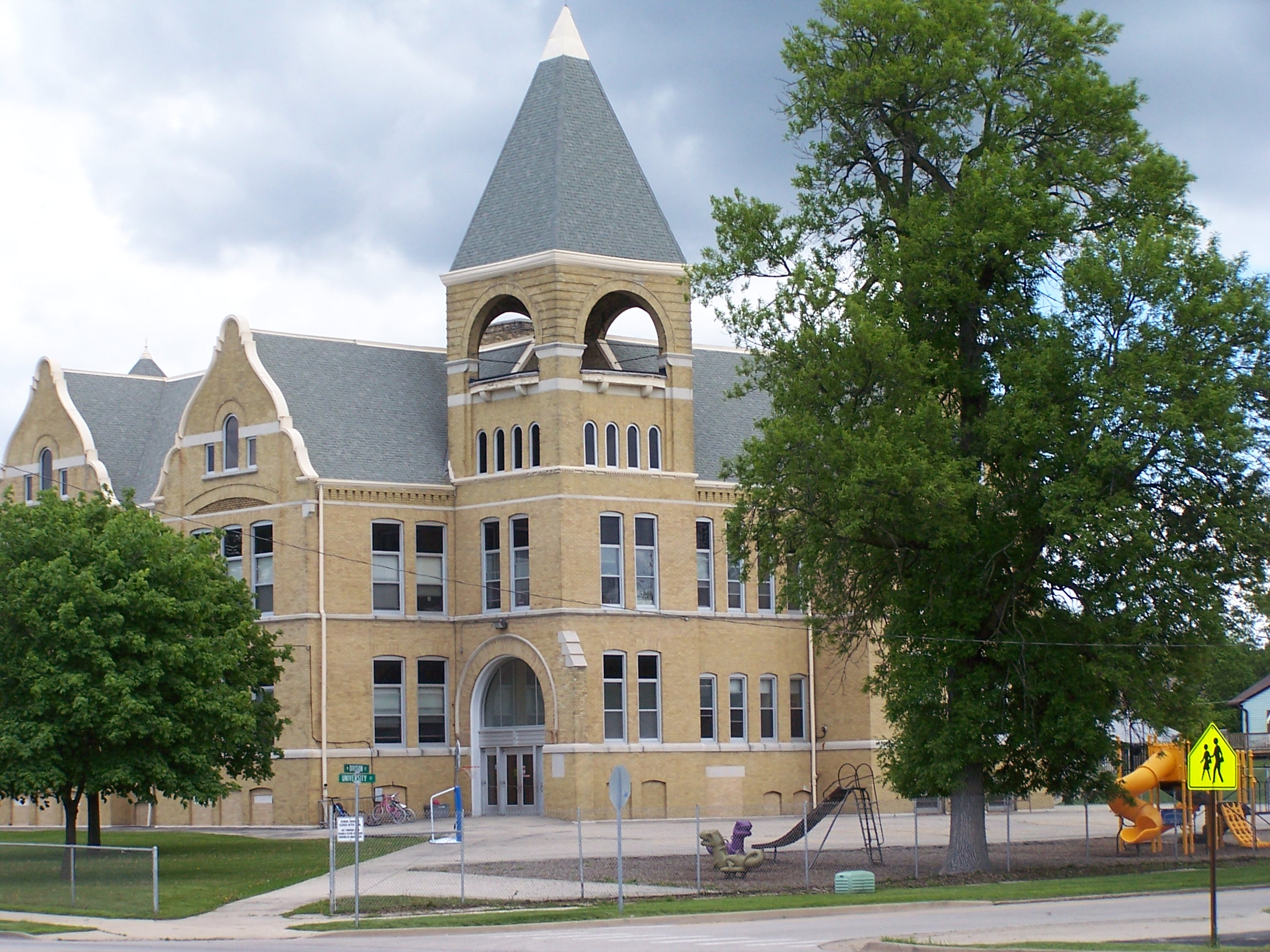
Historic Central School, Harvard, Illinois

Harvard School District No. 50 operates five schools within the city:

- Harvard High School: grades 9–12
- Harvard Junior High School: grades 6–8
- Jefferson Elementary School: grades 4 and 5
- Richard B. Crosby Elementary School: grades K-3
- Washington School: Pre-K and ECE

The Roman Catholic Diocese of Rockford operated one school in Harvard, St. Joseph's School: pre-kindergarten, kindergarten, and grades 1–8. The school was closed at the end of the 2015–16 school year due to financial issues.

=== Harvard Diggins Library ===
Harvard Diggins Library began serving the Harvard community in 1909. Delos F. Diggins, who spent his childhood in Harvard, provided a generous bequest to the City of Harvard to build a library. That building, named the Delos F. Diggins Library, became the first free-standing public library in McHenry County. The library served the community successfully from that building until a new library was built in 2001. In deference to the lasting legacy of Delos Diggins, the library was renamed the Harvard Diggins Library. Currently, Harvard Diggins Library is a member of the Northern Illinois Cooperative consortium and the Reaching Across Illinois Library System.

The Harvard Diggins Library building encompasses 19,000 square feet of space. The core of the facility houses the collection, but designated space is available for children, teens, quiet study, and meeting space. Public events are hosted at the library on a regular basis, including lectures, performances, crafts, storytimes, and more. As a municipal library, library cards are free to city residents, and it allows borrowing of materials from most public libraries in Illinois. Non-residents may purchase a card for an annual fee.

== Government ==
=== Post office ===
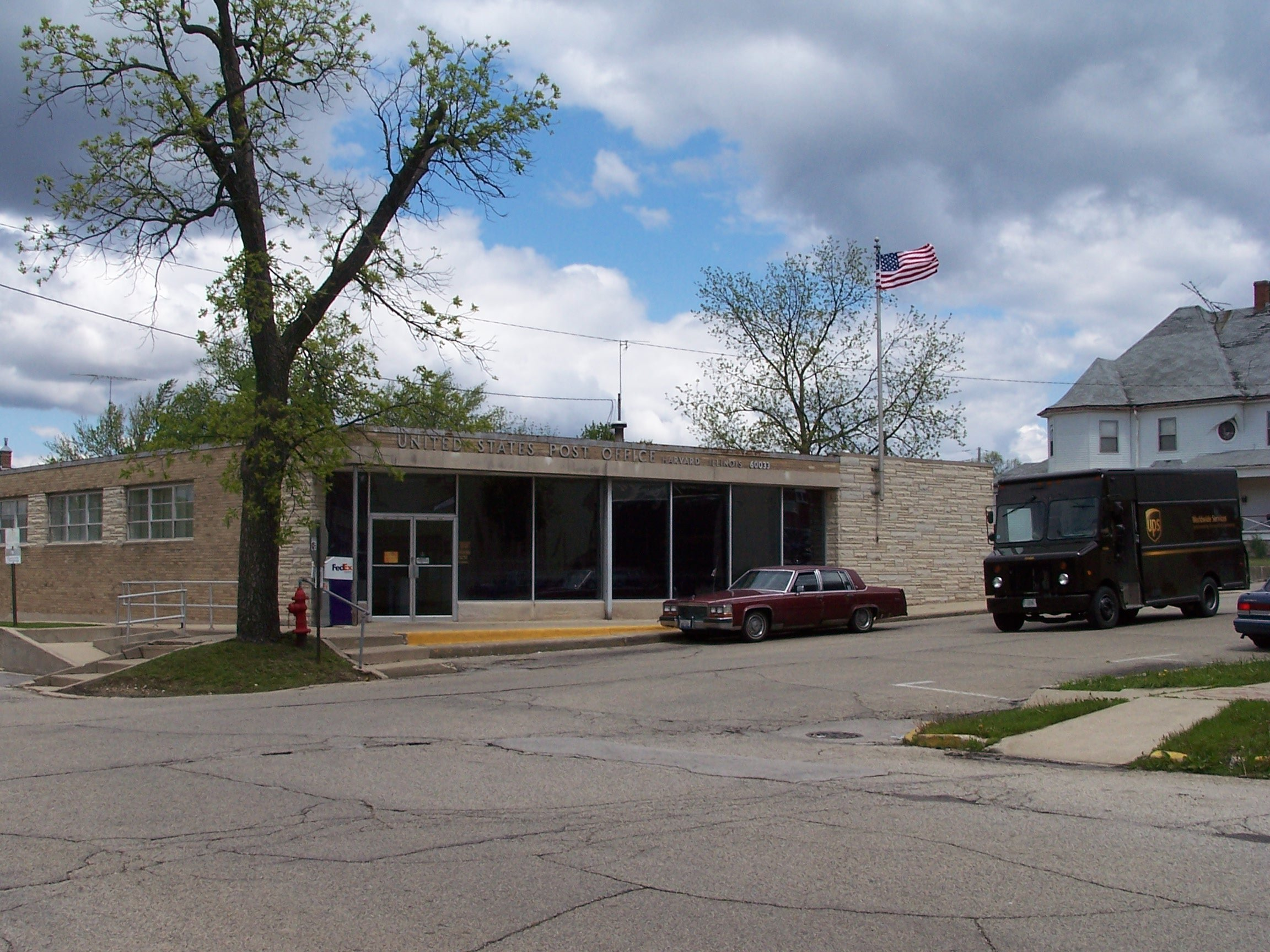
Harvard, Illinois Post Office.

The U.S. Post Office is located on Harvard's North Eastman Street. The current building was constructed during the Kennedy Administration in 1962 when J. Edward Day was the Postmaster General.

=== Law enforcement ===
The Harvard Police Department is located in the lower level of the old City Hall building at 201 W. Front Street. It consists of 17 full-time police officers, led by Chief of Police Tyson Bauman, a full-time record clerk, and one full-time community services officer (CSO). Dispatch services are provided by the North East Regional Communications Center, also known as NERCOM, of which the department is a founding and partner member, and is located in McHenry, Illinois. The department has a full-time detective, a school resource officer, and bicycles for officers to patrol the city streets, parks, and downtown area.

=== Fire protection ===
Harvard's Fire Protection District consists of 47 trained firefighters, of which 22 are Emergency medical technicians, and 14 are paramedics. The district traces its history to 1865, when five men got together to purchase a fire engine for the village of Harvard. In 1871, the engine was sent to Chicago via the railroad to assist in the Great Chicago Fire. In 1892, it was again placed on a train to assist with a fire in the community of Kenosha, Wisconsin. In 1899, the first constitution and bylaws were drawn up for the Harvard Fire Department. The Harvard Rescue Squad was founded in 1956 with a $7000 donation from the Harvard Jaycees. In 1971, the City and Rural Fire Department merged to form the Harvard Fire Protection District.

Currently, the Harvard Fire Protection District is governed by a five-member board of trustees appointed by the McHenry County Board. While the Fire District works very closely with the city of Harvard, it is a separate government agency. The district provides fire and emergency medical service for 108 square miles (280 km^{2}) and is funded by ambulance user fees and property taxes. It is part of the Mercy Health EMS System, which operates out of Mercy Health Javon Bea Hospital in Rockford, IL, a Level I trauma hospital. The district also has a SCUBA dive team, trained for water rescue. This team is part of the McHenry County MABAS 5 Dive Team.

== Transportation ==
U.S. Route 14, locally known as the Northwest Highway and Division Street, runs north–south through Harvard. Illinois Route 23 begins in southern Harvard and connects the city with other locations to the south. Illinois Route 173 also runs east–west through Harvard, and it connects many other towns along the Wisconsin border to Harvard. The nearest Interstate Highway to Harvard is Interstate 90 in Marengo and Belvidere; Interstate 39 in Machesney Park is also nearby, as is Interstate 43 in Darien, Wisconsin.

Harvard is also served by multiple forms of public transportation. Pace operates Route 808 in Harvard. This route links the city to the communities of Woodstock and Crystal Lake. Metra's Union Pacific Northwest Line has a station in Harvard and operates daily service to Chicago's Ogilvie Transportation Center. The Harvard station is the most remote point in the Metra system at 63.16 miles (101.65 km) from downtown Chicago. Harvard was previously served by the KD Line until 1939. It ran between Kenosha in the northeast and Rockford in the southwest.

== Media ==
Harvard is served by WHIW-LP 101.3 FM, Harvard Community Radio. A low-power FM station, WHIW-LP, began broadcasting on the FM frequency on May 18, 2015. Before May 2015, the station was heard on AM 1610. WHIW-LP also streams online.

WHIW-LP provides local programming including news, sports, school, music, arts, and more. WHIW is an all-volunteer community radio station that depends on the support of its listeners and station underwriters. The station received its 501(c)(3) exempt status in 2013.

Harvard once had a daily newspaper, the Harvard Herald, which was published from 1887 until 1986. In September 2009, a new monthly publication, the Harvard Main Line, was launched. The city is also served by the Northwest Herald, which covers all of McHenry County.

== Notable people ==
- Ollie Anderson (1879-1945), baseball umpire player
- Edward E. Ayer (1841–1927) helped found the Field Museum of Natural History and the Newberry Library in Chicago
- Elbridge Ayer Burbank (1858–1949), portrait painter of Native Americans, especially known for Geronimo
- Bobby Cook (1923–2004), pro basketball player
- Clarence Darrow (1857–1938), of Scopes Trial fame, had a law office in downtown Harvard
- Dorothy Ayer Gardner Ford, mother of President Gerald Ford
- Paul Galvin (1895–1959), founder of Motorola Corporation
- Lon Haldeman, cyclist, Race Across America winner
- Red Lanning, pitcher and outfielder for the Philadelphia Athletics
- Carol Richards (1922–2007), singer and radio-TV personality
- Jonathan J. Smith, Wisconsin state legislator

== See also ==
- List of mayors of Harvard, Illinois
