= Community High School District 155 =

School district in Illinois, United States

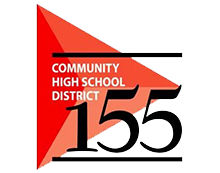

Location
- Illinois., 60014; United States

Students and staff
- Students: 5,673 (2022)

Other information
- Website: www.d155.org

Community High School District 155 is a local school district serving areas of McHenry County, Illinois.

The current Superintendent of this district is Steve Olson. Community High School District 155 includes the communities of Bull Valley, Burtons Bridge, Cary, Crystal Lake, Fox River Grove, Lake in the Hills, Lakewood, Oakwood Hills, Prairie Grove, and Ridgefield, and the district is approximately 45 miles northwest of downtown Chicago. Enrollment is 5,673 students, as of 2022.

== History ==
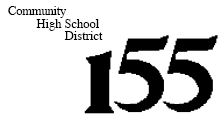
Former logo of District 155.

Community High School District 155 was established on December 6, 1919, by an election.

== Schools ==
There are four comprehensive high schools as well as one alternative education center, grades 9–12. The five schools are:

- Crystal Lake Central High School, established 1924
- Crystal Lake South High School, established 1978
- Cary-Grove High School, established 1961
- Prairie Ridge High School, established 1997
- Haber Oaks, alternative education center, established 2008
