= McHenry County, Illinois =

County in Illinois, United States

- County
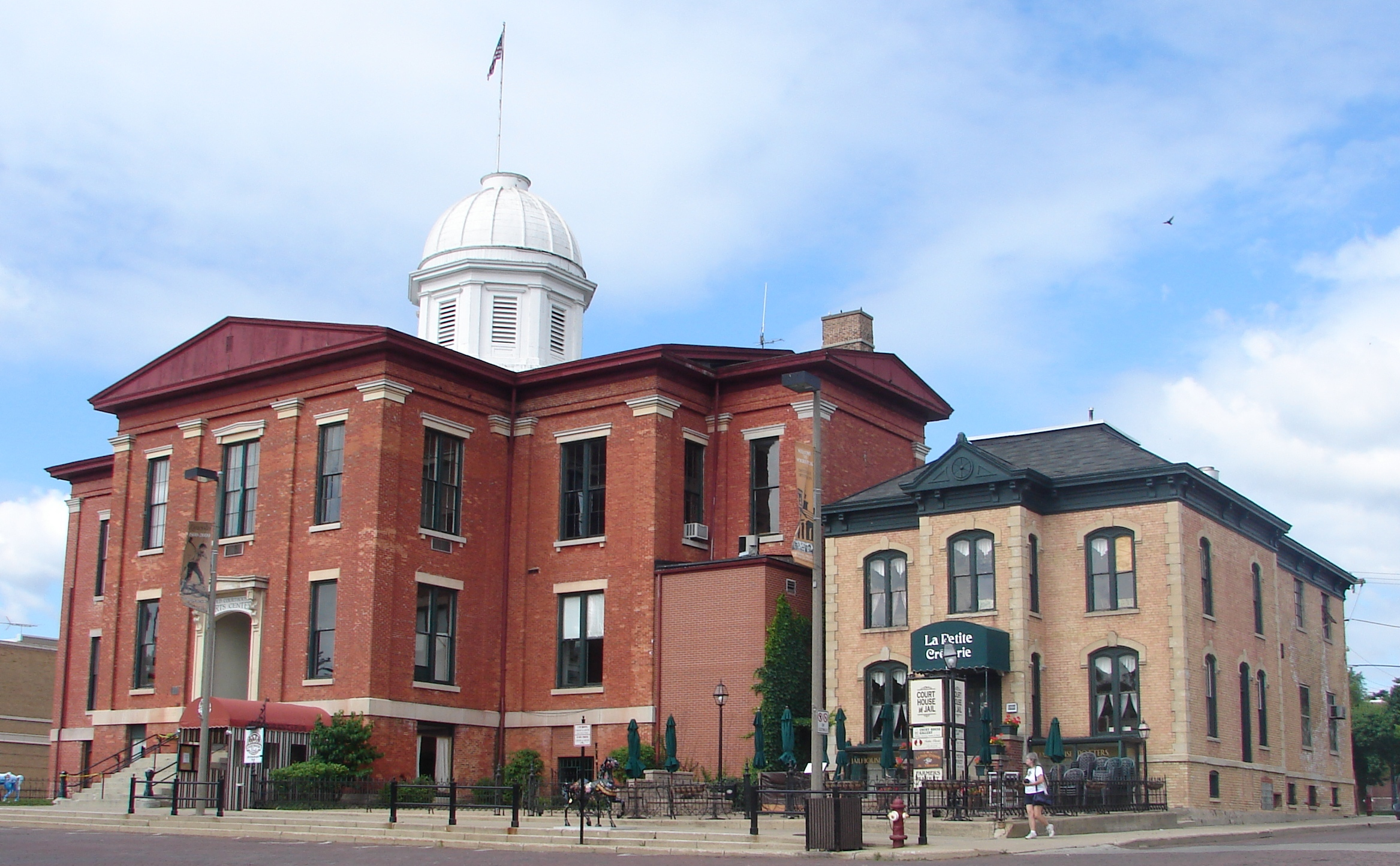
- Old McHenry County Courthouse in Woodstock, Illinois

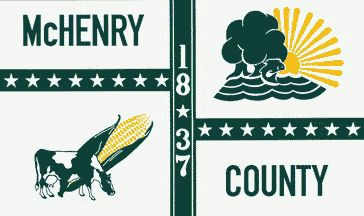
- Flag Seal

- Location within the U.S. state of Illinois
- Coordinates: 42°19′N 88°27′W
- Country: United States
- State: Illinois
- Founded: January 16, 1836
- Named for: William McHenry
- Seat: Woodstock
- Largest city: Crystal Lake

Area
  - Total: 611 sq mi (1,580 km^{2})
  - Land: 603 sq mi (1,560 km^{2})
  - Water: 7.6 sq mi (20 km^{2}) 1.3%

Population (2020)
  - Total: 310,229
  - Estimate (2025): 317,751 ▲
  - Density: 514/sq mi (199/km^{2})
- Time zone: UTC−6 (Central)
  - Summer (DST): UTC−5 (CDT)
- Congressional districts: 9th, 10th, 11th, 16th
- Website: www.mchenrycountyil.gov

McHenry County is located in the U.S. state of Illinois. According to the 2020 Census, it had a population of 310,229, making it the sixth-most populous county in Illinois. Its county seat is Woodstock. McHenry County is one of the five Illinois collar counties in the Chicago metropolitan area. Long known as a center of recreation along with agriculture in the western portion, it has recently experienced rapid rates of suburbanization, exurbanization and urbanization, but the western segment of the county remains primarily agricultural and rural.

== History ==
McHenry County was formed in 1836 out of Cook and LaSalle counties. The county was named for Major William McHenry, a member of the Illinois Militia during Tecumseh's War, a major during the Blackhawk War in 1832, and a member of the Illinois House of Representatives and Senate. He died in Vandalia, Illinois in 1835.

McHenry County originally stretched all the way east to Lake Michigan, with the county seat centrally in McHenry, but in 1839, the eastern townships of the county were carved out forming Lake County.

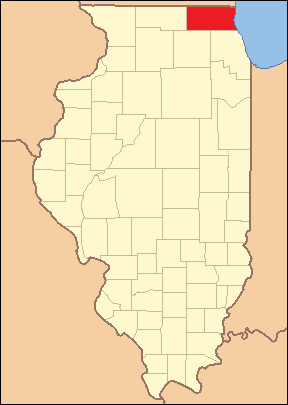
McHenry County at the time of its creation in 1836

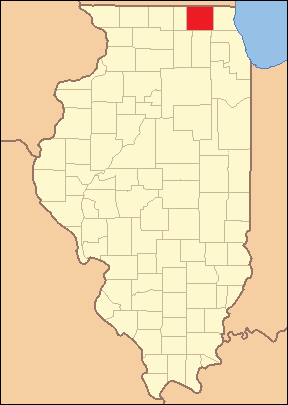
McHenry County was reduced to its current size in 1839 by the creation of Lake County, Illinois.

=== Historical sites ===
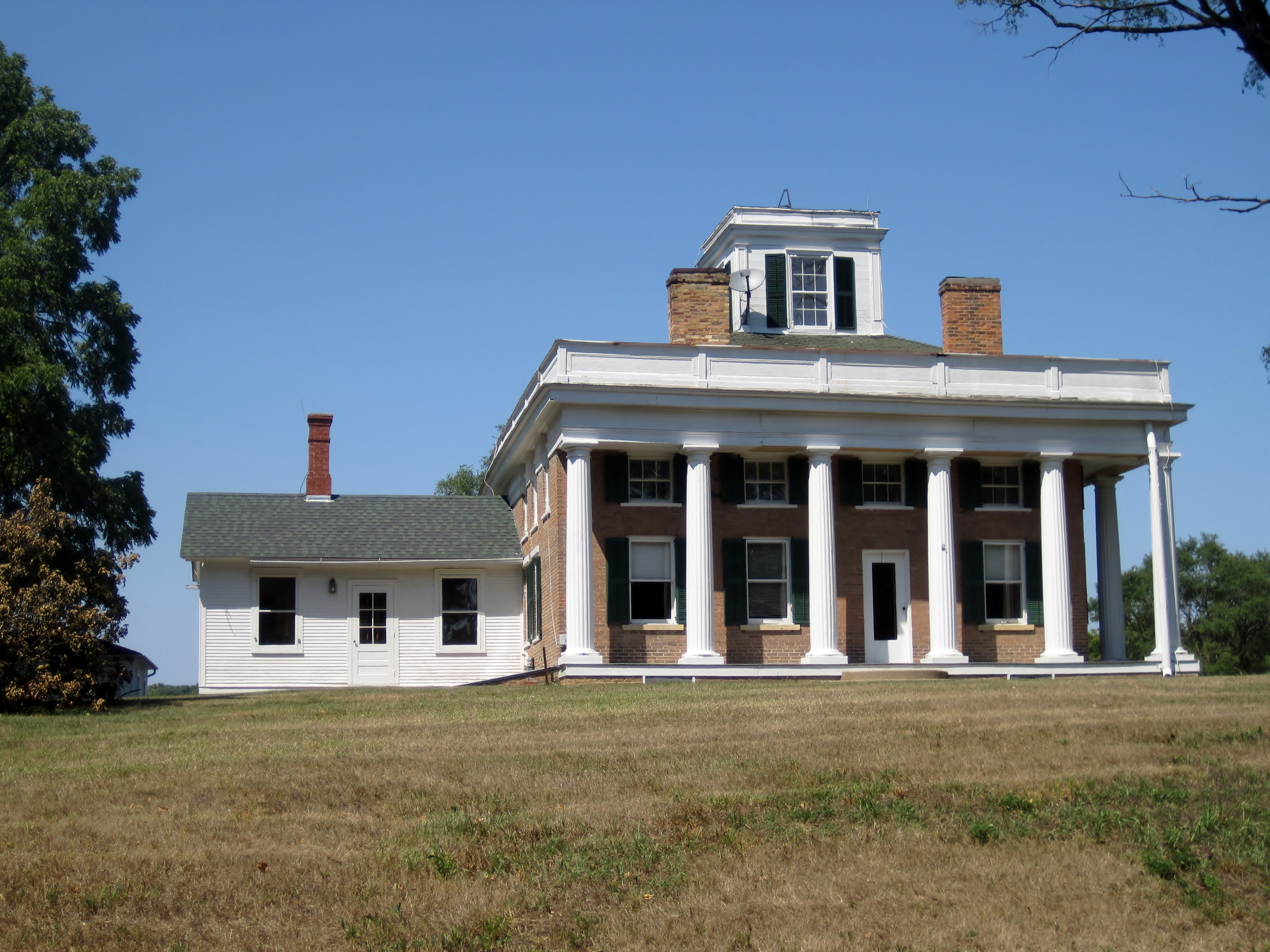
The Terwilliger House is one of several historical sites in McHenry County

- The Count's House, 3803 Waukegan Rd, McHenry
- Charles H. Hibbard House, 413 W Grant Hwy, Marengo
- Col. Gustavus A. Palmer House, 5516 Terra Cotta Rd., Crystal Lake
- Orson Rogers House, 19621 E Grant Hwy, Marengo
- Lucein Boneparte Covell House, 5805 Broadway, Richmond
- Memorial Hall, 10308 Main St, Richmond
- Old McHenry County Courthouse, Woodstock City Square, Woodstock
- Woodstock Opera House, 110 Van Buren St, Woodstock
- Woodstock Square Historic District, Woodstock
- George Stickney House, 1904 Cherry Valley Rd, Bull Valley
- Terwilliger House, Mason Hill Rd & Cherry Valley Rd, Bull Valley

== Geography ==
According to the U.S. Census Bureau, the county has a total area of 611 square miles (1,580 km^{2}), of which 603 square miles (1,560 km^{2}) is land and 7.6 square miles (20 km^{2}) (1.3%) is water.

=== Adjacent counties ===
- Walworth County, Wisconsin - north
- Kenosha County, Wisconsin - northeast
- Lake County - east
- Cook County - southeast
- Kane County - south
- DeKalb County - southwest
- Boone County - west

== Climate and weather ==
Woodstock, Illinois

Climate chart (precipitation, max. and min. temperature)
J	F	M	A	M	J	J	A	S	O	N	D
1.5 28 11	1.3 33 16	2.4 45 26	3.7 59 37	4.1 71 47	4.6 81 57	3.9 85 62	4.5 82 60	3.3 75 51	2.6 63 39	2.7 47 29	2 33 17
- █ Average max. and min. temperatures in °F
- █ Precipitation totals in inches
- Source: The Weather Channel
Metric conversion
J	F	M	A	M	J	J	A	S	O	N	D
38 −2 −12	33 1 −9	61 7 −3	94 15 3	104 22 8	116 27 14	98 29 17	114 28 16	84 24 11	66 17 4	68 8 −2	50 1 −8
- █ Average max. and min. temperatures in °C
- █ Precipitation totals in mm

In recent years, average temperatures in the county seat of Woodstock have ranged from a low of 11 °F (−12 °C) in January to a high of 85 °F (29 °C) in July, although a record low of −29 °F (−34 °C) was recorded in January 1979 and a record high of 109 °F (43 °C) was recorded in July 1936. Average monthly precipitation ranged from 1.29 inches (33 mm) in February to 4.56 inches (116 mm) in June.

McHenry County is like much of the Upper Midwest, as it usually sees hot, humid summers, and cold, snowy winters. The county is notably susceptible to high wind events, blizzards, severe thunderstorms, tornadoes, and flooding.

Some of the most notable weather events in the county include the 1965 Palm Sunday tornado outbreak, the Blizzard of 1967, the 1967 Belvidere - Oak Lawn tornado outbreak, the Blizzard of 1979, the Flood of 1996, the Blizzard of 1999, the Early Winter 2006 North American Storm Complex, the 2007 Midwest flooding event, the January 2008 tornado outbreak sequence, and the Blizzard of 2011.

== Demographics ==
Historical population
Census	Pop.	Note	%±
1840	2,578		—
1850	14,978		481.0%
1860	22,089		47.5%
1870	23,762		7.6%
1880	24,908		4.8%
1890	26,114		4.8%
1900	29,759		14.0%
1910	32,509		9.2%
1920	33,164		2.0%
1930	35,079		5.8%
1940	37,311		6.4%
1950	50,656		35.8%
1960	84,210		66.2%
1970	111,555		32.5%
1980	147,897		32.6%
1990	183,241		23.9%
2000	260,077		41.9%
2010	308,760		18.7%
2020	310,229		0.5%
2025 (est.)	317,751	▲	2.4%
U.S. Decennial Census; 1790-1960 1900-1990; 1990-2000 2010-2019 2020

McHenry county has the highest percentage of non-Hispanic whites amongst the five collar counties of Chicago (McHenry, Lake, DuPage, Kane, and Will) as well as Lake County, Indiana which borders Chicago on the east.

=== Racial and ethnic composition ===
McHenry County, Illinois – Racial and ethnic composition Note: the US Census treats Hispanic/Latino as an ethnic category. This table excludes Latinos from the racial categories and assigns them to a separate category. Hispanics/Latinos may be of any race.
Race / Ethnicity (NH = Non-Hispanic)	Pop 1980	Pop 1990	Pop 2000	Pop 2010	Pop 2020	% 1980	% 1990	% 2000	% 2010	% 2020
White alone (NH)	143,792	175,299	233,026	258,584	238,659	97.22%	95.67%	89.60%	83.75%	76.93%
Black or African American alone (NH)	108	287	1,379	3,045	4,073	0.07%	0.16%	0.53%	0.99%	1.31%
Native American or Alaska Native alone (NH)	145	281	352	455	325	0.10%	0.15%	0.14%	0.15%	0.10%
Asian alone (NH)	551	1,246	3,734	7,712	8,669	0.37%	0.68%	1.44%	2.50%	2.79%
Native Hawaiian or Pacific Islander alone (NH)	x	x	42	68	45	x	x	0.02%	0.02%	0.01%
Other race alone (NH)	276	62	150	210	872	0.19%	0.03%	0.06%	0.07%	0.28%
Mixed race or Multiracial (NH)	x	x	1,792	3,437	10,881	x	x	0.69%	1.11%	3.51%
Hispanic or Latino (any race)	3,025	6,066	19,602	35,249	46,705	2.05%	3.31%	7.54%	11.42%	15.06%
Total	147,897	183,241	260,077	308,760	310,229	100.00%	100.00%	100.00%	100.00%	100.00%

Racial / Ethnic Profile of places in McHenry County, Illinois (2020 Census)
Following is a table of towns and census designated places in NcHenry County, Illinois. Data for the United States (with and without Puerto Rico), the state of Illinois, and McHenry County itself have been included for comparison purposes.
The majority racial/ethnic group is coded per the key below. Communities that extend into and adjacent county or counties are delineated with a ‡ followed by an accompanying explanatory note. The full population of each community has been tabulated including the population in adjacent counties.

Majority minority with no dominant group
Majority White
Majority Black
Majority Hispanic
Majority Asian

Racial and ethnic composition of places in McHenry County, Illinois (2020 Census) (NH = Non-Hispanic) Note: the US Census treats Hispanic/Latino as an ethnic category. This table excludes Latinos from the racial categories and assigns them to a separate category. Hispanics/Latinos may be of any race.
Place	Designation	Total Population	White alone (NH)	%	Black or African American alone (NH)	%	Native American or Alaska Native alone (NH)	%	Asian alone (NH)	%	Pacific Islander alone (NH)	%	Other race alone (NH)	%	Mixed race or Multiracial (NH)	%	Hispanic or Latino (any race)	%
United States of America (50 states and D.C.)	x	331,449,281	191,697,647	57.84%	39,940,338	12.05%	2,251,699	0.68%	19,618,719	5.92%	622,018	0.19%	1,689,833	0.51%	13,548,983	4.09%	62,080,044	18.73%
United States of America (50 states, D.C., and Puerto Rico)	x	334,735,155	191,722,195	57.28%	39,944,624	11.93%	2,252,011	0.67%	19,621,465	5.86%	622,109	0.19%	1,692,341	0.51%	13,551,323	4.05%	65,329,087	19.52%
Illinois	State	12,812,508	7,472,751	58.32%	1,775,612	13.86%	16,561	0.13%	747,280	5.83%	2,959	0.02%	45,080	0.35%	414,855	3.24%	2,337,410	18.24%
McHenry County	County	310,229	238,659	76.93%	4,073	1.31%	325	0.10%	8,669	2.79%	45	0.01%	872	0.28%	10,881	3.51%	46,705	15.06%
Alden	CDP	113	102	90.27%	0	0.00%	0	0.00%	0	0.00%	0	0.00%	1	0.88%	5	4.42%	5	4.42%
Algonquin ‡	Village	29,700	22,327	75.18%	704	2.37%	27	0.09%	2,143	7.22%	7	0.02%	85	0.29%	1,048	3.53%	3,359	11.31%
Barrington Hills ‡	Village	4,114	3,369	81.89%	39	0.95%	4	0.10%	348	8.46%	0	0.00%	18	0.44%	124	3.01%	212	5.15%
Big Foot Prairie	CDP	65	28	43.08%	0	0.00%	0	0.00%	1	1.54%	0	0.00%	0	0.00%	2	3.08%	34	52.31%
Bull Valley	Village	1,128	1,002	88.83%	2	0.18%	2	0.18%	17	1.51%	0	0.00%	1	0.09%	46	4.08%	58	5.14%
Burtons Bridge	CDP	226	170	75.22%	9	3.98%	0	0.00%	2	0.88%	1	0.44%	2	0.88%	8	3.54%	34	15.04%
Cary	Village	17,826	14,417	80.88%	134	0.75%	25	0.14%	516	2.89%	4	0.02%	52	0.29%	8	0.04%	2,100	11.78%
Chemung	CDP	276	179	64.86%	0	0.00%	0	0.00%	0	0.00%	0	0.00%	1	0.36%	6	2.17%	90	32.61%
Coral	CDP	16	10	62.50%	0	0.00%	0	0.00%	0	0.00%	0	0.00%	0	0.00%	0	0.00%	6	37.50%
Crystal Lake	City	40,269	30,976	76.92%	586	1.46%	37	0.09%	1,091	2.71%	3	0.01%	147	0.37%	1,474	3.66%	5,955	14.79%
Fox Lake ‡	Village	10,978	8,748	79.69%	219	1.99%	15	0.14%	134	1.22%	4	0.04%	16	0.15%	456	4.15%	1,386	12.63%
Fox River Grove ‡	Village	4,702	3,866	82.22%	36	0.77%	3	0.06%	188	4.00%	0	0.00%	18	0.38%	202	4.30%	389	8.27%
Franklinville	CDP	38	33	86.84%	0	0.00%	0	0.00%	0	0.00%	0	0.00%	0	0.00%	4	10.53%	1	2.63%
Greenwood	Village	324	258	79.63%	2	0.62%	1	0.31%	1	0.31%	0	0.00%	1	0.31%	9	2.78%	52	16.05%
Harmony	CDP	20	14	70.00%	0	0.00%	0	0.00%	0	0.00%	0	0.00%	0	0.00%	3	15.00%	3	15.00%
Hartland	CDP	157	126	80.25%	4	2.55%	0	0.00%	0	0.00%	0	0.00%	4	2.55%	6	3.82%	17	10.83%
Harvard	City	9,469	3,885	41.03%	55	0.58%	4	0.04%	75	0.79%	0	0.00%	17	0.18%	219	2.31%	5,214	55.06%
Hebron	Village	1,368	1,067	78.00%	7	0.51%	1	0.07%	2	0.15%	0	0.00%	6	0.44%	47	3.44%	238	17.40%
Holiday Hills	Village	618	509	82.36%	1	0.16%	0	0.00%	1	0.16%	0	0.00%	1	0.16%	28	4.53%	78	12.62%
Huntley ‡	Village	27,740	22,223	80.11%	450	1.62%	24	0.09%	1,516	5.47%	1	0.00%	60	0.22%	883	3.18%	2,583	9.31%
Island Lake ‡	Village	8,051	6,137	76.23%	96	1.19%	10	0.12%	159	1.97%	1	0.01%	21	0.26%	299	3.71%	1,328	16.49%
Johnsburg	Village	6,355	5,684	89.44%	22	0.35%	6	0.09%	54	0.85%	0	0.00%	10	0.16%	253	3.98%	326	5.13%
Lake in the Hills	Village	28,982	20,856	71.96%	659	2.27%	32	0.11%	1,637	5.65%	9	0.03%	88	0.30%	996	3.44%	4,705	16.23%
Lakemoor ‡	Village	6,182	4,568	73.89%	149	2.41%	6	0.10%	166	2.69%	0	0.00%	20	0.32%	241	3.90%	1,032	16.69%
Lakewood	Village	4,283	3,699	86.36%	25	0.58%	7	0.16%	153	3.57%	0	0.00%	9	0.21%	178	4.16%	212	4.95%
Lawrence	CDP	220	159	72.27%	6	2.73%	0	0.00%	2	0.91%	0	0.00%	0	0.00%	11	5.00%	42	19.09%
Marengo	City	7,568	5,758	76.08%	94	1.24%	20	0.26%	51	0.67%	0	0.00%	16	0.21%	248	3.28%	1,381	18.25%
McCullom Lake	Village	988	750	75.91%	7	0.71%	0	0.00%	16	1.62%	0	0.00%	0	0.00%	49	4.96%	166	16.80%
McHenry	City	27,135	21,144	77.92%	280	1.03%	20	0.07%	493	1.82%	4	0.01%	40	0.15%	954	3.52%	4,200	15.48%
Oakwood Hills	Village	2,076	1,731	83.38%	15	0.72%	4	0.19%	29	1.40%	3	0.14%	13	0.63%	93	4.48%	188	9.06%
Pistakee Highlands	CDP	3,237	2,805	86.65%	22	0.68%	6	0.19%	18	0.56%	0	0.00%	6	0.19%	123	3.80%	257	7.94%
Port Barrington ‡	Village	1,584	1,257	79.36%	17	1.07%	2	0.13%	99	6.25%	1	0.06%	5	0.32%	44	2.78%	159	10.04%
Prairie Grove	Village	1,963	1,698	86.50%	12	0.61%	3	0.15%	84	4.28%	0	0.00%	11	0.56%	50	2.55%	105	5.35%
Richmond	Village	2,089	1,798	86.07%	29	1.39%	1	0.05%	28	1.34%	0	0.00%	4	0.19%	72	3.45%	157	7.52%
Ridgefield	CDP	210	193	91.90%	0	0.00%	0	0.00%	0	0.00%	1	0.48%	0	0.00%	2	0.95%	14	6.67%
Riley	CDP	10	8	80.00%	0	0.00%	0	0.00%	0	0.00%	0	0.00%	0	0.00%	1	10.00%	1	10.00%
Ringwood	Village	844	741	87.80%	12	1.42%	0	0.00%	6	0.71%	0	0.00%	0	0.00%	39	4.62%	46	5.45%
Solon Mills	CDP	133	111	83.46%	0	0.00%	1	0.75%	0	0.00%	0	0.00%	0	0.00%	10	7.52%	11	8.27%
Spring Grove	Village	5,487	4,955	90.30%	22	0.40%	4	0.07%	47	0.86%	0	0.00%	7	0.13%	174	3.17%	278	5.07%
Trout Valley	Village	515	466	90.49%	3	0.58%	2	0.39%	2	0.39%	0	0.00%	0	0.00%	18	3.50%	24	4.66%
Union	Village	551	481	87.30%	0	0.00%	0	0.00%	6	1.09%	0	0.00%	0	0.00%	16	2.90%	48	8.71%
Wonder Lake	Village	3,973	3,301	83.09%	26	0.65%	11	0.28%	30	0.76%	2	0.05%	11	0.28%	137	3.45%	455	11.45%
Woodstock	City	25,630	16,456	64.21%	737	2.88%	33	0.13%	527	2.06%	2	0.01%	106	0.41%	860	3.36%	6,909	26.96%

=== 2020 census ===
As of the 2020 census, the county had a population of 310,229, a median age of 40.8 years, and 23.0% of residents under the age of 18 while 15.6% were 65 years of age or older. For every 100 females there were 98.9 males, and for every 100 females age 18 and over there were 97.2 males age 18 and over.

The racial makeup of the county was 79.9% White, 1.4% Black or African American, 0.5% American Indian and Alaska Native, 2.8% Asian, less than 0.1% Native Hawaiian and Pacific Islander, 6.3% from some other race, and 9.1% from two or more races, with Hispanic or Latino residents of any race comprising 15.1% of the population.

Eighty-five point nine percent of residents lived in urban areas, while 14.1% lived in rural areas.

There were 114,282 households in the county, of which 33.4% had children under the age of 18 living in them, 58.0% were married-couple households, 14.8% were households with a male householder and no spouse or partner present, and 20.6% were households with a female householder and no spouse or partner present.

About 21.7% of all households were made up of individuals and 9.5% had someone living alone who was 65 years of age or older. There were 119,708 housing units, of which 4.5% were vacant, 80.7% of occupied units were owner-occupied, and 19.3% were renter-occupied, with a homeowner vacancy rate of 1.4% and a rental vacancy rate of 5.6%.

=== 2010 census ===
As of the 2010 census, there were 308,760 people, 109,199 households, and 82,288 families residing in the county. The population density was 511.9 inhabitants per square mile (197.6/km^{2}). There were 116,040 housing units at an average density of 192.4 per square mile (74.3/km^{2}). The racial makeup of the county was 90.1% white, 2.5% Asian, 1.1% black or African American, 0.3% American Indian, 4.3% from other races, and 1.7% from two or more races. Those of Hispanic or Latino origin made up 11.4% of the population. In terms of ancestry, 34.4% were of German heritage, 18.7% were of Irish ancestry, 14.2% Polish, 10.8% Italian, 7.8% English, and 3.7% of American heritage.

Of the 109,199 households, 40.1% had children under the age of 18 living with them, 62.3% were married couples living together, 8.9% had a female householder with no husband present, 24.6% were non-families, and 19.8% of all households were made up of individuals. The average household size was 2.81 and the average family size was 3.25. The median age was 38.0 years.

The median income for a household in the county was $76,482 and the median income for a family was $86,698. Males had a median income of $61,971 versus $42,125 for females. The per capita income for the county was $31,838. About 4.9% of families and 6.2% of the population were below the poverty line, including 8.3% of those under age 18 and 4.6% of those age 65 or over.

== Communities ==
=== Cities ===
- Crystal Lake
- Harvard
- Marengo
- McHenry
- Woodstock (county seat)

=== Villages ===
- Algonquin (mostly)
- Barrington Hills (part)
- Bull Valley
- Cary
- Fox Lake (part)
- Fox River Grove (part)
- Greenwood
- Hebron
- Holiday Hills
- Huntley (part)
- Island Lake (part)
- Johnsburg
- Lake in the Hills
- Lakemoor (part)
- Lakewood
- McCullom Lake
- Oakwood Hills
- Port Barrington (part)
- Prairie Grove
- Richmond
- Ringwood
- Spring Grove
- Trout Valley
- Union
- Wonder Lake

=== Census-designated places ===
- Alden
- Big Foot Prairie
- Burtons Bridge
- Chemung
- Coral
- Franklinville
- Harmony
- Hartland
- Lawrence
- Pistakee Highlands
- Ridgefield
- Riley
- Solon Mills

Before the 2020 Census, only Chemung and Pistakee Highlands were CDPs.

=== Unincorporated communities ===
- Belden
- Palm Beach (part)
- Terra Cotta

=== Townships ===
- Alden
- Algonquin
- Burton
- Chemung
- Coral
- Dorr
- Dunham
- Grafton
- Greenwood
- Hartland
- Hebron
- Marengo
- McHenry
- Nunda
- Richmond
- Riley
- Seneca

== Government ==
McHenry County government is based primarily out of Woodstock, the county seat. The McHenry County Government Center, located on the north end of Woodstock along Illinois Route 47, features county offices as well as judicial facilities.

The current Chairman of the McHenry County Board is Michael Buehler, who was first elected in 2020.

The current Sheriff of McHenry County, Illinois is Robb Tadelmann, who was first elected in 2022.

=== Politics ===
As one of the Yankee-settled and prosperous outer suburban "collar counties", McHenry County was a stronghold of the Free Soil Party in its first few elections, being one of nine Illinois counties to give a plurality to Martin van Buren in 1848. McHenry County has voted for the Republican candidate for president in all but two elections since 1852 (the Republican party was founded in 1854), the first being when "Bull Moose" candidate and former Republican president Theodore Roosevelt won the county in 1912. Recent elections in 2004 and 2000 saw George W. Bush capture 59.72% and 58.5% of the county vote, respectively.

In 2008, Democratic U.S. presidential candidate Barack Obama, then a Senator from Illinois, captured McHenry County with 52% of the vote—the first time a Democrat had carried the county since 1852. In the 2012 presidential election, Obama only received 44% of the vote whereas Republican Mitt Romney captured 53% of the vote. In the 2016 presidential election, Republican Donald Trump received 50% of the vote whereas Democratic Hillary Clinton received 42% of the vote. In 2020, Joe Biden came within 3% of carrying the county for the Democrats for the second time since 1852. McHenry County is now the only collar county that still leans Republican.

The 2026 Illinois elections marked a notable change in McHenry County's political landscape, as Democrats achieved historic gains in a region with a long history of Republican majorities. In the gubernatorial election, McHenry County voted for Democratic incumbent JB Pritzker, making him the first Democratic governor to win the county since 1852. The county also voted for Juliana Stratton, a Democratic progressive who ran for the U.S. Senate. Pritzker and Stratton both won the county by more than 10 points, winning 53.2% and 54.7% of the vote respectively.

United States presidential election results for McHenry County, Illinois
Year	Republican		Democratic		Third party(ies)	
Year	No.	%	No.	%	No.	%
1892	3,205	55.16%	2,311	39.78%	294	5.06%
1896	5,047	70.91%	1,913	26.88%	157	2.21%
1900	5,234	70.09%	2,076	27.80%	158	2.12%
1904	5,409	77.21%	1,309	18.68%	288	4.11%
1908	5,331	71.07%	1,887	25.16%	283	3.77%
1912	2,370	31.82%	1,913	25.69%	3,164	42.49%
1916	9,024	72.00%	3,278	26.15%	231	1.84%
1920	9,885	85.10%	1,536	13.22%	195	1.68%
1924	8,751	67.24%	1,372	10.54%	2,892	22.22%
1928	10,661	65.33%	5,596	34.29%	62	0.38%
1932	9,880	53.14%	8,260	44.42%	454	2.44%
1936	12,031	60.56%	6,893	34.70%	942	4.74%
1940	16,480	72.30%	6,170	27.07%	145	0.64%
1944	15,666	73.55%	5,567	26.14%	66	0.31%
1948	15,387	73.45%	5,459	26.06%	103	0.49%
1952	20,975	74.23%	7,218	25.54%	64	0.23%
1956	24,912	78.34%	6,820	21.45%	66	0.21%
1960	25,787	66.97%	12,659	32.87%	62	0.16%
1964	22,503	55.54%	18,014	44.46%	0	0.00%
1968	27,245	66.15%	10,896	26.46%	3,044	7.39%
1972	36,114	74.75%	12,090	25.02%	108	0.22%
1976	37,115	67.50%	16,799	30.55%	1,075	1.95%
1980	40,045	64.95%	14,540	23.58%	7,070	11.47%
1984	47,282	76.21%	14,420	23.24%	340	0.55%
1988	46,135	70.44%	18,919	28.88%	445	0.68%
1992	41,356	46.84%	24,783	28.07%	22,155	25.09%
1996	41,136	49.41%	31,240	37.52%	10,880	13.07%
2000	62,112	58.49%	40,698	38.33%	3,375	3.18%
2004	76,412	59.72%	50,330	39.34%	1,206	0.94%
2008	64,845	46.44%	72,288	51.77%	2,499	1.79%
2012	71,598	53.34%	59,797	44.55%	2,842	2.12%
2016	71,612	49.75%	60,803	42.24%	11,515	8.00%
2020	82,260	49.98%	78,154	47.49%	4,164	2.53%
2024	83,933	51.47%	75,370	46.22%	3,779	2.32%

== Education ==
McHenry County College, a growing community college established in 1967, serves the majority of county residents. The college includes 2,000 full-time students and 5,800 part-time students. The main campus is located on the northwest side of Crystal Lake, along U.S. Route 14. Secondary facilities exist in Crystal Lake and McHenry.

McHenry County also includes dozens of school districts. This is a list of high schools that can be found in the county:

Public High Schools in McHenry County
Name of School	School District	Enrollment (2018–19)	Athletic Conference	Team Mascot	City
Alden-Hebron High School	Alden-Hebron School District #19	110	Northeastern Athletic Conference	Giants	Hebron
Cary-Grove High School	Community High School District 155	1,644	Fox Valley Conference	Trojans	Cary
Crystal Lake Central High School	Community High School District 155	1,477	Fox Valley Conference	Tigers	Crystal Lake
Crystal Lake South High School	Community High School District 155	1,480	Fox Valley Conference	Gators	Crystal Lake
Harry D. Jacobs High School	Community Unit School District 300	2,089	Fox Valley Conference	Golden Eagles	Algonquin
Harvard High School	Community Unit School District 50	740	Kishwaukee River Conference	Hornets	Harvard
Huntley High School	Consolidated School District 158	3,082	Fox Valley Conference	Red Raiders	Huntley
Johnsburg High School	Johnsburg District 12	593	Kishwaukee River Conference	Skyhawks	Johnsburg
Marengo Community High School	Marengo Community High School District 154	665	Kishwaukee River Conference	Indians	Marengo
McHenry East High School	McHenry Community High School District 156	700	Fox Valley Conference	Warriors	McHenry
McHenry West High School	McHenry Community High School District 156	1,443	Fox Valley Conference	Warriors	McHenry
Prairie Ridge High School	Community High School District 155	1,371	Fox Valley Conference	Wolves	Crystal Lake
Richmond-Burton Community High School	Richmond-Burton High School District 157	636	Kishwaukee River Conference	Rockets	Richmond
Woodstock High School	Woodstock Community Unit School District 200	1,008	Kishwaukee River Conference	Blue Streaks	Woodstock
Woodstock North High School	Woodstock Community Unit School District 200	949	Kishwaukee River Conference	Thunder	Woodstock

Students in McHenry County may also be zoned into schools in other counties, such as Dundee-Crown High School in neighboring Carpentersville.

Private High Schools in McHenry County
Name of School	Religious Affiliation	Enrollment	Athletic Conference	Team Mascot	City
Marian Central Catholic High School	Roman Catholic	590	East Suburban Catholic Conference	Hurricanes	Woodstock

== Medical facilities ==
Hospitals currently operating in the county include Mercyhealth Harvard Hospital, Northwestern Medicine McHenry Hospital in McHenry, Northwestern Medicine Woodstock Hospital in Woodstock, Northwestern Medicine Huntley Hospital, and Mercyhealth Hospital and Physician Clinic in Crystal Lake. Amita (formerly Presence) and Advocate health systems also maintain a strong influence in the county, and have hospitals in nearby Elgin, IL and Barrington, IL. On September 1, 2018, Centegra was acquired by Northwestern Medicine. Prior to its acquisition by Northwestern Medicine, Centegra was the largest independent employer in McHenry County. It is now part of a network of more than 10 hospitals and 400 care locations.

Mercyhealth Hospital and Physician Clinic in Crystal Lake, IL opened in 2023, and is the newest hospital to be built in McHenry County. The hospital has 13 inpatient beds, an emergency department, and an intensive care unit.

== Economy ==
Much of McHenry County's economy centers around manufacturing, metalworking, media development and printing, transportation equipment, agriculture, health care, education, retail, food production, distribution, and technology. Gravel mining makes up a sizable portion of the county's economy.

The major employment centers can be found in Crystal Lake, Algonquin, Huntley, McHenry, and Woodstock. The southern portions of the county are within the scope of the Golden Corridor, the region of commerce along the Jane Addams Memorial Tollway.

=== Shopping ===
The county is known for its wide variety of shopping options. McHenry, Crystal Lake, and Algonquin/Lake in the Hills have established themselves as major retail areas, all featuring an array of big box stores, specialty stores, and restaurants. While there are no major malls located within the county, several lie just outside its borders: the lifestyle centers Algonquin Commons and Algonquin Galleria, and the regional indoor mall Spring Hill Mall in West Dundee.

In addition, several historic downtowns throughout the county offer unique shops and eateries in charming environments. The Woodstock Square Historic District, antique shops in Richmond and Hebron, downtown Crystal Lake and downtown Algonquin, and shops in other historic downtowns throughout the county accommodate residents and tourists alike. McHenry's Green Street is also a major attraction in the county.

== Recreation ==
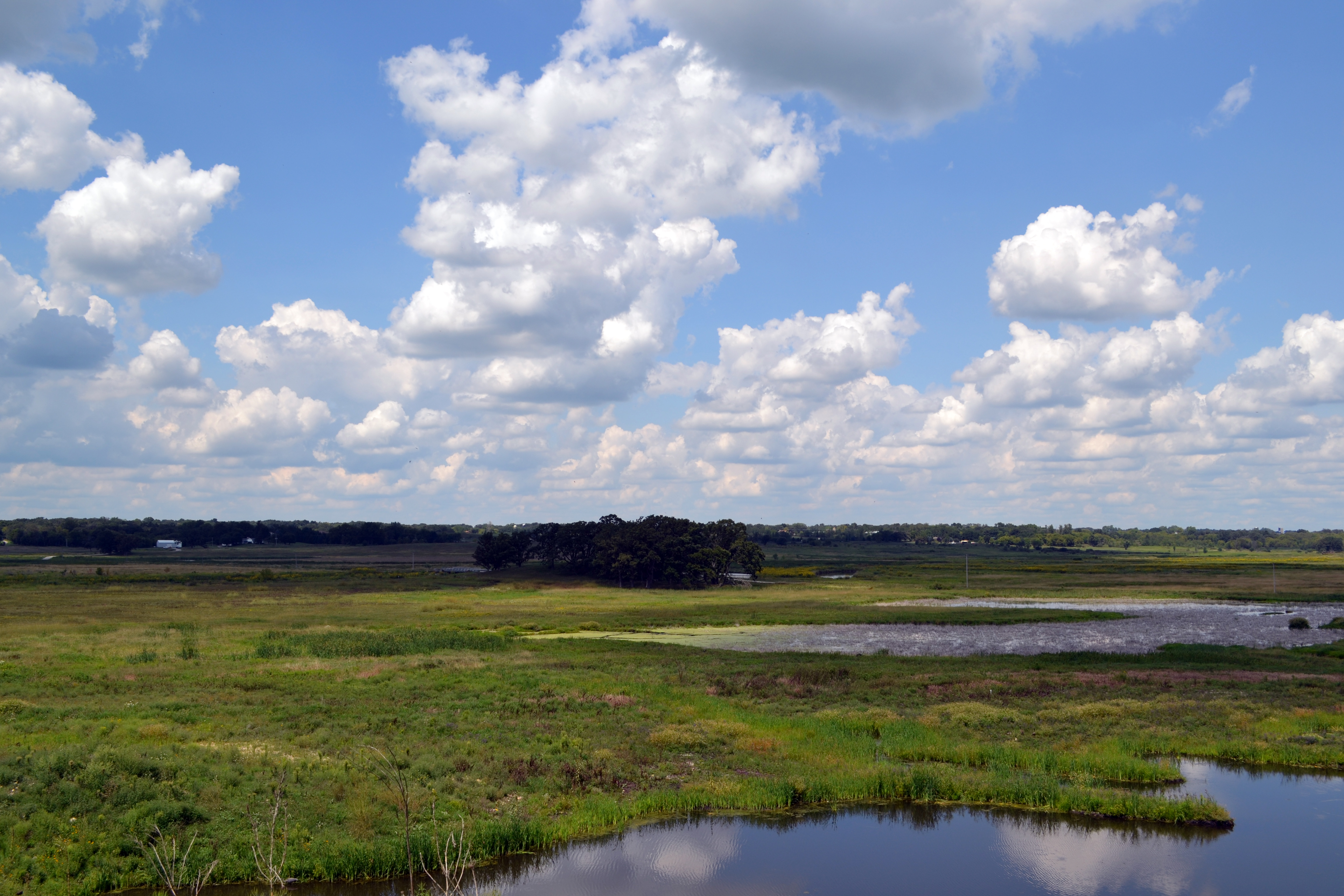
Glacial Park, located in Northeast McHenry County

The entire county is served by the McHenry County Conservation District, which preserves sensitive land throughout the county and provides recreational opportunities for residents. The District also operates the McHenry County Prairie Path, a regional bike path that extends from the Wisconsin State Line in Richmond southward to Algonquin, where the path connects with the Fox River Bike Trail, which continues south to Aurora.

In addition, the Fox River, Kishwaukee River and Chain O'Lakes provide immense opportunities for boating, fishing, swimming, and other water activities. Moraine Hills State Park and Chain O' Lakes State Park are both located in the county, adjacent to the waterway. Other major lakes in the county include Crystal Lake, Wonder Lake, and McCullom Lake.

There are also dozens of parks, golf courses, and country clubs throughout the county. Major skiing areas include Nordic Ski Jump in Fox River Grove and Buffalo Snowboarding Park in Algonquin. In addition, the Windy City Balloon Port in Fox River Grove offers hot air balloon rides over the Fox River Valley.

In 2012, the Hackmatack National Wildlife Refuge was established and encompasses parts of McHenry County.

== Culture ==
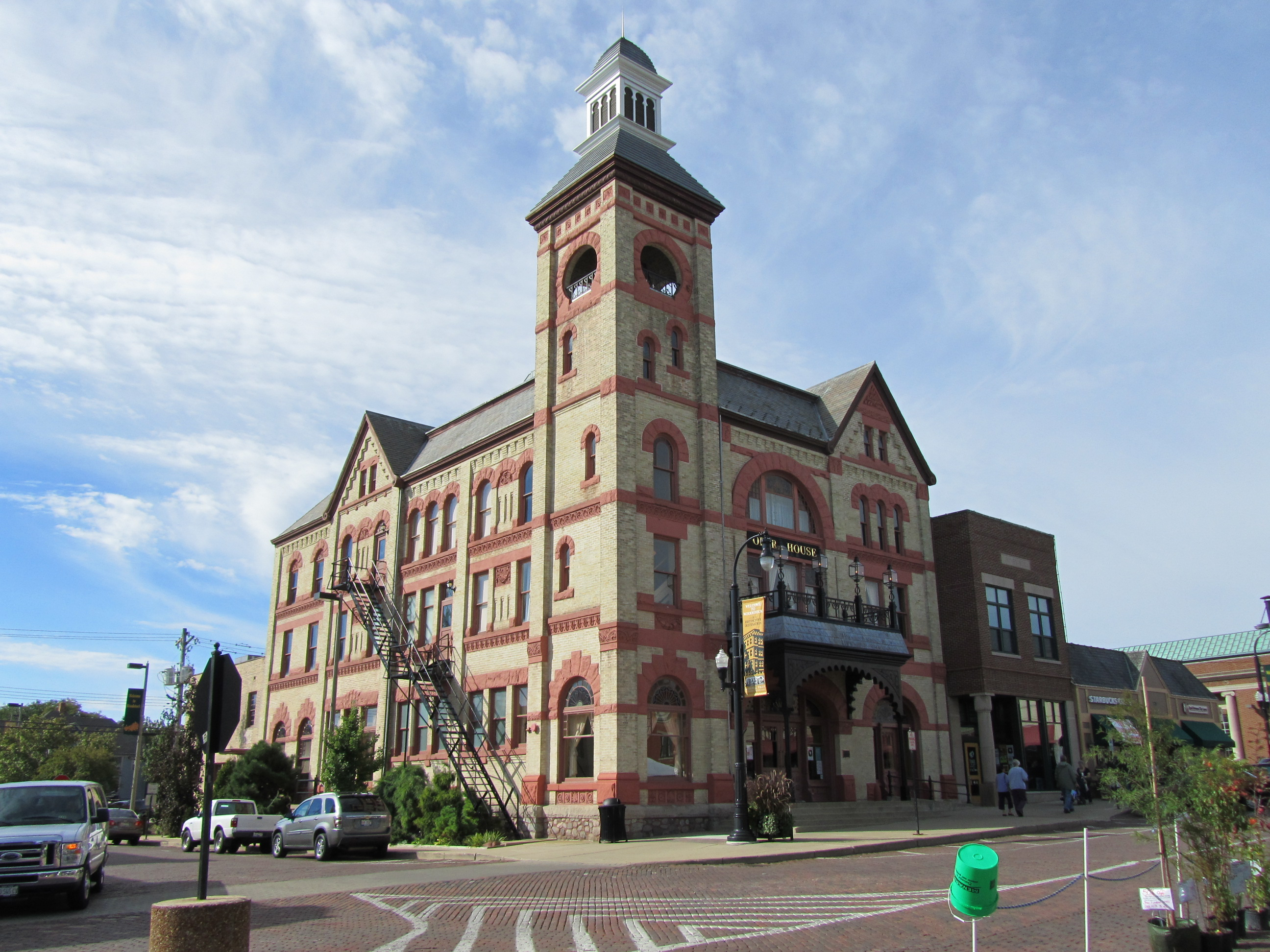
Woodstock Opera House

McHenry County has an active art and theater scene. The historic Woodstock Opera House and Crystal Lake's Raue Center for the Arts both provide exceptional programs. In addition, Algonquin is noted for its Public Art Program, which showcases artwork year-round throughout the community. The county is also ideal for photography and filming. Much of the filming for the 1993 movie Groundhog Day took place in Woodstock.

There are also several important points of interest in the county including the Illinois Railway Museum and McHenry County Historical Museum in Union, the Old McHenry County Courthouse in Woodstock, and a variety of historical homes including the Orson Rogers House, George Stickney House, Charles H. Hibbard House, the Terwilliger House, the Count's House, and the Dole Mansion.

Throughout the year are a variety of festivals throughout the county, the centerpiece of which is the McHenry County Fair, occurring during a week in August in Woodstock. Many towns also have their own festivals throughout the year. Some of the most notable ones are the Ground Hog Days and the Great Lake Steelpan Festival in Woodstock, Fall Fest in Huntley, the Summer Sunset Festival in Lake in the Hills, the Lakeside Festival in Crystal Lake, Milk Days in Harvard, Settler's Days in Marengo, Cary Days in Cary, Founders Days in Algonquin, and Fiesta Days in McHenry.

== Transportation ==
=== Major highways ===
- Interstate 90
- U.S. Highway 12
- U.S. Highway 14
- U.S. Highway 20
- Illinois Route 22
- Illinois Route 23
- Illinois Route 31
- Illinois Route 47
- Illinois Route 62
- Illinois Route 120
- Illinois Route 173
- Illinois Route 176
- Lake Cook Road
- Randall Road

Several Federal and state highways run through McHenry County, including U.S. Highway 20, U.S. Highway 14, U.S. Highway 12, Illinois Route 22, Illinois Route 23, Illinois Route 173, Illinois Route 120, Illinois Route 176, Illinois Route 47, Illinois Route 31, and Illinois Route 62. Highly traveled county highways include Randall Road, Algonquin Road, Rakow Road, and Walkup Road.

McHenry County was the most populous county in the United States without direct access to an Interstate Highway within its borders. As a result, residents usually used the nearby Interstate 90 (the Jane Addams Memorial Tollway), via interchanges in neighboring Kane County. But a new interchange is now completed at I-90 and Illinois Route 23, which provides McHenry County with direct access to the interstate highway system.

Interstate 94 lies to the east of McHenry County in Lake County, Illinois.

=== Mass transportation ===
McHenry County is served by Metra Rail, which provides daily commuter service to and from downtown Chicago. There are seven stations in the county, all of them located along the Union Pacific Northwest Line. The county is also served by Pace, which provides four fixed bus routes (550, 806, 807, and 808), and MCRide Dial-A-Ride transit service operated by Pace and First Transit. Those who receive an NITA Reduced Fare, Ride Free or ADA Paratransit Permit can also apply for MCRide Connect, a local version of the Rideshare Access Program (RAP) that provides vouchers for rides on either Uber or UZURV as long as either the pick-up, destination or both are in the county.

=== Airports ===
Lake in the Hills Airport offers general aviation service, as do Dacy Airport and Galt Airport, in the northern part of the county. Chicago-O'Hare International Airport is approximately 30 to 40 miles (48 to 64 km) from the county, while Milwaukee's Milwaukee Mitchell International Airport is approximately 50 to 60 miles (80 to 97 km) away. Chicago Rockford International Airport, a busy cargo airport with limited, scheduled passenger service is located approximately 42 miles (68 km) west of the central part of the county (Woodstock).

== Media ==
McHenry County is entirely within the scope of the Chicago media market and the majority of the county relies primarily on Chicago television stations, radio stations, and newspapers for the source of its news and information. Certain sections of the county, particularly the rural far northern and far western parts, are also within the scope of the Milwaukee and Rockford media markets, respectively.

The county has an FM radio station, WZSR (Star 105.5 FM), which plays mostly adult contemporary and pop music. WZSR is based out of Crystal Lake.

The Northwest Herald, with a circulation of approximately 21,000, is the county's primary newspaper, serving the greater McHenry County area, and printed and published in Crystal Lake.

Lake and McHenry County Scanner, launched in 2012 by Sam Borcia, is a local digital newspaper which covers McHenry County and nearby Lake County, Illinois.

The county is also served by the larger Chicago newspapers Chicago Tribune, Chicago Sun-Times, and the suburban-focused newspaper The Daily Herald.

McHenry County Living, a bimonthly lifestyle magazine serving the county, reaches tens of thousands of area residents and businesses.

== See also ==
- National Register of Historic Places listings in McHenry County, Illinois
