= Ridgefield =

Ridgefield may refer to:

== Places ==
- Ridgefield, Connecticut, a New England town
  - Ridgefield (CDP), Connecticut, a village in the town of Ridgefield
  - Ridgefield Playhouse, a theater located in Ridgefield
- Ridgefield, Illinois
- Ridgefield, New Jersey
- Ridgefield Park, New Jersey
- Ridgefield Township, New Jersey
- Ridgefield, Washington, a city in Clark County, Washington
- Ridgefield Township, Huron County, Ohio

== Other uses ==
- Battle of Ridgefield, a battle in the American Revolution
- Ridgefield High School
