= Prairie Ridge High School =

Location
- 6000 Dvorak Drive; Crystal Lake, Illinois 60012; United States; 42.27022°N 88.31411°W

Information
- Type: Public High School
- Established: 1997
- Oversight: Community High School District 155
- Dean: Amy Langelund & Haley Roeder
- Principal: Steven Koch
- Teaching staff: 72.84 (FTE)
- Grades: 9-12
- Enrollment: 1,138 (2023-2024)
- Student to teacher ratio: 15.62
- Colors: Silver; Maroon
- Mascot: Wolves
- Website: Prairie Ridge High School
- Prairie Ridge High School as seen from satellite

Prairie Ridge High School, often referred to as "PR," is the newest public high school in Community High School District 155 in Crystal Lake, Illinois, United States. The other three high school in the area include Crystal Lake Central, Crystal Lake South, and Cary-Grove. Prairie Ridge High school opened in 1997 to address the overpopulation of the three area high schools.

In addition to Crystal Lake's areas with the 60012 zip code, Prairie Ridge also accepts students from the Northern and Eastern areas of Crystal Lake with the 60014 zipcode, along with Prairie Grove, Oakwood Hills, Burtons Bridge, Ridgefield, and small portions of McHenry, Cary, and Bull Valley. Prior to opening its doors, the first graduating class of students was allowed to vote on the name, colors, and song for the new high school. The district approved the name, and Prairie Ridge was born. As of the 2017–2018 school year, Prairie Ridge is the smallest high school in District 155.

== Academics ==
The four-year graduation rate of Prairie Ridge for the 2020-21 school year was 98%, which is above the district average of 96% and the state average of 88%. For the 2018 graduating class, 80% of 362 students continued their education into either a community college or a 4-year university, and the most popular choices are McHenry County College (97), Iowa State University (12), Illinois State University (10), University of Iowa (10), and University of Illinois (9).

Prairie Ridge offers over 200 courses including Advanced Placement (AP), Project Lead the Way (PLTW), and Dual Credit. It offers PLTW courses in Introduction to Engineering Design, Principles of Engineering, Digital Electronics, and Engineering Design and Development. It also offers AP courses. In addition to these AP classes, Prairie Ridge offers 6 Dual Credit courses (Autos II, Computer Business Applications, Culinary Arts II Commercial, Good Boys Production Management, Marketing, Music Appreciation, and Spanish IV) in conjunction with McHenry County College and 1 Dual Credit course (Calculus III) in conjunction with the University of Illinois.

In the 2017–2018 school year, Prairie Ridge students took 823 AP exams, and 647 of them resulted in college credit (needing a score of 3 or better) for a pass rate of 78.6%. For the same year, Prairie Ridge's SAT averages were 502.6 for the English Language Arts section and 560.6 for the Mathematics section, both of which are above the district average and state average. This also indicates a 50% proficiency rate in the English Language Arts section and a 51% rate of proficiency in Mathematics.

== Athletics ==
Prairie Ridge competes in the Fox Valley Conference, which is a member of the Illinois High School Association (IHSA). Boys swimming co-ops with Cary-Grove, CL Central, and CL South. Girls swimming co-ops with CL Central and CL South.

The baseball team won the 2007-08 IHSA State Championship. The Football team has 3 Class 6A state titles: in 2011 with a 13–1 record and twice more in back to back state championships in 2016 and 2017 with a cumulative win streak of 28 games. The Boys' Soccer Team won the 1999–2000 IHSA State Championship. The Boys' Wrestling Team has had two state champions, David Vinton in 2009–2010, and Travis Piotrowski in 2015–2016.

== Notable alumni ==
- Jared Boll, Professional NHL hockey player with the Anaheim Ducks and formerly the Columbus Blue Jackets
- Kevin Kaczmarski, Major League Baseball player with the New York Mets
- Kristine Leahy (2005), American television host and sports reporter
- Amy LePeilbet, 2012 Olympic Gold Medalist in Women's Soccer. Professional women's soccer player with the FC Kansas City and defender on the United States Women's National Soccer Team
- Nick Martini, Major League Baseball player with the Chicago Cubs
