= McCullom Lake, Illinois =

McCullom Lake
- Village
- Logo

- Location of McCullom Lake in McHenry County, Illinois.
- Coordinates: 42°22′17″N 88°17′51″W
- Country: United States
- State: Illinois
- County: McHenry
- Township: McHenry
- Incorporated: April 7, 1955

Area
  - Total: 0.36 sq mi (0.94 km^{2})
  - Land: 0.35 sq mi (0.90 km^{2})
  - Water: 0.019 sq mi (0.05 km^{2})
- Elevation: 824 ft (251 m)

Population (2020)
  - Total: 988
  - Density: 2,845.5/sq mi (1,098.66/km^{2})
- Time zone: UTC-6 (CST)
  - Summer (DST): UTC-5 (CDT)
- ZIP code: 60050
- Area codes: 815, 779
- FIPS code: 17-45616
- GNIS feature ID: 2399292
- Website: voml.org

McCullom Lake is a village in McHenry County, Illinois, United States. Per the 2020 census, the population was 988.

== Geography ==
According to the 2010 census, McCullom Lake has a total area of 0.37 square miles (0.96 km^{2}), all land. McHenry occupies the southeast shore. The Lake is well known locally for excellent ice fishing. Shallow weeds in the late summer time at the McCullom Lake beach, (not McHenry's beach) make its beach dangerous (drownings have occurred) and have limited game fishing.

=== Major streets ===
- McCullom Lake Road

== Demographics ==
=== 2020 census ===
Historical population
Census	Pop.	Note	%±
1960	759		—
1970	873		15.0%
1980	947		8.5%
1990	1,033		9.1%
2000	1,038		0.5%
2010	1,049		1.1%
2020	988		−5.8%
U.S. Decennial Census; 2010 2020

McCullom Lake village, Illinois – Racial and ethnic composition Note: the US Census treats Hispanic/Latino as an ethnic category. This table excludes Latinos from the racial categories and assigns them to a separate category. Hispanics/Latinos may be of any race.
Race / Ethnicity (NH = Non-Hispanic)	Pop 2000	Pop 2010	Pop 2020	% 2000	% 2010	% 2020
White alone (NH)	975	900	750	93.93%	85.80%	75.91%
Black or African American alone (NH)	9	6	7	0.87%	0.57%	0.71%
Native American or Alaska Native alone (NH)	3	6	0	0.29%	0.57%	0.00%
Asian alone (NH)	3	2	16	0.29%	0.19%	1.62%
Pacific Islander alone (NH)	1	0	0	0.10%	0.00%	0.00%
Other race alone (NH)	0	1	0	0.00%	0.10%	0.00%
Mixed race or Multiracial (NH)	3	4	49	0.29%	0.38%	4.96%
Hispanic or Latino (any race)	44	130	166	4.24%	12.39%	16.80%
Total	1,038	1,049	988	100.00%	100.00%	100.00%

=== 2000 Census ===
As of the census of 2000, there were 1,038 people, 382 households, and 273 families residing in the village. The population density was 3,708.2 inhabitants per square mile (1,431.7/km^{2}). There were 418 housing units at an average density of 1,493.3 per square mile (576.6/km^{2}). The racial makeup of the village was 96.44% White, 0.87% African American, 0.48% Native American, 0.29% Asian, 0.10% Pacific Islander, 1.25% from other races, and 0.58% from two or more races. Hispanic or Latino of any race were 4.24% of the population.

There were 382 households, out of which 38.0% had children under the age of 18 living with them, 56.3% were married couples living together, 9.4% had a female householder with no husband present, and 28.5% were non-families. 22.8% of all households were made up of individuals, and 5.2% had someone living alone who was 65 years of age or older. The average household size was 2.72 and the average family size was 3.22.

In the village, the population was spread out, with 28.0% under the age of 18, 9.0% from 18 to 24, 35.9% from 25 to 44, 19.7% from 45 to 64, and 7.4% who were 65 years of age or older. The median age was 33 years. For every 100 females, there were 100.0 males. For every 100 females age 18 and over, there were 104.1 males.

The median income for a household in the village was $54,500, and the median income for a family was $59,423. Males had a median income of $40,238 versus $26,100 for females. The per capita income for the village was $20,350. About 5.2% of families and 5.5% of the population were below the poverty line, including 8.1% of those under age 18 and 1.8% of those age 65 or over.

== Class action lawsuit ==
In April 2006, three former next-door neighbors who contracted brain cancer filed a class action lawsuit against several manufacturers in the neighboring town of Ringwood, claiming that groundwater and air contamination caused their illnesses. There were 33 plaintiffs in the class action case.

The lawsuit was dismissed in 2010, but reinstated in 2014 by an appeals court. The case was settled out of court in late 2014.
