= Prairie Grove =

Prairie Grove is the name of some places in the United States:

- Prairie Grove, Arkansas
- Prairie Grove, Illinois
