= Dorr Township =

Dorr Township may refer to the following places in the United States:

- Dorr Township, McHenry County, Illinois
- Dorr Township, Michigan
