= Johnsburg, Illinois =

- Village
- Village of Johnsburg
- Logo

- Location of Johnsburg in McHenry County, Illinois.
- Coordinates: 42°22′35″N 88°14′50″W
- Country: United States
- State: Illinois
- County: McHenry
- Township: McHenry
- Founded: 1841
- Incorporated: 1956

Area
  - Total: 7.85 sq mi (20.32 km^{2})
  - Land: 7.25 sq mi (18.78 km^{2})
  - Water: 0.59 sq mi (1.54 km^{2})
- Elevation: 810 ft (250 m)

Population (2020)
  - Total: 6,355
  - Density: 876.6/sq mi (338.47/km^{2})
- Time zone: UTC-6 (CST)
  - Summer (DST): UTC-5 (CDT)
- ZIP code: 60050, 60051
- Area code: 815
- FIPS code: 17-38479
- GNIS feature ID: 2398304
- Website: www.johnsburg.org

Johnsburg is a village in McHenry County, Illinois, with a population of 6,355 as of the 2020 U.S. census.

== History ==
The area that came to be known as Johnsburg was first settled in 1841, five years after the founding of McHenry County, by immigrant families escaping religious persecution and oppressive social conditions in the Eifel region of Germany, predominantly the Mayen-Koblenz." (The congregation is known today as St. John the Baptist.) They built their first church in 1842, a simple log cabin that also functioned as a school and meeting hall. The first priest to serve this new congregation was delivered there by friendly Native Americans who found him lost in the woods of Wisconsin. The church served the community until 1850, when a larger frame church was built to replace it. Construction on a third church, built in the Gothic style, began in 1867. This church took thirteen years to complete and was the pride of the Johnsburg community until it was destroyed by a fire on February 19, 1900. Many of the early settlers' grave markers were also destroyed by the fire. The present St. John the Baptist church was dedicated in 1902.

By 1990, a group of citizens living in this unincorporated area of McHenry County had come to fear that their community, known for over 100 years as Johnsburg, would be swallowed or divided by surrounding municipalities. They turned to their neighbors in Sunnyside, an adjacent village with which they shared a library, schools, and other services, for solutions. (Sunnyside had been incorporated in 1956.) Sunnyside and Johnsburg leaders struck an informal agreement that allowed Sunnyside to annex the surrounding area, thereby tripling its size, but required it to rename itself Johnsburg. After Sunnyside completed the annexation in 1992, the Sunnyside Village Board legally renamed its municipality to Johnsburg.

== Geography ==
According to the 2010 census, Johnsburg has a total area of 7.674 square miles (19.88 km^{2}), of which 7.08 square miles (18.34 km^{2}) (or 92.26%) is land and 0.594 square miles (1.54 km^{2}) (or 7.74%) is water. Johnsburg lies within the watershed of the Fox river.

=== Major streets ===
- Richmond Road

=== Public transportation ===
As of October 2018, a Pace bus route between the nearby municipalities of Crystal Lake, McHenry, and Fox Lake also serves Johnsburg. The closest rail transit is McHenry station, one of the termini of Metra's Union Pacific Northwest Line.

== Demographics ==
Historical population
Census	Pop.	Note	%±
2000	5,391		—
2010	6,337		17.5%
2020	6,355		0.3%
U.S. Decennial Census

=== Racial and ethnic composition ===
Johnsburg village, Illinois – Racial and ethnic composition Note: the US Census treats Hispanic/Latino as an ethnic category. This table excludes Latinos from the racial categories and assigns them to a separate category. Hispanics/Latinos may be of any race.
Race / Ethnicity (NH = Non-Hispanic)	Pop 2000	Pop 2010	Pop 2020	% 2000	% 2010	% 2020
White alone (NH)	5,264	6,007	5,684	97.64%	94.79%	89.44%
Black or African American alone (NH)	7	21	22	0.13%	0.33%	0.35%
Native American or Alaska Native alone (NH)	3	8	6	0.06%	0.13%	0.09%
Asian alone (NH)	9	41	54	0.17%	0.65%	0.85%
Pacific Islander alone (NH)	0	1	0	0.00%	0.02%	0.00%
Other race alone (NH)	1	3	10	0.02%	0.05%	0.16%
Mixed race or Multiracial (NH)	25	43	253	0.46%	0.68%	3.98%
Hispanic or Latino (any race)	82	213	326	1.52%	3.36%	5.13%
Total	5,391	6,337	6,355	100.00%	100.00%	100.00%

=== 2020 census ===
As of the 2020 census, Johnsburg had a population of 6,355. The median age was 45.5 years. 20.8% of residents were under the age of 18 and 17.8% of residents were 65 years of age or older. For every 100 females there were 101.2 males, and for every 100 females age 18 and over there were 101.2 males age 18 and over.

97.1% of residents lived in urban areas, while 2.9% lived in rural areas.

There were 2,322 households in Johnsburg, of which 30.9% had children under the age of 18 living in them. Of all households, 65.3% were married-couple households, 12.3% were households with a male householder and no spouse or partner present, and 15.8% were households with a female householder and no spouse or partner present. About 15.2% of all households were made up of individuals and 7.1% had someone living alone who was 65 years of age or older.

There were 2,484 housing units, of which 6.5% were vacant. The homeowner vacancy rate was 1.3% and the rental vacancy rate was 10.7%.

=== 2000 census ===
As of the 2000 census, there were 5,391 people, 1,760 households, and 1,501 families residing in the village. The population density was 973.7 inhabitants per square mile (375.9/km^{2}). There were 1,875 housing units at an average density of 338.6 per square mile (130.7/km^{2}). The racial makeup of the village was 98.83% White, 0.13% African American, 0.06% Native American, 0.19% Asian, 0.17% from other races, and 0.63% from two or more races. Hispanic or Latino of any race were 1.52% of the population.

There were 1,760 households, out of which 44.9% had children under the age of 18 living with them, 73.9% were married couples living together, 7.1% had a female householder with no husband present, and 14.7% were non-families. 11.8% of all households were made up of individuals, and 3.9% had someone living alone who was 65 years of age or older. The average household size was 3.06 and the average family size was 3.32.

In the village, the population was spread out, with 30.6% under the age of 18, 7.0% from 18 to 24, 28.3% from 25 to 44, 26.4% from 45 to 64, and 7.6% who were 65 years of age or older. The median age was 37 years. For every 100 females, there were 102.1 males. For every 100 females age 18 and over, there were 99.4 males.

The median income for a household in the village was $69,864, and the median income for a family was $73,491. Males had a median income of $51,832 versus $30,893 for females. The per capita income for the village was $27,582. About 1.1% of families and 1.3% of the population were below the poverty line, including 2.1% of those under age 18 and none of those age 65 or over.

== Schools ==
Four schools are part of District 12, which serves students in the Villages of Johnsburg and Ringwood and in the Pistakee Highlands. Johnsburg High School serves grades 9 - 12; known as the "Skyhawks." Johnburg Junior High School, the "Wildcats," serves 6 - 8. Up until 2016, James C. Bush Elementary School served grades 3 and 4 (grade 5 was located at JJHS). Johnsburg Elementary School, the "Bloodhounds", now serves grades 3 - 5. Johnsburg Ringwood Primary Center also known as "The Ringwood Rockets" serves children from PreK - grade 2. The start of the 2008–09 school year brought the steepest enrollment in District 12 schools in five years, when 93 fewer students enrolled.

== Cultural references ==
Tom Waits wrote a song called "Johnsburg, Illinois" in 1982. He included it on his album of the following year Swordfishtrombones. It is a short, poignant love poem to his wife, Kathleen Brennan, who grew up in the village. The song was covered by John C. Reilly on his 2025 album "What's Not To Love?"

== Notable people ==
- Kathleen Brennan, musician, songwriter, record producer, and artist. Wife of musician Tom Waits
- C. J. Fiedorowicz, retired tight end for the Houston Texans of the NFL
- Clay Guida ("The Carpenter,"), mixed martial artist , lived in Johnsburg
- Chuck Hiller, second baseman, coach, and manager with several teams
- John Jakus, coach, Florida Atlantic University
- Sam Saboura, current host of TLC's Something Borrowed, Something New
