= Ringwood, Illinois =

- Village
- Village of Ringwood
- Seal
- Etymology: A ring of woods
- Location in McHenry County, Illinois
- Coordinates: 42°23′50″N 88°18′15″W
- Country: United States
- State: Illinois
- County: McHenry
- Townships: McHenry
- Founded: 1994

Area
  - Total: 3.86 sq mi (10.01 km^{2})
  - Land: 3.86 sq mi (10.01 km^{2})
  - Water: 0 sq mi (0.00 km^{2})
- Elevation: 879 ft (268 m)

Population (2020)
  - Total: 844
  - Density: 218.4/sq mi (84.34/km^{2})
- Time zone: UTC-6 (CST)
  - Summer (DST): UTC-5 (CDT)
- ZIP code: 60072
- Area code: 815
- FIPS code: 17-64135
- GNIS feature ID: 2399076
- Website: ringwood-il.us

Ringwood is a northwest suburban village in McHenry County, Illinois, United States. It is a commuter village, another city part of the Chicago metropolitan area. The population was 844 at the 2020 census.

== History ==
=== Settlement ===
Ringwood was settled in 1837 by Dr. Luke Hale and Wm. H. Beach, both native to Vermont. The original settlement was supposedly surrounded by a ring of trees, hence the name "Ringwood".

=== Development ===
The Ringwood post office was established in 1845 to provide post office boxes for local industrial firms and residents located on the far northern edge of McHenry. The small village was platted in 1854, allowing the installation of roads, infrastructure, public amenities and allowing residents to legally own plots of land for agricultural use, and the construction of homes and businesses. In an attempt to maintain its small-town environment, Ringwood was incorporated as a Village on November 15, 1994. By 2018, the Village of Ringwood had two paid staff, plus contracted services including building inspection, and an unsalaried Board of Trustees.

== Geography ==
Ringwood is located in northeastern McHenry County and is bordered by the larger village of Johnsburg to the southeast. The village of Wonder Lake is to the southwest.

According to the U.S. Census Bureau, Ringwood has a total area of 3.86 square miles (10.00 km^{2}), all land.

=== Major streets ===
- Richmond Road passes just northeast of the center of Ringwood, leading north 6 miles (10 km) to Richmond and southeast 4 miles (6 km) to McHenry.
- Barnard Mill Road runs northwest–southeast through the center of Ringwood.
- Ringwood Road, running southwest–northeast, crosses Barnard Mill Road in the village center.

=== Public and rail transportation ===
As of October 2018, the closest public transportation to Ringwood is a Pace bus route that runs through Johnsburg, between the nearby municipalities of Crystal Lake, McHenry, and Fox Lake. The closest rail transit is the McHenry commuter rail station, one of the termini of Metra's Union Pacific Northwest Line. Until 1980, the commuter rail service also served a Ringwood station and continued north to the Village of Richmond, Illinois. A remaining freight track exists between Ringwood's Dow Chemical plant at Barnard Mill Road and McHenry station.

== Demographics ==
Historical population
Census	Pop.	Note	%±
2000	471		—
2010	836		77.5%
2020	844		1.0%
U.S. Decennial Census

Ringwood village, Illinois – Racial and ethnic composition Note: the US Census treats Hispanic/Latino as an ethnic category. This table excludes Latinos from the racial categories and assigns them to a separate category. Hispanics/Latinos may be of any race.
Race / Ethnicity (NH = Non-Hispanic)	Pop 2000	Pop 2010	Pop 2020	% 2000	% 2010	% 2020
White alone (NH)	464	789	741	98.51%	94.38%	87.80%
Black or African American alone (NH)	1	7	12	0.21%	0.84%	1.42%
Native American or Alaska Native alone (NH)	0	0	0	0.00%	0.00%	0.00%
Asian alone (NH)	3	2	6	0.64%	0.24%	0.71%
Pacific Islander alone (NH)	0	0	0	0.00%	0.00%	0.00%
Other race alone (NH)	0	1	0	0.00%	0.12%	0.00%
Mixed race or Multiracial (NH)	1	12	39	0.21%	1.44%	4.62%
Hispanic or Latino (any race)	2	25	46	0.42%	2.99%	5.45%
Total	471	836	844	100.00%	100.00%	100.00%

=== 2010 census ===
As of the census of 2010, there were 836 people. The population density was 216.6 inhabitants per square mile (83.6/km^{2}). There were 297 housing units at an average density of 76.9 per square mile (29.7/km^{2}). The racial makeup of the village was 96.2% White, 0.8% African American, 0.2% Asian, 0.6% from other races, and 2.2% from two or more races. Hispanic or Latino of any race were 3% of the population.

In the village, the population was spread out, with 26.9% (225) under the age of 18, 73.0% (611) over the age of 18, 3.2% (27) from 20 to 24, 5.5% (46) from 25 to 34, 27.6% (231) from 35 to 49, 23.3% (195) from 50 to 64, and 10.2% (85) were aged 65 or more. The median age was 42.4 years of age. 50.1% (419) were male, and 49.9 (417) were female.

There were 285 households, out of which 36.1% had children under the age of 18 living with them, 73.3% were married couples living together, 6.3% had a female householder with no husband present, 3.2% had a male householder with no wife present, and 17.2% were non-families. 13.7% of all households were made up of individuals, and 3.5% had someone living alone who was 65 years of age or older. The average household size was 2.93 and the average family size was 3.22. The median income for a household in the village was $90,250, and the median income for a family was $91,389. Males had a median income of $91,250 versus $37,500 for females. The per capita income for the village was $35,151. About 9.4% of families and 8.8% of the population were below the poverty line, including 15.0% of those under age 18 and 6.7% of those age 65 or over.
