= Riley, Illinois =

- Census-designated place
- Location within Illinois Location within the United States
- Coordinates: 42°11′38″N 88°37′33″W
- Country: United States
- State: Illinois
- County: McHenry
- Township: Riley

Area
  - Total: 0.18 sq mi (0.46 km^{2})
  - Land: 0.18 sq mi (0.46 km^{2})
  - Water: 0 sq mi (0.00 km^{2})
- Elevation: 817 ft (249 m)

Population (2020)
  - Total: 10
  - Density: 56/sq mi (21.8/km^{2})
- Time zone: UTC-6 (Central (CST))
  - Summer (DST): UTC-5 (CDT)
- Zip: 60152
- Area codes: 815 & 779
- GNIS feature ID: 2806553

Riley is an unincorporated community and census-designated place in McHenry County, Illinois, United States. It was named a CDP before the 2020 census, at which time it had a population of 10.

== Geography ==
The community is located on the north side of the junction of Anthony Road, which runs east–west and Riley Road, which runs north–south. Both of these are Riley Township highways. In terms of the Public Land Survey System, Riley is found in the Northeast Quarter of Section 22, Township 43 North, Range 5 East of the Third Principal Meridian.

The main branch of Coon Creek flows to the west of the community in a generally southeast to northwest direction, and a minor branch of the same creek flows from east to west to the north of the community. Riley is served by the Marengo, Illinois 60152 post office.

== Demographics ==
Historical population
Census	Pop.	Note	%±
2020	10		—
U.S. Decennial Census; 2020

Riley first appeared as a census designated place in the 2020 U.S. census.

=== 2020 census ===
Riley CDP, Illinois – Racial and ethnic composition Note: the US Census treats Hispanic/Latino as an ethnic category. This table excludes Latinos from the racial categories and assigns them to a separate category. Hispanics/Latinos may be of any race.
Race / Ethnicity (NH = Non-Hispanic)	Pop 2020	% 2020
White alone (NH)	8	80.00%
Black or African American alone (NH)	0	0.00%
Native American or Alaska Native alone (NH)	0	0.00%
Asian alone (NH)	0	0.00%
Native Hawaiian or Pacific Islander alone (NH)	0	0.00%
Other race alone (NH)	0	0.00%
Mixed race or Multiracial (NH)	1	10.00%
Hispanic or Latino (any race)	1	10.00%
Total	10	100.00%

== Points of interest ==
Riley Community Consolidated (K-8) School, District #18, 9406 Riley Road; the Riley Center Memorial Cemetery; old Riley Township Hall; and the Riley Township War Memorial.

== See also ==
- Riley Township
