= Riley Township, Illinois =

Coordinates: 42°11′31″N 88°38′50″W

Riley Township
- Township
- Location in McHenry County
- Country: United States
- State: Illinois
- County: McHenry
- Established: November 6, 1849

Area
  - Total: 36.04 sq mi (93.3 km^{2})
  - Land: 35.97 sq mi (93.2 km^{2})
  - Water: 0.08 sq mi (0.21 km^{2}) 0.22%

Population (2020)
  - Total: 3,035
  - Density: 81.2/sq mi (31.4/km^{2})
- Time zone: UTC-6 (CST)
  - Summer (DST): UTC-5 (CDT)
- FIPS code: 17-111-64096
- Website: https://www.rileytwp.com/

Riley Township is located in McHenry County, Illinois. As of the 2020 census, its population was 3,035 and it contained 1,070 housing units. It contains the census-designated place of Riley.

== Geography ==
According to the 2010 census, the township has a total area of 36.04 square miles (93.3 km^{2}), of which 35.97 square miles (93.2 km^{2}) (or 99.81%) is land and 0.08 square miles (0.21 km^{2}) (or 0.22%) is water.

== Demographics ==
Historical population
| Census | Pop. | Note | %± |
|---|---|---|---|
| 2010 | 2,922 | | — |
| 2020 | 3,035 | | 3.9% |
U.S. Decennial Census
