= Alden, Illinois =

- Census-designated place
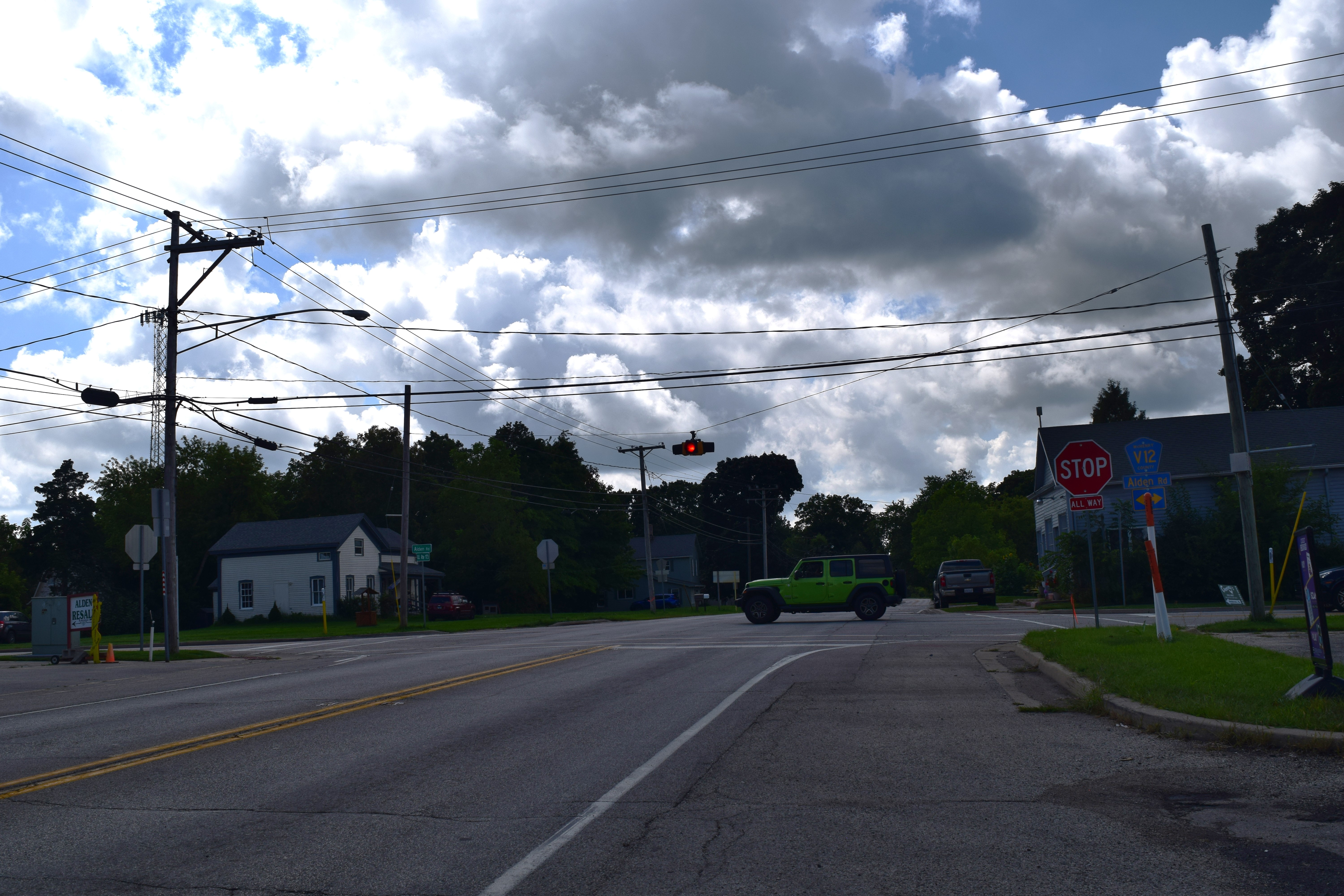
- Looking west on Illinois Route 173 in Alden

- Location within Illinois Location within the United States
- Coordinates: 42°27′31″N 88°31′07″W
- Country: United States
- State: Illinois
- County: McHenry
- Township: Alden

Area
  - Total: 0.13 sq mi (0.33 km^{2})
  - Land: 0.13 sq mi (0.33 km^{2})
  - Water: 0 sq mi (0.00 km^{2})
- Elevation: 1,007 ft (307 m)

Population (2020)
  - Total: 113
  - Density: 899.5/sq mi (347.31/km^{2})
- Time zone: UTC-6 (Central (CST))
  - Summer (DST): UTC-5 (CDT)
- ZIP Code: 60001
- Area codes: 815 & 779
- FIPS code: 17-00594
- GNIS feature ID: 2806446

Alden (/ˈɑːldɪn/ AWL-dihn), elevation 1,004 feet (306 m), is an unincorporated community and census-designated place in McHenry County, Illinois, United States. It was named a CDP for the 2020 census, at which time it had a population of 113.

== History ==
Alden was laid out in 1844, and named after Alden, New York, the native home of a large share of the first settlers. A post office called Alden had been in operation since 1844. However, as of year 2023 a post office no longer is present in Alden.

== Geography ==
The community is situated in the heart of Alden Township at the junction of Alden Road (County Highway V-12) and Illinois Route 173. The headwaters of Nippersink Creek originate at the High Point Unit of the McHenry County Conservation District, flowing to the southeast and east. In terms of the Public Land Survey System, Alden is located within the Southeast Quarter of Section 15 and the Northeast Quarter of Section 23, Township 46 North, Range 6 East of the Third Principal Meridian. Alden is served by the Harvard, Illinois 60033 post office.

== Demographics ==
Historical population
| Census | Pop. | Note | %± |
|---|---|---|---|
| 2020 | 113 | | — |
U.S. Decennial Census; 2020

Alden first appeared as a census designated place in the 2020 U.S. census.

=== 2020 census ===
Alden CDP, Illinois – Racial and ethnic composition Note: the US Census treats Hispanic/Latino as an ethnic category. This table excludes Latinos from the racial categories and assigns them to a separate category. Hispanics/Latinos may be of any race.
| Race / Ethnicity (NH = Non-Hispanic) | Pop 2020 | % 2020 |
|---|---|---|
| White alone (NH) | 102 | 90.27% |
| Black or African American alone (NH) | 0 | 0.00% |
| Native American or Alaska Native alone (NH) | 0 | 0.00% |
| Asian alone (NH) | 0 | 0.00% |
| Native Hawaiian or Pacific Islander alone (NH) | 0 | 0.00% |
| Other race alone (NH) | 1 | 0.88% |
| Mixed race or Multiracial (NH) | 5 | 4.42% |
| Hispanic or Latino (any race) | 5 | 4.42% |
| Total | 113 | 100.00% |

== Points of interest ==
A small commercial district is located at the highway junction. The Alden Township facility is just south of the community at 8515 Alden Road.

== See also ==
- Alden Township, McHenry County, Illinois
