= Franklinville, Illinois =

- Census-designated place
- Location within Illinois Location within the United States
- Coordinates: 42°16′32″N 88°30′56″W
- Country: United States
- State: Illinois
- County: McHenry
- Township: Seneca

Area
  - Total: 0.17 sq mi (0.43 km^{2})
  - Land: 0.17 sq mi (0.43 km^{2})
  - Water: 0 sq mi (0.00 km^{2})
- Elevation: 833 ft (254 m)

Population (2020)
  - Total: 38
  - Density: 228.5/sq mi (88.22/km^{2})
- Time zone: UTC-6 (Central (CST))
  - Summer (DST): UTC-5 (CDT)
- Area codes: 815 & 779
- FIPS code: 17-27728
- GNIS feature ID: 2806490

Franklinville is an unincorporated community and census-designated place in McHenry County, Illinois, United States. It was named a CDP before the 2020 census, at which time it had a population of 38.

== Geography ==
The community is situated in the heart of Seneca Township at the junction of Franklinville Road (County Highway T-68) and Garden Valley-Perkins Road. A minor middle branch of the Kishwaukee River — called Franklinville Creek by some — crosses the community in a northeast-to-southwest direction. In terms of the Public Land Survey System, Franklinville is divided between Sections 22 and 23, Township 44 North, Range 6 East of the Third Principal Meridian.

== Demographics ==
Historical population
Census	Pop.	Note	%±
2020	38		—
U.S. Decennial Census; 2020

Franklinville first appeared as a census designated place in the 2020 U.S. census.

=== 2020 census ===
Franklinville CDP, Illinois – Racial and ethnic composition Note: the US Census treats Hispanic/Latino as an ethnic category. This table excludes Latinos from the racial categories and assigns them to a separate category. Hispanics/Latinos may be of any race.
Race / Ethnicity (NH = Non-Hispanic)	Pop 2020	% 2020
White alone (NH)	33	86.84%
Black or African American alone (NH)	0	0.00%
Native American or Alaska Native alone (NH)	0	0.00%
Asian alone (NH)	0	0.00%
Native Hawaiian or Pacific Islander alone (NH)	0	0.00%
Other race alone (NH)	0	0.00%
Mixed race or Multiracial (NH)	4	10.53%
Hispanic or Latino (any race)	1	2.63%
Total	38	100.00%

== Points of interest ==
Franklinville is the site of the old Seneca Township Hall (built circa 1885) and the Franklinville cemetery. The modern office of Seneca Township is located approximately three-quarters of a mile west of the crossroads at 16506 Garden Valley Road (post office: Woodstock, IL 60098).

== See also ==
- Seneca Township
