= Pistakee Highlands, Illinois =

Pistakee Highlands
- Census-designated place
- Location of Pistakee Highlands within Illinois
- Coordinates: 42°24′08″N 88°12′41″W
- Country: United States
- State: Illinois
- County: McHenry

Area
  - Total: 1.8 sq mi (4.7 km^{2})
  - Land: 1.4 sq mi (3.6 km^{2})
  - Water: 0.3 sq mi (0.78 km^{2})
- Elevation: 742 ft (226 m)

Population (2020)
  - Total: 3,237
  - Density: 2,300/sq mi (890/km^{2})
- Time zone: UTC-6 (CST)
  - Summer (DST): UTC-5 (CDT)
- GNIS feature ID: 2393188

Pistakee Highlands is a census-designated place (CDP) in McHenry County, Illinois, United States. It consists primarily of an unincorporated area of McHenry County adjoining Pistakee Bay, within the McHenry post office, and is located just northeast of Johnsburg. Per the 2020 census, the population was 3,237.

== Geography ==
According to the United States Census Bureau, the CDP has a total area of 1.8 square miles (4.7 km^{2}), of which, 1.4 square miles (3.6 km^{2}) is land and 0.3 square miles (0.78 km^{2}) (18.64%) is water.

== Demographics ==
Historical population
Census	Pop.	Note	%±
2000	3,812		—
2010	3,454		−9.4%
2020	3,237		−6.3%
U.S. Decennial Census; 2010 2020

=== Racial and ethnic composition ===
Pistakee Highlands CDP, Illinois – Racial and ethnic composition Note: the US Census treats Hispanic/Latino as an ethnic category. This table excludes Latinos from the racial categories and assigns them to a separate category. Hispanics/Latinos may be of any race.
Race / Ethnicity (NH = Non-Hispanic)	Pop 2000	Pop 2010	Pop 2020	% 2000	% 2010	% 2020
White alone (NH)	3,632	3,247	2,805	95.28%	94.01%	86.65%
Black or African American alone (NH)	5	13	22	0.13%	0.38%	0.68%
Native American or Alaska Native alone (NH)	8	4	6	0.21%	0.12%	0.19%
Asian alone (NH)	5	8	18	0.13%	0.23%	0.56%
Native Hawaiian or Pacific Islander alone (NH)	0	0	0	0.00%	0.00%	0.00%
Other race alone (NH)	8	2	6	0.21%	0.06%	0.19%
Mixed race or Multiracial (NH)	28	22	123	0.73%	0.64%	3.80%
Hispanic or Latino (any race)	126	158	257	3.31%	4.57%	7.94%
Total	3,812	3,454	3,237	100.00%	100.00%	100.00%

=== 2020 census ===
As of the 2020 census, Pistakee Highlands had a population of 3,237. The median age was 41.8 years. 20.8% of residents were under the age of 18 and 16.8% were 65 years of age or older. For every 100 females, there were 103.3 males, and for every 100 females age 18 and over, there were 101.9 males age 18 and over.

100.0% of residents lived in urban areas, while 0.0% lived in rural areas.

There were 1,312 households, of which 27.1% had children under the age of 18 living in them. Of all households, 50.2% were married-couple households, 19.8% were households with a male householder and no spouse or partner present, and 22.3% were households with a female householder and no spouse or partner present. About 25.4% of all households were made up of individuals, and 9.9% had someone living alone who was 65 years of age or older.

There were 1,407 housing units, of which 6.8% were vacant. The homeowner vacancy rate was 1.9% and the rental vacancy rate was 9.1%.

=== 2000 census ===
As of the census of 2000, there were 3,812 people, 1,342 households, and 1,041 families residing in the CDP. The population density was 2,653.0 inhabitants per square mile (1,024.3/km^{2}). There were 1,400 housing units at an average density of 974.4 per square mile (376.2/km^{2}). The racial makeup of the CDP was 97.98% White, 0.13% African American, 0.26% Native American, 0.13% Asian, 0.68% from other races, and 0.81% from two or more races. Hispanic or Latino of any race were 3.31% of the population.

There were 1,342 households, out of which 39.9% had children under the age of 18 living with them, 63.3% were married couples living together, 9.7% had a female householder with no husband present, and 22.4% were non-families. 18.1% of all households were made up of individuals, and 5.4% had someone living alone who was 65 years of age or older. The average household size was 2.84 and the average family size was 3.23.

In the CDP, the population was spread out, with 28.9% under the age of 18, 7.1% from 18 to 24, 32.5% from 25 to 44, 23.4% from 45 to 64, and 8.1% who were 65 years of age or older. The median age was 35 years. For every 100 females, there were 103.6 males. For every 100 females age 18 and over, there were 98.8 males.

The median income for a household in the CDP was $54,943, and the median income for a family was $62,868. Males had a median income of $42,750 versus $30,504 for females. The per capita income for the CDP was $21,852. About 3.5% of families and 4.4% of the population were below the poverty line, including 4.1% of those under age 18 and 6.3% of those age 65 or over.
