= Holiday Hills, Illinois =

- Village
- Logo

- Location of Holiday Hills in McHenry County, Illinois.
- Coordinates: 42°17′52″N 88°13′45″W
- Country: United States
- State: Illinois
- County: McHenry
- Township: Nunda
- Incorporated: March 10, 1976

Area
  - Total: 0.97 sq mi (2.52 km^{2})
  - Land: 0.93 sq mi (2.42 km^{2})
  - Water: 0.039 sq mi (0.10 km^{2})
- Elevation: 738 ft (225 m)

Population (2020)
  - Total: 618
  - Density: 661/sq mi (255.4/km^{2})
- Time zone: UTC-6 (CST)
  - Summer (DST): UTC-5 (CDT)
- ZIP code: 60051
- Area code: 815
- FIPS code: 17-35515
- GNIS feature ID: 2398523
- Website: www.villageofholidayhills.com

Holiday Hills is a village in McHenry County, Illinois, United States. Per the 2020 census, the population was 618.

== Geography ==
According to the 2010 census, Holiday Hills has a total area of 0.99 square miles (2.56 km^{2}), of which 0.95 square miles (2.46 km^{2}) (or 95.96%) is land and 0.04 square miles (0.10 km^{2}) (or 4.04%) is water.

== Demographics ==
Historical population
Census	Pop.	Note	%±
1980	802		—
1990	807		0.6%
2000	831		3.0%
2010	610		−26.6%
2020	618		1.3%
U.S. Decennial Census; 2010 2020

Holiday Hills village, Illinois – Racial and ethnic composition Note: the US Census treats Hispanic/Latino as an ethnic category. This table excludes Latinos from the racial categories and assigns them to a separate category. Hispanics/Latinos may be of any race.
Race / Ethnicity (NH = Non-Hispanic)	Pop 2000	Pop 2010	Pop 2020	% 2000	% 2010	% 2020
White alone (NH)	770	567	509	92.66%	92.95%	82.36%
Black or African American alone (NH)	10	1	1	1.20%	0.16%	0.16%
Native American or Alaska Native alone (NH)	3	3	0	0.36%	0.49%	0.00%
Asian alone (NH)	3	0	1	0.36%	0.00%	0.16%
Pacific Islander alone (NH)	1	0	0	0.12%	0.00%	0.00%
Other race alone (NH)	0	0	1	0.00%	0.00%	0.16%
Mixed race or Multiracial (NH)	1	4	28	0.12%	0.66%	4.53%
Hispanic or Latino (any race)	43	35	78	5.17%	5.74%	12.62%
Total	831	610	618	100.00%	100.00%	100.00%

=== 2000 Census ===
As of the census of 2000, there were 831 people, 280 households, and 225 families residing in the village. The population density was 877.7 inhabitants per square mile (338.9/km^{2}). There were 289 housing units at an average density of 305.2 per square mile (117.8/km^{2}). The racial makeup of the village was 94.46% White, 1.20% African American, 0.36% Native American, 0.36% Asian, 0.12% Pacific Islander, 3.01% from other races, and 0.48% from two or more races. Hispanic or Latino of any race were 5.17% of the population.

There were 280 households, out of which 41.4% had children under the age of 18 living with them, 65.7% were married couples living together, 10.0% had a female householder with no husband present, and 19.3% were non-families. 13.6% of all households were made up of individuals, and 2.1% had someone living alone who was 65 years of age or older. The average household size was 2.97 and the average family size was 3.22.

In the village, the population was spread out, with 27.4% under the age of 18, 9.4% from 18 to 24, 33.2% from 25 to 44, 24.5% from 45 to 64, and 5.4% who were 65 years of age or older. The median age was 34 years. For every 100 females, there were 102.7 males. For every 100 females age 18 and over, there were 101.0 males.

The median income for a household in the village was $57,857, and the median income for a family was $61,000. Males had a median income of $40,662 versus $30,481 for females. The per capita income for the village was $20,883. None of the population or families were below the poverty line.
