= Charles H. Hibbard House =

Historic house in Illinois, United States

- U.S. National Register of Historic Places
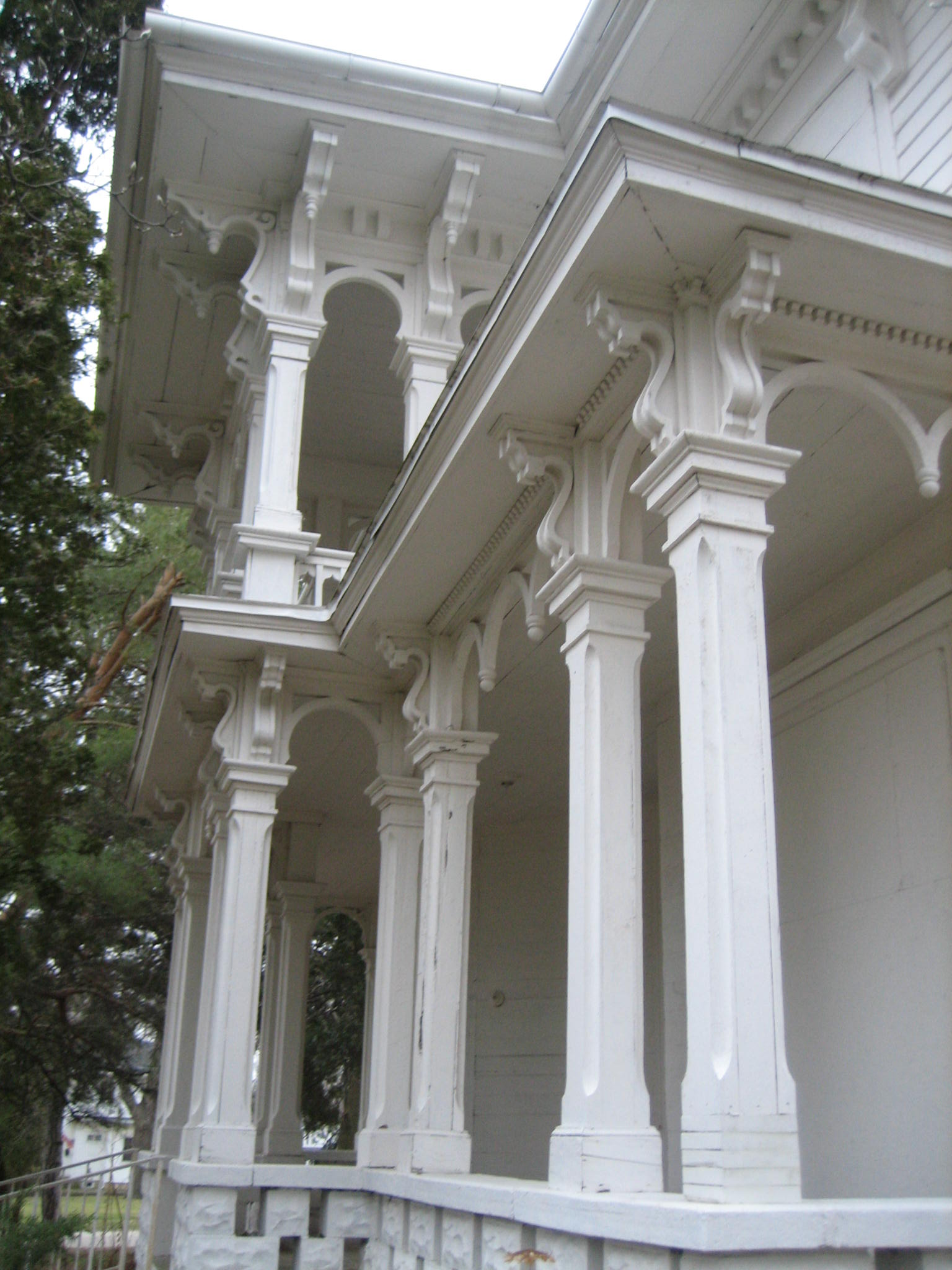
- The Charles H. Hibbard "Cupola" House in Marengo, Illinois.

- Location within Illinois Location within the United States
- Location: 413 W. Grant Hwy., Marengo, Illinois
- Coordinates: 42°14′53.89″N 88°36′45.46″W
- Area: less than one acre
- Built: 1846.
- Architectural style: Italianate
- NRHP reference No.: 79003113
- Added to NRHP: February 14, 1979

The Charles H. Hibbard House, in the McHenry County city of Marengo, Illinois, has been listed on the National Register of Historic Places since 1979. The home, also known as the Cupola House, stood unoccupied on Grant Highway as of January 2007. In recent years the home had been classified by the Landmarks Preservation Council of Illinois (LPCI) as one of the state's threatened landmarks. In 2003 the property was listed on LPCI's "top ten most endangered" list. Some time after its 2003 the home underwent some renovation and no longer appears dilapidated on its exterior, as it did in a 2003 photo featured by the LPCI. In 2003 the house was listed as a landmark by the city of Marengo.

== Architecture ==
The home is a distinctive example of Italianate architecture. The home's namesake as Cupola House comes from the octagonal cupola on its roof which provides ventilation and it is thought served as a lookout tower during the Civil War. the first floor has two back bedrooms believed to have been servant's quarters at one time. Upstairs, on the second floor, there are six bedrooms, a long hallway, a back staircase and bathroom.

== History ==
The Hibbard House has a fairly illustrious history, as houses go. Construction began in 1846 at the behest of Charles Hibbard, in 1847 the home was complete and the Hibbard's moved in. The home was constructed as an exact replica of Hibbard's childhood home and contains 14 rooms. Construction cost somewhere around $16,000. The property that the home is on was purchased as a 7-acre (28,000 m^{2}) plot from Christopher Sponable. Hibbard came to Marengo by way of Charleston, South Carolina. He was one of Marengo's first storekeepers and was a known horticulturalist who was renowned for his produce. During the Civil War it is thought that the home was used as a safe stop for runaway slaves. The cupola played a key role in that if it was safe to stop, for food and lodging, a light would be hung in the cupola window. The home also contained a secret, underground room in the yard, it had a hidden entrance near the front porch.

Hibbard died in Lawson, Missouri in 1872 and by 1874 the home was owned by Joseph Dietz who ran a machine shop in Marengo around 1877. Dietz married Caroline Sponable, the first white child to be born in Seneca Township. Dietz owned the home until 1894 when records show that A.H. (C.H or H.L.) Hale bought the home and held it until 1950. A local teacher, Jane Stanford, purchased the home in 1950 and owned it until 1955. Stanford was well known as an educator and community leader. Mr. and Mrs. Francis (Mary) Muzzy owned the home from 1956 to 1980. Jane Stanford's niece, Mary Stanford Muzzy (daughter of Charles Stanford, Jane's brother) and her husband purchased the home from her aunt's estate. Mary S. Muzzy Neal has owned the home since 1980. Mary Susan Neal lives in California and created a life there since before 1972 when she was admitted the state bar of California as an attorney.
