= Kevin Kaczmarski =

American baseball player (born 1991)

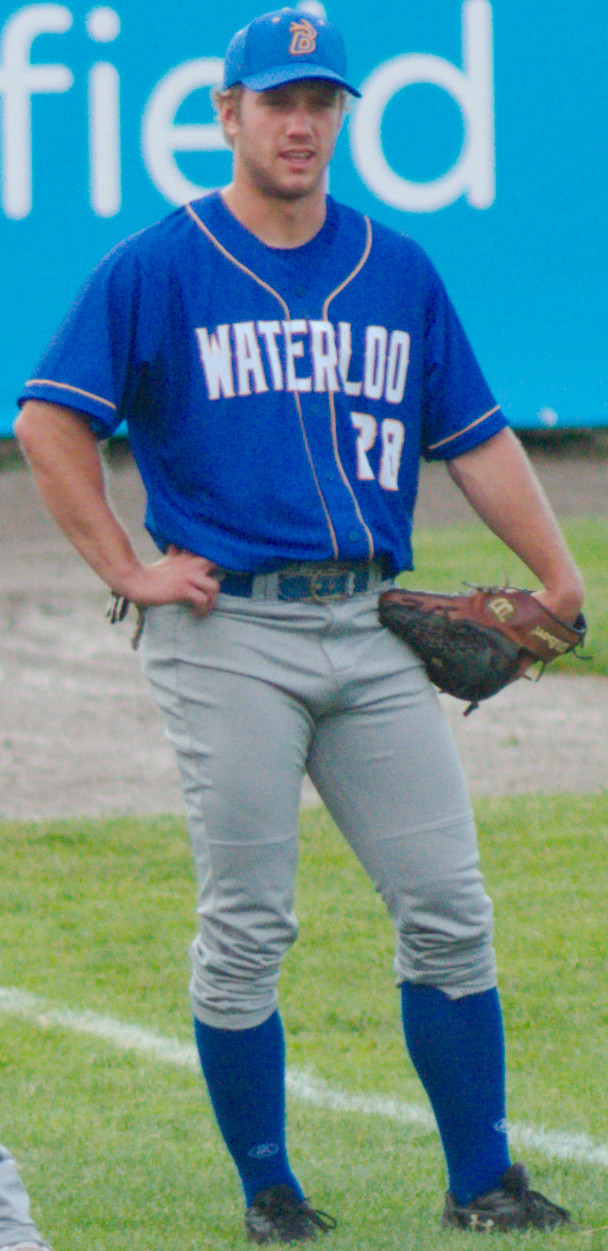
- Kaczmarski with the Waterloo Bucks in 2014
- Outfielder
- Born: December 31, 1991 (age 34); Cary, Illinois, U.S.
- Batted: Left Threw: Right

MLB debut
- June 24, 2018, for the New York Mets

Last MLB appearance
- July 9, 2018, for the New York Mets

MLB statistics
- Batting average: .000
- Home runs: 0
- Runs batted in: 0
- Stats at Baseball Reference

Teams
- New York Mets (2018)

Kevin Kaczmarski (born December 31, 1991) is an American former professional baseball outfielder. He played in Major League Baseball (MLB) for the Mets in 2018.

== Career ==
Kaczmarski graduated from Prairie Ridge High School in Crystal Lake, Illinois in 2010. After graduating, he enrolled at the University of Evansville where he played college baseball for the Evansville Purple Aces. In 2014, as a junior at Evansville, he batted .315 with four home runs and 50 RBIs in 55 games. He was not selected in the 2014 MLB draft. As a senior in 2015, he played in 46 games and hit five home runs with 57 RBIs and led the nation with a .465 batting average.

=== New York Mets ===
After his senior year, he was drafted by the New York Mets in the ninth round of the 2015 MLB draft and he signed for $5,000.

After signing, Kaczmarski made his professional debut that same year with the Kingsport Mets and spent the remainder of the season there, batting .355 with four home runs and 34 RBIs in 64 games. In 2016, he played for both the Columbia Fireflies and St. Lucie Mets, slashing a combined .280/.360/.413 with two home runs and 46 RBIs in 111 total games between both teams, and in 2017, he played for the Binghamton Mets where he hit .274 with five home runs, 52 RBIs, and 15 stolen bases in 128 games. After the 2017 season, he played in the Arizona Fall League. He began 2018 with the Las Vegas 51s.

Kaczmarski was called up by the Mets on June 23, 2018. In 24 games for Las Vegas prior to his promotion, he batted .363/.413/.450. Kaczmarski made his Major League debut at Citi Field on June 24 against the Los Angeles Dodgers, grounding out as a pinch hitter. He was designated for assignment on August 2, 2018.

He was assigned to Double-A Binghamton to start the 2019 season. He retired on September 20, 2019.
