= Alden Township, Illinois =

Alden Township
- Township
- Location in McHenry County

- McHenry County's location in Illinois
- Country: United States
- State: Illinois
- County: McHenry
- Established: November 6, 1849

Area
  - Total: 33.46 sq mi (86.7 km^{2})
  - Land: 33.41 sq mi (86.5 km^{2})
  - Water: 0.05 sq mi (0.13 km^{2}) 0.15%

Population (2020)
  - Total: 1,275
  - Density: 42/sq mi (16/km^{2})
- Time zone: UTC-6 (CST)
  - Summer (DST): UTC-5 (CDT)
- FIPS code: 17-111-00607
- Website: http://alden-township.org/

Alden Township is located in McHenry County, Illinois. As of the 2020 census, its population was 1,275 and it contained 620 housing units. It contains the census-designated place of Alden.

== Geography ==
According to the 2010 census, the township has a total area of 33.46 square miles (86.7 km^{2}), of which 33.41 square miles (86.5 km^{2}) (or 99.85%) is land and 0.05 square miles (0.13 km^{2}) (or 0.15%) is water.

== Demographics ==
Historical population
Census	Pop.	Note	%±
2010	1,402		—
2020	1,275		−9.1%
U.S. Decennial Census
