= Seneca Township, Illinois =

Coordinates: 42°16′43″N 88°31′38″W

Seneca Township
- Township
- Flag

- Location in McHenry County
- Country: United States
- State: Illinois
- County: McHenry
- Established: November 6, 1849

Area
  - Total: 35.96 sq mi (93.1 km^{2})
  - Land: 35.95 sq mi (93.1 km^{2})
  - Water: 0.01 sq mi (0.026 km^{2}) 0.03%

Population (2020)
  - Total: 2,893
  - Density: 81.9/sq mi (31.6/km^{2})
- Time zone: UTC-6 (CST)
  - Summer (DST): UTC-5 (CDT)
- FIPS code: 17-111-68653
- Website: http://www.senecatownship.com/

Seneca Township is located in McHenry County, Illinois. As of the 2020 census, its population was 2,893 and it contained 1,102 housing units. It includes the census-designated place of Franklinville.

== Geography ==
According to the 2010 census, the township has a total area of 35.96 square miles (93.1 km^{2}), of which 35.95 square miles (93.1 km^{2}) (or 99.97%) is land and 0.01 square miles (0.026 km^{2}) (or 0.03%) is water.

== Demographics ==
Historical population
Census	Pop.	Note	%±
2010	2,944		—
2020	2,893		−1.7%
U.S. Decennial Census
