= Prairie Grove, Illinois =

- Village
- Village of Prairie Grove
- Logo

- Location of Prairie Grove in McHenry County, Illinois.
- Coordinates: 42°16′10″N 88°16′06″W
- Country: United States
- State: Illinois
- County: McHenry
- Township: Nunda
- Incorporated: 1973

Area
  - Total: 5.68 sq mi (14.71 km^{2})
  - Land: 5.68 sq mi (14.70 km^{2})
  - Water: 0.0039 sq mi (0.01 km^{2})
- Elevation: 751 ft (229 m)

Population (2020)
  - Total: 1,963
  - Density: 345.8/sq mi (133.51/km^{2})
- Time zone: UTC-6 (CST)
  - Summer (DST): UTC-5 (CDT)
- ZIP codes: 60012, 60014
- Area codes: 815, 779
- FIPS code: 17-61678
- GNIS feature ID: 2399020
- Website: prairiegrove.org

Prairie Grove is a village in McHenry County, Illinois, United States, first incorporated in 1973. Per the 2020 census, the population was 1,963.

== History ==
Though Prairie Grove had been inhabited by settlers since the early 19th century in an area known as Barreville, the Village of Prairie Grove was incorporated in 1973. Since 2004, Prairie Grove has been a home rule community.

== Education ==
Prairie Grove is served by Prairie Grove School District 46 and Crystal Lake Community Consolidated School District 47, both of which are for students through 8th grade, and Community High School District 155, specifically Prairie Ridge High School, for students in high school.

== Geography ==
According to the 2010 census, Prairie Grove has a total area of 5.714 square miles (14.80 km^{2}), of which 5.71 square miles (14.79 km^{2}) (or 99.93%) is land and 0.004 square miles (0.01 km^{2}) (or 0.07%) is water.

== Demographics ==
Historical population
Census	Pop.	Note	%±
1980	680		—
1990	654		−3.8%
2000	960		46.8%
2010	1,904		98.3%
2020	1,963		3.1%
U.S. Decennial Census; 2010 2020

=== Racial and ethnic composition ===
Prairie Grove village, Illinois – Racial and ethnic composition Note: the US Census treats Hispanic/Latino as an ethnic category. This table excludes Latinos from the racial categories and assigns them to a separate category. Hispanics/Latinos may be of any race.
Race / Ethnicity (NH = Non-Hispanic)	Pop 2000	Pop 2010	Pop 2020	% 2000	% 2010	% 2020
White alone (NH)	923	1,745	1,698	96.15%	91.65%	86.50%
Black or African American alone (NH)	6	15	12	0.63%	0.79%	0.61%
Native American or Alaska Native alone (NH)	2	2	3	0.21%	0.11%	0.15%
Asian alone (NH)	10	61	84	1.04%	3.20%	4.28%
Pacific Islander alone (NH)	0	0	0	0.00%	0.00%	0.00%
Other race alone (NH)	0	0	11	0.00%	0.00%	0.56%
Mixed race or Multiracial (NH)	7	23	50	0.73%	1.21%	2.55%
Hispanic or Latino (any race)	12	58	105	1.25%	3.05%	5.35%
Total	960	1,904	1,963	100.00%	100.00%	100.00%

=== 2020 census ===
As of the 2020 census, Prairie Grove had a population of 1,963. The median age was 44.0 years. 22.6% of residents were under the age of 18 and 16.3% of residents were 65 years of age or older. For every 100 females there were 99.5 males, and for every 100 females age 18 and over there were 100.3 males age 18 and over.

48.1% of residents lived in urban areas, while 51.9% lived in rural areas.

There were 710 households in Prairie Grove, of which 34.2% had children under the age of 18 living in them. Of all households, 64.9% were married-couple households, 13.8% were households with a male householder and no spouse or partner present, and 16.6% were households with a female householder and no spouse or partner present. About 19.0% of all households were made up of individuals and 6.7% had someone living alone who was 65 years of age or older.

There were 736 housing units, of which 3.5% were vacant. The homeowner vacancy rate was 0.5% and the rental vacancy rate was 4.5%.

=== 2000 census ===
As of the 2000 census, there were 960 people, 303 households, and 262 families residing in the village. The population density was 207.2 inhabitants per square mile (80.0/km^{2}). There were 308 housing units at an average density of 66.5 per square mile (25.7/km^{2}). The racial makeup of the village was 96.98% White, 0.62% African American, 0.21% Native American, 1.04% Asian, 0.42% from other races, and 0.73% from two or more races. Hispanic or Latino of any race were 1.25% of the population.

There were 303 households, out of which 46.2% had children under the age of 18 living with them, 80.5% were married couples living together, 3.6% had a female householder with no husband present, and 13.5% were non-families. 7.9% of all households were made up of individuals, and 2.3% had someone living alone who was 65 years of age or older. The average household size was 3.17 and the average family size was 3.37.

In the village, the population was spread out, with 31.0% under the age of 18, 6.1% from 18 to 24, 29.4% from 25 to 44, 27.3% from 45 to 64, and 6.1% who were 65 years of age or older. The median age was 37 years. For every 100 females, there were 97.1 males. For every 100 females age 18 and over, there were 102.4 males.

The median income for a household in the village was $93,361, and the median income for a family was $102,087. Males had a median income of $70,417 versus $30,313 for females. The per capita income for the village was $36,234. None of the families and 1.3% of the population were living below the poverty line, including no under eighteens and none of those over 64.

== Transportation ==
Pace provides bus service on Route 806 connecting Prairie Grove to Fox Lake, Crystal Lake and other destinations. Metra has plans to build a station in Prairie Grove to expand service on the McHenry branch of the Union Pacific Northwest Line.

== See also ==
- Crystal Lake, Illinois
- Bull Valley, Illinois
- Oakwood Hills, Illinois
