= Cary-Grove High School =

Public school in Illinois, United States

Coordinates: 42°13′17″N 88°14′30″W

Cary Grove High School

Location
- 2208 Three Oaks Road; Cary, Illinois; United States

Information
- Type: Public High School
- Established: 1961
- Oversight: Community High School District 155
- Superintendent: Neil Lesinski
- Principal: Dan Nicholas
- Teaching staff: 82.24 (on an FTE basis)
- Grades: 9-12
- Gender: 53% male 47% female
- Enrollment: 1,413 (2023-2024)
- Student to teacher ratio: 17.18
- Colors: navy blue white
- Mascot: Trojan
- Rival: Prairie Ridge High School
- National ranking: 884
- ACT average: 23.8
- Newspaper: CG Trojan Times
- Website: Cary-Grove High School
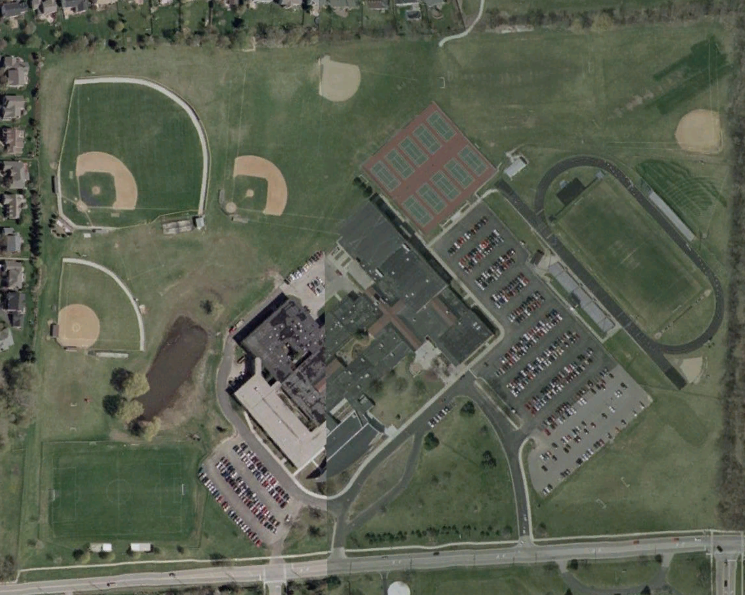

Cary-Grove High School is a high school in Cary, Illinois, a northwest suburb of Chicago, USA; it is part of Community High School District 155. In 1995, it was the subject of much media attention after the Fox River Grove level crossing accident that killed seven students. In 2006, on the anniversary of the accident, another Cary-Grove student, Justin Glassmyer, was killed at the same crossing.

Located approximately 38 miles northwest of Chicago, the school serves students from Cary, Fox River Grove, the far east side of Crystal Lake, and areas of Barrington, Trout Valley and Oakwood Hills.

== Student life ==
=== Athletics ===
The school's team mascot is the "Trojan."

The football team won four Class 6A state titles in 2009 against Providence Catholic High School, in 2018 against Crete-Monee High School, in 2021 and 2023 against East St. Louis High School. They finished three second places in 2004 (7A), 2012 (6A), and 2014 (7A).

The 2009 Women's Volleyball team won the state title. It was the first state title in the school's history. In 2010, the Volleyball team was ranked Number 1 in the nation by various sources, but lost the state final game to Lyons Township High School snapping their 57 match win streak and ended their season at 41-1 overall.

In 2011, the Volleyball team was runner up in the state, marking the third year in a row that the team made it to the state finals.

In 2011, Carly Loeffel became the second individual and first female athlete to win a Track and Field championship in the high jump by jumping 5'8". The other individual champion was Brad Thornton in the 300m hurdles back in 2003.

In 2012, also in track and field, Josh Freeman became the first person in school history, and in the history of the Fox Valley Conference, to win two individual state championships in the same year when he won the shot put and discus state titles. His shot put throw of 66'0" ranks 3rd all-time in Illinois state history.

=== Music ===
As of 2012, 16 different groups and ensembles perform at the school. These bands include the A Cappella Singers, Swing Choir, Jazz Choir, Bel Canto Choir, Concert Band, Wind Ensemble, Marching Band, Drumline, Pep Band and Jazz Ensemble. The band is headed by Marty Magnini. A new Fine Arts Center opened in September 2015 to replace the school's original auditorium, which was built in 1965. The new facility cost $8.5 million and features updated technology, more dressing rooms, rehearsal space, a scenery shop and an enlarged stage. The private-public partnership with the Cary-Grove Fine Arts Foundation was the first for the school district.

Every November, all chorus students participate in ¨Fall Follies¨, a concert that includes singing, dancing, and skits. Swing Choir, Beginners Chorus, Advanced Mixed Chorus, Bel Canto Choir, A Cappella Singers, and Jazz Choir all participate.

== History ==
Cary Grove was opened in 1961. Originally, the school colors (purple and white) and the tune for the school song were borrowed from Northwestern University. In 1978, while the school colors remained purple and white, the sports, cheerleader and band uniforms became navy and white. The school song remained the Northwestern University school song. During the 1980s, the change to navy blue and white became official.

=== Notable events ===
In 1995, Cary-Grove High school received national media attention due to a tragic bus accident involving a train and school bus in Fox-River-Grove.

== Academics ==
Cary-Grove's mission statement is "For each student, we will inspire a love for learning, empower the pursuit of personal aspirations, and nurture the desire to contribute to the world."

Cary-Grove currently offers over 200 courses for students to choose from. Of those classes, 20 are Advanced Placement.

The graduation rate is 97%, and 92.7% intend to continue their education in some form after graduation The Advanced Placement (AP) exam rate is 22%, with 88% of test taken earning an honor score of 3-5

=== Faculty and class size ===
Of the 111 teachers, 86% of them have a master's degree or higher.

The school also employs five counselors, two social workers, and one psychologist on its student services team. The average classroom size is 18 students per class.

==== Recognition ====
As of 2019, Cary-Grove High School was determined to belong among the country's top schools according to The U.S. News & World Report. The rankings placed Cary-Grove at number 884 nationally and 41st in Illinois. The national ranking puts CG at least in the top 3.8% of the nation’s public high schools.

Cary-Grove High School has also earned national recognition, ranking 323 out of 500 in an article by Newsweek listing "America's Top High Schools in 2015"

== Notable alumni ==
- Patrick Burns (paranormal investigator) (1987), star of Haunting Evidence
- Drew Conner (2012), midfielder with the Chicago Fire
- Jeff Dee (1979), artist, game designer, atheist activist
- Evan Dollard (2000), athlete known for American Gladiators
- Quinn Priester (2019), drafted by the Pittsburgh Pirates in the 18th position of the first round of the 2019 MLB draft.
- Jack Wenninger (2020), baseball player in the New York Mets organization
- Paul Wertico (1971), jazz drummer (member of the Pat Metheny Group for many years), winner of 7 Grammy Awards
- Addison West (2019), Consensus First Team All American
