= Hartland Township, Illinois =

Coordinates: 42°22′24″N 88°31′58″W

Hartland Township
- Township
- Location in McHenry County
- Country: United States
- State: Illinois
- County: McHenry
- Established: November 6, 1849

Area
  - Total: 35.83 sq mi (92.8 km^{2})
  - Land: 35.69 sq mi (92.4 km^{2})
  - Water: 0.14 sq mi (0.36 km^{2}) 0.39%

Population (2010)
  - Estimate (2016): 1,979
  - Density: 56.9/sq mi (22.0/km^{2})
- Time zone: UTC-6 (CST)
  - Summer (DST): UTC-5 (CDT)
- FIPS code: 17-111-33305
- Website: hartlandtownshipil.org

Hartland Township is located in McHenry County, Illinois. As of the 2010 census, its population was 2,031, and it contained 780 housing units. It includes the census-designated place of Hartland.

== Geography ==
According to the 2010 census, the township has a total area of 35.83 square miles (92.8 km^{2}), of which 35.69 square miles (92.4 km^{2}) (or 99.61%) is land and 0.14 square miles (0.36 km^{2}) (or 0.39%) is water.

== Demographics ==
Historical population
Census	Pop.	Note	%±
2016 (est.)	1,979
U.S. Decennial Census
