= Orson Rogers House =

Historic house in Illinois, United States

- U.S. National Register of Historic Places
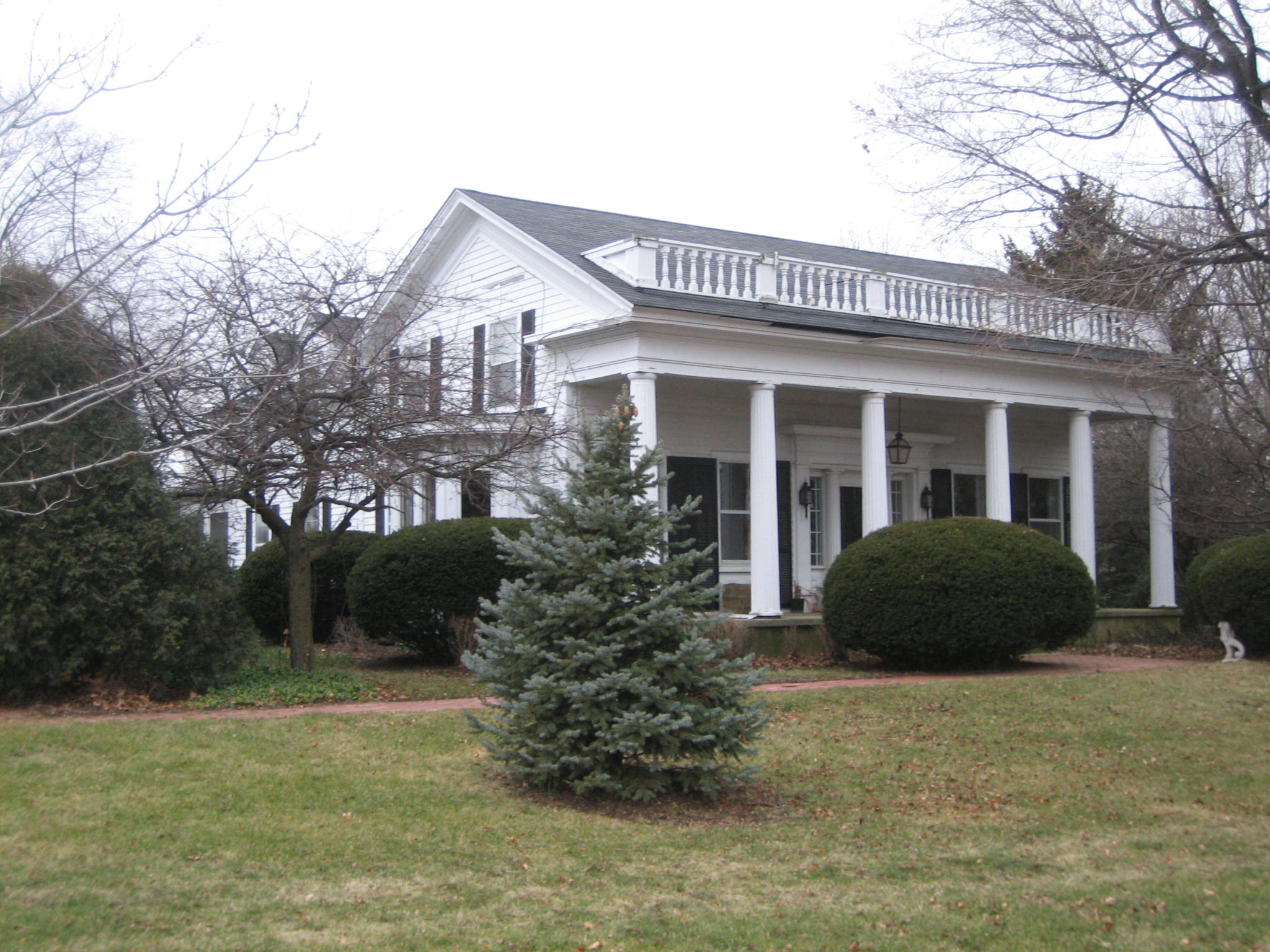
- The Orson Rogers House on the eastern outskirts of Marengo, Illinois.

- Location within Illinois Location within the United States
- Location: Marengo, McHenry County, Illinois
- Coordinates: 42°15′3″N 88°36′18″W
- Area: 1.4 acres (0.57 ha)
- Built: c. 1847
- NRHP reference No.: 79003114
- Added to NRHP: June 22, 1979

The Orson Rogers House is listed on the National Register of Historic Places and located in the McHenry County, Illinois city of Marengo. The property consists of several outbuildings, currently and in the past, as well, those buildings are and were mostly agriculture related.

== Ownership ==
The home was owned by the Orson Rogers family from 1847 until around 1869. William Boies owned the farmstead from 1869 and held it until the early part of the 20th century. Boies was the owner of a well-known dairy and creamery. From 1920 until 1961 Jesse Jackson owned the Rogers House and in 1961 it was purchased by Willis and Wilma Brown. Willis Brown had inherited the home from his grandparents. Robert and Beverly Kling purchased the home in 1979, the year it was listed on the National Register of Historic Places. Today the home is still owned by their daughter Candace Kling.

== Orson Rogers ==
Orson Rogers, the home's namesake, was born in Middletown, Vermont in 1814. In the late 1830s he and his wife, Mary, moved, by wagon, from Vermont to the Marengo, Illinois area. Rogers' parents accompanied him and his wife on the relocation. Originally, Rogers settled in a town he liked called Coral. In the 1840s the area was home to a number of Native American settlements and the Rogers' were among the first white settlers of the Marengo area. Rogers built the first log cabin schoolhouse in the area and taught there as well. In the 1850s his farming savvy led him to purchase the revolutionary McCormick Reapers.
