= Hartland, Illinois =

- Census-designated place
- Location within Illinois Location within the United States
- Coordinates: 42°21′47″N 88°30′31″W
- Country: United States
- State: Illinois
- County: McHenry
- Township: Hartland

Area
  - Total: 0.32 sq mi (0.83 km^{2})
  - Land: 0.32 sq mi (0.83 km^{2})
  - Water: 0 sq mi (0.00 km^{2})
- Elevation: 925 ft (282 m)

Population (2020)
  - Total: 157
  - Density: 491.6/sq mi (189.81/km^{2})
- Time zone: UTC-6 (Central (CST))
  - Summer (DST): UTC-5 (CDT)
- Area codes: 815 & 779
- GNIS feature ID: 2806497

Hartland is an unincorporated community and census-designated place in McHenry County, Illinois, United States. It was named a CDP before the 2020 census, at which time it had a population of 157.

== Geography ==
The historical center of the community is found on Nelson Road (County Highway A-28), immediately east of the Union Pacific Railroad, which traverses the area on a northwest–southeast angle. The junction of Hartland Road (County Highway T-68) is found a short distance west of this grade crossing. In terms of the Public Land Survey System, Hartland is located near the midpoint of the dividing line between Sections 22 and 23, Township 45 North, Range 6 East of the Third Principal Meridian. The heart of the old community is on the Section 23 side of the line. Hartland is served by the Woodstock, Illinois 60098 post office.

== Demographics ==
Historical population
Census	Pop.	Note	%±
2020	157		—
U.S. Decennial Census; 2020

Hartland first appeared as a census designated place in the 2020 U.S. census.

=== 2020 census ===
Hartland CDP, Illinois – Racial and ethnic composition Note: the US Census treats Hispanic/Latino as an ethnic category. This table excludes Latinos from the racial categories and assigns them to a separate category. Hispanics/Latinos may be of any race.
Race / Ethnicity (NH = Non-Hispanic)	Pop 2020	% 2020
White alone (NH)	126	80.25%
Black or African American alone (NH)	4	2.55%
Native American or Alaska Native alone (NH)	0	0.00%
Asian alone (NH)	0	0.00%
Native Hawaiian or Pacific Islander alone (NH)	0	0.00%
Other race alone (NH)	4	2.55%
Mixed race or Multiracial (NH)	6	3.82%
Hispanic or Latino (any race)	17	10.83%
Total	157	100.00%

== Points of interest ==
In addition to the rustic buildings of the old town, Hartland is home to the Hartland Township facility, 15813 Nelson Road; the McHenry County Division of Transportation office, 16111 Nelson Road; and the Valley Hi, County Nursing Home, 2406 Hartland Road.

== See also ==
- Hartland Township
