= Crystal Lake Central High School =

Coordinates: 42°14′13″N 88°19′21″W

Location
- 45 Franklin St; Crystal Lake, Illinois 60014; United States

Information
- Type: Public secondary
- Established: 1924
- Oversight: Community High School District 155
- Principal: Carson Sterchi
- Teaching staff: 83.67 (FTE)
- Grades: 9–12
- Enrollment: 1,498 (2023-2024)
- Student to teacher ratio: 17.90
- Colors: Orange and black
- Nickname: Tigers
- Website: Crystal Lake Central High School
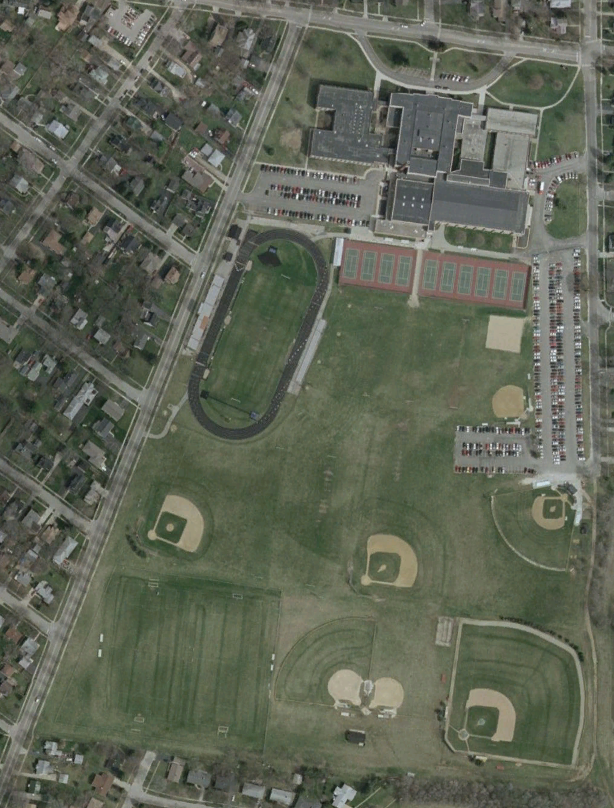

Crystal Lake Central High School, often referred to as "Central" or "CLC," is the oldest of the three high schools in Crystal Lake, Illinois, United States.

== History ==
Crystal Lake Central High School opened its doors in 1924 as Crystal Lake Community High School. It was enlarged in 1928 with the first addition; a second addition (including the "Fieldhouse") was completed in 1953. Another addition was completed to the west-end of the building in the 1964–1965 school year. Prior to its creation, area high school students attended Union School beginning in 1884. Crystal Lake Community (and Union School before it) served students in grades 9–12 from Crystal Lake, Cary, and the surrounding areas of McHenry County. Students in the first graduating class at Crystal Lake Community (Class of 1924) began their school year at Union School and moved to the new high school building just one month before graduation. Prior to relocating, the school was part of the Union School campus located at what is now Husmann Elementary School. The school was renamed as Crystal Lake Central in 1978 when Crystal Lake South opened, reaching an approximate maximum student population of 2,100 in 1978. Crystal Lake Central once was the least populated of Community High School District 155's four high schools, as well as the oldest. However, as of the 2015–2016 school year, it is the second smallest, with Prairie Ridge High School having a smaller population size.

== Athletics ==
Its mascot is the Tiger, while its school colors are orange and black.

The school captured its first individual state title in 1942, when Paul Behan won the state discus championship. Since then, Central's student-athletes have won Illinois High School Association state titles in boys track and field, boys baseball, girls track and field, wrestling, girls tennis (mid 1970s), and girls cross country.

Notable team finishes at the Illinois state level include:

- Boys Baseball – 4th, 2008; IHSA Class 3A State Champions, 2024
- Boys Cross Country – IHSA State Champions, 1995; 3rd, 2001.
- Girls Cross Country – 2nd, 2008; 2nd, 2011
- Girls Soccer - IHSA Class 2A State Champions, 2024, 2026
- Girls Tennis – 2nd, 1976; 2nd, 1977
- Girls Volleyball – 1st; 2007 (Class 3A IHSA State champions with an undefeated record of 42–0. Crystal Lake Central was ranked No. 6 on the top 100 teams in the nation by PrepVolleyball.com.; 4th (3A), 2009; 3rd (4A), 2017
- Wrestling – 3rd, 2009; 2nd, 2010; 2nd, 2011; 4th, 2014
- Dance Team – Inaugural IHSA State Champions, 2013
- Cheer Team – IHSA State Champions, 2022
- Girls Lacrosse - 4th, 2025

== Notable alumni ==
- Sean Evans - Class of 2004 - Interviewer most famous for the series Hot Ones
- Joe Affrunti – Class of 1999 – PGA tour golfer
- Tom Amandes – Class of 1977. Actor best known for roles on Everwood and The Untouchables (1993 TV series).
- Jason Babinsky – Class of 1994. Stage and screen actor perhaps best known for playing Howell on The Good Wife. On stage, he was part of the Broadway cast of Billy Elliot the Musical, won the Kevin Kline Awards for Lead Actor in a Play for The Bomb-itty of Errors, and was lauded for his role in Stockholm.
- Charlie Behan – 1930s. Winner of Navy Cross and killed in action during Okinawa Battle of Sugar Loaf Hill. Detroit Lions professional football player and brother of IHSA champion Paul Behan.
- John Bock – Class of 1989. Former NFL center for the New York Jets (1995) and Miami Dolphins (1996–2000).
- Elaine Bradley – Class of 1997. Drummer and vocalist for the Neon Trees.
- Rob Elgas – Class of 1992. Reporter, news anchor NBC Channel 5 Chicago WMAQ-TV.
- Mike Felumlee – Class of 1993. Former drummer, Smoking Popes and Alkaline Trio.
- Jen Golbeck – Class of 1995. Computer scientist at the University of Maryland, College Park and director of the University of Maryland Human - Computer Interaction Lab.
- Erin Jauch- Class of 2012. World Champion gymnast, as well as several other US gymnastics titles.
- Bob Kessler – Class of 1990. Reporter, news anchor WGN Radio 720 AM Chicago. Former producer "Ramsey Lewis Morning Show."
- Mike Myers – Class of 1987. Pitcher for the Milwaukee Brewers, Colorado Rockies, Arizona Diamondbacks, Seattle Mariners, Boston Red Sox, New York Yankees, and Chicago White Sox
- Chuck Swenson – Class of 1972. Former head men's basketball coach, The College of William & Mary. Former assistant coach to Mike Krzyzewski at Army and Duke University. Currently Administrative Assistant to University of Michigan Basketball program.
- Connor Sadzeck - professional baseball pitcher for the Pittsburgh Pirates of Major League Baseball (MLB).
- Grace Kinstler - 2021 American Idol contestant - 3rd place
