= Ridgefield High School =

Ridgefield High School may refer to:

- Ridgefield High School (Ridgefield, Connecticut), Ridgefield, Connecticut
- Ridgefield Memorial High School, Ridgefield, New Jersey
- Ridgefield High School (Ridgefield, Washington), Ridgefield, Washington
