= Burtons Bridge, Illinois =

- Census-designated place
- Location within Illinois Location within the United States
- Coordinates: 42°16′40″N 88°13′49″W
- Country: United States
- State: Illinois
- County: McHenry
- Township: Nunda

Area
  - Total: 0.12 sq mi (0.32 km^{2})
  - Land: 0.12 sq mi (0.32 km^{2})
  - Water: 0 sq mi (0.00 km^{2})
- Elevation: 742 ft (226 m)

Population (2020)
  - Total: 226
  - Density: 1,836.8/sq mi (709.21/km^{2})
- Time zone: UTC-6 (Central (CST))
  - Summer (DST): UTC-5 (CDT)
- Area codes: 815 & 779
- FIPS code: 17-10045
- GNIS feature ID: 2806464

Burtons Bridge is an unincorporated community and census-designated place in McHenry County, Illinois, United States. Burtons Bridge is located on the west bank of the Fox River, 1 mile (1.6 km) south of Holiday Hills. It was named a CDP for the 2020 census, at which time it had a population of 226.

== Demographics ==
Historical population
Census	Pop.	Note	%±
2020	226		—
U.S. Decennial Census; 2020

Burtons Bridge first appeared as a census designated place in the 2020 U.S. census.

=== 2020 census ===
Burtons Bridge CDP, Illinois – Racial and ethnic composition Note: the US Census treats Hispanic/Latino as an ethnic category. This table excludes Latinos from the racial categories and assigns them to a separate category. Hispanics/Latinos may be of any race.
Race / Ethnicity (NH = Non-Hispanic)	Pop 2020	% 2020
White alone (NH)	170	75.22%
Black or African American alone (NH)	9	3.98%
Native American or Alaska Native alone (NH)	0	0.00%
Asian alone (NH)	2	0.88%
Native Hawaiian or Pacific Islander alone (NH)	1	0.44%
Other race alone (NH)	2	0.88%
Mixed race or Multiracial (NH)	8	3.54%
Hispanic or Latino (any race)	34	15.04%
Total	226	100.00%
