= Dorr Township, Illinois =

Coordinates: 42°17′07″N 88°25′00″W

Dorr Township
- Township
- Flag Logo

- Location in McHenry County
- Country: United States
- State: Illinois
- County: McHenry
- Established: November 6, 1849

Area
  - Total: 36 sq mi (93 km^{2})
  - Land: 35.98 sq mi (93.2 km^{2})
  - Water: 0.01 sq mi (0.026 km^{2}) 0.03%

Population (2020)
  - Total: 21,752
  - Density: 581.2/sq mi (224.4/km^{2})
- Time zone: UTC-6 (CST)
  - Summer (DST): UTC-5 (CDT)
- FIPS code: 17-111-20396
- Website: Dorr Township Official Web Site

Dorr Township is located in McHenry County, Illinois. As of the 2020 census, its population was 21,752 and it contained 8,929 housing units. Dorr Township changed its name from Centre Township on December 28, 1850. It includes the census-designated place of Ridgefield.

== History ==
Dorr Township is named after Governor Thomas Wilson Dorr of Rhode Island. Governor Dorr helped to modernize voting in America by removing arcane age limitations and fighting for universal white male suffrage. Dorr was arrested and tried for treason before the Rhode Island Supreme Court. In 1844 he was committed to prison with a life sentence of solitary confinement and hard labor. He was released after 12 months but his health never fully recovered.

== Geography ==
According to the 2010 census, the township has a total area of 36 square miles (93 km^{2}), of which 35.98 square miles (93.2 km^{2}) (or 99.94%) is land and 0.01 square miles (0.026 km^{2}) (or 0.03%) is water.

Dorr Township is one of seventeen townships in McHenry County. It covers portions of Woodstock, Crystal Lake, Lakewood and Bull Valley. Dorr Township covers 34 1/2 miles of road.

== Demographics ==
Historical population
Census	Pop.	Note	%±
2010	20,911		—
2020	21,572		3.2%
U.S. Decennial Census
