= Oakwood Hills, Illinois =

- Village
- Village of Oakwood Hills
- Seal

- Location in McHenry County, Illinois
- Coordinates: 42°15′02″N 88°14′48″W
- Country: United States
- State: Illinois
- County: McHenry
- Townships: Nunda, Algonquin
- Founded: 1959

Area
  - Total: 1.17 sq mi (3.04 km^{2})
  - Land: 1.09 sq mi (2.82 km^{2})
  - Water: 0.085 sq mi (0.22 km^{2})
- Elevation: 781 ft (238 m)

Population (2020)
  - Total: 2,076
  - Density: 1,907.7/sq mi (736.58/km^{2})
- Time zone: UTC-6 (CST)
  - Summer (DST): UTC-5 (CDT)
- ZIP code: 60013
- Area code: 224
- FIPS code: 17-55041
- GNIS feature ID: 2399549
- Website: www.oakwoodhills.org

Oakwood Hills is a village in McHenry County, Illinois, United States. It was founded in 1959. The population was 2,076 at the 2020 census.

== Geography ==
Oakwood Hills is located in southeastern McHenry County southeast of Prairie Grove, east of Crystal Lake, and north of Cary. The Fox River passes 1 mile (1.6 km) to the east. Downtown Chicago is 46 miles (74 km) to the southeast.

According to the U.S. Census Bureau, Oakwood Hills has a total area of 1.17 square miles (3.03 km^{2}), of which 1.09 square miles (2.82 km^{2}) are land and 0.08 square miles (0.21 km^{2}), or 7.17%, are water. Silver Lake is in the western part of the village, draining east to the Fox River. The unincorporated community of Silver Lake borders Oakwood Hills to the south.

== Demographics ==
=== Racial and ethnic composition ===
Oakwood Hills village, Illinois – Racial and ethnic composition Note: the US Census treats Hispanic/Latino as an ethnic category. This table excludes Latinos from the racial categories and assigns them to a separate category. Hispanics/Latinos may be of any race.
Race / Ethnicity (NH = Non-Hispanic)	Pop 2000	Pop 2010	Pop 2020	% 2000	% 2010	% 2020
White alone (NH)	2,083	1,931	1,731	94.94%	92.70%	83.38%
Black or African American alone (NH)	8	4	15	0.36%	0.19%	0.72%
Native American or Alaska Native alone (NH)	5	6	4	0.23%	0.29%	0.19%
Asian alone (NH)	7	37	29	0.32%	1.78%	1.40%
Pacific Islander alone (NH)	0	0	3	0.00%	0.00%	0.14%
Other race alone (NH)	0	3	13	0.00%	0.14%	0.63%
Mixed race or Multiracial (NH)	17	10	93	0.77%	0.48%	4.48%
Hispanic or Latino (any race)	74	92	188	3.37%	4.42%	9.06%
Total	2,194	2,083	2,076	100.00%	100.00%	100.00%

=== 2020 census ===
As of the 2020 census, Oakwood Hills had a population of 2,076. The median age was 42.4 years. 19.8% of residents were under the age of 18 and 16.2% of residents were 65 years of age or older. For every 100 females there were 104.5 males, and for every 100 females age 18 and over there were 100.6 males age 18 and over.

100.0% of residents lived in urban areas, while 0.0% lived in rural areas.

There were 771 households in Oakwood Hills, of which 32.3% had children under the age of 18 living in them. Of all households, 62.3% were married-couple households, 14.4% were households with a male householder and no spouse or partner present, and 14.9% were households with a female householder and no spouse or partner present. About 17.8% of all households were made up of individuals and 6.6% had someone living alone who was 65 years of age or older.

There were 808 housing units, of which 4.6% were vacant. The homeowner vacancy rate was 1.4% and the rental vacancy rate was 3.8%.

=== 2000 census ===
As of the census of 2000, there were 2,194 people, 719 households, and 598 families residing in the village. The population density was 1,943.9 inhabitants per square mile (750.5/km^{2}). There were 736 housing units at an average density of 652.1 per square mile (251.8/km^{2}). The racial makeup of the village was 98.04% White, 0.36% African American, 0.23% Native American, 0.32% Asian, 0.18% from other races, and 0.87% from two or more races. Hispanic or Latino of any race were 3.37% of the population.

There were 719 households, out of which 47.8% had children under the age of 18 living with them, 73.2% were married couples living together, 6.8% had a female householder with no husband present, and 16.8% were non-families. 11.8% of all households were made up of individuals, and 2.2% had someone living alone who was 65 years of age or older. The average household size was 3.05 and the average family size was 3.34.

In the village, the population was spread out, with 31.5% under the age of 18, 7.1% from 18 to 24, 35.2% from 25 to 44, 22.3% from 45 to 64, and 3.9% who were 65 years of age or older. The median age was 34 years. For every 100 females, there were 102.4 males. For every 100 females age 18 and over, there were 99.9 males.

The median income for a household in the village was $68,182, and the median income for a family was $70,875. Males had a median income of $52,051 versus $30,508 for females. The per capita income for the village was $26,397. About 3.9% of families and 5.0% of the population were below the poverty line, including 4.2% of those under age 18 and 4.3% of those age 65 or over.

Historical population
Census	Pop.	Note	%±
1960	213		—
1970	476		123.5%
1980	1,255		163.7%
1990	1,498		19.4%
2000	2,194		46.5%
2010	2,083		−5.1%
2020	2,076		−0.3%
U.S. Decennial Census; 2010 2020

== Proposed natural gas power plant ==
During the summer of 2014, the residents of Oakwood Hills and surrounding communities voiced their concerns about the creation of a power plant, by Northland Power and Enventure Partners, on property just north of the village. A group of concerned citizens hired expert Robert G. Abboud to create an impact assessment of the proposed project. The report emphasized risks to groundwater, air quality, and noise issues, among others as to why the project needed to be further studied.

== See also ==
- Lake Killarney (Illinois)
