= McHenry Township, Illinois =

Coordinates: 42°22′29″N 88°16′38″W

McHenry Township
- Township
- Location in McHenry County
- Country: United States
- State: Illinois
- County: McHenry
- Established: November 6, 1849

Area
  - Total: 48.03 sq mi (124.4 km^{2})
  - Land: 44.74 sq mi (115.9 km^{2})
  - Water: 3.3 sq mi (8.5 km^{2}) 6.87%

Dimensions
  - Length: 6.07 mi (9.77 km)
  - Width: 7.91 mi (12.73 km)

Population (2010)
  - Estimate (2016): 46,719
  - Density: 1,065.2/sq mi (411.3/km^{2})
- Time zone: UTC-6 (CST)
  - Summer (DST): UTC-5 (CDT)
- FIPS code: 17-111-45707
- Website: http://www.mchenrytownship.com/

McHenry Township is located in McHenry County, Illinois. As of the 2010 census, its population was 47,653 and it contained 19,120 housing units. McHenry Township shares the distinction with Nunda Township as being the two largest townships by land area in McHenry County, at 48.3 square miles (125 km^{2}) each.

The township was named for William McHenry, an Illinois politician.

== Geography ==
According to the 2010 census, the township has a total area of 48.03 square miles (124.4 km^{2}), of which 44.74 square miles (115.9 km^{2}) (or 93.15%) is land and 3.3 square miles (8.5 km^{2}) (or 6.87%) is water.

== Demographics ==
Historical population
Census	Pop.	Note	%±
1990	37,034		—
2000	41,740		12.7%
2010	47,653		14.2%
2016 (est.)	46,719		−2.0%
U.S. Decennial Census
