= Nunda Township, Illinois =

Coordinates: 42°17′01″N 88°16′42″W

Nunda Township
- Township
- Location in McHenry County
- Country: United States
- State: Illinois
- County: McHenry
- Established: November 6, 1849

Area
  - Total: 48.02 sq mi (124.4 km^{2})
  - Land: 46.77 sq mi (121.1 km^{2})
  - Water: 1.25 sq mi (3.2 km^{2}) 2.60%

Population (2010)
  - Estimate (2016): 37,608
  - Density: 817.7/sq mi (315.7/km^{2})
- Time zone: UTC-6 (CST)
  - Summer (DST): UTC-5 (CDT)
- FIPS code: 17-111-54495
- Website: http://www.nundatownship.com/

Nunda Township is located in McHenry County, Illinois. As of the 2010 census, its population was 38,245 and it contained 14,492 housing units. Nunda Township changed its name from Brooklyn Township on December 28, 1850. Nunda Township shares the distinction with McHenry Township as being the two largest townships by land area in McHenry County, at 48.3 square miles (130 km^{2}) each. It contains the census-designated place of Burtons Bridge.

Nunda is pronounced locally NUN-duh.

== Geography ==
According to the 2010 census, the township has a total area of 48.02 square miles (124.4 km^{2}), of which 46.77 square miles (121.1 km^{2}) (or 97.40%) is land and 1.25 square miles (3.2 km^{2}) (or 2.60%) is water.

== Demographics ==
Historical population
Census	Pop.	Note	%±
2016 (est.)	37,608
U.S. Decennial Census
