= Ridgefield, Illinois =

- Census-designated place
- Location within Illinois Location within the United States
- Coordinates: 42°16′15″N 88°21′43″W
- Country: United States
- State: Illinois
- County: McHenry
- Township: Dorr

Area
  - Total: 0.52 sq mi (1.35 km^{2})
  - Land: 0.52 sq mi (1.35 km^{2})
  - Water: 0 sq mi (0.00 km^{2})
- Elevation: 935 ft (285 m)

Population (2020)
  - Total: 210
  - Density: 402/sq mi (155.1/km^{2})
- Time zone: UTC-6 (Central (CST))
  - Summer (DST): UTC-5 (CDT)
- Area codes: 815 & 779
- GNIS feature ID: 2806551

Ridgefield is an unincorporated community and census-designated place in McHenry County, Illinois, United States. Ridgefield is 3 miles (4.8 km) northwest of Crystal Lake. It was named a CDP before the 2020 census, at which time it had a population of 210.

== History ==
A post office called Ridgefield was first established in 1858. The community was named from the ridges near the town site.

== Demographics ==
Historical population
| Census | Pop. | Note | %± |
|---|---|---|---|
| 2020 | 210 | | — |
U.S. Decennial Census; 2020

Ridgefield first appeared as a census designated place in the 2020 U.S. census.

=== 2020 census ===
Ridgefield CDP, Illinois – Racial and ethnic composition Note: the US Census treats Hispanic/Latino as an ethnic category. This table excludes Latinos from the racial categories and assigns them to a separate category. Hispanics/Latinos may be of any race.
| Race / Ethnicity (NH = Non-Hispanic) | Pop 2020 | % 2020 |
|---|---|---|
| White alone (NH) | 193 | 91.90% |
| Black or African American alone (NH) | 0 | 0.00% |
| Native American or Alaska Native alone (NH) | 0 | 0.00% |
| Asian alone (NH) | 0 | 0.00% |
| Native Hawaiian or Pacific Islander alone (NH) | 1 | 0.48% |
| Other race alone (NH) | 0 | 0.00% |
| Mixed race or Multiracial (NH) | 2 | 0.95% |
| Hispanic or Latino (any race) | 14 | 6.67% |
| Total | 210 | 100.00% |
