= National Register of Historic Places listings in McHenry County, Illinois =

Location of McHenry County in Illinois

This is a list of the National Register of Historic Places listings in McHenry County, Illinois.

This is intended to be a complete list of the properties and districts on the National Register of Historic Places in McHenry County, Illinois, United States. Latitude and longitude coordinates are provided for many National Register properties and districts; these locations may be seen together in a map.

There are 14 properties and districts listed on the National Register in the county.

This National Park Service list is complete through NPS recent listings posted May 22, 2026.

== Current listings ==
	Name on the Register	Image	Date listed	Location	City or town	Description
1	Count's House	Count's House	June 3, 1982 (#82002587)	3803 Waukegan; 42°20′36″N 88°16′17″W	McHenry	
2	Lucein Boneparte Covell House	Lucein Boneparte Covell House	January 26, 1989 (#88003246)	5805 Broadway; 42°28′35″N 88°18′42″W	Richmond	
3	Colby-Petersen Farm	Colby-Petersen Farm	March 13, 2020 (#100004853)	4112 McCullom Lake Rd. 42°21′44″N 88°16′41″W	McHenry	
4	Crystal Lake Chicago and North Western Railway Company Depot	Crystal Lake Chicago and North Western Railway Company Depot	April 9, 2026 (#100012895)	70 East Woodstock Street and Grant Street; 42°14′39″N 88°19′03″W	Crystal Lake	
5	Christian Geister House	Christian Geister House	September 25, 2007 (#07000453)	302 S. Main St. 42°09′55″N 88°17′38″W	Algonquin	
6	Charles H. Hibbard House	Charles H. Hibbard House	February 14, 1979 (#79003113)	413 W. Grant Hwy. 42°14′54″N 88°36′45″W	Marengo	
7	Memorial Hall	Memorial Hall	August 19, 1993 (#93000839)	10308 Main St. 42°28′32″N 88°18′21″W	Richmond	
8	Old McHenry County Courthouse	Old McHenry County Courthouse	November 1, 1974 (#74002183)	City Sq. 42°18′54″N 88°26′54″W	Woodstock	
9	Col. Gustavus A. Palmer House	Col. Gustavus A. Palmer House	May 24, 1985 (#85001127)	5516 Terra Cotta Rd. 42°14′56″N 88°17′46″W	Crystal Lake	
10	Orson Rogers House	Orson Rogers House	June 22, 1979 (#79003114)	E of Marengo at 19621 E. Grant St. 42°14′11″N 88°34′51″W	Marengo	
11	George Stickney House	George Stickney House	May 14, 1979 (#79003115)	NE of Woodstock at 1904 Cherry Valley Rd. 42°18′03″N 88°21′09″W	Bull Valley	
12	Terwilliger House	Terwilliger House	May 14, 1979 (#79003116)	E of Woodstock at Mason Hill and Cherry Valley Rds. 42°18′22″N 88°21′12″W	Bull Valley	
13	Woodstock Opera House	Woodstock Opera House	July 17, 1974 (#74002184)	119 Van Buren St. 42°18′52″N 88°26′52″W	Woodstock	
14	Woodstock Square Historic District	Woodstock Square Historic District	November 12, 1982 (#82000399)	Roughly bounded by Calhoun, Throop, Cass, Main, C and NW RR Tracks, and Jefferson Sts. 42°18′55″N 88°26′52″W	Woodstock	

== See also ==
- List of National Historic Landmarks in Illinois
- National Register of Historic Places listings in Illinois
