= McHenry, Illinois =

- City
- City of McHenry
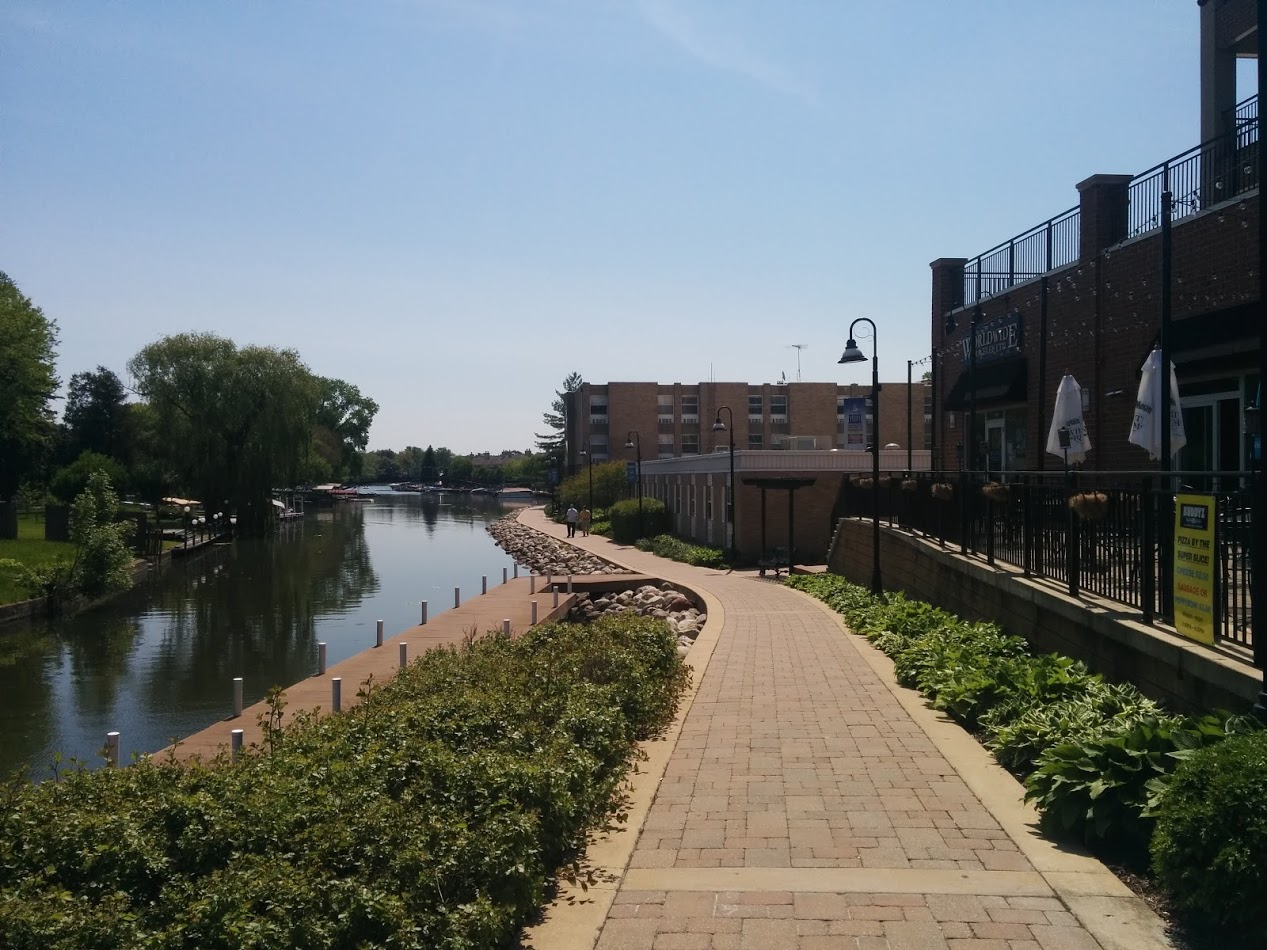
- The McHenry Riverwalk

- Logo
- Nickname: "Heart of the Fox River"
- Location of McHenry in McHenry County, Illinois

- Location of McHenry within Illinois McHenry, Illinois (the United States)
- Coordinates: 42°20′31″N 88°16′24″W
- Country: United States
- State: Illinois
- County: McHenry
- Townships: McHenry, Nunda, Grant, Wauconda
- Founded: May 10, 1836
- Incorporated (village): 1872
- Named for: William McHenry

Government
  - Type: Mayor–council government

Area
  - Total: 14.96 sq mi (38.74 km^{2})
  - Land: 14.54 sq mi (37.65 km^{2})
  - Water: 0.42 sq mi (1.09 km^{2})
- Elevation: 810 ft (250 m)

Population (2020)
  - Total: 27,135
  - Density: 1,866.7/sq mi (720.74/km^{2})
- Time zone: UTC−6 (CST)
  - Summer (DST): UTC−5 (CDT)
- ZIP code: 60050 and 60051
- Area code: 815 and 779
- FIPS code: 17-45694
- GNIS feature ID: 2395070
- Website: cityofmchenry.org

McHenry is a city in McHenry County, Illinois, United States. It is located about 46 miles northwest of Chicago. Per the 2020 census, the population was 27,135. McHenry was at one time the county seat of McHenry County, which once included adjoining Lake County to the east. McHenry took its name from the county, which was named for Major William McHenry, a prominent US Army officer in the Black Hawk War.

It rests at an elevation of 797 feet and the Fox River flows through the eastern portion of the city. It is surrounded by natural lakes and streams, grassy moraine hills, gravel banks and shallow nutrient-rich peat bogs, remnants of receding glaciers from the last ice age. Moraine Hills State Park, Glacial Park Conservation Area, and Volo Bog State Natural Area preserve some of these natural features.

== History ==
=== 19th century ===
In the 1830s various settlers arrived in the area and created the foundation for McHenry. Some of the family names can still be seen today: McCullom, McLean, Boone, and Wheeler.

George Gage came to the area in 1835 and purchased a plot of land west of the Fox River. This area eventually came to be known as Gagetown. In 1854, George Gage played an instrumental role in bringing the railroad to the city. Gagetown was eventually renamed to West McHenry.

In 1851, a dam was built on Boone Creek which created Mill Pond. The pond encompassed an area between today's rail road tracks and Route 31 and north of Waukegan Road.

In 1860, the historical Count's House was completed.

On August 4, 1875, the first issue of the city newspaper, the McHenry Plaindealer, was published by Jay Van Slyke.

In 1880, the first bridge in McHenry was built at Pearl Street.

=== 20th century ===
On March 30, 1908, a train bound for Ringwood crashed near the McHenry train depot. One person was killed.

In 1929, Mill Pond was drained by removing the dam on Boone Creek.

The original single lane Pearl Street bridge was built 1880–1881 over Fox River. The iron truss bridge was dismantled and a section of it was relocated to Terra Cotta Industries in Crystal Lake in Nov. 1976 to be used as a pedestrian bridge. Other sections remain in storage. The original bridge was replaced with a concrete bridge.

In 1985, the McHenry Plaindealer newspaper became part of the Northwest Herald.

== Geography ==
McHenry is located 46 miles northwest of Chicago in northeastern Illinois on the Fox River. According to the 2020 census, McHenry has a total area of 14.50 square miles (37.55 km^{2}) McHenry lies within the Fox River Valley, and its downtown area is situated on that river. "The Heart of the Fox River" is the city's motto.

The 48 acre Lake Defiance is the centerpiece of Moraine Hills State Park on the east end of town. It is a glacial lake surrounded by now wooded kames and moraines.

=== Climate ===
Typically climate and weather in McHenry year-round is similar to Chicago's, though sometimes it is warmer in summer, and colder in winter. The all-time record high temperature is 103 °F (39 °C), set on July 4, 1974, while the all-time record low is −30 °F (−34 °C), set on January 31, 2019.

Climate data for McHenry, Illinois, 1991–2020 normals, extremes 1992–present
Month	Jan	Feb	Mar	Apr	May	Jun	Jul	Aug	Sep	Oct	Nov	Dec	Year
Record high °F (°C)	62 (17)	78 (26)	83 (28)	90 (32)	99 (37)	100 (38)	101 (38)	98 (37)	96 (36)	90 (32)	78 (26)	68 (20)	101 (38)
Mean maximum °F (°C)	50.1 (10.1)	52.2 (11.2)	67.6 (19.8)	79.3 (26.3)	88.3 (31.3)	91.3 (32.9)	92.2 (33.4)	90.4 (32.4)	89.2 (31.8)	81.1 (27.3)	67.2 (19.6)	54.9 (12.7)	92.2 (33.4)
Mean daily maximum °F (°C)	30.6 (−0.8)	34.6 (1.4)	46.0 (7.8)	58.8 (14.9)	70.4 (21.3)	80.2 (26.8)	84.2 (29.0)	82.3 (27.9)	75.7 (24.3)	63.0 (17.2)	48.1 (8.9)	35.9 (2.2)	59.2 (15.1)
Daily mean °F (°C)	21.7 (−5.7)	25.4 (−3.7)	35.9 (2.2)	47.7 (8.7)	58.8 (14.9)	68.6 (20.3)	72.8 (22.7)	71.0 (21.7)	63.6 (17.6)	51.3 (10.7)	38.7 (3.7)	27.6 (−2.4)	48.6 (9.2)
Mean daily minimum °F (°C)	12.9 (−10.6)	16.2 (−8.8)	25.9 (−3.4)	36.6 (2.6)	47.2 (8.4)	57.0 (13.9)	61.5 (16.4)	59.7 (15.4)	51.4 (10.8)	39.6 (4.2)	29.4 (−1.4)	19.3 (−7.1)	38.1 (3.4)
Mean minimum °F (°C)	−9.2 (−22.9)	−6.5 (−21.4)	6.6 (−14.1)	22.5 (−5.3)	33.1 (0.6)	44.3 (6.8)	50.2 (10.1)	47.5 (8.6)	38.7 (3.7)	26.3 (−3.2)	13.3 (−10.4)	−0.5 (−18.1)	−14.0 (−25.6)
Record low °F (°C)	−32 (−36)	−23 (−31)	−13 (−25)	14 (−10)	26 (−3)	35 (2)	44 (7)	40 (4)	28 (−2)	22 (−6)	4 (−16)	−19 (−28)	−32 (−36)
Average precipitation inches (mm)	1.65 (42)	1.56 (40)	2.21 (56)	3.63 (92)	4.47 (114)	4.81 (122)	3.80 (97)	3.70 (94)	3.61 (92)	3.21 (82)	2.38 (60)	1.94 (49)	36.97 (940)
Average snowfall inches (cm)	11.0 (28)	8.9 (23)	3.9 (9.9)	1.0 (2.5)	0.0 (0.0)	0.0 (0.0)	0.0 (0.0)	0.0 (0.0)	0.0 (0.0)	0.1 (0.25)	1.4 (3.6)	8.2 (21)	34.5 (88.25)
Average precipitation days (≥ 0.01 in)	9.5	8.2	9.2	11.3	13.3	11.9	9.7	9.9	9.1	10.0	8.3	8.9	119.3
Average snowy days (≥ 0.1 in)	7.1	5.2	2.8	0.7	0.0	0.0	0.0	0.0	0.0	0.0	1.3	5.2	22.3
Source 1: NOAA
Source 2: National Weather Service (mean maxima/minima 2006–2020)

== Demographics ==
Historical population
Census	Pop.	Note	%±
1880	874		—
1890	979		12.0%
1900	1,013		3.5%
1910	1,031		1.8%
1920	1,146		11.2%
1930	1,354		18.2%
1940	1,596		17.9%
1950	2,080		30.3%
1960	3,336		60.4%
1970	6,772		103.0%
1980	10,737		58.5%
1990	16,177		50.7%
2000	21,501		32.9%
2010	26,992		25.5%
2020	27,135		0.5%
2023 (est.)	28,251		4.1%
U.S. Decennial Census; 2010 2020

=== Racial and ethnic composition ===
McHenry, Illinois – Racial and ethnic composition Note: the US Census treats Hispanic/Latino as an ethnic category. This table excludes Latinos from the racial categories and assigns them to a separate category. Hispanics/Latinos may be of any race.
Race / Ethnicity (NH = Non-Hispanic)	Pop 2000	Pop 2010	Pop 2020	% 2000	% 2010	% 2020
White alone (NH)	19,536	22,661	21,144	90.86%	83.95%	77.92%
Black or African American alone (NH)	62	173	280	0.29%	0.64%	1.03%
Native American or Alaska Native alone (NH)	43	45	20	0.20%	0.17%	0.07%
Asian alone (NH)	191	411	493	0.89%	1.52%	1.82%
Native Hawaiian or Pacific Islander alone (NH)	8	5	4	0.04%	0.02%	0.01%
Other race alone (NH)	13	7	40	0.06%	0.03%	0.15%
Mixed race or Multiracial (NH)	121	240	954	0.56%	0.89%	3.52%
Hispanic or Latino (any race)	1,527	3,450	4,200	7.10%	12.78%	15.48%
Total	21,501	26,992	27,135	100.00%	100.00%	100.00%

=== 2020 census ===
As of the 2020 census, McHenry had a population of 27,135. The median age was 41.3 years. 21.3% of residents were under the age of 18 and 17.2% of residents were 65 years of age or older. For every 100 females there were 94.6 males, and for every 100 females age 18 and over there were 92.0 males age 18 and over.

96.8% of residents lived in urban areas, while 3.2% lived in rural areas.

There were 10,685 households in McHenry, of which 29.1% had children under the age of 18 living in them. Of all households, 48.5% were married-couple households, 17.1% were households with a male householder and no spouse or partner present, and 26.2% were households with a female householder and no spouse or partner present. About 27.7% of all households were made up of individuals and 12.7% had someone living alone who was 65 years of age or older.

There were 11,154 housing units, of which 4.2% were vacant. The homeowner vacancy rate was 1.3% and the rental vacancy rate was 5.4%.

Racial composition as of the 2020 census
Race	Number	Percent
White	21,893	80.7%
Black or African American	297	1.1%
American Indian and Alaska Native	143	0.5%
Asian	502	1.9%
Native Hawaiian and Other Pacific Islander	7	0.0%
Some other race	1,769	6.5%
Two or more races	2,524	9.3%
Hispanic or Latino (of any race)	4,200	15.5%

=== 2000 census ===
The population density was 1,850.2 inhabitants per square mile (714.4/km^{2}). There were 8,127 housing units at an average density of 699.4 per square mile (270.0/km^{2}). The racial makeup of the city was 94.18% White, 0.35% African American, 0.21% Native American, 0.89% Asian, 0.04% Pacific Islander, 3.31% from other races, and 1.02% from two or more races. Hispanic or Latino people of any race were 7.10% of the population.

There were 7,872 households, of which 38.7% had children under the age of 18 living with them, 57.2% were married couples living together, 9.7% had a female householder with no husband present, and 29.4% were non-families. 24.7% of all households were made up of individuals, and 9.9% had someone living alone who was 65 years of age or older. The average household size was 2.70 and the average family size was 3.25.

Age distribution was 28.5% under the age of 18, 7.8% from 18 to 24, 32.7% from 25 to 44, 19.9% from 45 to 64, and 11.0% who were 65 years of age or older. The median age was 34 years. For every 100 females, there were 94.8 males. For every 100 females age 18 and over, there were 91.2 males.

The median household income was $55,759, and the median family income was $66,040. Males had a median income of $46,552 versus $29,808 for females. The per capita income for the city was $23,272. About 3.8% of families and 4.6% of the population were below the poverty line, including 6.1% of those under age 18 and 2.6% of those age 65 or over.

== Culture ==
=== Fiesta Days ===
McHenry is home to Fiesta Days, an eleven day festival held in Mid-July that includes music, parade, carnival, food, car shows, art fair, and more.

=== McHenry Music Fest ===
McHenry also hosts a 3 day music festival in September each year, raising money for community projects.

=== Shamrocks the Fox ===
McHenry hosts a 3-day festival in and around Miller Point and the Downtown Business Districts around St. Patrick's Day each year. The festival began in 2018 and involves the dyeing of the Fox River green, similar to the tradition the City of Chicago does to the Chicago River. The festival includes live music, family events, a 5K race, and has an average of three to five thousand attendees each year.

=== Historic Places on the National Register ===
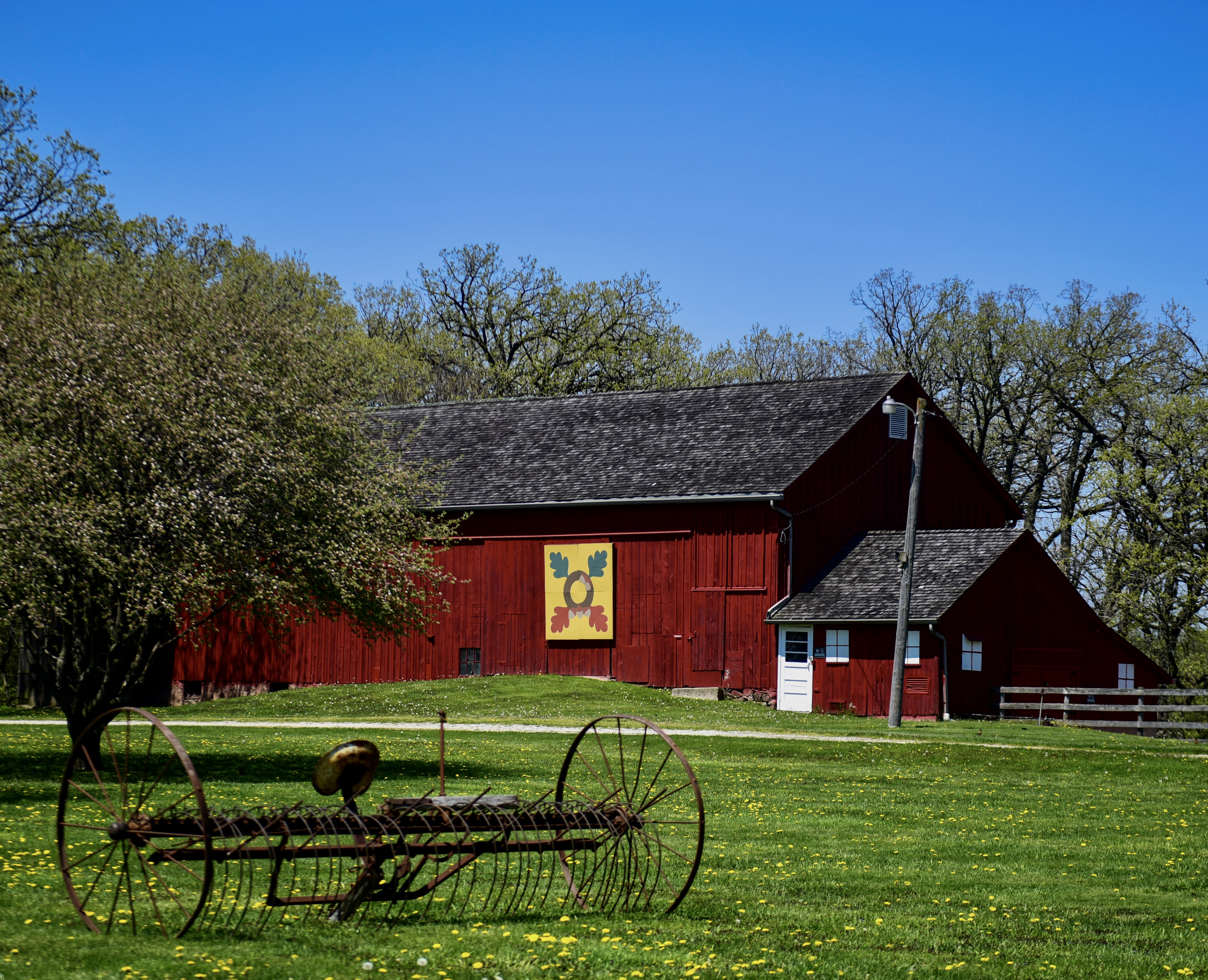
Petersen Farm

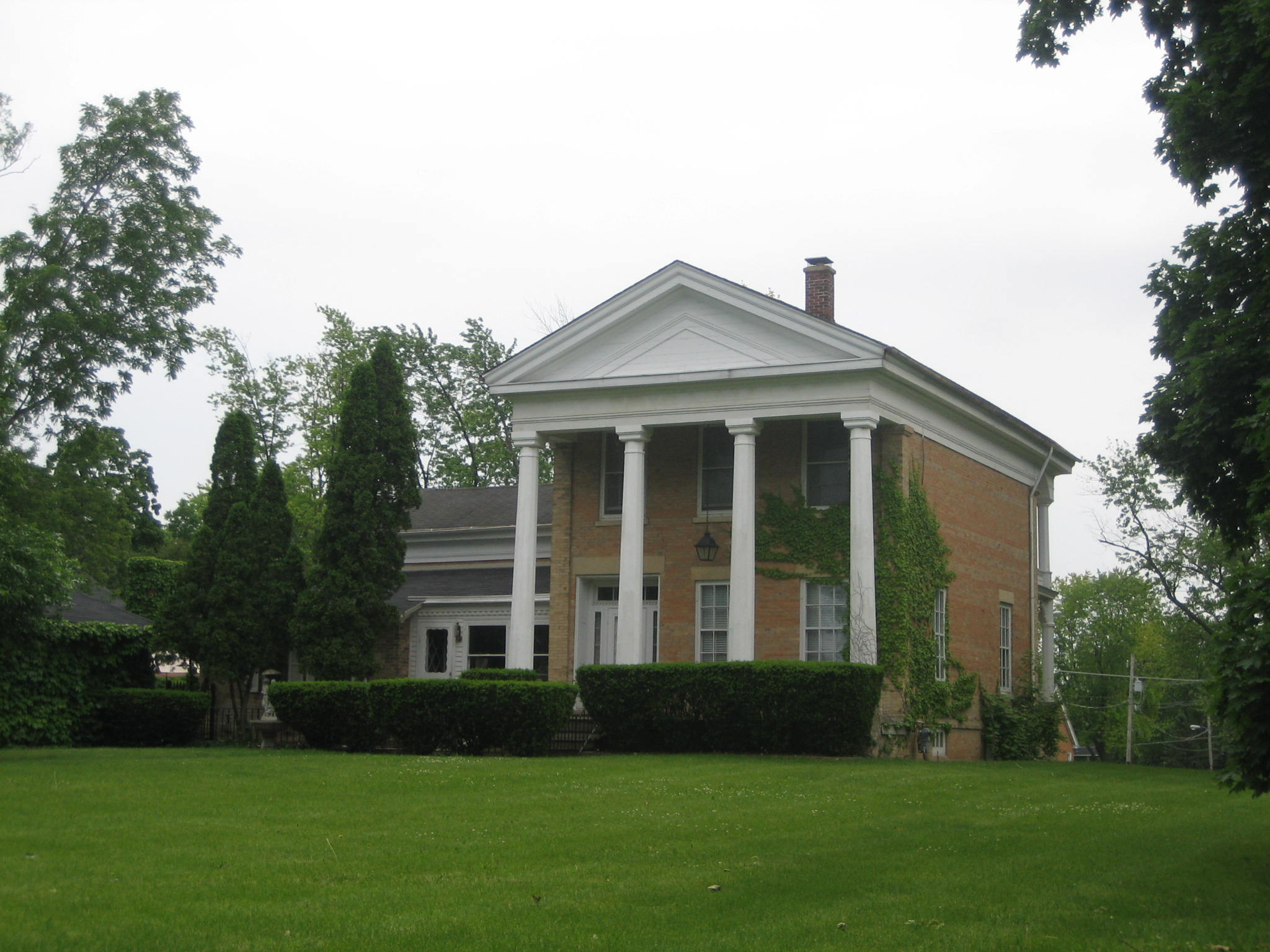
The Count's House

== Recreation ==
McHenry is home to Moraine Hills State Park which has many miles of hiking trails and connects to the Stratton Lock and Dam. Fishing from the dam is allowed only with a valid fishing license.

In addition to several dozen city parks, the Prairie Trail — a sub-section of the larger Grand Illinois Trail — runs through the middle of the city.

The live entertainment venue on Green Street was once was an indoor movie theater. The movie theater operated as 'The McHenry Theatre' from 1955 to 2014. It reopened from January 18, 2018 - January 2022 as the McHenry Downtown Theater with 3 screens, before closing permanently and converting to a live entertainment venue.

A drive-in movie theater east of town is open from March to December playing a combination of new release and classic movies. It opened July 20, 1951 as the Skyline Theater. In 2013 it won Honda's Project Drive-In contest and was upgraded with a digital projector. It continues to operate today as the McHenry Outdoor Theater.

== Economy ==
McHenry has 3 distinct downtown districts with many local shops and restaurants: Green Street, Riverside Drive, and Main Street. The McHenry Area Chamber of Commerce also owns and operates the McHenry RiverWalk Shoppes, a retail incubator with 10 small shops in Miller Point Park, available for local businesses to rent seasonally.

Connecting the Green Street and Riverside Drive downtown districts is the 0.73 mile (1.17 km) McHenry Riverwalk. which runs along Boone Creek and the Fox River. It is home to residences, shops, restaurants, bars, a concert venue, Miller Point Park, Weber's Park, and other various forms of entertainment and commerce.

Major industrial employers including Medela, Follett School Solutions, Fabrik Industries, Brake Parts Inc, Jessup Manufacturing Company, and Plaspros Inc. These businesses are located in the city's business parks.

Northwestern Medicine McHenry Hospital provides 143 beds for emergency and in and out-patient health care services to the city and surrounding areas.

North of Illinois Route 120 on Illinois Route 31 is a big box retail corridor.

== Government ==
The city of McHenry lies within two townships: McHenry Township and Nunda Township. The majority of the city falls within the former.

=== Mayor ===
See the full article, List of mayors of McHenry, Illinois.

- Wayne Jett

=== City Council ===
The city council consists of representatives from the 7 city wards:

- Ward 1 - Bobbi Baehne
- Ward 2 - Andrew Glab
- Ward 3 - Stephen Doherty
- Ward 4 - Chris Bassi
- Ward 5 - Any Davis
- Ward 6 - Michael Koch
- Ward 7 - Sue Miller

== Education ==
=== Schools and libraries ===
There are two school districts serving the city of McHenry: McHenry Community High School District 156 and McHenry School District 15. District 156 is composed of two high schools while District 15 is composed of five elementary schools and three middle schools.

McHenry is served by one public library which is part of Cooperative Computer Services (CCS) consortium. The library itself houses physical books, DVDs, magazines, and more as well as providing access to online digital content. The library also offers various training classes on various topics and has several meeting rooms available for use by request.

In 2026 Mchenry Middle School has two wrestlers who are state Champions in 2A. Brennan Caruso (70#) and Max Michalski (215#) https://www.iesa.org/activities/bwr/results_PDF.asp?Year=2026

== Transportation ==
=== Airports ===
The closest public international airports to the city of McHenry are Chicago's O'Hare International Airport and Milwaukee Mitchell International Airport in Wisconsin.

The closest privately owned airport to the city is Galt Field in Wonder Lake, with a 3000 ft by 50 ft runway. The airport is used by small general aviation aircraft.

=== Public transportation ===
McRide, a paratransit service provided by Pace Bus, and Metra are available services which offers transportation options between nearby towns in the area.

=== Bike ===
The Prairie Trail runs through the middle of McHenry from Crystal Lake and connects to trails near the border of Wisconsin.

=== Passenger rail ===
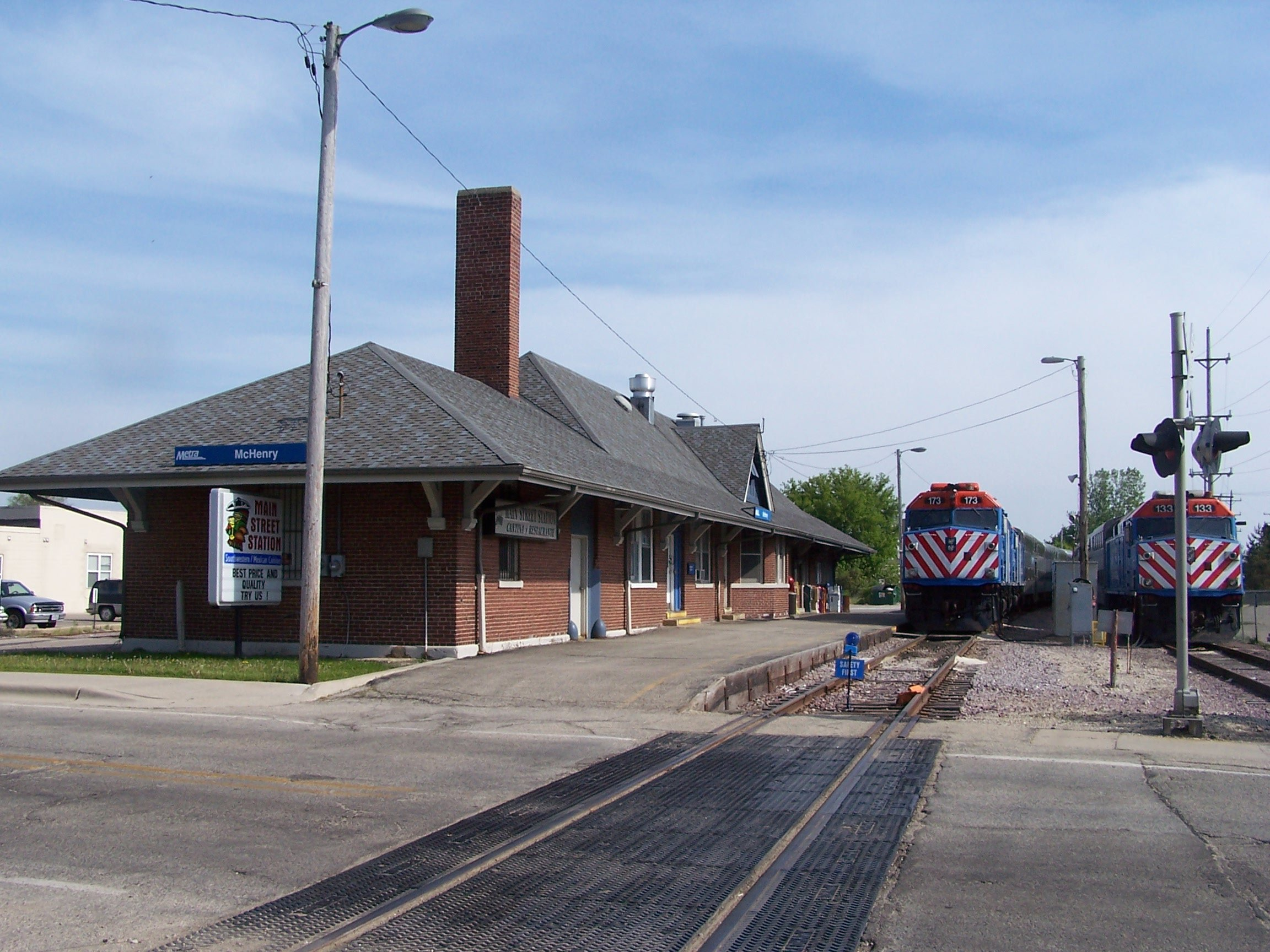
McHenry Metra Station

McHenry is currently the terminus of a branch line on Metra's Union Pacific Northwest Line, with weekday passenger service to Ogilvie Transportation Center (formerly Northwestern Station) in downtown Chicago. The line that now terminates at McHenry once continued to Williams Bay, Wisconsin, but that service was discontinued in stages in the 1960s and 1970s.

=== Road ===
Illinois Route 31 and Illinois Route 120 intersect in the city center. They are the main roads in and out of the city.

== Notable people ==
- Gary Adams (d. 2000), founded TaylorMade Golf in McHenry in 1979
- Pamela Althoff (b. 1953), Mayor of McHenry and member of the Illinois Senate from 2003 to 2018.
- Thomas A. Bolger (1887–1953), member of the Illinois House of Representatives
- John Brzenk (b. 1964), world champion arm wrestler
- Amie Cunat (b. 1986), artist specializing in painting and installation
- Jason Faunt (b. 1974), actor, grew up in McHenry
- Flavel K. Granger (1832–1905), Illinois state legislator, lawyer, and farmer
- Mariann Mayberry (b. 1965), member of Steppenwolf Theatre Company, lived in McHenry
- Jack Perconte (b. 1954), MLB Baseball Player for Dodgers, Indians, Mariners
- Lana Rhoades (b. 1996), social-media/pornography star
- Andrew Rupcich (b. 1999), football player for the Tennessee Titans
- Jace Sayler (b. 1979), football player with the New England Patriots
- Matt Skiba (b. 1976), Grammy-nominated musician and songwriter known for his work with the bands Alkaline Trio and Blink-182.
- Robert Tonyan (b. 1994), football player for the Minnesota Vikings
- Joe Walsh (b. 1961), radio personality and former congressman
- Craig Wilcox (b. 1967), member of the Illinois Senate since 2018.

== See also ==
- Two Eyed Jack, born in McHenry; Quarter Horse stallion and showhorse; the leading all time sire of American Quarter Horse Association (AQHA) champions
