= Lakemoor, Illinois =

- Village
- Flag Logo

- Location of Lakemoor in Lake County, Illinois.
- Coordinates: 42°20′23″N 88°12′14″W
- Country: United States
- State: Illinois
- Counties: Lake, McHenry

Area
  - Total: 5.54 sq mi (14.36 km^{2})
  - Land: 5.30 sq mi (13.73 km^{2})
  - Water: 0.25 sq mi (0.64 km^{2})
- Elevation: 745 ft (227 m)

Population (2020)
  - Total: 6,182
  - Density: 1,166.3/sq mi (450.32/km^{2})
- Time zone: UTC-6 (CST)
  - Summer (DST): UTC-5 (CDT)
- ZIP code: 60051
- Area code: 815
- FIPS code: 17-41326
- GNIS feature ID: 2398387
- Website: www.lakemoor.net

Lakemoor is a village in Lake and McHenry counties in the U.S. state of Illinois. Per the 2020 census, the population was 6,182.

== Geography ==
According to the 2021 census gazetteer files, Lakemoor has a total area of 5.55 square miles (14.37 km^{2}), of which 5.30 square miles (13.73 km^{2}) (or 95.58%) is land and 0.25 square miles (0.65 km^{2}) (or 4.42%) is water.

=== Major streets ===
- Rand Road/Belvidere Road
- Bay Road
- Chapel Hill Road
- Lincoln Road
- Cuhlman Road
- Lily Lake Road
- Darrell Road
- Sullivan Lake Road
- Fox Lake Road
- Volo Village Road
- Gilmer Road

== Demographics ==
Historical population
Census	Pop.	Note	%±
1960	736		—
1970	797		8.3%
1980	723		−9.3%
1990	1,322		82.8%
2000	2,788		110.9%
2010	6,017		115.8%
2020	6,182		2.7%
U.S. Decennial Census; 2010 2020

=== Racial and ethnic composition ===
Lakemoor village, Illinois – Racial and ethnic composition Note: the US Census treats Hispanic/Latino as an ethnic category. This table excludes Latinos from the racial categories and assigns them to a separate category. Hispanics/Latinos may be of any race.
Race / Ethnicity (NH = Non-Hispanic)	Pop 2000	Pop 2010	Pop 2020	% 2000	% 2010	% 2020
White alone (NH)	2,479	4,832	4,568	88.92%	80.31%	73.89%
Black or African American alone (NH)	18	118	149	0.65%	1.96%	2.41%
Native American or Alaska Native alone (NH)	2	8	6	0.07%	0.13%	0.10%
Asian alone (NH)	51	199	166	1.83%	3.31%	2.69%
Native Hawaiian or Pacific Islander alone (NH)	0	1	0	0.00%	0.02%	0.00%
Other race alone (NH)	4	1	20	0.14%	0.02%	0.32%
Mixed race or Multiracial (NH)	38	68	241	1.36%	1.13%	3.90%
Hispanic or Latino (any race)	196	790	1,032	7.03%	13.13%	16.69%
Total	2,788	6,017	6,182	100.00%	100.00%	100.00%

=== 2020 census ===
As of the 2020 census, Lakemoor had a population of 6,182. The median age was 36.4 years. 22.6% of residents were under the age of 18 and 9.5% were 65 years of age or older. For every 100 females, there were 99.4 males, and for every 100 females age 18 and over, there were 96.7 males age 18 and over.

97.1% of residents lived in urban areas, while 2.9% lived in rural areas.

There were 2,446 households, of which 33.6% had children under the age of 18 living in them. Of all households, 47.5% were married-couple households, 19.0% were households with a male householder and no spouse or partner present, and 22.9% were households with a female householder and no spouse or partner present. About 24.8% of all households were made up of individuals and 6.3% had someone living alone who was 65 years of age or older.

There were 2,633 housing units, of which 7.1% were vacant. The homeowner vacancy rate was 2.2% and the rental vacancy rate was 2.9%.

=== Income and poverty ===
The median income for a household in the village was $80,966, and the median income for a family was $108,966. Males had a median income of $64,750 versus $34,878 for females. The per capita income for the village was $36,968. About 1.1% of families and 5.3% of the population were below the poverty line, including 3.0% of those under age 18 and 5.3% of those age 65 or over.

== Recreation ==
Lakemoor borders Lily Lake, a glacial lake of approximately 89 acres (360,000 m^{2}). A village park, (named Morrison Park) has a playground, basketball and volleyball courts, and a beach occupy its eastern shores, while a boat launch provides water access from IL-Rte 120. Boat motors are limited to under 10 horsepower, but a small electrical motor provides enough power for access anywhere on the lake. The lake is populated by largemouth bass (catch and release only), bluegill, crappie, carp, and perch.

The Fox River flows through the area, providing ample opportunity for summer and winter water sports.

Four state parks and six county conservation areas are nearby, including Moraine Hills State Park and the Volo Bog State Natural Area.

== Schools ==
Lakemoor falls within the boundaries of several school districts, including McHenry Elementary School District #15, Big Hollow Elementary School District #38, Wauconda Unit School District #118, Grant High School District #124, and McHenry Community High School District #156. There are private religious schools in Wauconda and in Grant Township.

== Government services ==
Lakemoor's Police Department consists of six sworn officers. Fire protection is provided by the Fox Lake Fire Department and the McHenry and Wauconda Township Fire Protection Districts.

Lakemoor's primary source of revenue is from three cameras at the busy intersection of IL Route 120 and US Route 12, which have generated $19.2 million since 2012.

== Transportation ==
U.S. Route 12 and Illinois Route 120 traverse the village.

- Distance to the Chicago Loop: 48 miles (77 km)
- Distance to O'Hare Airport: 38 miles (61 km)
- Distance to Mitchell Field: 53 miles (85 km)
- Distance to Downtown Milwaukee: 60 miles (97 km)
