= Craig Wilcox =

American politician

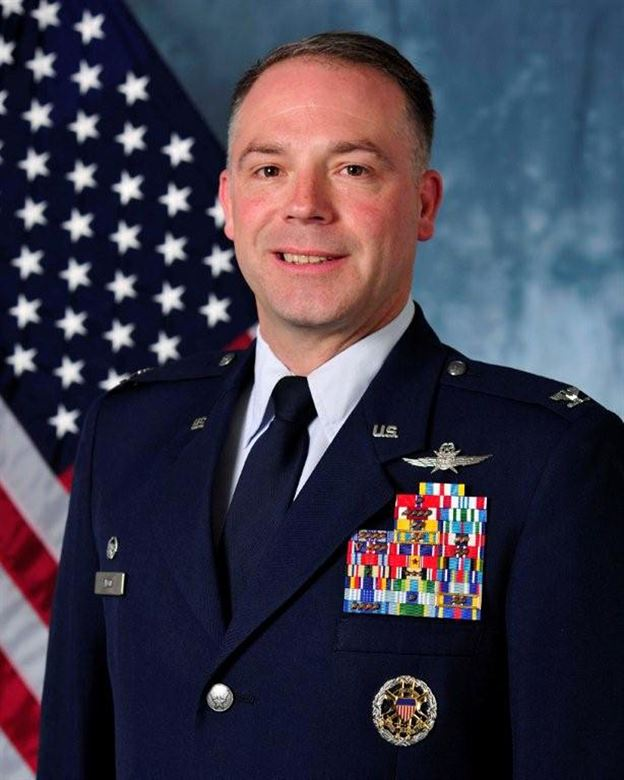
- Col. Wilcox as 89th Airlift Support Group commander (2011)

Member of the Illinois Senate from the 32nd district
- Incumbent
- Assumed office October 1, 2018
- Preceded by: Pamela Althoff
- Succeeded by: Karen Battaglia (elect)

Personal details
- Born: 1967 or 1968 (age 58–59) El Paso, Texas, U.S.
- Party: Republican
- Spouse: Janice
- Children: 3
- Education: Rensselaer Polytechnic Institute
- Website: https://senatorwilcox.com

Military service
- Allegiance: United States
- Branch/service: United States Air Force
- Years of service: 1989–2013
- Rank: Colonel

Craig Wilcox is a Republican Illinois State Senator for the 32nd District. The district includes all or parts of Antioch, Bull Valley, Crystal Lake, Fox Lake, Greenwood, Harvard, Johnsburg, Lake Villa, Lakemoor, Marengo, McHenry, Spring Grove, Volo, Wonder Lake, and Woodstock.

== Early life ==
Wilcox was born in El Paso, Texas and raised in Essex Junction, Vermont.

== Military career ==
Wilcox attended Rensselaer Polytechnic Institute on an Air Force scholarship and graduated with a degree in electrical engineering in 1989. He then entered active duty as a Communications Officer and was selected to command on three separate occasions.

During his career, he served as Commander of the 89th Airlift Support Group at Joint Base Andrews. There, he led his unit providing global command and control communications and aerial port services to the President of the United States and Air Force One. His first command was the 52nd Combat Communications Squadron, shortly after the September 11 attacks, where he helped establish new airbases in Kyrgyzstan. His second deployment was in March 2003 in southern Iraq, where his unit established the first United States Airbase in enemy territory in over 50 years. Colonel Wilcox returned to Iraq for his final deployment during the height of the insurgency and commanded for a year from 2006 to 2007 at Balad Air Base. Colonel Wilcox earned two Bronze Star Medals during these combat tours.

== Illinois Senate ==
Wilcox moved to McHenry, Illinois following his retirement from the U.S. Air Force in 2013. In 2016, he was elected to the McHenry County Board to represent District 4. In 2017, incumbent Republican Senator Pamela Althoff announced her intention to run for McHenry County Board instead of seeking reelection to the Illinois Senate. Craig Wilcox and John Reinert, a fellow Republican member of the McHenry County Board, filed to run for the Republican nomination, but Reinert withdrew before the primary. Wilcox then faced Democratic nominee and McHenry Township Assessor Mary Mahady. During the general election, Wilcox was appointed to the Illinois Senate to succeed Althoff, who stepped down early. Wilcox defeated Mahady in the general election.

=== Committee assignments ===
Craig Wilcox currently serves on the following committees: Appropriations; Education; Labor (Minority Spokesperson); Local Government; Transportation; Veterans Affairs (Minority Spokesperson).

== Electoral history ==
2022 General Election for Illinois State Senate District 32
Party	Candidate	Votes	%
Republican	Craig Wilcox	45,583	55.9
Democratic	Allena Barbato	36,009	44.1
Total votes		81,592	100.0

2018 General Election for Illinois State Senate District 32
Party	Candidate	Votes	%
Republican	Craig Wilcox	43,402	54.7
Democratic	Mary Mahady	35,936	45.3
Total votes		79,338	100.0
