= Pamela Althoff =

American politician (born 1953)

Member of the Illinois Senate from the 32nd district
- In office March 7, 2003 – September 30, 2018
- Preceded by: Richard O. Klemm
- Succeeded by: Craig Wilcox

Illinois Senate Republican Caucus Chair
- In office 2013–2018
- Preceded by: Matt Murphy

Personal details
- Born: November 22, 1953 (age 72) McHenry, Illinois, U.S.
- Party: Republican
- Education: Illinois State University; Northeastern Illinois University

Pamela J. Althoff (born November 22, 1953) is a Republican politician from Illinois. She has held several elected positions, including serving in the Illinois Senate, representing the 32nd District from her appointment in March 2003 through September 2018.

== Early life, education and career ==
Althoff was born in Chicago. She earned a bachelor's degree in education at Illinois State University in 1975 and a master's degree in education at Northeastern Illinois University in 1978. She was the city clerk of the City of McHenry, Illinois from 1994 to 2001 and was the mayor of McHenry from 2001 to 2003.

== Illinois Senate ==
Richard O. Klemm resigned from the Illinois Senate effective February 9, 2003. The Republican Legislative Committee of the 32nd Legislative District appointed Althoff to fill the vacancy for the remainder of the 93rd General Assembly. She was sworn into office on March 7, 2003. Althoff was elected to the position in the 2004 general election.

Althoff served on the Committees on Appropriations II, (minority spokesperson); Local Government, Appropriations I; Transportation; Domestic Violence Task Force; Local Government Task Force; Violent Crime Advisory Commission as well as deficit reduction, Labor, and Higher Education committees.

In 2017, she announced she would not run again for re-election in 2018. She resigned early from the Illinois Senate on September 30, 2018, and was replaced by the Republican nominee for the seat, Craig Wilcox.

== Later career ==
In 2017, Althoff announced she would run for the McHenry County Board. After her retirement from the Senate, she registered as a lobbyist. As of 2022, Althoff is the executive director of the Cannabis Business Association of Illinois, a trade association for the legal cannabis industry in Illinois.
