= Thomas A. Bolger =

American politician

Thomas A. Bolger (April 1, 1887 – April 16, 1953) was an American politician.

Bolger was born on a farm in Nunda Township, McHenry County, Illinois. He lived in McHenry, Illinois. Bolger served on the McHenry Community High School Board of Education and served as president of the board of education. Bolger also served on the McHenry County Board of Review. A member of the Democratic Party, he served in the Illinois House of Representatives from 1931 to 1951. He died at a rest home at Pistakee Bay.

In 1938–1939, the Bolger family donated land to build the Stratton Lock and Dam, which the Illinois General Assembly later renamed the William G. Stratton - Thomas A. Bolger Lock and Dam. Bolger also had a major role in establishing McHenry Community High School District 156.
