= List of mayors of McHenry, Illinois =

The following is a list of mayors of McHenry, Illinois.

Name	Start of term	End of term	Notes
Rollo Guy Chamberlain	1917	?	Officially, mayor of West McHenry.
Donald P. Doherty	1961	1973	
Joseph Stanek	1973	1985	
William Busse	1985	1993	
Steve Cuda	1993	2001	
Pamela Althoff	2001	2003	
Susan E. Low	2003	2017	
Wayne Jett	2017	Present	
