= Col. Gustavus A. Palmer House =

Historic house in Illinois, United States

- U.S. National Register of Historic Places
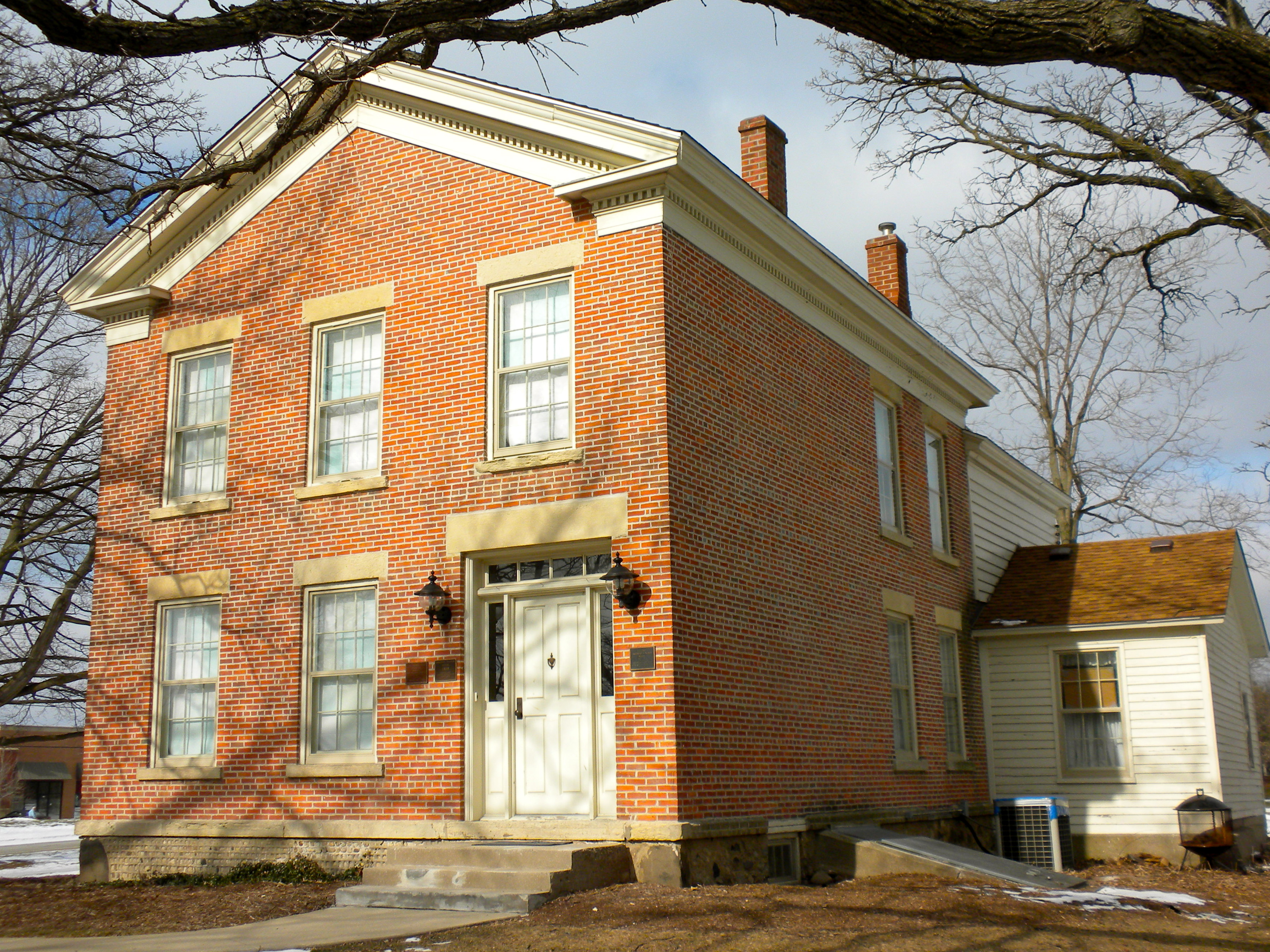

- Location within Illinois Location within the United States
- Location: 5516 Terra Cotta Rd., Crystal Lake, Illinois
- Coordinates: 42°14′56″N 88°17′46″W
- Area: 1.2 acres (0.49 ha)
- Built: 1858
- Built by: Andrew Jackson Simon
- Architectural style: Classical Revival, Greek Revival, Federal Style
- NRHP reference No.: 85001127
- Added to NRHP: May 24, 1985

The Col. Gustavus A. Palmer House is a historic residence in Crystal Lake, Illinois.

== History ==
Gustavus A. Palmer was born in Nunda, New York in 1805. He was commissioned a colonel in the 205th New York Infantry for the Patriot War. In exchange for his service, the US government granted Palmer 80 acres (32 ha) of land in McHenry County McHenry County, Illinois in 1845. Palmer purchased surrounding lands, bringing his total claim to 300 acres (120 ha). Because of his large claim, the area became known as Palmer's Corners. The ensuing county subdivision of Nunda Township was named after his hometown. Palmer was elected Judge of Elections for the township on June 5, 1850. He incorporated his holdings with the nearby Village of Crystal Lake to form the City of Crystal Lake. Palmer co-founded the Nunda Masonic Lodge on October 2, 1855. His house was built in 1858, designed by local architect Andrew Jackson Simon. When the lodge was destroyed in a fire in 1868, his house was used as a temporary lodge. Palmer's son John H. Palmer would become a major figure in the lodge, serving six stints as the lodge Master. Col. Palmer died of typhoid fever on December 19, 1884; his wife Henrietta had died from the same cause three days earlier.

The building is now the home and museum of the Crystal Lake Historical Society.

== Architecture ==
The Col. Gustavus A. Palmer House was built c. 1858 by local stonemason and architect Andrew Jackson Simon. Like Palmer, Simon had come to McHenry County from New York. The house is an eclectic blend of popular styles, dominated by Neoclassicism. The house is built with brick with a two-story front section and a one-and-a-half-story rear. Typical of the Federal Style, the house features broken pediment and a low-pitch gable. The gable features a dentilated cornice. Also typical of the style, the house features an off-center main entrance and large windows. Greek Revival influences are found in the heavy sills and limestone lintels surrounding doors, windows, and the water table. The foundation is a typical New England cobblestone masonry. The west elevation has an open air porch. The house has thirty windows—five on the south, ten on the west, one on the north, four on the east, and ten basement windows. The interior features plaster walls and southern yellow pine floors. There are no fireplaces. The first floor interior is a standardize style known as a sidehall. The floor is split into two large rooms that each feature a smaller room. The south side was the main entrance and featured the staircase. The rear featured access to the attic and basement. The second floor is not standardized, featuring five rooms and a closet.

== See also ==
- National Register of Historic Places listings in McHenry County, Illinois
- Museum
