= Prairie Trail =

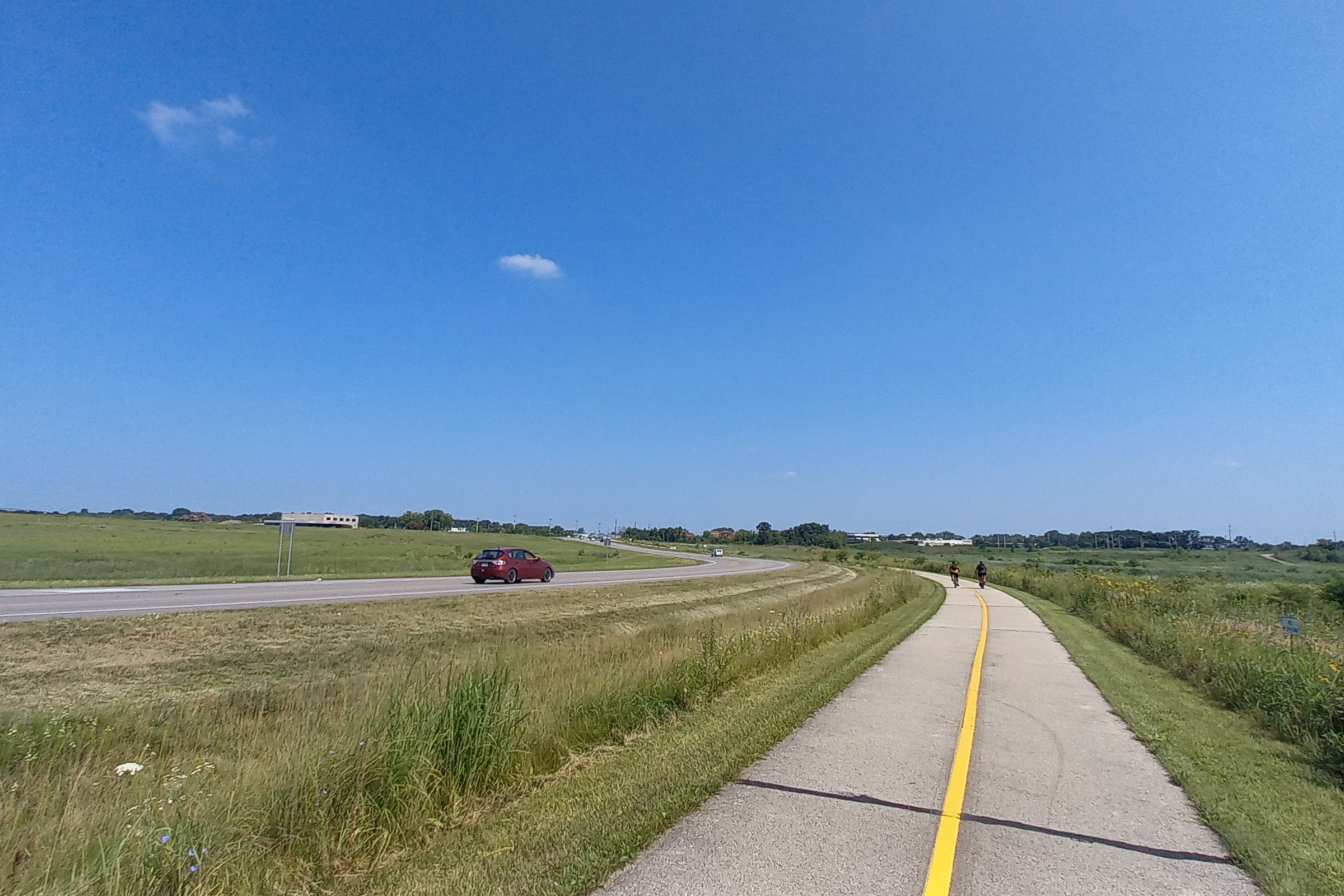
- Prairie Trail and Pyott Road in Crystal Lake
- Length: 26 miles (42 km)
- Location: McHenry County, Illinois, USA
- Use: Cycling and pedestrians
- Difficulty: Easy
- Season: Limited access during winter

The Prairie Trail is a 26-mile-long (42 km) shared use path for walking and cycling, located in McHenry County, Illinois. The path is part of the Grand Illinois Trail and connects McHenry County to other trails in the Chicago metropolitan area. It is considered to be a good example of converting old methods of transportation to a new one. The trail is maintained by the McHenry County Conservation District and is open from sunrise to sunset year round.

The connecting trails are:

- Hebron Trail
- Moraine Hills State Park Trails
- Glacial Park Trails
- Fox River Trail

The trail follows the old Chicago and Northwestern rail line that ran from Kane County into Wisconsin, making it a rail trail.
