= Karen Battaglia =

American politician

Member of the Illinois Senate from the 32nd district
- Member-elect
- Assumed office January 13, 2027
- Preceded by: Craig Wilcox

Personal details
- Party: Democratic
- Website: Campaign website

Karen Battaglia is an American politician. A member of the Democratic Party, she was elected to the Illinois Senate in 2026, representing the 32nd district. She unseated incumbent Republican Craig Wilcox in the 2026 election.
