= Fox River Trail (Illinois) =

Multi-use path in Illinois, United States

Coordinates: 41.97685°N 88.20511°W

Fox River Trail - Illinois
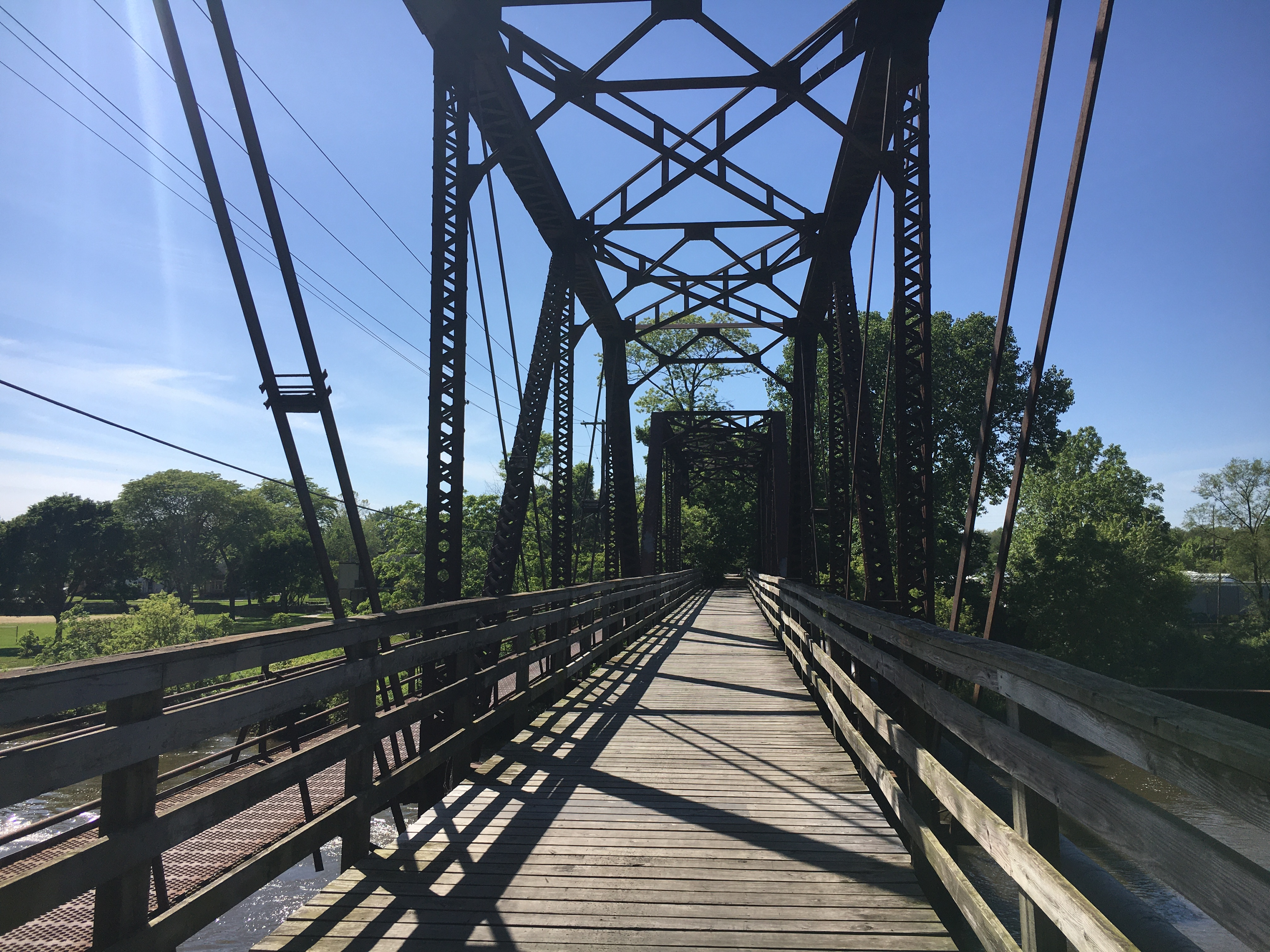
- Truss bridge over the Fox River, a part of the trail that is shared with the Virgil L. Gilman Trail
- Length: 64 kilometres (40 miles)
- Location: Illinois
- Use: Cycling and pedestrians
- Elevation gain/loss: 390 m (1,280 ft)
- Difficulty: Medium

Trail map
- Fox River Trail highlighted in red

The Fox River Trail is a multi-use path in Illinois along the Fox River. Largely in Kane County, the trail connects the communities of (North to South) Algonquin, Carpentersville, Dundee, Elgin, South Elgin, St. Charles, Geneva, Batavia, North Aurora, Aurora, Montgomery, and Oswego.

== Route ==
The trail begins at the McHenry County line in Algonquin and runs south just over 38 miles (61.2 kilometres) to Oswego in Kendall County. A 1 mile (1.6 kilometres) gap in Aurora was closed in 2016 by a new protected bike lane. From St. Charles south most of the route is next to Illinois Route 25 on the east side of the river or Route 31 on the west side. The trail crosses the river in several places and between Batavia and North Aurora the trail splits and runs parallel along both sides.

Some of the trail is dedicated-use on the former right of way of the AE&FRE interurban railroad and the CNW railroad, but some has been purpose-built along the riverbanks. Using the railroad right of ways allows long sections with little grade change and wide curves, while the purpose-built sections can be closer to the river. Dedicated-use sections are asphalt paved. Limited portions require a user to travel across intersections or directly on public streets.

== Trail connections ==
The Fox River Trail provides several direct and indirect connections to other local and regional trails, including:

- Illinois Prairie Path in four places: Elgin, Geneva, Batavia, and Aurora.
- Great Western Trail in St. Charles.
- Virgil Gilman Trail in Aurora.
- Prairie Trail in Algonquin.
- Numerous forest preserves and local trails.

The section connecting the Prairie Trail in Algonquin and the Illinois Prairie Path in Elgin is part of the Grand Illinois Trail, linking over 500 miles of trails together throughout Illinois.

== Points of interest ==
=== Fox River Trolley Museum ===
South of South Elgin, this operating museum is the only remaining section of the interurban with rail operations. The trail runs along the side until the end of the track, where the path goes onto the right of way. It then crosses the river on a bridge built on the original 1896 interurban piers.

=== Fabyan Park Forest Preserve ===
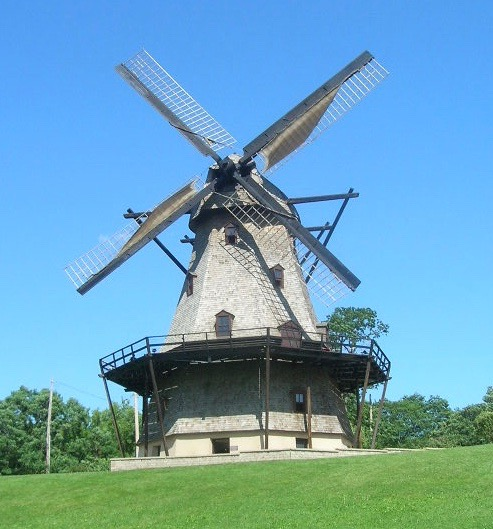
Windmill at Fabyan Park

Named after eccentric businessman Colonel George Fabyan, it is south of Geneva. On the east side, the trail passes a "Dutch" style windmill from the 1850s that was moved to the river site and refurbished in 1914. The trail can cross the river on a small island with a lighthouse built as a joke. The west side of the preserve has a Frank Lloyd Wright designed "Villa", gardens, greenhouses, pools, and other attractions.

=== Batavia Depot Museum ===
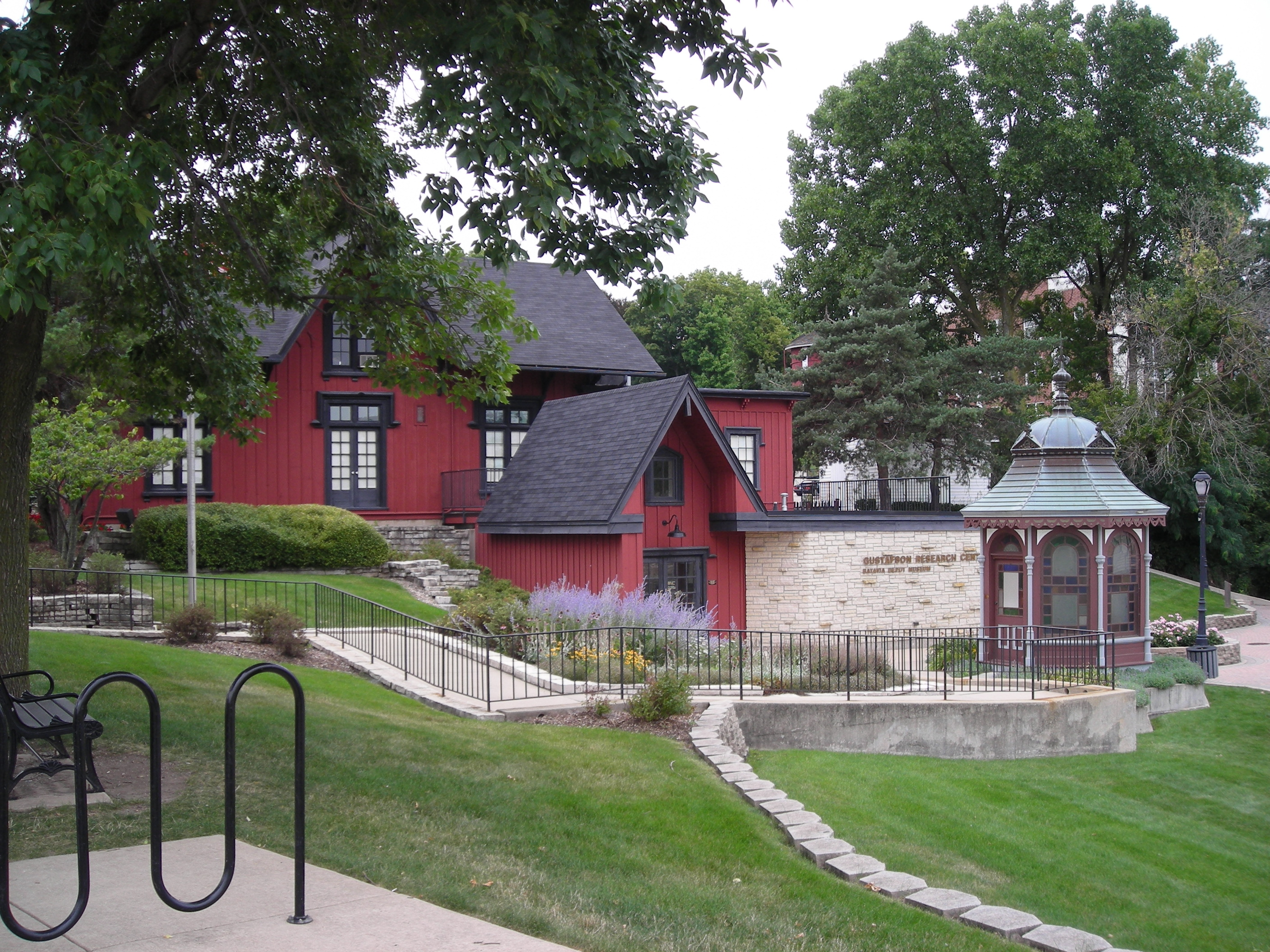
Batavia Depot Museum

In Batavia, the west side trail follows a former C.&N.W.Ry. right of way past the Depot Museum. An 1854 station from the C.B.&Q.R.R. on the east side was moved across the river to its present location in 1973, as was a caboose. Both are used as exhibits, and the museum has been expanded since.

=== C.B.&Q. roundhouse ===
In Aurora, a short distance up the connecting Illinois Prairie Path is a large railroad roundhouse. One of two built in the 1850s, it was abandoned in 1974. By 1985 one roundhouse was demolished, the remaining one was refurbished and commercially developed.

=== Valley Model Railroad Club ===
In South Elgin at Kenyon Rd. The Valley Model Railroad Club moved into the old Chicago Aurora and Elgin Railway Clintonville Station in 1953 and has been there since. Clintonville Substation was built in 1902 and put into service as a power distribution center to convert AC power to 600-volt DC needed to operate the trains which received this electric current via a third rail. The Valley Model Railroad Club is a non-profit member-only association. The HO scale trains are run with a state-of-the-art signal and DCC control system developed by one of the members who is an electrical engineer. The club hosts many public events year-round. The washroom and soda vending machine are available for public use when the club is open.
