= Amie Cunat =

Japanese-American artist

- Born: Amie Cunat; 1986 (age 39–40); McHenry, Illinois
- Education: 2012 MFA Art & Planning, Cornell University, 2010 Post-Baccalaureate, Painting & Drawing, The School of the Art Institute of Chicago, 2008 BA Visual Arts, Art History, Fordham University
- Known for: Painting and Installation

Amie Cunat (born 1986 in McHenry, Illinois) is a Japanese American artist who specializes in painting and installation. Cunat is best known for her colorful installation pieces described as "totally immersive" and "ostensibly buoyant". Cunat's paintings and installations utilize biomorphic forms and vibrant hues to investigate parallels between abstraction and perception. She received her MFA from Cornell University, a Post-Baccalaureate in Painting and Drawing from The School of the Art Institute of Chicago, and her BA in Visual Arts and Art History from Fordham University. Cunat has had solo exhibitions in New York and abroad at the Victori+Mo, The Knockdown Center, Sunroom Project Space at Wave Hill, The Cooper Union, among others.

== Career ==
Cunat's work has been shown internationally as well as in a variety of venues throughout New York state, where she works as Assistant Clinical Professor in Painting and Drawing at Fordham University.

== Exhibitions ==
=== Solo exhibitions ===
- Dinner Gallery, New York, NY, Petal Signals, 2021
- Victori + Mo, Brooklyn, NY, Meetinghouse, 2018
- Knockdown Center, Queens, NY, The Clock is Taking a Nap, 2017
- Sunroom Project Space, Wave Hill, Bronx, NY, Hideout, 2016
- Outside, North Adams, MA, Moon Nets, Alphabet Letters, 2016
- Foley Gallery - Window Installation, New York, NY, Clue, Cue, 2016
- The Cooper Union, New York, NY, Octopi Kōen, 2014

=== Select two person and group exhibitions ===
- SPRING/BREAK Art Show, New York, NY, C+C: Kat Chamberlin and Amie Cunat, 2017
- Sine Gallery at tête, Berlin, Germany, Sine Gallery: Berlin, 2017
- No Place Gallery, Columbus, OH, Western Decoy, 2017
- Ventana 244, Brooklyn, NY, Oysters With Lemon, 2015
- White Box Gallery, New York, NY, Suggestions Toward Future Conversations, 2012
