= Colby-Petersen Farm =

- U.S. National Register of Historic Places
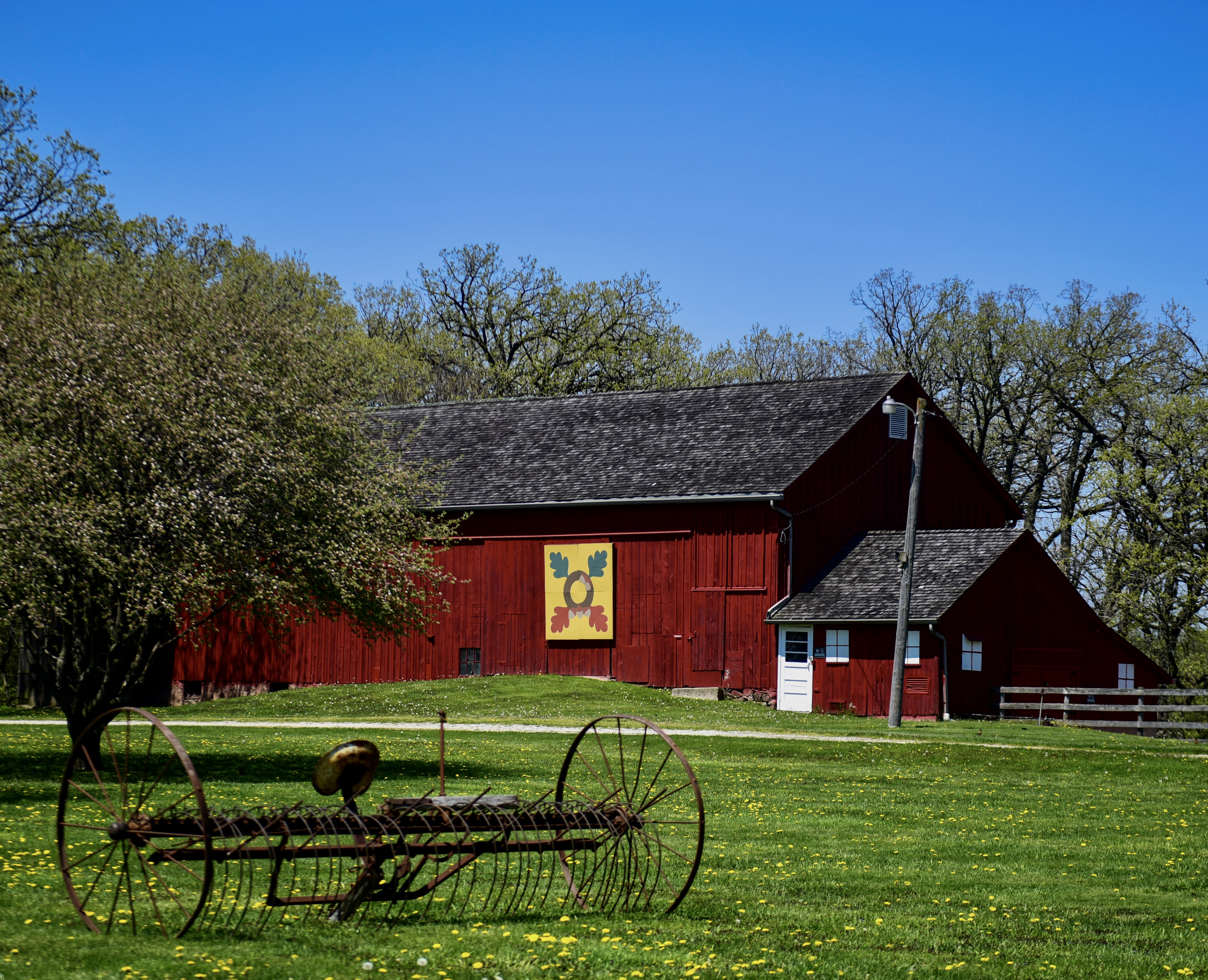

- Location within Illinois Location within the United States
- Location: 4112 McCullom Lake Rd. McHenry, Illinois
- Coordinates: 42°21′44″N 88°16′41″W
- Built: c. 1850
- NRHP reference No.: 100004853
- Added to NRHP: March 13, 2020

The Colby-Petersen Farm is a historic farm at 4112 McCullom Lake Road in McHenry, Illinois. The farm was established in the 1840s by the Colby family, who were early white settlers in McHenry County that relocated from New England. The family built a Greek Revival farmhouse on the property circa 1850; characteristic Greek Revival elements of the house include a porch supported by columns, dentillated brickwork, and a frieze band. The farm primarily produced dairy, and it was one of the many prosperous dairy farms in northern Illinois in the late nineteenth and early twentieth centuries. Danish immigrant Peter Petersen married into the Colby family in 1901, and when he inherited the farm in 1914, it became known as the Petersen Farm. In addition to the farmhouse, surviving buildings on the farm include a dairy barn, a horse barn, and a garage.

The farm was added to the National Register of Historic Places on March 13, 2020.
