= Count's House =

Historic house in Illinois, United States

- U.S. National Register of Historic Places
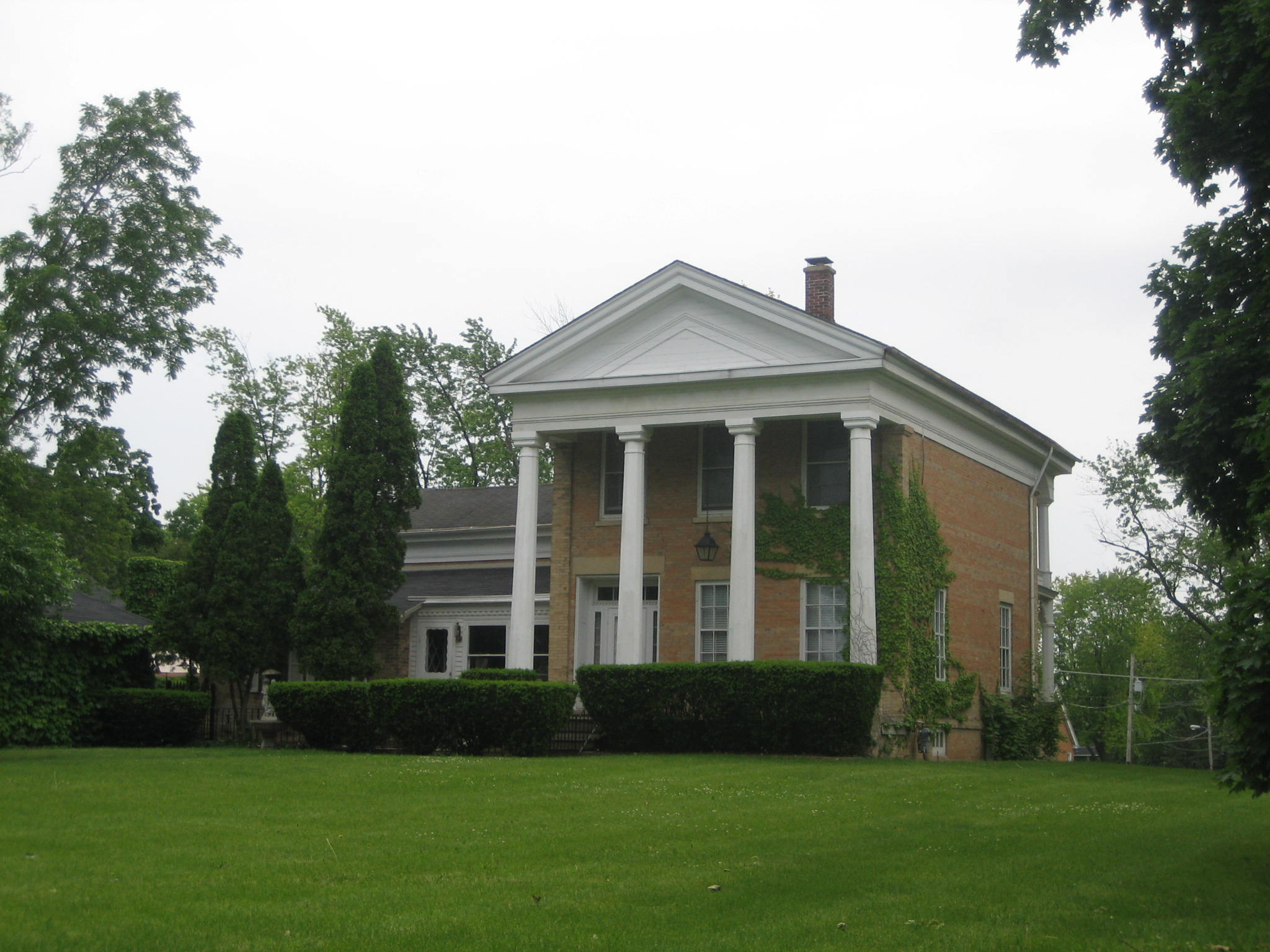
- The north facade of the Count's House.

- Location within Illinois Location within the United States
- Location: 3803 Waukegan, McHenry, Illinois
- Coordinates: 42°20′36″N 88°16′18″W
- Built: c. 1860
- Architectural style: Greek Revival
- NRHP reference No.: 82002587
- Added to NRHP: June 3, 1982

The Count's House is a historic Greek Revival home in McHenry, Illinois. It is one of McHenry's oldest and most notable landmarks, as well as one of the finest preserved examples of Greek Revival architecture in McHenry County. It is the only building in the city of McHenry listed on the National Register of Historic Places.

== History ==
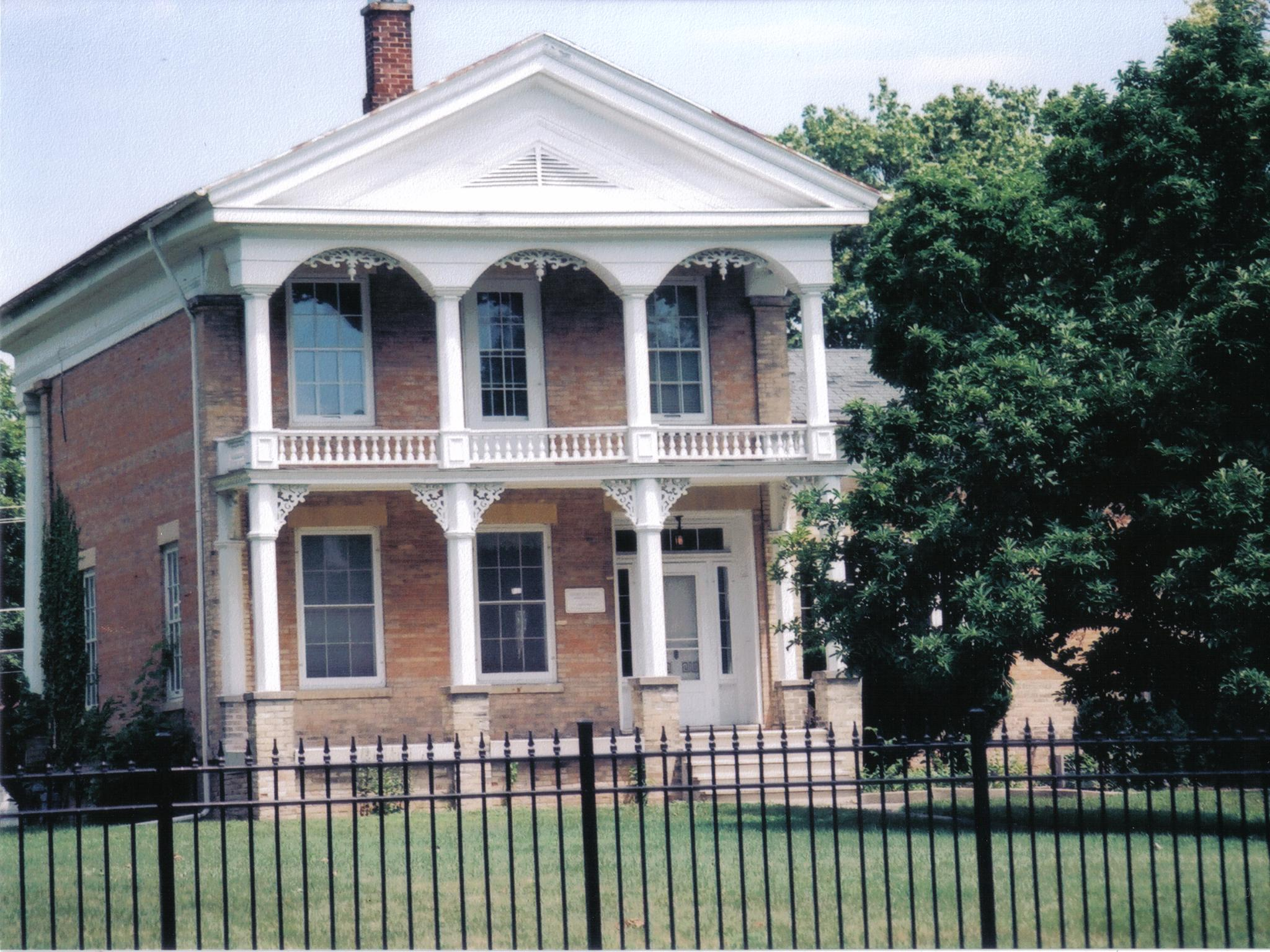
The south facade of the Count's House.

Although the exact date of construction and original owner of the Count's House are unknown, the building is believed to have been built prior to the Civil War. The plaque on the exterior denotes the house as having been completed circa 1860. The house has had a number private owners throughout its history, the most notable being Count Oskar Bopp von Oberstadt, an Austrian count for whom the house is named. For its architectural significance, the Count's House was added to the National Register of Historic Places on June 3, 1982. A wrought iron fence was constructed around the entire perimeter of the property under new ownership in 2005.

== Architecture ==
The Count's House is particularly distinct for its two faces, a very unusual feature for a Greek Revival. The north facade, facing Waukegan Road, consists of a portico with full two-story columns of the Doric order. The south facade, facing Main Street, consists of two-story loggia with an upper balcony and several intricate mouldings. The six-over-six windows, balustrades, columns, door surrounds, and nearly all of the exterior moldings appear to be original. The house's exterior walls consist of double-wythe brick, with double-hung windows over six and a half feet in height. The only known significant modifications to the house have been additions to its wing, the replacement of the column pedestals with brick, and the replacement of the original cedar shake with asphalt shingles. Aside from these discrepancies, an old postcard published in Historic Homes of McHenry County reveals that the house remains much as it appeared in the early 1900s, if not earlier.

== Gallery ==
The north facade circa early 1900s

The south facade circa early 1900s

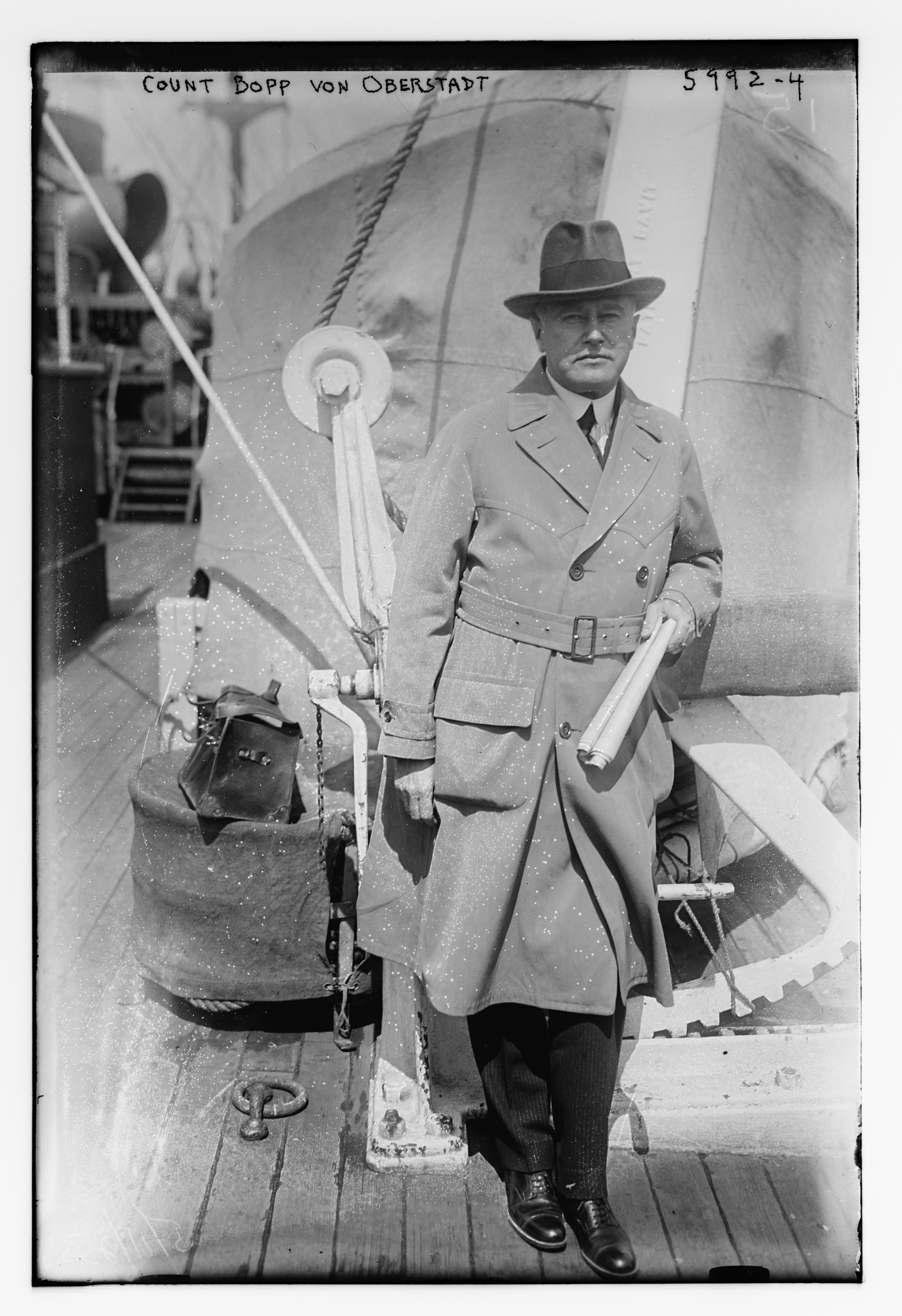
Count Bopp von Oberstadt
