= Richmond, Illinois =

- Village
- Village of Richmond
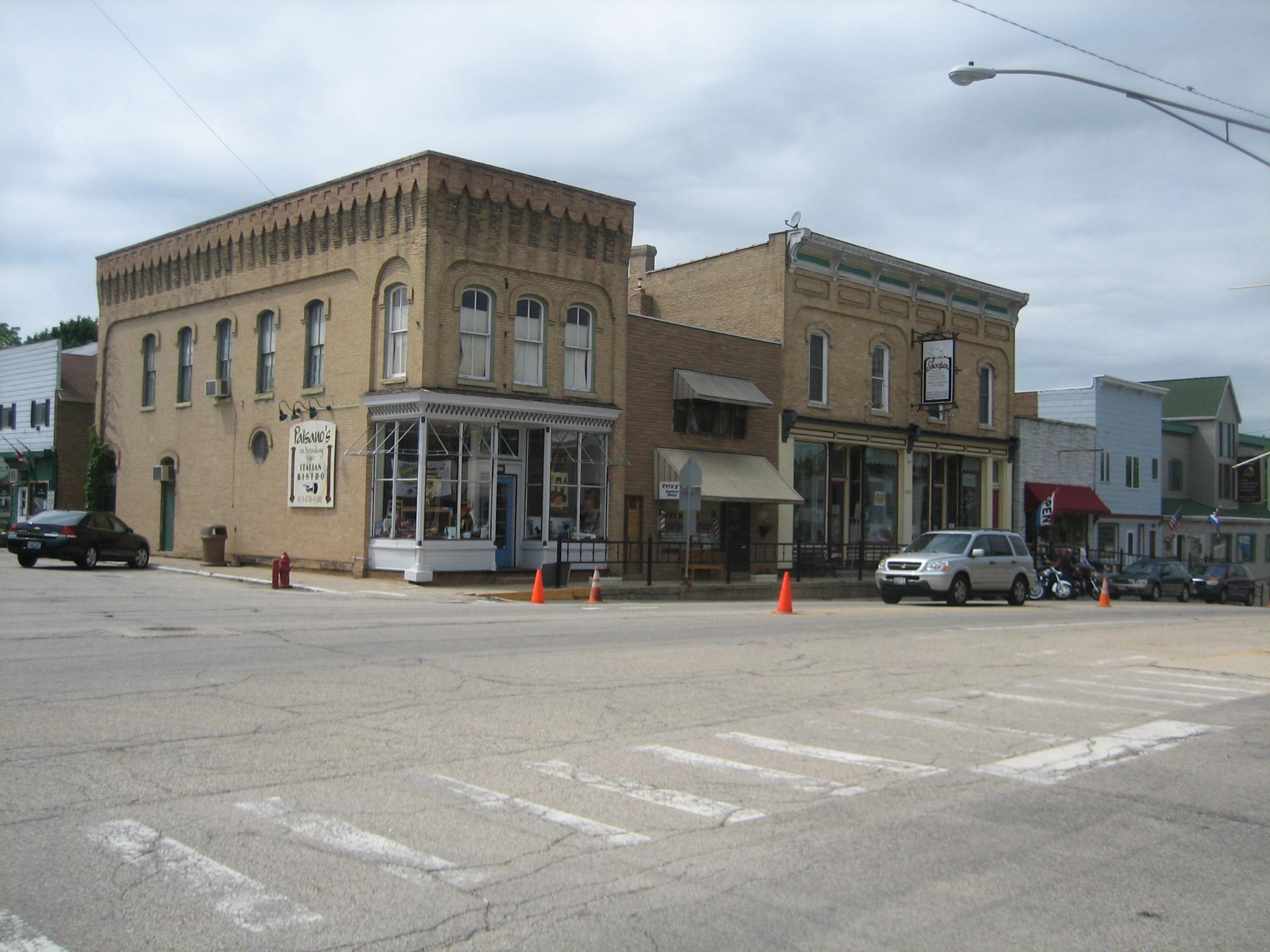
- Buildings in downtown Richmond, Illinois

- Flag Seal

- Location of Richmond in McHenry County, Illinois.
- Coordinates: 42°27′50″N 88°18′34″W
- Country: United States
- State: Illinois
- County: McHenry
- Township: Richmond
- Incorporated: 1872
- Named for: Richmond, Vermont

Area
  - Total: 4.29 sq mi (11.11 km^{2})
  - Land: 4.29 sq mi (11.11 km^{2})
  - Water: 0 sq mi (0.00 km^{2})
- Elevation: 784 ft (239 m)

Population (2020)
  - Total: 2,089
  - Density: 487.2/sq mi (188.09/km^{2})
- Time zone: UTC-6 (CST)
  - Summer (DST): UTC-5 (CDT)
- ZIP code: 60071
- Area code: 815
- FIPS code: 17-63641
- GNIS feature ID: 2399067
- Website: richmond-il.com

Richmond is a village in McHenry County, Illinois, United States, 65 miles northwest of Chicago. It is a commuter village within the Chicago metropolitan area. The population was 2,089 at the 2020 census.

== History ==
Carpenter William A. McConnell was Richmond's first settler, arriving in 1837 and erecting the village's first building, a log structure. Eight other settlers arrived in 1838 and growth progressed rapidly after that point. The first school was built on McConnell's farm in 1841 and in 1844 the village was finally platted. The village was named after Richmond, Vermont, the native home of a first settler. McConnell and Dr. R.R. Stone established a cheese factory in Richmond, and a creamery, other cheese factories, a box factory, a wagon works and a pickle factory followed.

Most of Richmond's original buildings were built from the mid-1840s through the 1860s and consisted of Greek Revival rural farmhouse and Richmond's commercial district. Houses within the village were built mostly in the Greek Revival style as well with later prominent homes cast in the Italianate or Second Empire styles. The village of Richmond was officially incorporated in 1872.

On Christmas Eve 1902 a devastating fire swept through most of Richmond's commercial district destroying 20 buildings. The fire was a setback for Richmond's economic growth as most of the buildings were either uninsured or underinsured. Many business owners did not bother to rebuild at all following the fire. Another building spurt did occur in Richmond between 1903 and 1905.

Richmond was the site for the Chicago Super and Sprint Weekend event, June 10, 2017, part of the Reebok Spartan Race.

== Geography ==
According to the 2010 census, Richmond has a total area of 4.22 square miles (10.93 km^{2}), all land.

=== Major streets ===
- Main Street
- Kenosha Street
- Mill Street
- Broadway Street
- George Street

== Demographics ==
Historical population
Census	Pop.	Note	%±
1880	464		—
1890	415		−10.6%
1900	576		38.8%
1910	554		−3.8%
1920	533		−3.8%
1930	514		−3.6%
1940	559		8.8%
1950	623		11.4%
1960	855		37.2%
1970	1,153		34.9%
1980	1,068		−7.4%
1990	1,016		−4.9%
2000	1,091		7.4%
2010	1,874		71.8%
2020	2,089		11.5%
U.S. Decennial Census

=== Racial and ethnic composition ===
Richmond village, Illinois – Racial and ethnic composition Note: the US Census treats Hispanic/Latino as an ethnic category. This table excludes Latinos from the racial categories and assigns them to a separate category. Hispanics/Latinos may be of any race.
Race / Ethnicity (NH = Non-Hispanic)	Pop 2000	Pop 2010	Pop 2020	% 2000	% 2010	% 2020
White alone (NH)	1,036	1,670	1,798	94.96%	89.11%	86.07%
Black or African American alone (NH)	1	16	29	0.09%	0.85%	1.39%
Native American or Alaska Native alone (NH)	2	6	1	0.18%	0.32%	0.05%
Asian alone (NH)	7	32	28	0.64%	1.71%	1.34%
Pacific Islander alone (NH)	0	0	0	0.00%	0.00%	0.00%
Other race alone (NH)	0	0	4	0.00%	0.00%	0.19%
Mixed race or Multiracial (NH)	1	20	72	0.09%	1.07%	3.45%
Hispanic or Latino (any race)	44	130	157	4.03%	6.94%	7.52%
Total	1,091	1,874	2,089	100.00%	100.00%	100.00%

=== 2020 census ===
As of the 2020 census, Richmond had a population of 2,089. The median age was 42.2 years. 17.2% of residents were under the age of 18 and 18.8% of residents were 65 years of age or older. For every 100 females there were 95.1 males, and for every 100 females age 18 and over there were 93.3 males age 18 and over.

67.2% of residents lived in urban areas, while 32.8% lived in rural areas.

There were 1,017 households in Richmond, of which 20.8% had children under the age of 18 living in them. Of all households, 35.9% were married-couple households, 23.8% were households with a male householder and no spouse or partner present, and 31.0% were households with a female householder and no spouse or partner present. About 40.8% of all households were made up of individuals and 13.4% had someone living alone who was 65 years of age or older.

There were 1,097 housing units, of which 7.3% were vacant. The homeowner vacancy rate was 2.4% and the rental vacancy rate was 7.6%.

=== 2010 census ===
As of the census of 2010, there were 1,901 people, 415 households, and 285 families residing in the village. The population density was 802.2 inhabitants per square mile (309.7/km^{2}). There were 441 housing units at an average density of 324.3 per square mile (125.2/km^{2}). The racial makeup of the village was 97.89% White, 0.27% African American, 0.18% Native American, 0.64% Asian, 0.92% from other races, and 0.09% from two or more races. Hispanic or Latino of any race were 4.03% of the population.

There were 415 households, out of which 35.2% had children under the age of 18 living with them, 56.4% were married couples living together, 8.9% had a female householder with no husband present, and 31.3% were non-families. 25.1% of all households were made up of individuals, and 9.4% had someone living alone who was 65 years of age or older. The average household size was 2.63 and the average family size was 3.19.

In the village, the population was spread out, with 27.3% under the age of 18, 7.3% from 18 to 24, 29.9% from 25 to 44, 22.6% from 45 to 64, and 12.8% who were 65 years of age or older. The median age was 37 years. For every 100 females, there were 99.1 males. For every 100 females age 18 and over, there were 96.3 males.

The median income for a household in the village was $52,361, and the median income for a family was $60,417. Males had a median income of $41,136 versus $27,344 for females. The per capita income for the village was $22,332. About 2.6% of families and 6.5% of the population were below the poverty line, including 4.4% of those under age 18 and 10.2% of those age 65 or over.

== See also ==
- Lucien Boneparte Covell House
- Memorial Hall
- Richmond-Burton
