= Richard O. Klemm =

American politician

Richard Oren "Dick" Klemm (May 5, 1932 – March 22, 2010) was an American businessman and politician.

Born in Chicago, Illinois, Klemm served in the United States Army from 1957 to 1962. He received his bachelor's degree in industrial economics and engineering from Purdue University. Klemm owned the Food Warming Equipment Company. He lived in Crystal Lake, Illinois. He served on the Prairie Grove School District 46 school board and was president of the school board. Klemm also served on the McHenry County, Illinois Board of Commissioners and was a Republican. From 1983 to 1993, Klemm served in the Illinois House of Representatives and then served in the Illinois Senate from 1993 until his retirement in 2003. Klemm died at Centegra Hospital in Woodstock, Illinois.
