= Memorial Hall (Richmond, Illinois) =

- U.S. National Register of Historic Places
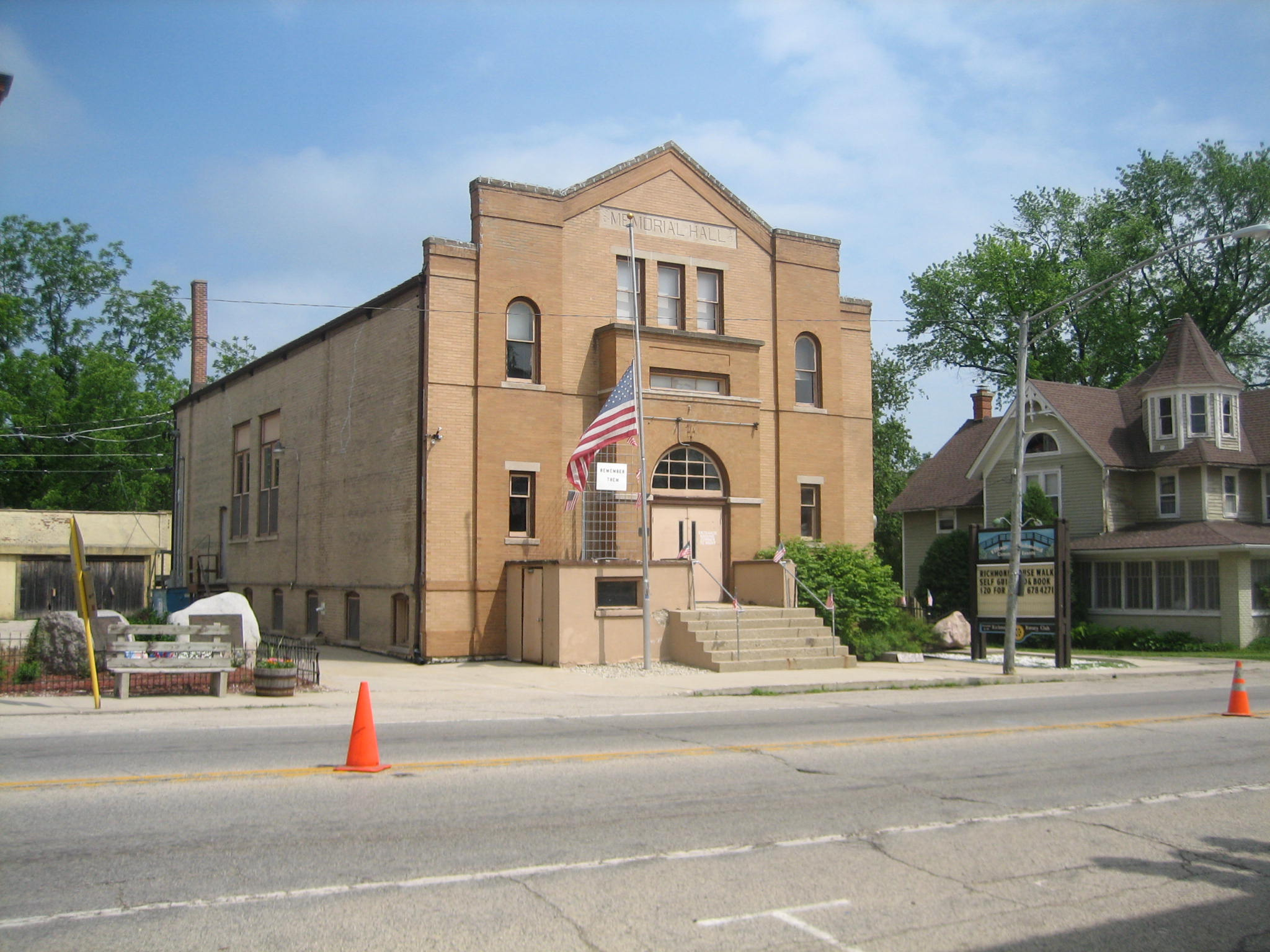

- Location within Illinois Location within the United States
- Location: 10308 Main St., Richmond, Illinois
- Coordinates: 42°28′32″N 88°18′21″W
- Area: less than one acre
- Built: 1907
- Architect: Fred Arp (builder)
- Architectural style: Late 19th And Early 20th Century American Movements
- NRHP reference No.: 93000839
- Added to NRHP: August 19, 1993

Memorial Hall in Richmond, Illinois, US is a historic public building located in the village's primary business district. It was constructed in 1907 and has served as a focal point for community government and recreation. In 1993 Richmond Memorial Hall was added to the U.S. Register of Historic Places.

== History ==
The Richmond Memorial Hall was built in 1907 with a US$ 10,000 bequest from Charles Dewitt McConnell, grandson of Richmond's first settler, William McConnell. The bequest was filed in McConnell's will on September 3, 1903 and by 1905 the village had organized a committee to begin investigating a site to build Memorial Hall. McConnell's will called for a city or village hall to be built and used for government administration and for school and church activities free of charge. In the 1930s, Memorial Hall housed the J.B. Rotnour Troupe, providing entertainment for the town, but the building has also served as the village hall, police department, community library, a school gymnasium and a home for the American Legion. The village government's offices have since moved to a different location at 5600 Hunter Drive. In April 2021 Memorial Hall was sold by the Village of Richmond to a private owner for the sum of $230,000 and the interior of the building is currently undergoing remodeling to facilitate its use for commercial purposes.

== Architecture ==
The two story building has a total perimeter of 254 feet and has a full basement. The building has an upper level auditorium, with lobby space, a closet, ticket office, stage and balcony. The ticket office remains in the front foyer, as do the two stairways leading up to the balcony. The gabled roof has asphalt shingles. The orange-yellow brick facade is in good condition but the current metal doors are not original to the building. Fred Arp was the contracted builder used by the village of Richmond in 1907.

== Historic significance ==
The building is locally significant for its association with the Richmond village government as government administrative offices. Memorial Hall has also served a long time entertainment function in Richmond, catering to a variety of groups over the years. Since its construction Memorial Hall has been a focal point and hub of the community in Richmond. On August 19, 1993 Richmond Memorial Hall was added to the U.S. National Register of Historic Places.
