= McHenry School District 15 =

Public school district in McHenry, Illinois, United States

Address
- 1011 N. Green Street McHenry, McHenry County, Illinois, 60050; United States

District information
- Type: Public School District
- Grades: K-8
- Superintendent: Josh Reitz, Ed.D.
- Schools: 8
- Budget: US$63 million (2015)
- NCES District ID: 1725290

Students and staff
- Students: 4,519 (2015–16)
- Student–teacher ratio: 15.42 (2014–15)

Other information
- Website: www.d15.org

McHenry School District 15 is a school district serving parts of McHenry County, Illinois.

== Schools ==
There are six elementary schools serving students within the district:

- Chauncey H. Duker School (4-5)
- Edgebrook Elementary School (Pre-K to 3)
- Hilltop Elementary School (K-3)
- Landmark Elementary School (K-5)
  - Opened in 1894
  - Since 2001, it has operated as a school of choice, available to all district residents. The school uses a looping classroom approach where teachers stay with the same students for 2 years and a continuous learning calendar where school starts in mid July and then follows a 9 week on, 3 week off schedule until early June, whereby they have a 6 week summer break.
- Riverwood Elementary School (K-5)
- Valley View Elementary School (K-5)

There are two middle schools:

- McHenry Middle School (6-8)
  - Opened 2001
- Parkland School (6-8)
