= Moraine Hills State Park =

State park in McHenry County, Illinois

- IUCN category III (natural monument or feature)
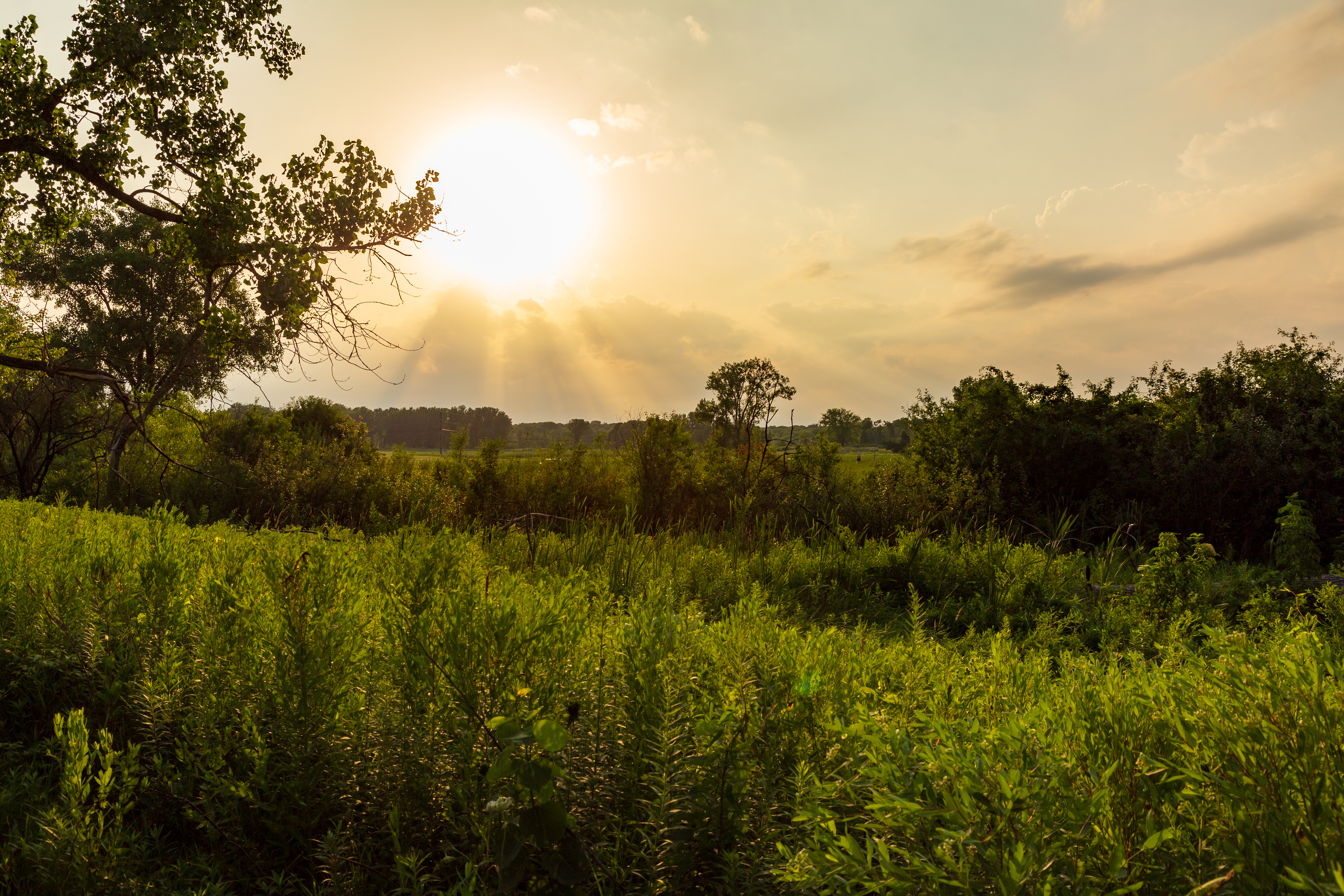
- Moraine Hills State Park, August, 2023

- Location within Illinois Location within the United States
- Location: McHenry County, Illinois, US
- Nearest city: McHenry, Illinois
- Coordinates: 42°18′37″N 88°14′57″W
- Area: 2,200 acres (890 ha)
- Established: 1939
- Governing body: Illinois Department of Natural Resources

Moraine Hills State Park is an Illinois state park on 2,200 acres (890 ha) in McHenry County, Illinois, United States.

== History ==
The McHenry dam was constructed in 1907 on the Fox River near McHenry, Illinois. The dam was donated to the state in 1924 and a new dam was built in 1934. McHenry Dam State Park was founded in 1939 with the purchase of 15 acres (6.1 ha) of land on the east bank of the river. Property on the west bank of the river was donated to the state Division of Water Resources in the early 1960s. In 1971, the state began to acquire land surrounding Lake Defiance, then constructed park facilities in 1975. Renamed Moraine Hills State Park, the park was opened to the public in October 1976.

== See also ==
- Moraine
- Illinois state parks
