= Grand Illinois Trail =

Large trail in Northern Illinois

Map of the trail, with alternate routes shown

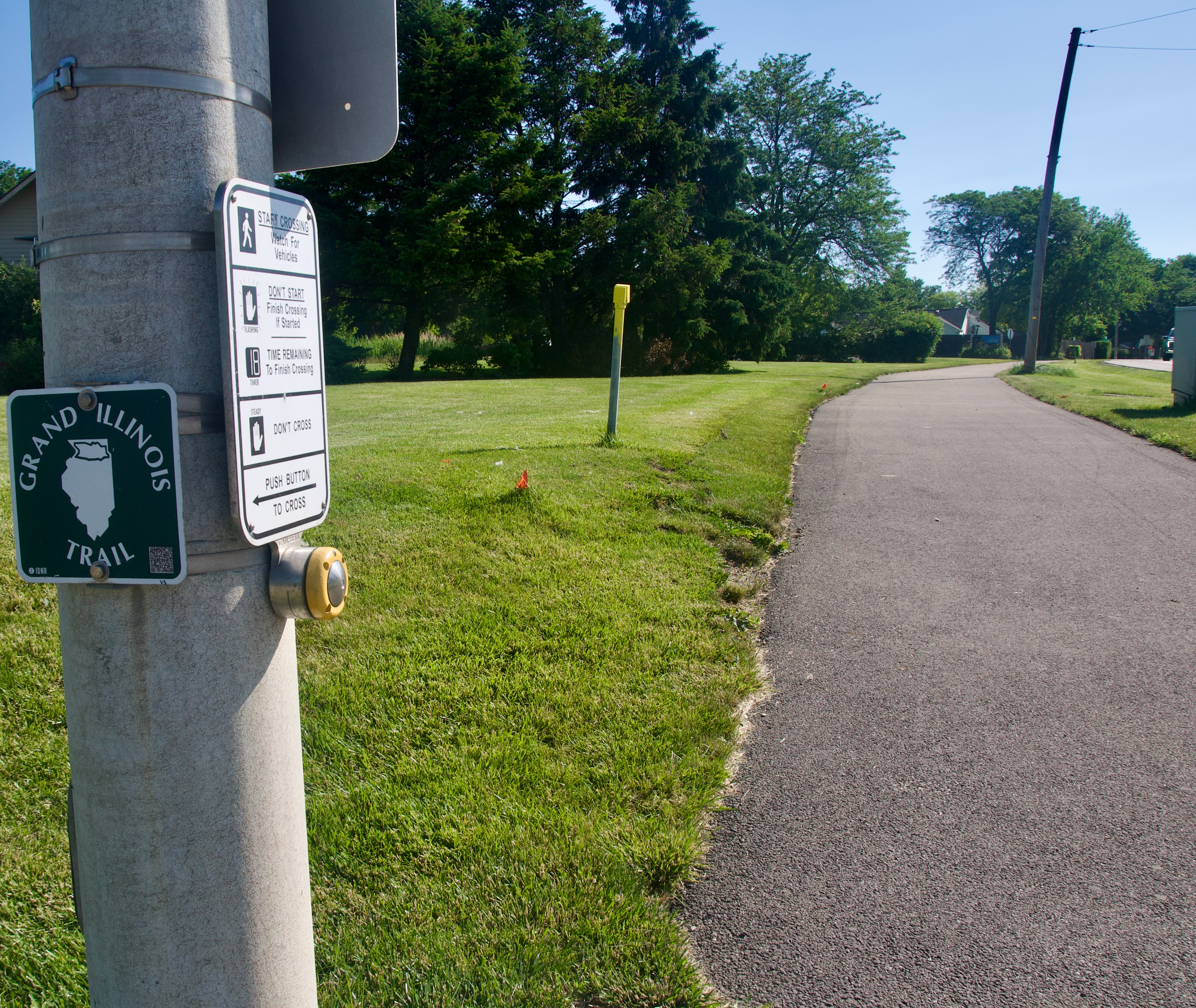
Grand Illinois Trail in Mundelein, Illinois

The Grand Illinois Trail (occasionally abbreviated GIT) is a multipurpose recreational trail in the northern part of the U.S. state of Illinois. At over 575 miles (925 km) in length, it is the longest trail in Illinois. Parts of it are in the coast-to-coast American Discovery Trail.

The Grand Illinois Trail began life in 1992 when three La Salle County residents began exploring ways to connect the existing Hennepin and Illinois & Michigan Canal state trails. By completing a short 16-mile gap, a major span across the state—from Lake Michigan to the Mississippi River—could be completed. This led to IDNR involvement and its decision to extend the trail across a much broader region of Illinois.

It contains flat and easy-to-ride portions through green farmlands and pastoral vistas, as well as the hilly geography of Jo Daviess County, Chicago streetscapes and Lake Michigan, the Mississippi river, the Upper Illinois River Valley, Small Town America and medium-sized cities and suburbs. Those who complete a trail journal and confirm completion with the IDNR are granted the title of Trailblazer.

Its trail surfaces vary from asphalt trails to low-volume streets to limestone-screened trails. particularly noteworthy is the famous Prairie Path through the western suburbs of Chicago, which was the first long rail-trail development in America, along with the great Chicago Lakefront trail. The best long-section of the GIT is the southern section along the state canal trails, between Joliet and the Quad Cities. This southern section includes the Old Plank Road Trail, the Illinois and Michigan Canal Trail, the projected Kaskaskia Alliance Trail and the Hennepin Canal, and is the northern routing of the cross-country American Discovery Trail.

== See also ==
=== Comparable trails ===
- Appalachian Trail
- Mississippi River Trail
- American Discovery Trail

=== Subsections of the Grand Illinois Trail ===
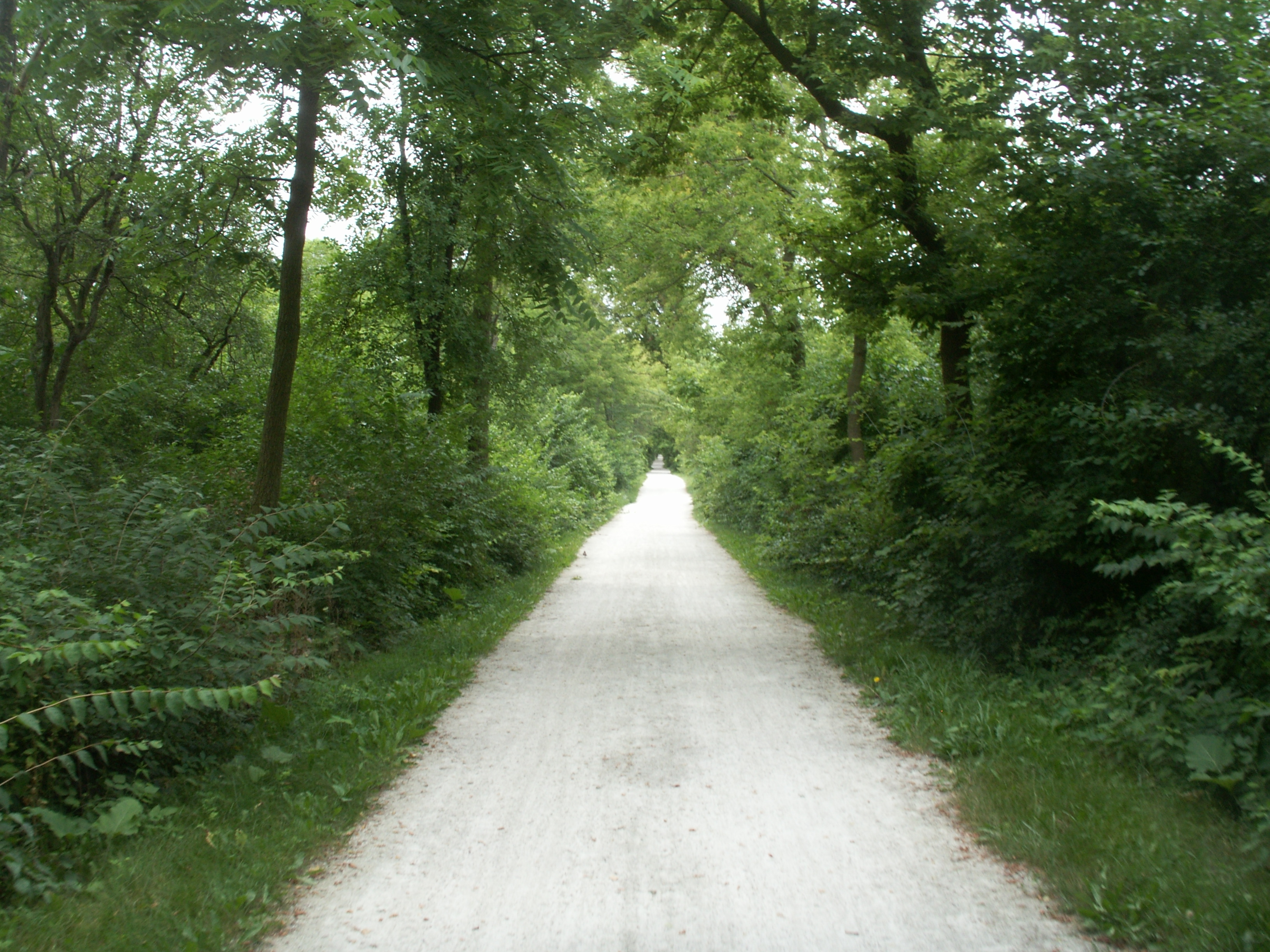
The Illinois Prairie Path in Wheaton, Illinois.

- Chicago Lakefront Path
- Burnham Greenway
- Thorn Creek Trail
- Old Plank Road Trail
- Illinois & Michigan Canal State Trail — also see Illinois and Michigan Canal
- Hennepin Canal Trail — also see Hennepin Canal
- Great River Trail
- Thomson Sand Prairie Trail
- Jane Addams Trail
- Pecatonica Prairie Path
- Rock River Recreation Path
- Bauer Parkway Trail
- Willow Creek Trail
- Long Prairie Trail
- Prairie Trail
- Fox River Trail (Illinois)
- Illinois Prairie Path
- North Shore Channel Trail
