= Lucien Boneparte Covell House =

Historic house in Illinois, United States

- U.S. National Register of Historic Places
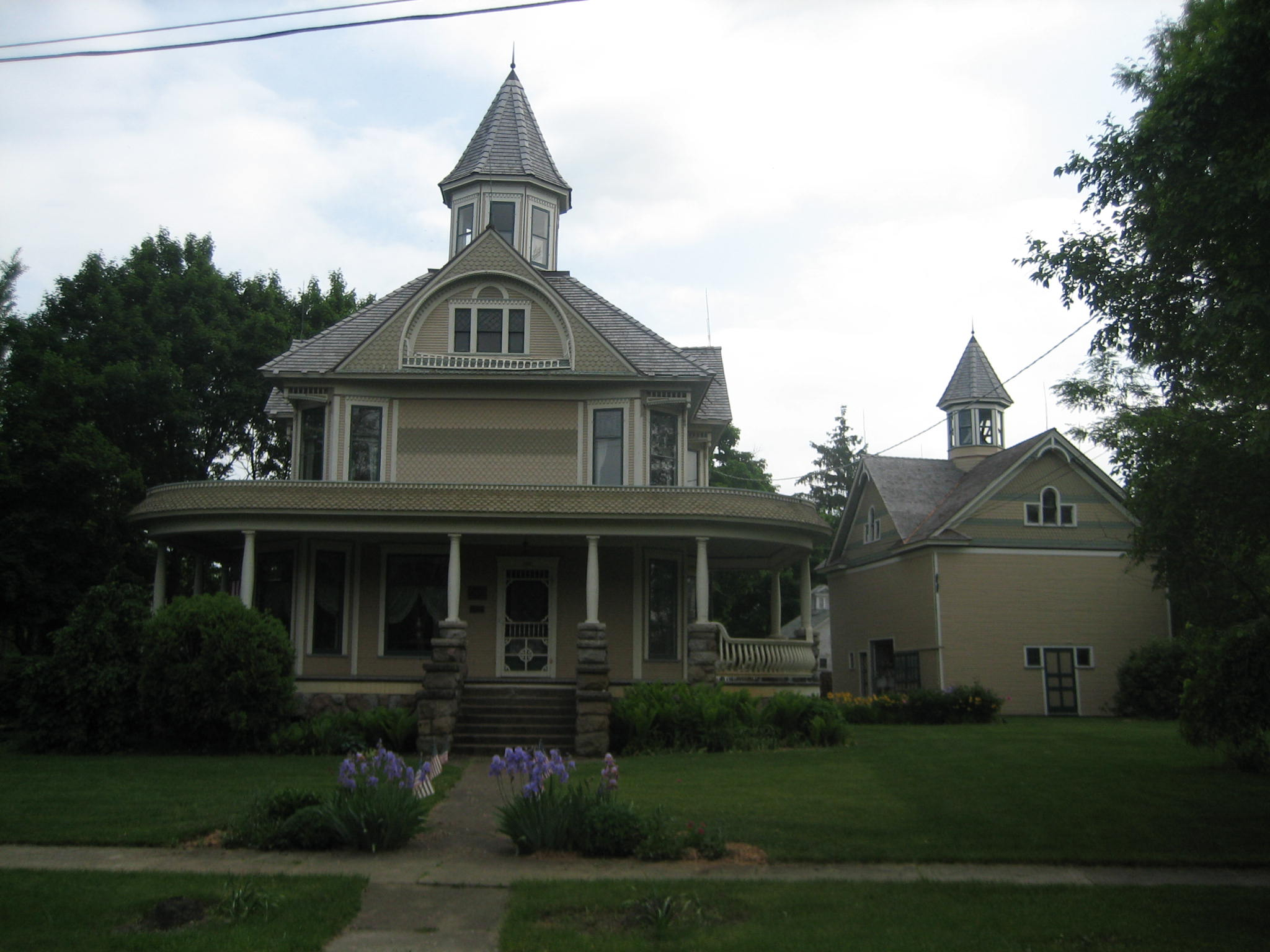

- Location within Illinois Location within the United States
- Location: 5805 Broadway, Richmond, Illinois
- Coordinates: 42°28′35″N 88°18′42″W
- Area: 0.7 acres (0.28 ha)
- Built: 1905
- Architectural style: Queen Anne
- NRHP reference No.: 88003246
- Added to NRHP: January 26, 1989

The Lucien Boneparte Covell House is a historic house located in the village of Richmond, Illinois, USA. The house is an example of Queen Anne style architecture and was built in 1905. The Covell House was listed on the U.S. National Register of Historic Places in 1989.

== History ==
The Lucien Boneparte Covell House was built in 1905 for Lucien Boneparte Covell and Anna Moore Covell. The couple lived in the home until they died, in 1923 and 1926. During the 1930s the home was used as a funeral parlor but by the 1960s the house had again returned to single-family use with no additional commercial functions.

== Architecture ==
The Covell House is an example of Late Victorian Queen Anne style architecture detailed with some elements of Colonial Revival. As a typical example of the style the house has a main roof ridge that runs parallel with the side elevations of the building with seven gables crossing it in various manners. Patterned shingles in the bays and in the gables heighten the structure's surface texturing and a full-width veranda extends along both side walls.

== Historic significance ==
The house is a distinctive example of Late Victorian Queen Anne architecture which embodies the elements of the style. In addition, the house contains several key transitional elements of Colonial Revival. Aside from the stylistic elements, the intact interior detailing and two intact original outbuildings help make the Covell House a significant example of Queen Anne style. The house is distinct from other examples of Queen Anne architecture in Richmond and the surrounding area in its Colonial Revival elements and detailing. These reasons, among others, were cited as justification when the property, including its two outbuildings, was listed on the U.S. National Register of Historic Places on January 26, 1989.

== Outbuildings ==
The Covell House property includes two separate original outbuildings, a carriage house and a buildings that served three functions, privy, wood shed and chicken coop. Both buildings were constructed concurrently with the house in 1905 and both are considered contributing buildings for the purpose of the National Register of Historic Places listing.
