= Christian Geister House =

Historic house in Illinois, United States

- U.S. National Register of Historic Places
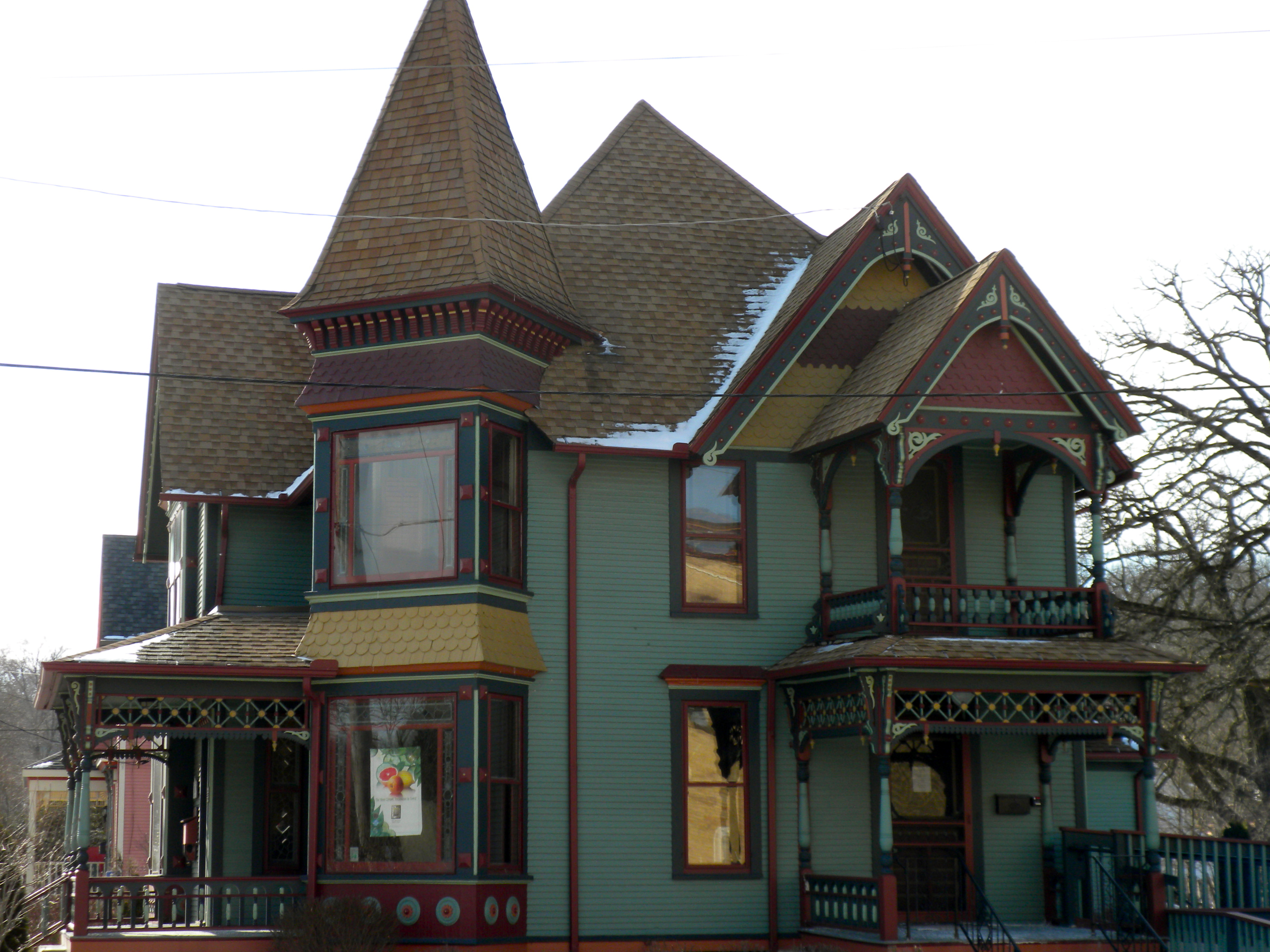

- Location within Illinois Location within the United States
- Location: 302 S. Main St., Algonquin, Illinois
- Coordinates: 42°9′55″N 88°17′38″W
- Area: 1 acre (0.40 ha)
- Built: 1894
- Built by: Amos Wilburn
- Architectural style: Queen Anne
- NRHP reference No.: 07000453
- Added to NRHP: September 25, 2007

The Christian Geister House is a historic residence in Algonquin, Illinois.

== History ==
Algonquin, Illinois was first settled in the Fox River Valley in 1831. By the 1880s, the town had grown enough to require a school, library, and public telephone exchange. It was shortly thereafter that a second wave of houses was built in the town. Small pioneer residences were moved and grand Victorian houses were constructed in their place. In 1892, a local carpenter by the name of Amos Wilburn began to build a Victorian house at 302 South Main Street. Christian Geister purchased the land from Ira C. Goodrich for $1,400 in 1893 while the house was being built. Gesiter owned a grist mill and served as village treasurer. He lived there until 1909, when Mrs. Emma Haeger Estergren (of the Haeger family) purchased the home. She lived on the second floor until her death in the 1970s. Estergren was active in the Women's Suffrage movement and was an activist for animal rights. The house was listed on the National Register of Historic Places by the National Park Service on September 25, 2007. It was the first building in Algonquin to receive this distinction.

== Architecture ==
The Christian Geister House is an excellent example of Queen Anne architecture. It has a steeply pitched cross-gabled roof with two front and two side gables (one on each side). There are also lower intersection gables on the north and west sides, plus a gabled dormer on the west side and a sloped dormer on the east side. A square turret tower is found at the northeast corner, peaking 10 feet (3.0 m) above the roof line. The roof and turret are covered with asphalt shingles. The turret eaves are decorated with brackets on the three exposed sides. A narrower eave is found below the brackets. A bay window is under the narrow eave. Window millwork is decorated with twelve ornamental squares. A second narrow set of eaves is under the window, over a first-floor bay window, likewise decorated with millwork. The base of the turret features eight decorative roundels. The Geister House has wood clapboard siding with a limestone foundation. The remaining windows are one-over-one double sash with wood frames. All first-floor windows have decorative eaves, except for those on the west side, which are plain. The east side of the house includes a stained glass picture window, flanked with stained glass sidelights, Five decorative roundels are found under this window. There are three small windows on the third floor, two on the west and one on the east. The basement has several plain garden view windows. The house includes three porches. The west porch has concrete steps and a railing and is attached to an enclosed porch. The northern porch has two stories. The first-story porch extends 3 feet (0.91 m) farther than the second-story porch. The eastern porch leads to the main entrance to the house.
