= Stratton Lock and Dam =

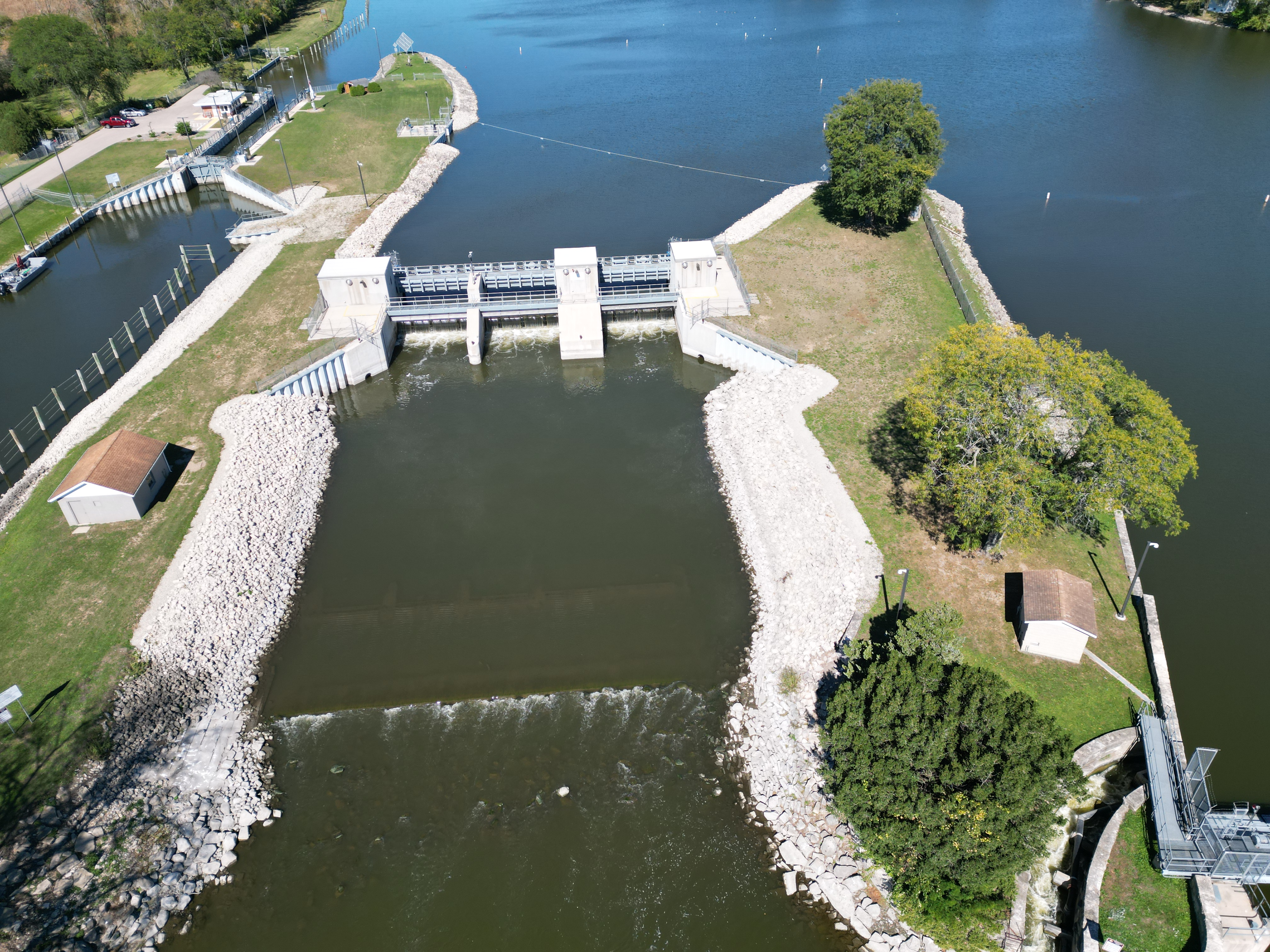
- Interactive map of Stratton Lock and Dam
- Official name: William G. Stratton - Thomas A. Bolger Lock and Dam
- Country: US
- Location: Nunda Township, McHenry County, Illinois
- Coordinates: 42°18′36″N 88°15′6″W
- Purpose: Navigation
- Status: Operational
- Construction began: 1939
- Owner: Illinois Department of Natural Resources

Dam and spillways
- Impounds: Fox River
- Elevation at crest: 736.68 ft. NGVD
- Width (crest): 221 ft

Reservoir
- Creates: Chain O'Lakes
- Surface area: 6,900 Acres
- Website https://dnr.illinois.gov/waterresources/strattonlockanddam.html

The Stratton Lock and Dam (known until 1991 as the McHenry Dam, officially named the William G. Stratton - Thomas A. Bolger Lock and Dam) is a dam in Nunda Township, McHenry County, Illinois. It is named after former Governor William Stratton and Representative Thomas A. Bolger. The dam is the only dam on the Fox River (Illinois, US) that is served by a lock system.

== Construction ==
The first dam at the site was a wooden dam built in 1907. This dam deteriorated and was replaced by a steel sheet piling design sometime before 1915. A lock was constructed at the same time. The lock and dam were conveyed to the Illinois DNR in 1923-24. Significant damage to the structure occurred during flooding in November 1937 and July 1938. Due to this damage, the State of Illinois Department of Public Works and Buildings, Division of Waterways, built the present dam and control structure in 1939. The present lock was constructed in 1958-1960 and opened for use on June 1, 1960.

The dam features a spillway crest 221' long at elevation 736.7, a 50' long hinged crest gate with variable height from 6" above spillway (737.2) to 730.3; installed in 2002, and five sluice gates that are 13.75' long.

=== Extension ===
The Stratton Lock and Dam Life Extension Project, announced in 2014, included the construction of a new controlling structure immediately upstream of the 1939 dam, berm rehabilitation along the west side of the Fox River due to erosion, and the extension of the lock downstream, doubling its capacity. The work was completed before the start of the 2017 boating season.

== Operations ==
The Dam maintains the Fox Chain O'Lakes Pool levels while the Lock provides recreational passage between the Fox Chain O'Lakes in northern Illinois, and the Fox River for recreational watercraft from May through October and is closed for the winter season each year from November 1 through April 30. An average of 17,000 boats pass through the aging locks annually, along with millions of gallons of water.

The facility is owned and run by the Illinois Department of Natural Resources. The lock operates for all powered, sail-driven, or paddle-propelled canoes or boats, even float tubes, at no charge.

The operation goals of Stratton Dam are to maintain a recreational pool, utilize available storage in the Chain of Lakes to minimize regional flooding, maintain minimum flows for water supply and aquatic habitat, and limit flows during ice jam periods.
