= McHenry High School =

McHenry Community High School
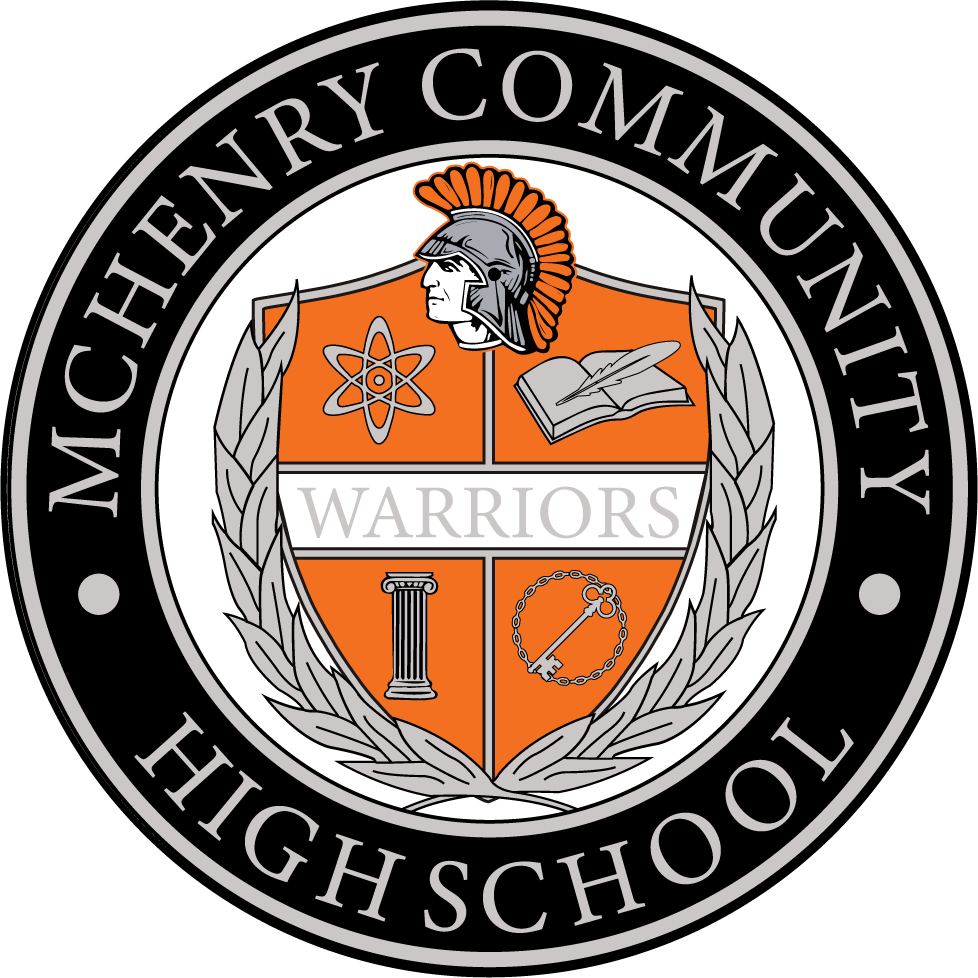

Location
- 4724 W Crystal Lake Rd, McHenry, IL 60050 (Upper Campus); 1012 N Green St, McHenry, IL 60050 (Freshman Campus); United States; 42.33578°N 88.28971°W (Upper Campus); 42.3421°N 88.2669°W (Freshman Campus)

Information
- Established: c. 1924
- Superintendent: Ryan McTague
- CEEB code: 142830
- Principal: Greg Eiserman
- Teaching staff: 146.10 (FTE)
- Grades: 9 - 12
- Enrollment: 2,231 (2023–2024)
- Student to teacher ratio: 15.27
- Color: Orange Black
- Song: McHenry Warrior Fight Song
- Athletics conference: Fox Valley Conference
- Mascot: Leonidas the Warrior
- Newspaper: The McHenry Messenger themchenrymessenger.com
- Feeder schools: McHenry Middle School Parkland Middle School Harrison Elementary School
- Website: www.dist156.org

McHenry Community High School (MCHS) is a four-year public high school located in McHenry, Illinois, a far northwestern suburb of Chicago, Illinois. It is part of McHenry Community High School District 156, which operates two separate campuses: the Freshman Campus and the Upper Campus. The Freshman Campus, established in 1924, currently enrolls 9th-grade students. The Upper Campus, established in 1968, enrolls 10th through 12th-grade students. The high school serves students from McHenry, Wonder Lake, Bull Valley, Holiday Hills, McCullom Lake, and Lakemoor. Since 2025, Greg Eiserman, has been the principal of both campuses. The school's colors are orange and black, and its mascot, Leonidas the Warrior, represents the school's Warrior identity.

== History ==
Initially established as McHenry Community High School in 1924, the Freshman Campus opened its doors for the 1923–1924 school year, marking the first campus for McHenry Community High School District 156. This campus housed 9th through 12th grade students from 1924 until 1968.

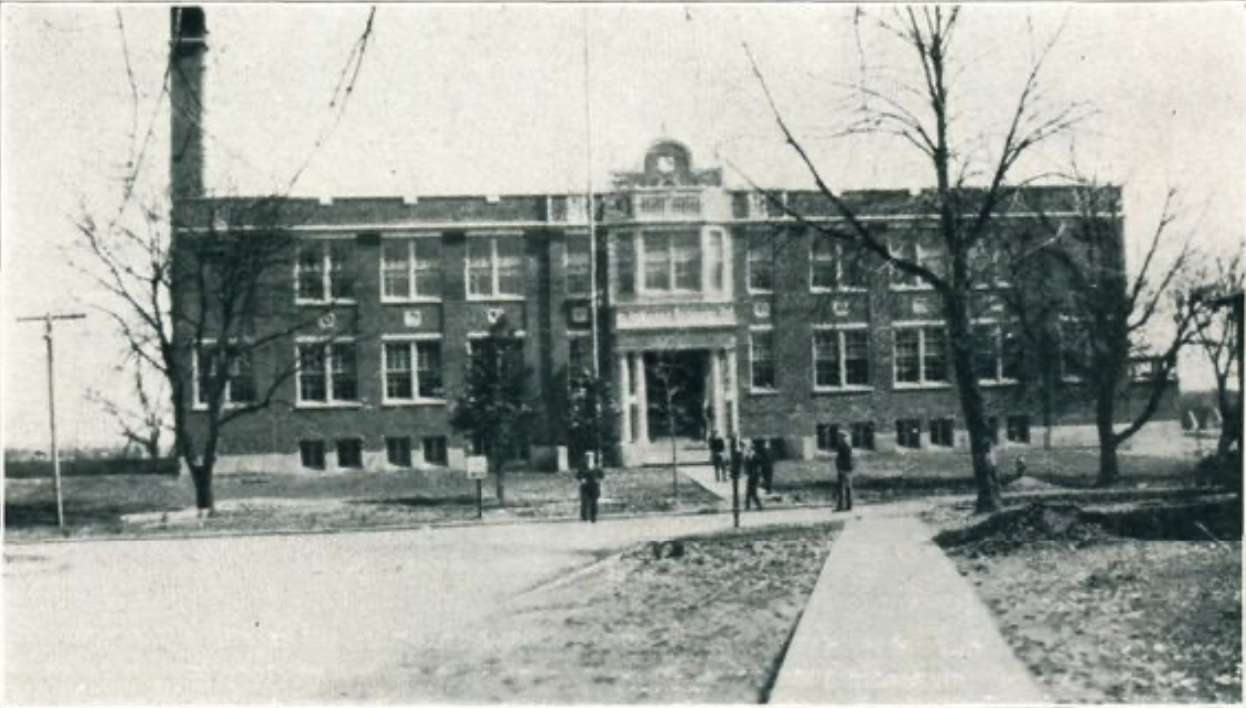
McHenry East High School c. 1926

In 1968, McHenry High School - Upper Campus, established as McHenry High School - West Campus, opened its doors to 11th and 12th-grade students to accommodate the population growth in McHenry and its surrounding towns. Simultaneously, East Campus began serving 9th and 10th graders. This arrangement persisted until Johnsburg High School opened in 1978.

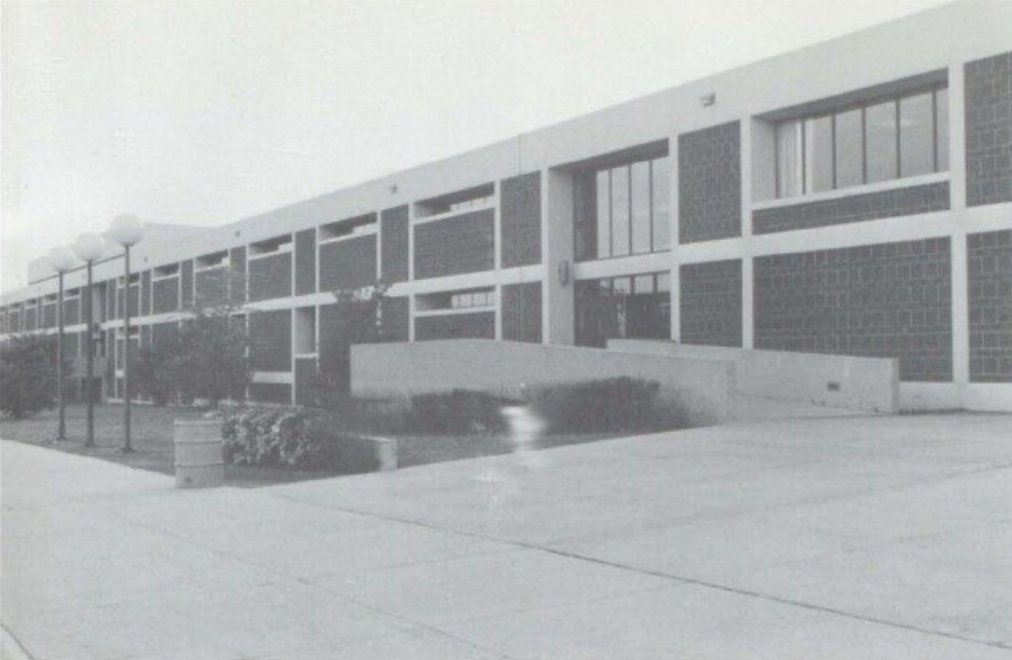
East facing side of McHenry West High School c. 1977

In 1979, following the departure of Johnsburg High School students, both East and West Campuses transitioned into four-year high schools after significant remodeling of the East Campus, which included modernizing the building and installing a new ventilation system. The serving boundaries between the West and East Campuses were established, with Illinois Route 31 serving as the primary dividing line. The administration faced criticism for this decision. Despite having two separate campuses, they operated under McHenry Community High School to maintain a unified Warrior identity and spirit.

Throughout the 1980s and 1990s, both East and West campus grew to capacity as McHenry County became one of the fastest-growing counties in the United States during the 1990s population boom. Despite several failed referendums in the 1990s to expand the Upper Campus and improve the Freshman Campus, a referendum was finally approved in 2000.

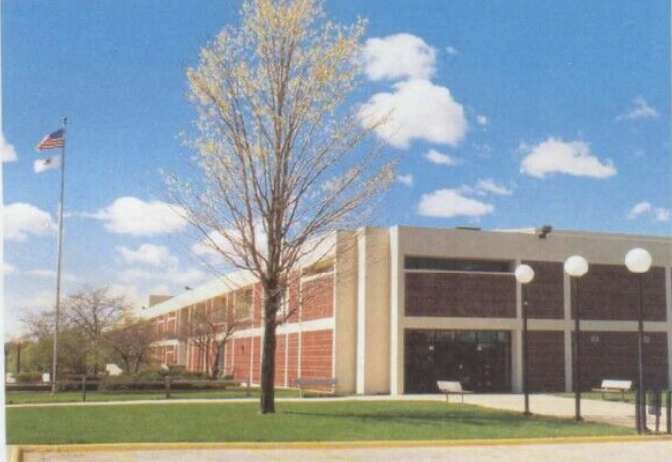
McHenry West High School in 1999, before the 2003 building expansion.

Construction began that same year and was completed in 2003, adding 24 classrooms, new gym with 2,000 seats, new cafeteria, and staircases (known as Freshman, Sophomore, Junior and Senior Towers) to the Upper Campus, which expanded its capacity to nearly 1,600 students. The Freshman Campus remained at around 950 students. Following the completion of these additions, boundaries were adjusted to reflect the increased facility space. However, since the 2003 expansion, disparities between the Upper and Freshman Campuses have grown, with the Upper Campus offering more space and opportunities for student success than the Freshman Campus.

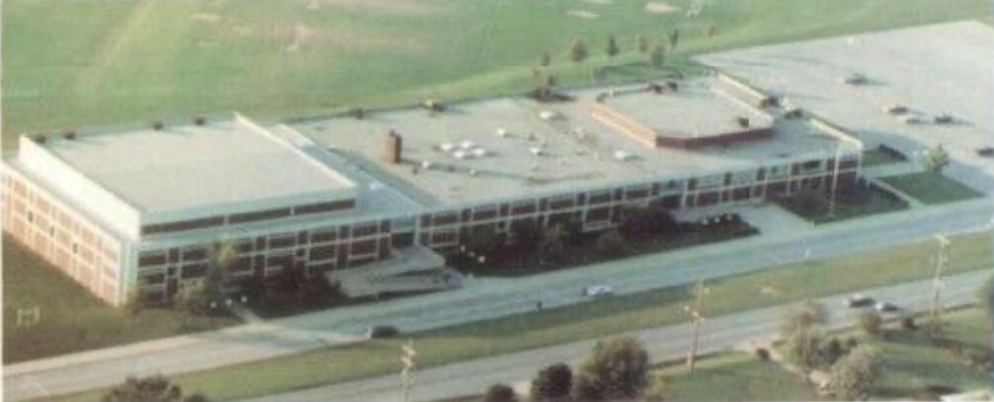
Aerial view of McHenry West High School, before the 2003 additions. c. 1984

During the 2010s, the McHenry High School district developed over 20 Advanced Placement courses and a variety of dynamic, 21st-century electives. In a 2018 statement, the school district noted, "As our curriculum offerings become more modern and advanced, East [Freshman] Campus students have increasingly been forced to travel to West [Upper] Campus or select other opportunities. About a quarter of all MCHS students travel, and about 23% of teachers. The vast majority of East [Freshman] Campus students have to travel at some point during high school, and many find themselves attending multiple classes at West [Upper] Campus during the school day."

As these inequities grew between the West and East Campuses, district officials approved a $44 million referendum to be placed on the ballot, asking voters whether they would approve the addition of a new Science, Technology, and Industry Center at the McHenry High School Upper Campus, along with building improvements at both campuses. The referendum was approved by voters in 2018, construction began in 2019, and was completed in the summer of 2021.

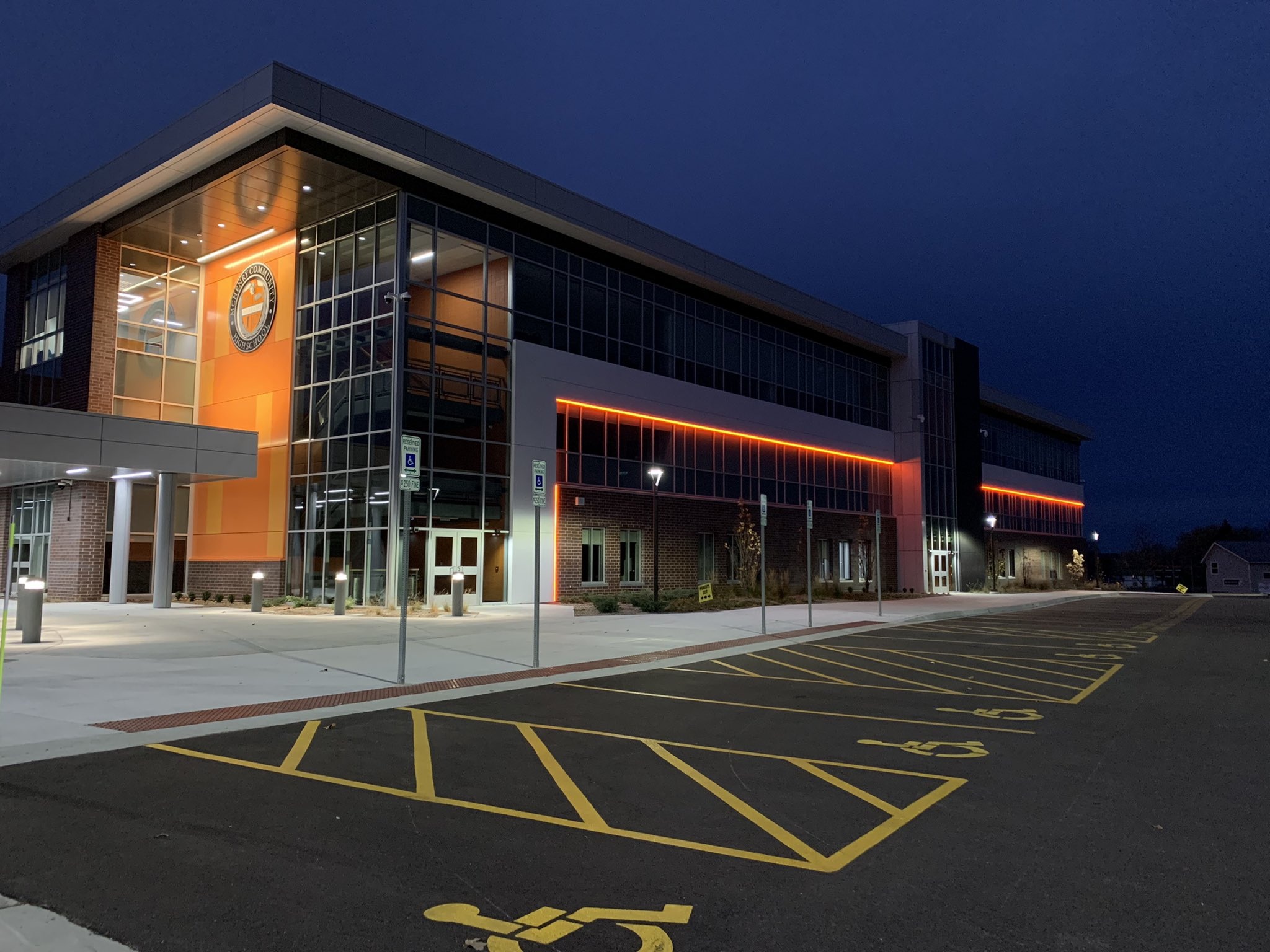
New addition to McHenry High School - Upper Campus. North-facing side. c. 2021–22.

In 2021, following the addition of the new Science, Technology, and Industry Center at the Upper Campus and the grade restructuring between both campuses, McHenry High School became the first and only high school in McHenry County with a dedicated facility of this kind. The Upper Campus building and parking lot were significantly expanded to accommodate 10th through 12th-grade students transitioning from the Freshman Campus (East Campus). Fluorescent lighting was replaced with energy-efficient LED lights in classrooms, and new furniture, including chairs and tables, was added to the commons areas. Additional improvements included the expansion of tennis courts, the construction of new varsity baseball and softball fields, and upgrades to McCracken Field, which received new turf and lighting for soccer and football practices and games. Safety enhancements, such as the BluePoint system, were also implemented, allowing anyone to alert local police of an emergency situation at the high school.

== Academics ==
McHenry High School offers over 30 Advanced Placement courses and dual credit pathways. The AP® participation rate at McHenry High School-Upper Campus was 45% in the 2020–21 school year. The high school also holds a 70,000 square foot State-of-the-Art Center for Science, Technology, and Industry Center for courses in biology, computer science, manufacturing such as a t-shirt print shop, automotive course, technology rooms for robotics, applied engineering, and computer sciences, e-Sports, classrooms dedicated to biology and medical studies, and new journalism classrooms.

== Student body ==
In the school year 2022–2023, McHenry High School enrolled a total of 2,190 students.

=== Racial Makeup ===
In the 2022–2023 school year, McHenry High School enrolled 71% of White students, 1.1% of Black students, 25.1% of Hispanic students, 1.4% of Asian students, 0% of Native Hawaiian/Pacific Islander, and 1.1% of students with two or more races.

=== Enrollments by Grade ===
In the 2022–2023 school year, McHenry High School enrolled 554 students in 9th grade, 554 students in 10th grade, 538 students in 11th, and 544 students in 12th grade.

== Athletics ==
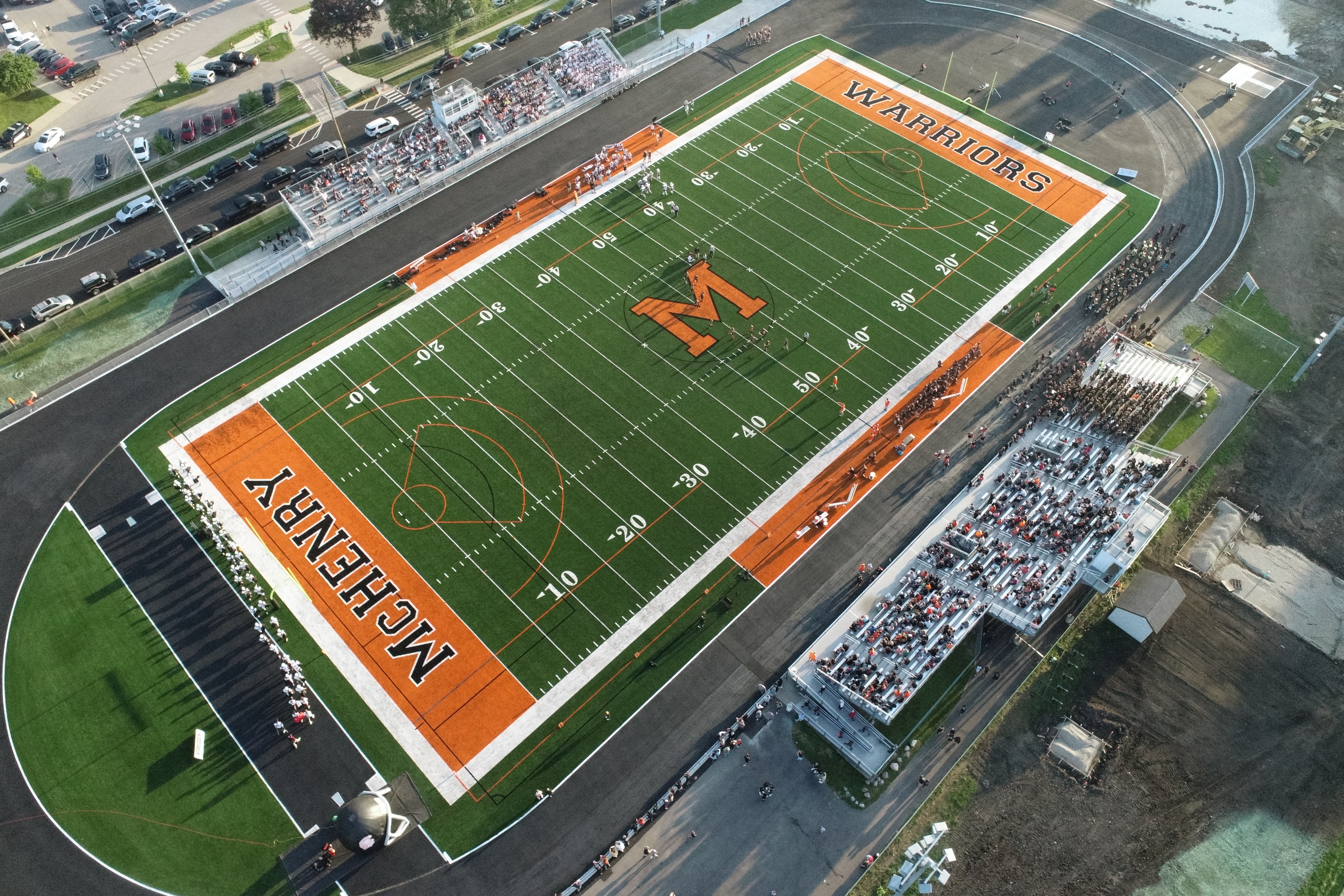
McCracken Field c. 2022

=== McCracken Field ===
McHenry High School primarily hosts their football, soccer, track, softball, and baseball matches and practices at McCracken Field, commonly referred to as McCracken. Since 2024, McHenry High School moved baseball matches and practices to its main campus' field.

=== Athletic Teams and Memberships ===
McHenry High School is a member of the Fox Valley Conference (FVC) and Illinois High School Association (IHSA). McHenry High School currently offers the following athletic teams:

Athletic Teams
Co-Ed	Girls	Boys
Soccer	Badminton	Baseball
Cross Country	Cheerleading	Football
Lacrosse	Dance	Water Polo
Wrestling	Softball	
Track & Field	Volleyball	
Tennis		
Bowling		
Swimming		
Basketball		
Golf		

=== Athletic Achievements ===
The table below depicts the highest achievements that McHenry High School athletic teams have earned. These achievements only include achievements associated with the Illinois High School Association (IHSA) in teams, not individuals.

IHSA Achievements
Team	Highest Achievement Earned	Year(s)
Boys Varsity Football	Playoffs Qualifier	2016-2017
Boys Varsity Basketball	State Sectional	1975-1976
Boys Varsity Baseball	State Qualifier	2021-2022
Boys Cross Country	3rd Place State Champions	1981-1982
Boys Golf	2nd Place State Champions	1978, 1983
Boys Wrestling	Regional Champions	1989, 1994, 1995, 2000, 2005
Boys Varsity Soccer	Sectional Champions	2016-2017
Girls Cheer	13th Place State Champions	2018-2019
Girls Golf	Sectional Qualifier	2016-2017
Girls Softball	Regional Qualifier	2013, 2014, 2015, 2018, 2021
Girls Cross Country	Sectional Qualifier	2022-2023
Boys Tennis	Sectional Qualifier	1988-1989
Boys Water Polo	State Qualifier	2009, 2010, 2011
Girls Cheerleading	State Qualifier	2006, 2016, 2018, 2019, 2020, 2021
Girls Badminton	Sectional Qualifier	1987, 1988, 1990, 1993, 1994, 1995, 1996
Girls Basketball	Regional Qualifier	2003, 2004, 2018
Girls Bowling	Regional Qualifier	2021-2022
Girls Soccer	Regional Qualifier	2008, 2009, 2014
Girls Tennis	Sectional Qualifier	1991, 1996, 1997, 1998

== Notable alumni ==
=== Upper Campus Alumni ===
None at this moment.

=== West Campus Alumni ===
- Matt Skiba (Class of 1994) – best known for lead singer of Alkaline Trio and Blink-182.
- Jason Faunt (Class of 1992) – actor best known for Wesley Collins on Power Rangers Time Force
- Ryan Sierakowski (Class of 2015) – professional Major League Soccer player (Portland Timbers)
- Bobby Miller (Class of 2017) – professional Major League Baseball pitcher (Los Angeles Dodgers)

=== East Campus Alumni ===
- Chuck Hiller (Class of 1952) – former Major League Baseball player (San Francisco Giants, New York Mets, Philadelphia Phillies, Pittsburgh Pirates)
- Gary Adams (Class of 1961) – founder of TaylorMade Golf Company.
- Jim Althoff (Class of 1979) – former professional National Football League player for the Chicago Bears.
- Robert Tonyan (Class of 2012) – professional National Football League player for the Minnesota Vikings.
