= Wonder Lake =

Wonder Lake can refer to:

- Wonder Lake (village), Illinois, a village in the United States
- Wonder Lake (CDP), Illinois, a census designated place in the United States
- Wonder Lake State Park, in Putnam County, New York, United States
- Wonder Lake (Alaska), a lake within Denali National Park and Preserve, United States
