= McHenry Community High School District 156 =

School district in McHenry County, Illinois, United States

Address
- 4716 West Crystal Lake Road McHenry, McHenry County, Illinois, 60050; United States

District information
- Type: Public School District
- Grades: 9–12
- Superintendent: Ryan McTague
- Schools: 2
- Budget: US$33 million (2015)
- NCES District ID: 1725320

Students and staff
- Students: 2,318 (2015–16)
- Student–teacher ratio: 16.65 (2014–15)

Other information
- Website: www.dist156.org

McHenry Community High School District 156 is a public school district that serves parts of McHenry County, Illinois. This includes the communities of McHenry, Bull Valley, Wonder Lake, Lakemoor, and McCullom Lake. It also serves small portions of Johnsburg, Woodstock, and Crystal Lake.

== Schools ==
The McHenry Community High School District 156 operates two different campuses that serves students in different parts of McHenry County. The main campus is McHenry High School - Upper Campus, which only serves students between 10th grade and 12th grade. The Freshman Campus only serves students in 9th grade.

- McHenry West High School
- McHenry East High School
