= HSD =

HSD may refer to:

== School districts ==
- Hackett School District, in Arkansas, United States
- Harrison School District (disambiguation)
- Hazelwood School District, in Missouri, United States
- Hillsboro School District in Oregon, United States

== Other uses ==
- Hamstead railway station, England
- Hardanger Sunnhordlandske Dampskipsselskap, a former Norwegian transport company
- Heliophysics Science Division, a branch of the United States National Atmospheric and Space Administration
- High School Diploma
- Historical Society of Delaware
- Hollywood Stunt Driver, a live show at Warner Bros. Movie World
- Homeland Security Department
- Hybrid Synergy Drive, a set of hybrid car technologies
- Hydroxysteroid dehydrogenase
- Hypoactive sexual desire, a disorder characterized as a lack or absence of sexual fantasies and desire for sexual activity
- Hypermobility spectrum disorder
- Tukey's honest significant difference test
