= Raymond Vohasek =

American football player (born 1999)

No. 59
- Position: Nose tackle

Personal information
- Born: March 8, 1999 (age 27); McHenry, Illinois, U.S.
- Listed height: 6 ft 2 in (1.88 m)
- Listed weight: 311 lb (141 kg)

Career information
- High school: McHenry East
- College: College of DuPage (2017–2018); North Carolina (2019–2022)
- NFL draft: 2023: 7th round, 227th overall pick

Career history
- Jacksonville Jaguars (2023)*
- * Offseason or practice squad member only
- Stats at Pro Football Reference

Raymond Vohasek (born March 8, 1999) is an American former football nose tackle. He played college football at DuPage and North Carolina.

== Early life ==
Vohasek grew up in McHenry, Illinois. He attended McHenry East High School and played six different positions, including offensively guard, fullback, and tight end, while on defense nose guard, middle linebacker and defensive end. Although a top player at McHenry East, Vohasek received no Division I offers and committed to play college football for the College of DuPage Chaparrals.

== College career ==
At the College of DuPage in 2017, Vohasek posted a team-leading 8.5 sacks and additionally tallied 33 tackles, 14 of which were for a loss. He posted these numbers despite having played through a torn labrum the entire season. He did not play and redshirted the 2018 season to allow his shoulder to heal. Vohasek was ranked by 247Sports a three-star junior college recruit and the best player in the state of Illinois. He transferred to play for the North Carolina Tar Heels in 2019.

In his first season with the Tar Heels, Vohasek made 12 appearances and totaled 15 tackles, one sack and 5.0 tackles-for-loss. The following year, he started all 11 games and posted 29 tackles, placed third on the team with 7.0 tackles-for-loss, and recorded two pass breakups with four quarterback hurries, earning honorable mention all-conference honors. Vohasek again earned honorable mention all-conference honors in 2021, after making 38 tackles, 4.0 for-loss, one sack, three pass breakups and four hurries. He started the first five games of the 2022 season, collecting 14 tackles and one tackle-for-loss, before suffering a season-ending injury. Vohasek finished his stint at North Carolina with 41 games played, including 29 as a starter, 96 tackles, 17 tackles-for-loss and 5.5 sacks.

== Professional career ==
Pre-draft measurables
Height	Weight	Arm length	Hand span	40-yard dash	10-yard split	20-yard split	20-yard shuttle	Three-cone drill	Vertical jump	Broad jump
6 ft 2 1/4 in (1.89 m)	306 lb (139 kg)	32 3/8 in (0.82 m)	10 3/8 in (0.26 m)	5.10 s	1.82 s	2.88 s	4.62 s	7.68 s	25.5 in (0.65 m)	8 ft 5 in (2.57 m)

Vohasek was selected by the Jacksonville Jaguars in the seventh round (227th overall) of the 2023 NFL draft. He was waived on August 29, 2023.
