= Terwilliger House =

Historic house in Illinois, United States

- U.S. National Register of Historic Places
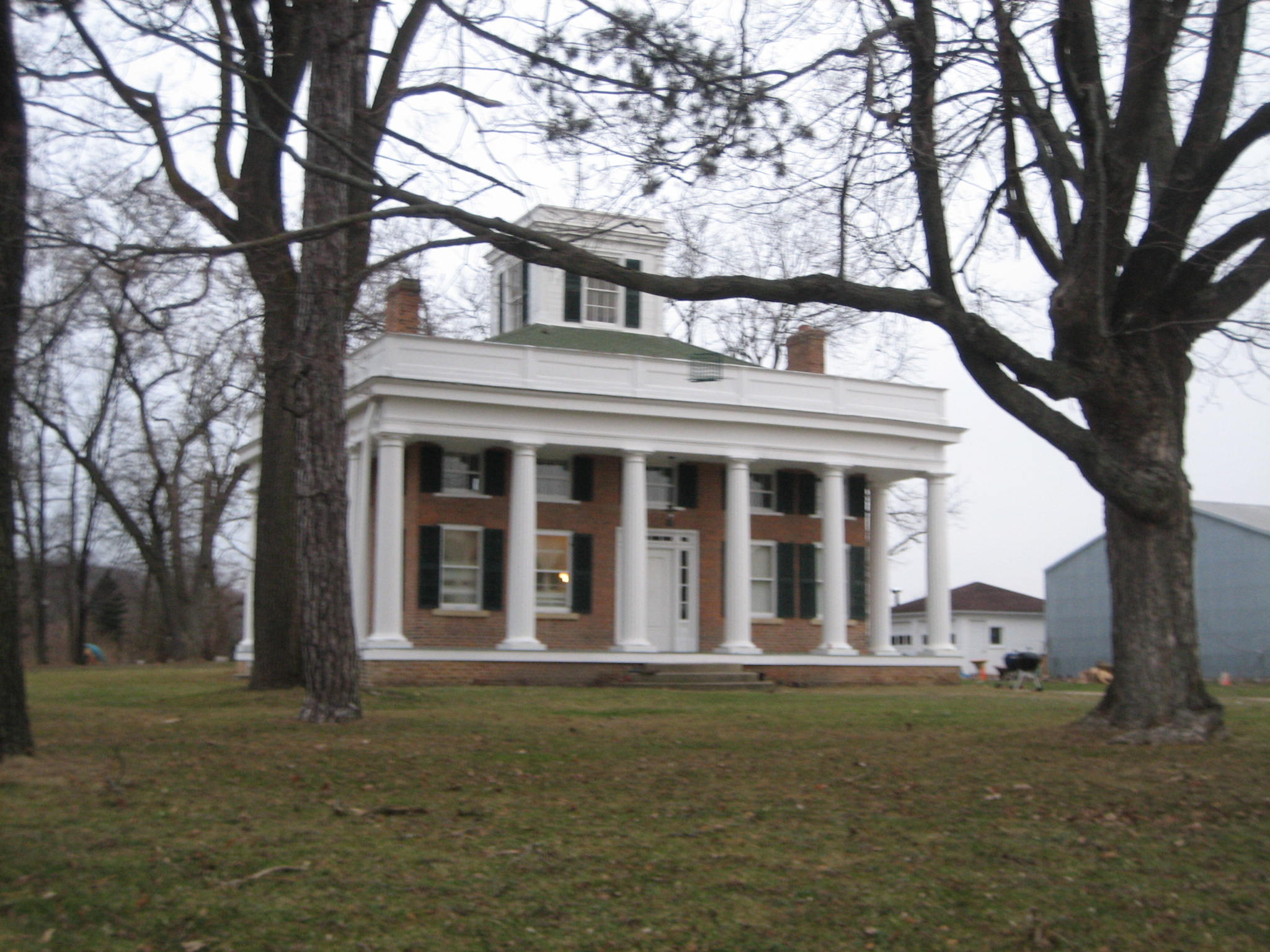
- Terwilliger House in Bull Valley, Illinois, near the McHenry County seat of Woodstock.

- Location within Illinois Location within the United States
- Location: Bull Valley, McHenry County, Illinois
- Coordinates: 42°18′58″N 88°22′1″W
- Area: less than one acre
- Built: 1849
- Architectural style: Greek
- NRHP reference No.: 79003116
- Added to NRHP: May 14, 1979

The 1849 Terwilliger House is a Registered Historic Place in the McHenry County, Illinois, village of Bull Valley. The Greek Revival house is topped with a square cupola and surrounded by a columned porch. Rumors persist that the home was once a part of the Underground Railroad.

== History ==
Samuel Terwilliger was the third settler of Nunda Township in McHenry County, Illinois, after George Stickney and Benjamin McOmber. Arriving in 1836, he was the first farmer in the region, and his son was the first child in the township born to a settler. Terwilliger married the daughter of the neighboring property. Combining the two properties, he built a Greek Revival estate in 1849. Oral history suggests that the house may have been a stop on the Underground Railroad. The house remained in ownership of Terwilliger descendants for at least 141 years. On May 14, 1979, the house was recognized by the National Park Service with a listing on the National Register of Historic Places.

== Architecture ==
The two-story house is square, with entrances on the east, south, and north. The house is built on a foundation of fieldstone and locally produced soft red brick. The east facade features two windows flanking the door and four regularly spaced windows on the second floor. The doors on the north and south are off center, with three windows on each side — one to the east and two to the west. The walls are built with the same soft red brick as the foundation. The Greek Revival porch dominates the southern, eastern, and northern facades with large Doric columns. The roof is hipped with a slight pitch. A cupola is at the center of the house; it is large enough to serve as a bedroom. A kitchen extension was constructed at the rear on the west side in the 1890s.

The Terwilliger House contained an underground tunnel that went from the northwest corner of the basement of the original brick structure and traveled northwest into the adjoining farm field. The tunnel was filled in during the late 1970s because of cave-in hazards. In addition, several hidden compartments were found while repairing walls easily large enough to hide several individuals. Despite these unique architectural features, the home’s Underground Railroad connection remains speculative most likely because secrecy was critical for the Underground Railroad success.

== Photo gallery ==
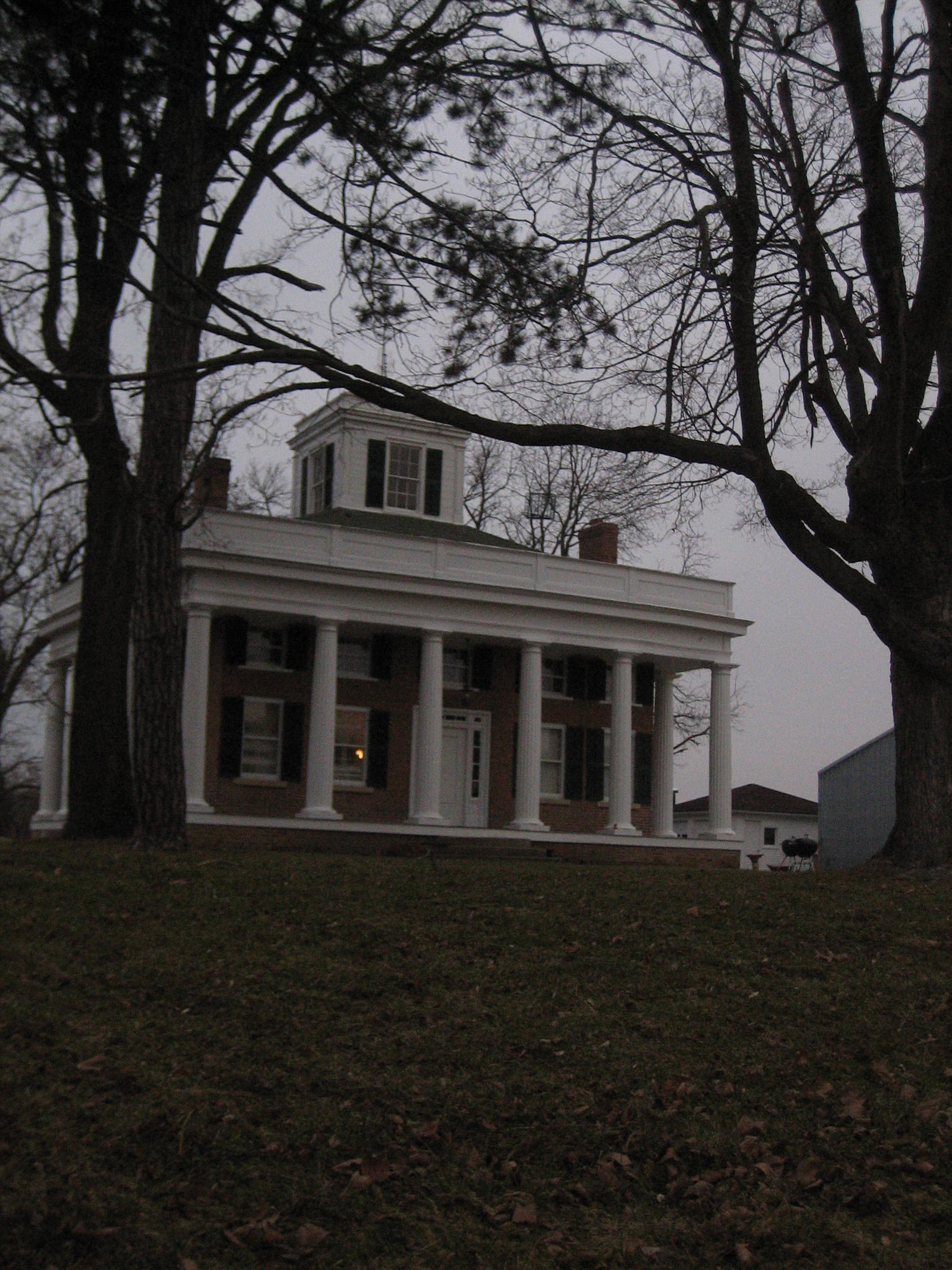

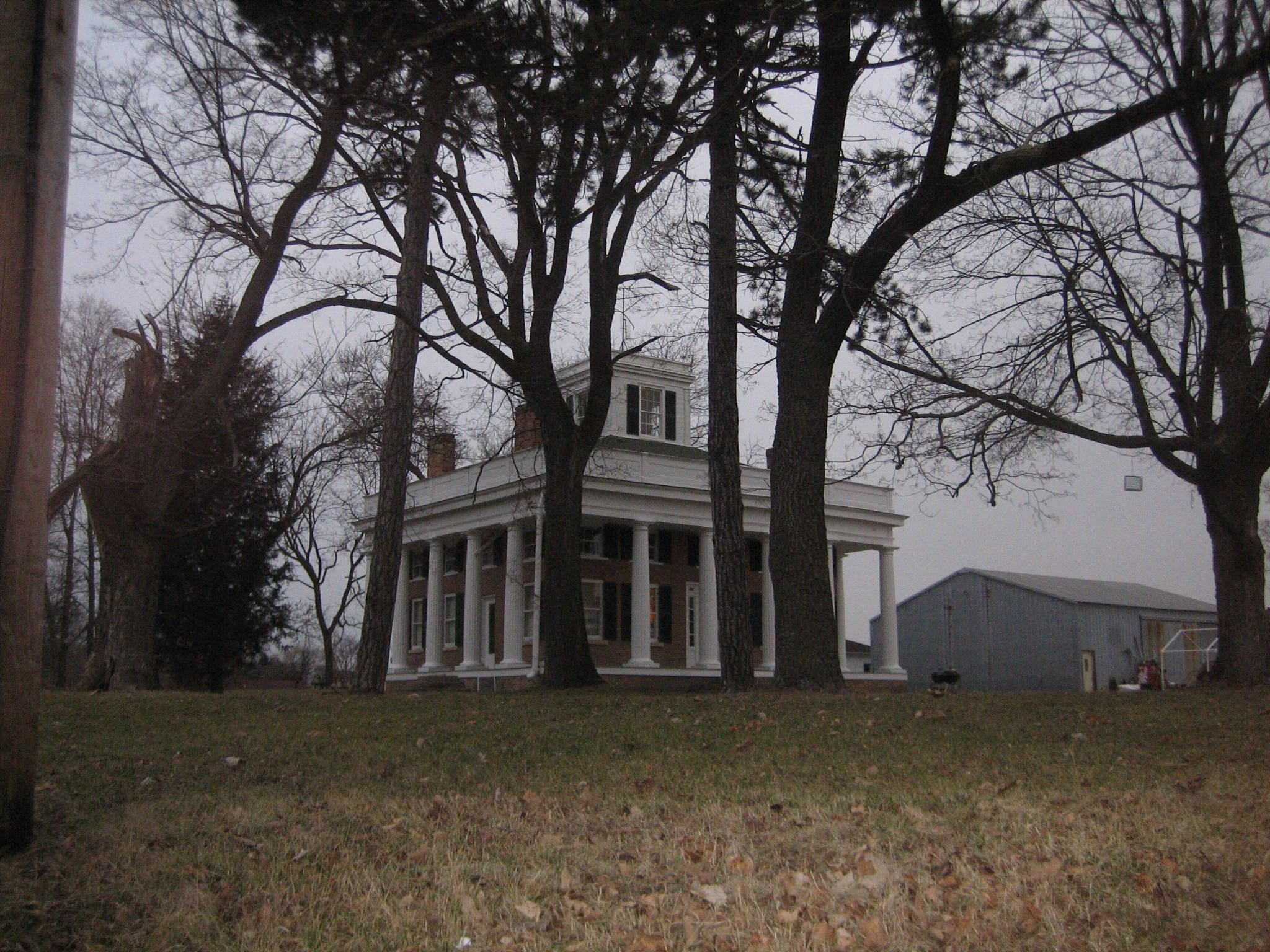

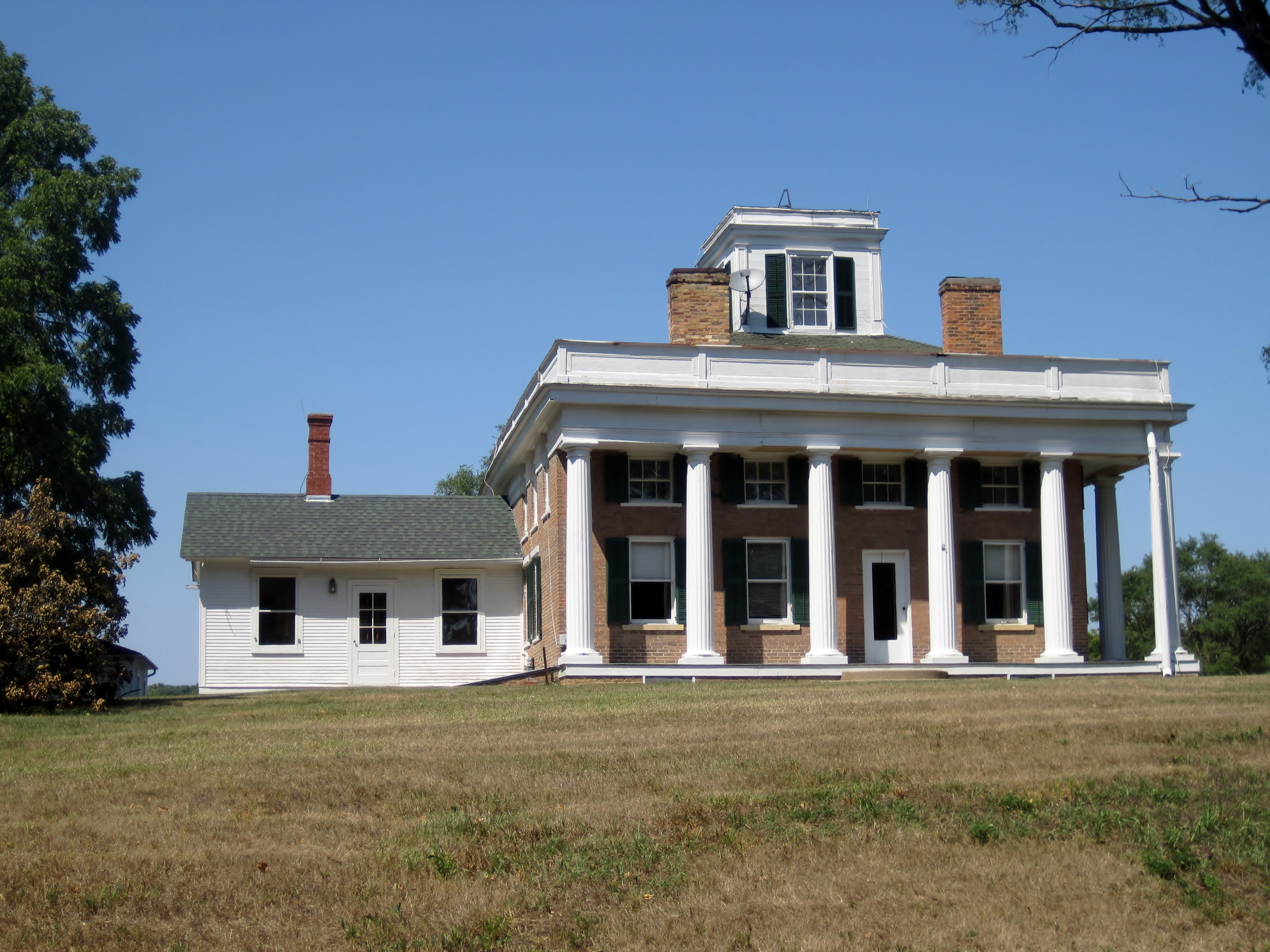

Photo of Samuel Terwilliger House Doric Columns
