= Bobby Miller (baseball) =

American baseball player (born 1999)

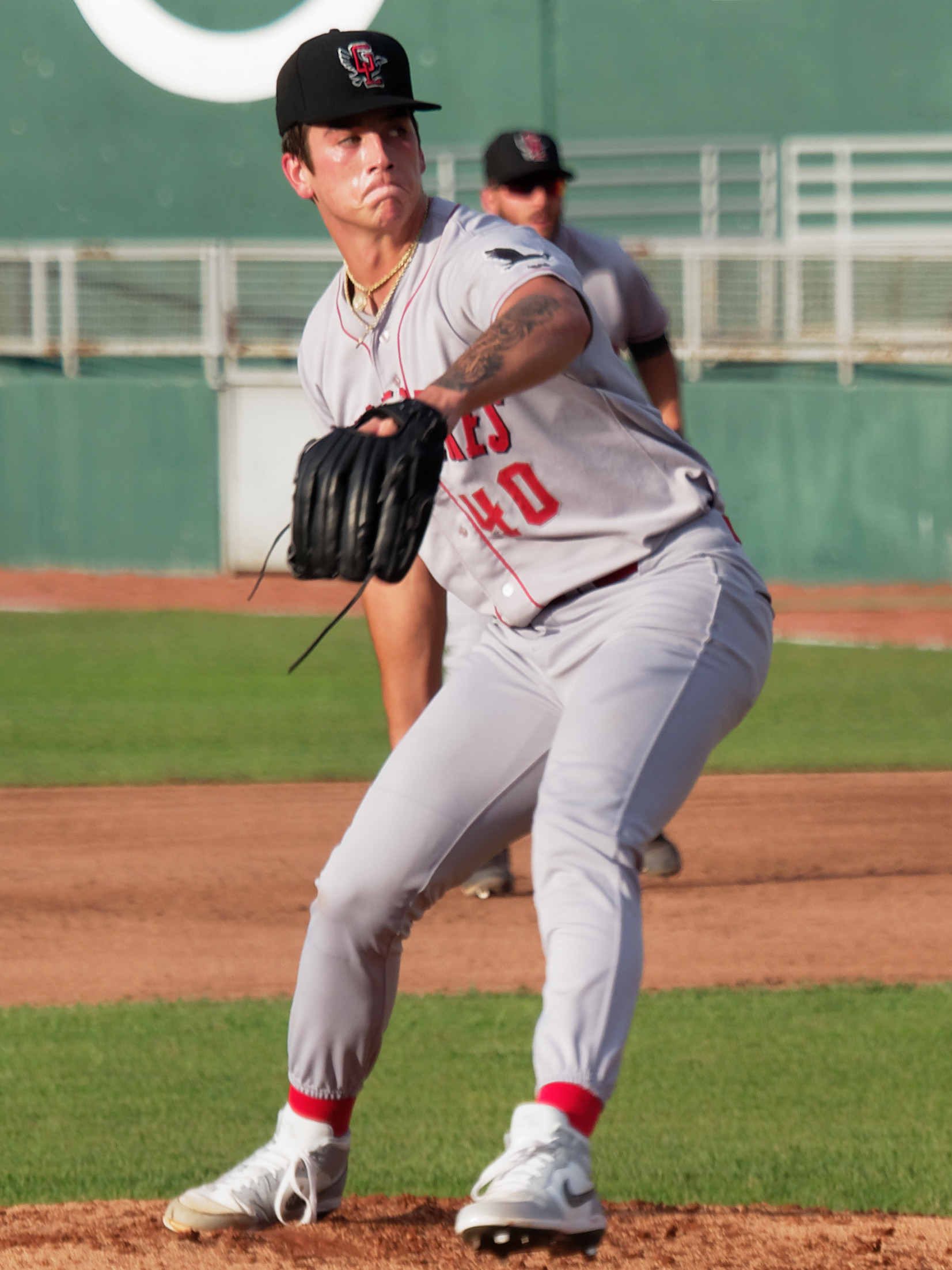
- Miller with the Great Lakes Loons in 2021

Minnesota Twins
- Pitcher
- Born: April 5, 1999 (age 27); Elk Grove Village, Illinois, U.S.
- Bats: Left Throws: Right

MLB debut
- May 23, 2023, for the Los Angeles Dodgers

MLB statistics (through 2026 season)
- Win–loss record: 14–8
- Earned run average: 5.37
- Strikeouts: 186
- Stats at Baseball Reference

Teams
- Los Angeles Dodgers (2023–2026)

Robert Anthony Miller (born April 5, 1999) is an American professional baseball pitcher for the Minnesota Twins of Major League Baseball (MLB). He has previously played in MLB for the Los Angeles Dodgers.

He played college baseball for the Louisville Cardinals and was selected 29th overall by the Dodgers in the 2020 MLB draft.

== Amateur career ==
Miller attended McHenry West High School in McHenry, Illinois, where he played baseball. In 2016, his junior season, he had a 5–2 win–loss record with a 1.98 earned run average (ERA) and 76 strikeouts over 55 innings pitched. After his senior year in 2017, the Baltimore Orioles selected him in the 38th round of the 2017 Major League Baseball draft, but he did not sign a professional contract.

Miller enrolled at the University of Louisville where he played college baseball for the Louisville Cardinals. As a freshman in 2018, Miller went 6–1 with a 2.97 ERA over 17 games (nine starts), earning Freshman All-American honors and spots on the American Athletic Conference Third Team and All-Freshman Team. After the 2018 season, he played collegiate summer baseball with the Brewster Whitecaps of the Cape Cod Baseball League. In 2019, his sophomore year at Louisville, he pitched to a 7–1 record with a 3.83 ERA over twenty games (12 starts) and eighty innings. That summer, he spent time playing for the USA Baseball Collegiate National Team. As a junior in 2020, he went 2–0 with a 2.31 ERA over four starts, striking out 34 over 23 1/3 innings before the college baseball season was cut short due to the COVID-19 pandemic.

== Professional career ==
=== Los Angeles Dodgers ===
The Los Angeles Dodgers selected Miller in the first round, with the 29th overall pick, in the 2020 Major League Baseball draft. He signed with the Dodgers for a $2.2 million signing bonus. He did not play a minor league game in 2020 due to the cancellation of the minor league season caused by the pandemic.

Miller made his professional debut as the starting pitcher on Opening Day in 2021 for the Great Lakes Loons of the High-A Central, striking out five batters over three innings while allowing only two singles and a walk. On July 24, Miller pitched five innings of a combined no-hitter against the Lake County Captains alongside Clayton Beeter, Jake Cantleberry, and Cameron Gibbens. Miller appeared in 14 games (11 starts) for the Loons, compiling a 2–2 record and 3.06 ERA while striking out 56 over 46 innings. On September 8, he was promoted to the Tulsa Drillers of the Double-A Central, and pitched 9 1/3 innings for them to end the season. He was selected to play in the Arizona Fall League for the Glendale Desert Dogs after the season where he was named to the Fall Stars Game. He returned to Tulsa to begin the 2022 season, where he made 19 starts and went 6–6 with a 4.45 ERA and 117 strikeouts over 91 innings and was selected to represent the Dodgers at the 2022 All-Star Futures Game. Miller was promoted to the Oklahoma City Dodgers of the Triple-A Pacific Coast League on August 15. He made four starts for Oklahoma City, with a 1–1 record and 3.38 ERA.

Miller reported to spring training with a sore shoulder in 2023, leading to him missing the Cactus League schedule and getting a late start on the season, not joining Oklahoma City until the end of April. After his fourth Triple-A start of the season, Miller had his contract purchased by Los Angeles and was called up to the majors to start against the Atlanta Braves on May 23. In his debut, he picked up the win while allowing one run on four hits and one walk with five strikeouts. His first MLB strikeout was against Sam Hilliard. He remained in the starting rotation the rest of the season, making 22 starts, with a 11–4 record, 3.76 ERA and 119 strikeouts. Miller started the second game of the 2023 National League Division Series but struggled with his command, allowing three runs on four hits and two walks in only 1 2/3 innings.

Miller began the 2024 season in the Dodgers starting rotation, striking out a career high 11 batters in his season debut on March 29 against the St. Louis Cardinals. However, he struggled in his next two starts, allowing seven runs in only 5 2/3 innings, and was placed on the injured list with shoulder inflammation on April 14. He returned on June 19 and was able to pitch into the seventh inning to offer some encouragement. However, his following outings were not as promising and after he allowed a career worst nine runs in four innings against the Philadelphia Phillies on July 9, he was optioned to the minor leagues. Miller rejoined the Dodgers on August 17 after injuries had depleted their starting rotation. He continued to struggle and after he could not get past the second inning against the Miami Marlins on September 17, he was again optioned to the minors. He made 13 total starts for the Dodgers, with a 2–4 record and 8.52 ERA with 30 walks. In six starts in the minors for Oklahoma City, he allowed 15 earned runs in 26 2/3 innings.

Miller was hit in the head with a line-drive in his first spring training appearance, which slowed his performance, and he was returned to Oklahoma City to start the 2025 season. He made one spot start for the Dodgers on April 16 but gave up six runs on eight hits (including two home runs) in three innings. After 14 starts in the minors, where he struggled with his command and walked almost as many as he struck out, the Dodgers made the decision to switch him into a relief role. In total, he appeared in 35 games for Oklahoma City, with a 3–6 record, 5.66 ERA, 83 strikeouts and 61 walks. He also got one more appearance in the majors that season, allowing one run in two innings as a reliever on May 24.

Miller began the 2026 season on the 60-day injured list due to a right shoulder injury. He was activated on September 5 and made three spot appearances for the Dodgers down the stretch, allowing three runs on five hits in 7 1/3 innings. He also appeared in nine games in Oklahoma City, allowing 11 runs on 15 hits in 17 1/3 innings for a 5.71 ERA.

=== Minnesota Twins ===
On November 20, 2026, Miller and Francisco Espinoza were traded to the Minnesota Twins in exchange for Royce Lewis.

== Personal life ==
Miller grew up a Chicago Cubs fan.
