= Wonder Lake (CDP), Illinois =

Wonder Lake
- Neighborhood of Wonder Lake, Illinois former census designated place
- Location within the state of Illinois
- Coordinates: 42°23′4″N 88°20′58″W
- Country: United States
- State: Illinois
- County: McHenry

Area
  - Total: 7.2 sq mi (18.7 km^{2})
  - Land: 6.3 sq mi (16.2 km^{2})
  - Water: 0.97 sq mi (2.5 km^{2})

Population (2000)
  - Total: 7,463
  - Density: 1,190/sq mi (461/km^{2})
- Time zone: UTC-6 (Central (CST))
  - Summer (DST): UTC-5 (CDT)

Wonder Lake is a former census-designated place (CDP) in McHenry County, Illinois, United States. The population was 7,463 at the 2000 census. The CDP has been annexed by the village of Wonder Lake.

== Geography ==
Wonder Lake is located at 42°23′4″N 88°20′58″W (42.384504, -88.349505).

According to the United States Census Bureau, the CDP has a total area of 7.2 square miles (18.7 km^{2}), of which 6.2 square miles (16.2 km^{2}) of it is land and 1.0 square miles (2.5 km^{2}) of it (13.45%) is water.

== Demographics ==
As of the census of 2000, there were 7,463 people, 2,674 households, and 1,986 families residing in the CDP. The population density was 1,194.6 inhabitants per square mile (461.2/km^{2}). There were 2,997 housing units at an average density of 479.7 per square mile (185.2/km^{2}). The racial makeup of the CDP was 96.22% White, 0.28% Black or African American, 0.21% Native American, 0.59% Asian, 1.38% from other races, and 1.31% from two or more races. Hispanic or Latino of any race were 5.09% of the population.

There were 2,674 households, out of which 40.5% had children under the age of 18 living with them, 60.6% were married couples living together, 8.9% had a female householder with no husband present, and 25.7% were non-families. 19.5% of all households were made up of individuals, and 5.2% had someone living alone who was 65 years of age or older. The average household size was 2.79 and the average family size was 3.23.

In the CDP, the population was spread out, with 29.0% under the age of 18, 7.9% from 18 to 24, 35.1% from 25 to 44, 20.0% from 45 to 64, and 8.0% who were 65 years of age or older. The median age was 34 years. For every 100 females, there were 106.2 males. For every 100 females age 18 and over, there were 102.8 males.

The median income for a household in the CDP was $51,698, and the median income for a family was $56,705. Males had a median income of $38,984 versus $26,597 for females. The per capita income for the CDP was $21,352. About 0.8% of families and 3.4% of the population were below the poverty line, including 3.2% of those under age 18 and 4.2% of those age 65 or over.
