= Harrison School District =

Harrison School District can refer to:

- Harrison Central School District (Harrison, New York)
- Harrison Public Schools (Harrison, New Jersey)
- Harrison School District (Harrison, Arkansas)
- Harrison School District 2 (Colorado Springs, Colorado)
- Harrison School District 36 (Wonder Lake, Illinois)
