= Harrison School District 36 =

School district in Illinois, United States

Address
- 6809 McCullom Lake Road Wonder Lake, Illinois, 60097; United States
- Coordinates: 42.385°N 88.331°W

District information
- Type: Public
- Grades: Pre-K to 8
- Established: 1854; 172 years ago
- Superintendent: Susan Wings
- NCES District ID: 1718360

Students and staff
- Enrollment: 376 (2020-2021)
- Faculty: 36.0 (on an FTE basis)
- Student–teacher ratio: 17.1
- District mascot: Hurricanes
- Colors: Blue and Gold

Other information
- Website: www.hsd36.org

Harrison School District 36 is a school district located in Wonder Lake, Illinois, United States. The district operates one school, educating about 400 students from Kindergarten to grade 8.
