= Bull Valley, Illinois =

Bull Valley
- Village
- Village of Bull Valley
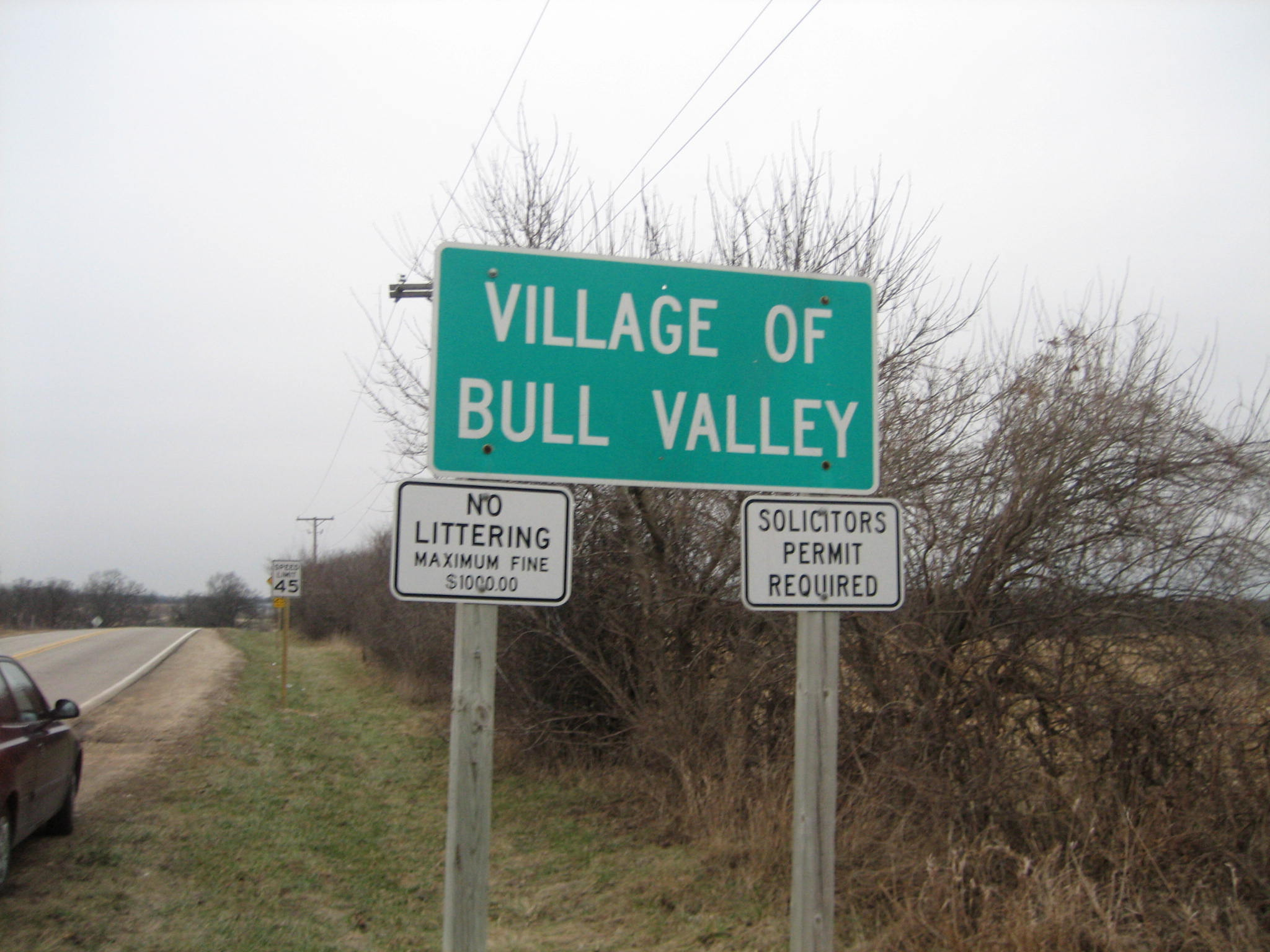
- Sign leading into Bull Valley.

- Location of Bull Valley in McHenry County, Illinois.
- Coordinates: 42°19′10″N 88°22′21″W
- Country: United States
- State: Illinois
- County: McHenry
- Township: Nunda, McHenry, Greenwood, Dorr

Area
  - Total: 9.17 sq mi (23.76 km^{2})
  - Land: 9.14 sq mi (23.66 km^{2})
  - Water: 0.039 sq mi (0.10 km^{2})
- Elevation: 942 ft (287 m)

Population (2020)
  - Total: 1,128
  - Density: 123.5/sq mi (47.67/km^{2})
- Time zone: UTC-6 (CST)
  - Summer (DST): UTC-5 (CDT)
- Zip code: 60012,60098
- Area code: 815
- FIPS code: 17-09531
- GNIS feature ID: 2397492
- Website: http://www.thevillageofbullvalley.com/

Bull Valley is a village in McHenry County, Illinois, United States. The population was 1,128 at the 2020 census. Surrounded by the larger exurb towns of Crystal Lake, Woodstock, and McHenry, the village prides itself in its rural, low-density character. The village is in the outermost ring of the Chicago suburbs.

== History ==
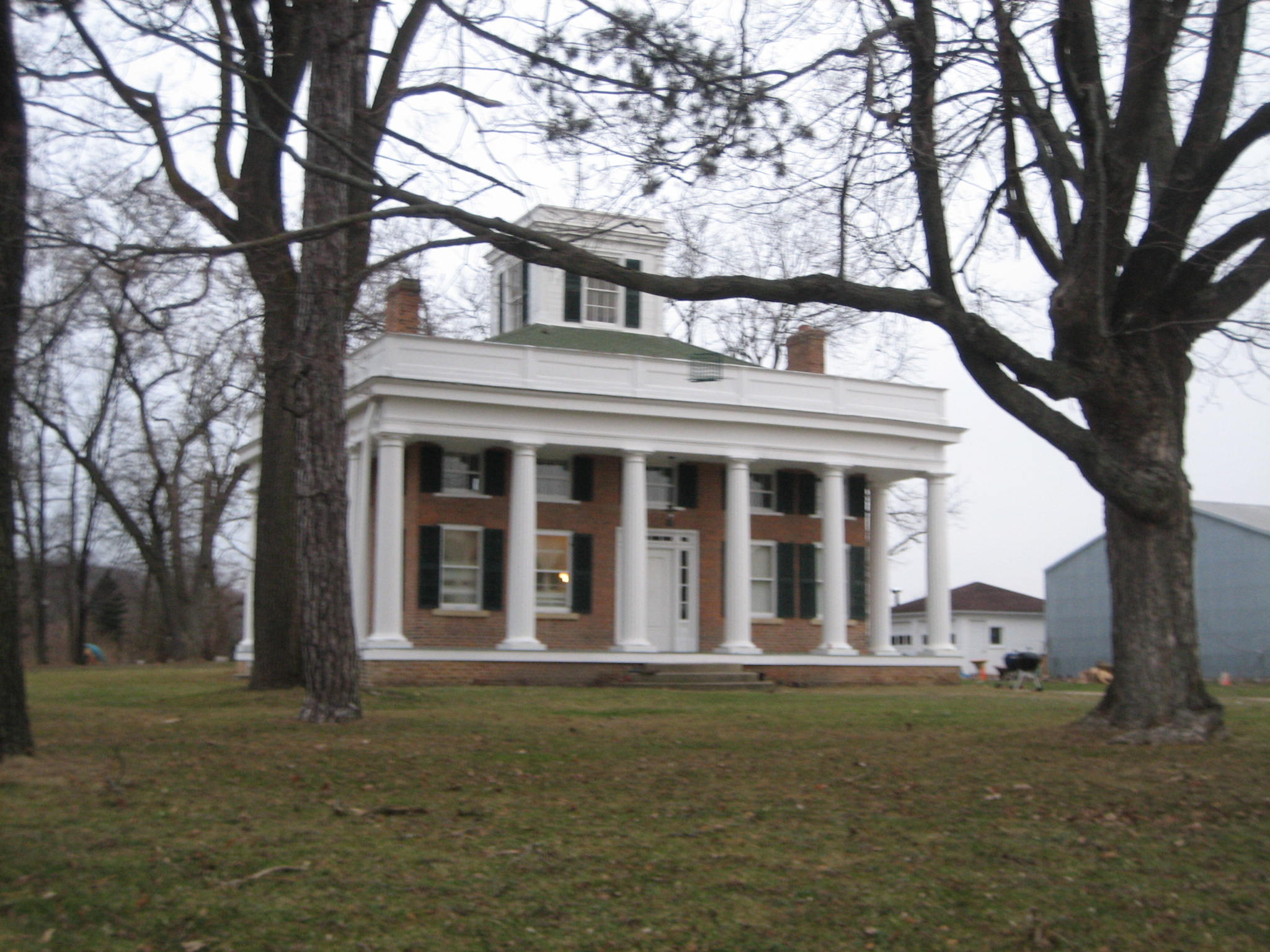
The Terwilliger House in Bull Valley.

In 1942, a group of neighbors organized the Countryside Improvement Association. It gradually became involved in questions of land use, and in 1955, in an unprecedented action, owners of about 3,000 acres, half of the Bull Valley area at the time, voluntarily put their land into 3-acre zoning, the highest residential classification then offered by the county. This single decision would establish the future character of the community.

In 1960, money was raised from residents by subscription to pay for a land use study and professional planning advice. The Eastern McHenry County Plan Association (EMCPA) was then formed to address the common problems of four townships. That Association's recommendation in a report of July 25, 1961, was that a large part of the Bull Valley area be zoned for a residential/estate use of a minimum of 5-acre tracts. "Unlike the traditional concept of a community where the most intense use is at the center of the area and becomes more open as the distance from the center increases, the EMCPA area has at its center, a very attractive rolling, wooded area currently developed in low density, open estate type residential and farm development (and) included in this center portion are two very broad, scenic valleys which should be retained for non-intensive development." When McHenry County established a Planning Commission in 1963, the EMCPA dissolved and turned its studies over to the County Planning Commission.

As the county began to consider land use policy, Bull Valley residents continued to oppose development that threatened the farms, forested hills, and wetlands. Through their association, they bore the costs of legal representation at numerous zoning hearings, until it became obvious that private efforts could not win the fight to save the rural character of the land.

In 1977, the Countryside Improvement Association was reorganized as the Bull Valley Association, which initiated and campaigned for a referendum on incorporation. The referendum passed at an election held on July 23, 1977, giving residents for the first time, the authority to implement their long-standing purposes. Because state law required that a new municipality could have no fewer than 200 voters in an area of two square miles, the Village had to reach out for scattered households, hence its peculiar shape and boundaries.

In the early years of the village, there was nearly no government infrastructure. Later, a small tax was assessed to provide for simple road repairs. By the 1980s, the village had hired a police officer part-time who shared time with the neighboring village of Prairie Grove.

=== The village today ===
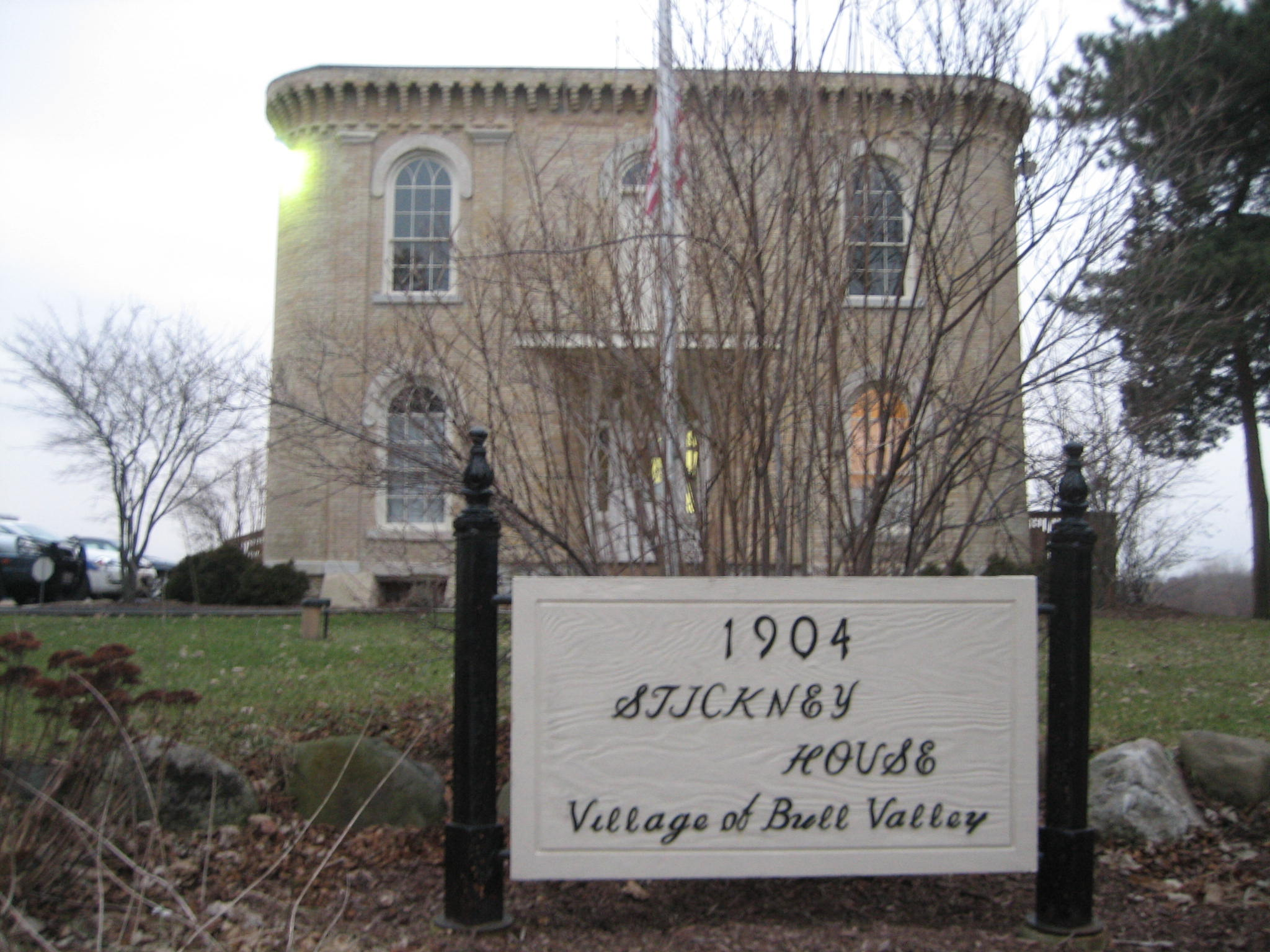
The George Stickney House in Bull Valley.

Today the Village government occupies Stickney House, one of the oldest brick buildings in the area. This house was originally built without any corners due to the belief of the Stickneys that evil spirits could live in corners. While the village has grown, and even includes some subdivisions now, it remains rural, with areas of woods, farms, and low-density housing between larger, exurb towns of Crystal Lake, Woodstock, and McHenry.

== Geography ==
According to the 2010 census, Bull Valley has a total area of 8.761 square miles (22.69 km^{2}), of which 8.75 square miles (22.66 km^{2}) (or 99.87%) is land and 0.011 square miles (0.03 km^{2}) (or 0.13%) is water.

=== Major streets ===
- Illinois Route 120
- Greenwood Road
- Thompson Road
- Fleming Road
- Ridge Road
- Valley Hill Road
- Bull Valley Road
- Country Club Road
- Crystal Springs Road
- Crystal Lake Road
- Cold Springs Road
- Queen Anne Road
- Draper Road
- Cherry Valley Road
- Mason Hill Road

== Demographics ==
Historical population
Census	Pop.	Note	%±
1980	509		—
1990	574		12.8%
2000	726		26.5%
2010	1,077		48.3%
2020	1,128		4.7%
U.S. Decennial Census

=== Racial and ethnic composition ===
Bull Valley village, Illinois – Racial and ethnic composition Note: the US Census treats Hispanic/Latino as an ethnic category. This table excludes Latinos from the racial categories and assigns them to a separate category. Hispanics/Latinos may be of any race.
Race / Ethnicity (NH = Non-Hispanic)	Pop 2000	Pop 2010	Pop 2020	% 2000	% 2010	% 2020
White alone (NH)	687	983	1,002	94.63%	91.27%	88.83%
Black or African American alone (NH)	4	9	2	0.55%	0.84%	0.18%
Native American or Alaska Native alone (NH)	0	0	2	0.00%	0.00%	0.18%
Asian alone (NH)	8	31	17	1.10%	2.88%	1.51%
Pacific Islander alone (NH)	1	0	0	0.14%	0.00%	0.00%
Other race alone (NH)	4	0	1	0.55%	0.00%	0.09%
Mixed race or Multiracial (NH)	6	11	46	0.83%	1.02%	4.08%
Hispanic or Latino (any race)	16	43	58	2.20%	3.99%	5.14%
Total	726	1,077	1,128	100.00%	100.00%	100.00%

=== 2020 census ===
As of the 2020 census, Bull Valley had a population of 1,128. The median age was 54.9 years. 15.2% of residents were under the age of 18 and 27.3% of residents were 65 years of age or older. For every 100 females, there were 105.5 males, and for every 100 females age 18 and over, there were 108.7 males age 18 and over.

0.8% of residents lived in urban areas, while 99.2% lived in rural areas.

There were 437 households in Bull Valley, of which 25.9% had children under the age of 18 living in them. Of all households, 73.7% were married-couple households, 13.3% were households with a male householder and no spouse or partner present, and 9.8% were households with a female householder and no spouse or partner present. About 11.9% of all households were made up of individuals and 3.9% had someone living alone who was 65 years of age or older.

There were 478 housing units, of which 8.6% were vacant. The homeowner vacancy rate was 2.9% and the rental vacancy rate was 19.4%.

=== 2000 census ===
At the 2000 census, there were 726 people, 268 households and 217 families residing in the village. The population density was 129.4 inhabitants per square mile (50.0/km^{2}). There were 281 housing units at an average density of 50.1 per square mile (19.3/km^{2}). The racial makeup of the village was 96.69% White, 0.55% African American, 1.10% Asian, 0.14% Pacific Islander, 0.69% from other races, and 0.83% from two or more races. Hispanic or Latino of any race were 2.20% of the population.

There were 268 households, of which 28.7% had children under the age of 18 living with them, 76.9% were married couples living together, 3.4% had a female householder with no husband present, and 19.0% were non-families. 15.3% of all households were made up of individuals, and 8.6% had someone living alone who was 65 years of age or older. The average household size was 2.71 and the average family size was 3.04.

Age distribution was 25.1% under the age of 18, 4.5% from 18 to 24, 19.3% from 25 to 44, 35.7% from 45 to 64, and 15.4% who were 65 years of age or older. The median age was 46 years. For every 100 females, there were 85.7 males. For every 100 females age 18 and over, there were 88.2 males.

The median household income was $102,693, and the median family income was $109,147. Males had a median income of $73,750 versus $37,188 for females. The per capita income for the village was $54,022. About 1.4% of families and 2.3% of the population were below the poverty line, including 3.1% of those under age 18 and 6.6% of those age 65 or over.

== Notable people ==
- Chester Gould, cartoonist, creator of the Dick Tracy comic strip
- John H. Johnson, founder of the Johnson Publishing Company

== See also ==
- George Stickney House
- Terwilliger House
- Barrington Hills, Illinois - A nearby village that also takes pride in its low-density, rural character.
- Wayne, Illinois - A Kane County/Dupage County village with similar demographics and a low-density, rural equestrian environment adjacent to a larger town.
