= Robert Tonyan =

American football player (born 1994)

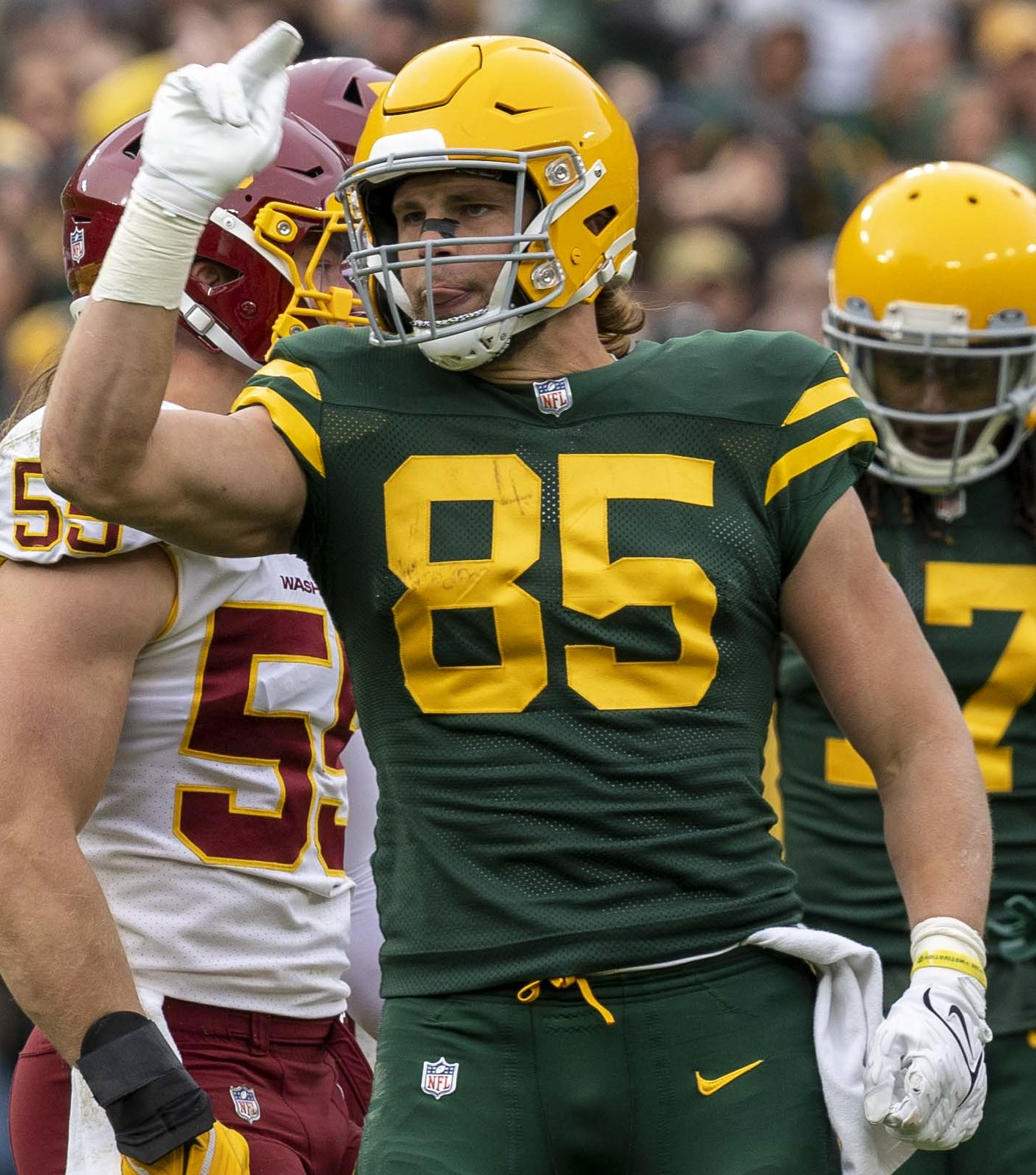
- Tonyan with the Green Bay Packers in 2021

No. 85 – Pittsburgh Steelers
- Position: Tight end
- Roster status: Active

Personal information
- Born: April 30, 1994 (age 32); McHenry, Illinois, U.S.
- Listed height: 6 ft 5 in (1.96 m)
- Listed weight: 240 lb (109 kg)

Career information
- High school: McHenry East
- College: Indiana State (2012–2016)
- NFL draft: 2017: undrafted

Career history
- Detroit Lions (2017)*; Green Bay Packers (2017–2022); Chicago Bears (2023); Minnesota Vikings (2024); Kansas City Chiefs (2024–2025); Pittsburgh Steelers (2026–present)
- * Offseason or practice squad member only

Career NFL statistics as of Week 7, 2026
- Receptions: 150
- Receiving yards: 1,552
- Receiving touchdowns: 17
- Stats at Pro Football Reference

Robert Joseph Tonyan Jr. (/tʌnjən/ TUN-yən; born April 30, 1994) is an American professional football tight end for the Pittsburgh Steelers of the National Football League (NFL). He played college football for the Indiana State Sycamores, and signed with the Detroit Lions as an undrafted free agent in 2017. Tonyan played for the Green Bay Packers for five seasons from 2018 to 2022 and has also played for the Chicago Bears, Minnesota Vikings, and Kansas City Chiefs.

== Early life ==
Tonyan attended McHenry Community High School – East Campus. He lettered twice in basketball and football. As a quarterback, he was named all-conference as a junior and senior, and set the school record with 5,000 career passing yards.

== College career ==
Tonyan enrolled at Indiana State in 2012, and started for four years after redshirting his first year. He appeared in 11 games in 2013, starting three as a quarterback. His first career completion was a 57-yard touchdown, and he completed 35 of 102 passes for 348 yards and three touchdowns. His second year, he moved to wide receiver, where he caught 54 passes for 747 yards (6th in school history) and four touchdowns, including a career-high 172 yards in the last game of the season (seventh in school history). In his 2015 junior season, Tonyan had 40 receptions for 601 yards (fourteenth in school history) and six touchdowns despite starting just six of 11 games, which earned him an honorable mention on the All-Missouri Valley Football Conference team. As a fifth-year senior, Tonyan had 56 receptions for 699 yards (ninth all-time) and a school-record ten touchdowns. He set several career records for the Sycamores, including 20 touchdown receptions, 21 consecutive games with a reception, two games with three receiving touchdowns, and was second all-time to Sam Logan with 150 receptions and 2,047 yards.

== Professional career ==
Pre-draft measurables
Height	Weight	Arm length	Hand span	Wingspan	40-yard dash	10-yard split	20-yard split	20-yard shuttle	Three-cone drill	Vertical jump	Broad jump	Bench press
6 ft 4 5/8 in (1.95 m)	236 lb (107 kg)	32 1/2 in (0.83 m)	10 1/4 in (0.26 m)	6 ft 5 1/4 in (1.96 m)	4.58 s	1.53 s	2.60 s	4.34 s	7.12 s	35.0 in (0.89 m)	10 ft 5 in (3.18 m)	16 reps
All values from Indiana State's Pro Day

=== Detroit Lions ===
On May 12, 2017, the Detroit Lions signed Tonyan to a three-year, $1.66 million contract as an undrafted free agent. His signing made him the tenth Indiana State football player to reach the NFL. He was released before the season began.

=== Green Bay Packers ===
Tonyan was signed to the practice squad of the Green Bay Packers for the final four games of the 2017 season, and was re-signed for the 2018 season. He appeared in the first nine games of the season, but was targeted just once before his first NFL reception, a 54-yard touchdown from Aaron Rodgers against the Seattle Seahawks in Week 11. He totaled four receptions for 77 receiving yards and one touchdown on the 2018 season.

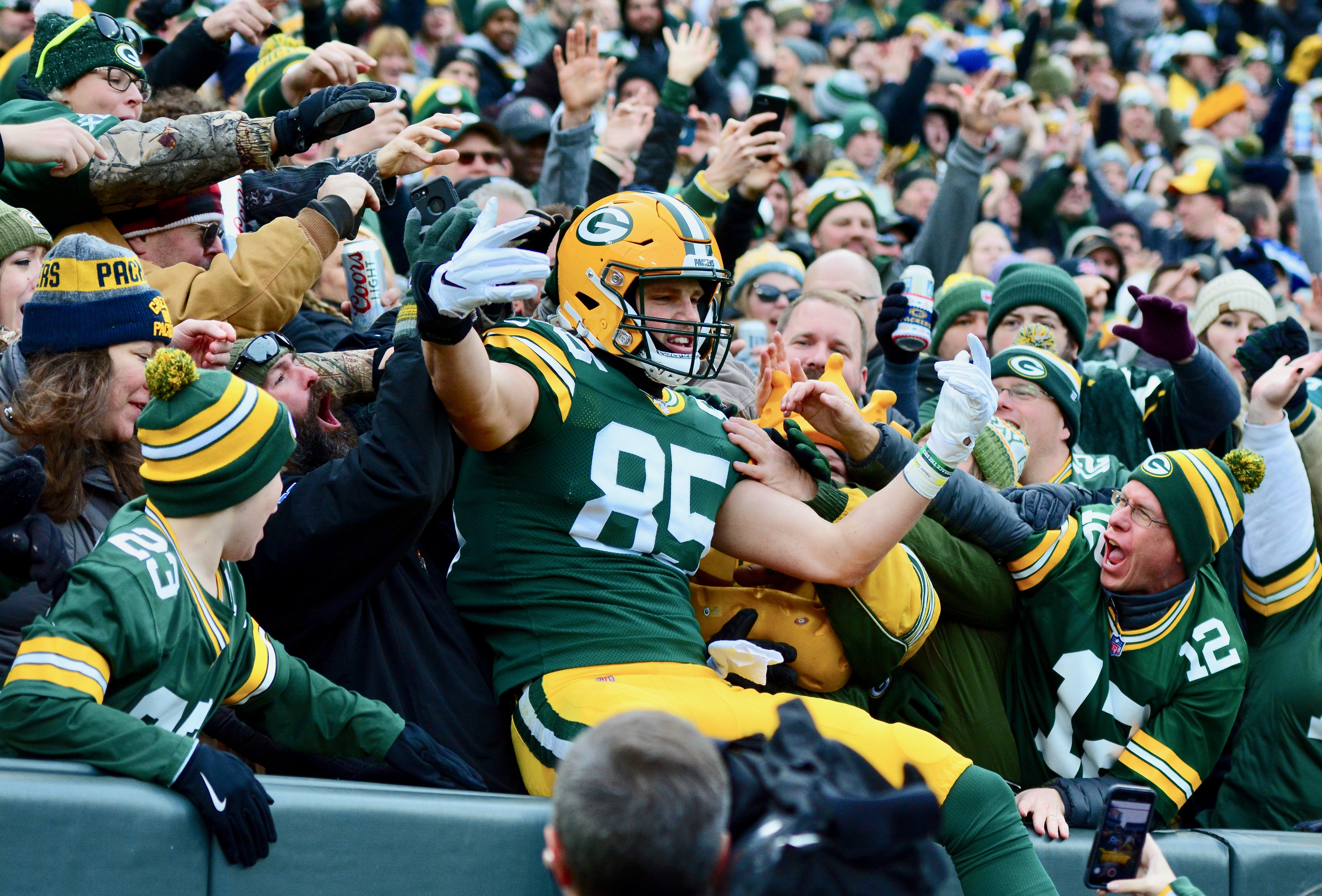
Tonyan in 2019, celebrating a touchdown with a Lambeau Leap

In 2019, the Packers tendered exclusive rights to Tonyan. On December 8, 2019, Tonyan caught a 12-yard pass for a touchdown in a 20–15 win over the Washington Redskins. He totaled ten receptions for 100 receiving yards on the 2019 season.

On April 24, 2020, the Packers re-signed Tonyan as an exclusive-rights free agent, putting him under contract in Green Bay for another year. On September 20, 2020, Tonyan caught an 11-yard touchdown pass in a 42–21 win over the Lions in Week 2. In a nationally televised Monday Night Football game on October 5, 2020, Tonyan caught six passes for 98 yards, including three touchdown passes, to lead the Packers over the Atlanta Falcons 30–16. He finished the 2020 season with 52 receptions for 586 yards and 11 touchdowns. His 11 receiving touchdowns tied with Travis Kelce for the league lead among tight ends. In the NFC Championship against the Tampa Bay Buccaneers, Tonyan recorded four catches for 22 yards and a touchdown during the 31–26 loss.

The Packers placed a second-round restricted free agent tender on Tonyan on March 17, 2021. On May 27, Tonyan signed his tender worth $3.4 million. On October 28, 2021, Tonyan tore the ACL in his left knee during the Packers week 8 game against the Arizona Cardinals, forcing him to miss the remainder of the 2021 season. He was placed on injured reserve on November 1, 2021. He finished the 2021 season with 18 receptions for 204 yards and two touchdowns.

On March 20, 2022, Tonyan re-signed with the Packers on a one-year contract. He finished the 2022 season with 53 receptions for 470 yards and two touchdowns.

=== Chicago Bears ===
On March 16, 2023, Tonyan signed a one-year deal with the Chicago Bears. He played in all 17 games for the Bears and caught 11 passes for 112 yards.

=== Minnesota Vikings ===
On May 16, 2024, Tonyan signed with the Minnesota Vikings. He was released on August 27, 2024, and re-signed to the practice squad. When he did he completed the cycle of signing with one whole division, the NFC North. He was promoted to the active roster on October 3, 2024. After playing in four games, recording no statistics, he was released from the team on October 22, 2024, in favor of signing linebacker Bo Richter. He was subsequently re-signed to the practice squad. He was released on November 29, 2024.

=== Kansas City Chiefs ===
On December 23, 2024, Tonyan was signed to the Kansas City Chiefs practice squad.

On March 11, 2025, Tonyan re-signed with the Chiefs. He was released on August 26 as part of final roster cuts and re-signed with the Chiefs practice squad on August 28. He was promoted to the active roster the next day upon the suspension of Rashee Rice.

=== Pittsburgh Steelers ===
Tonyan (85) with the Steelers in 2026

On June 4, 2026, Tonyan signed a one-year contract with the Pittsburgh Steelers.

== NFL career statistics ==
Legend
**Bold**	Career high

=== Regular season ===
Year	Team	Games		Receiving					Fumbles	
Year	Team	GP	GS	Rec	Yds	Avg	Lng	TD	Fum	Lost
2018	GB	16	1	4	77	**19.3**	**54T**	1	0	0
2019	GB	11	1	10	100	10.0	28	1	0	0
2020	GB	16	8	52	**586**	11.3	45	**11**	0	0
2021	GB	8	5	18	204	11.3	33	2	0	0
2022	GB	17	3	**53**	470	8.9	24	2	0	0
2023	CHI	17	6	11	112	10.2	24	0	0	0
2024	MIN	5	0	0	0	0.0	0	0	0	0
2025	KC	17	0	1	1	1.0	1	0	0	0
2026	PIT	7	0	1	2	2.0	2	0	0	0
Total		114	24	150	1,552	10.3	54T	17	0	0
Source: pro-football-reference.com

=== Postseason ===
Year	Team	Games		Receiving					Fumbles	
Year	Team	GP	GS	Rec	Yds	Avg	Lng	TD	Fum	Lost
2019	GB	2	0	0	0	0.0	0	0	0	0
2020	GB	2	0	**8**	**82**	**10.3**	**33**	**1**	0	0
Total		4	0	8	82	10.3	33	1	0	0
Source: pro-football-reference.com
