= McHenry East High School =

Location
- 1012 North Green Street; McHenry, Illinois 60050; United States; 42°20′32″N 88°16′0″W

Information
- Type: Public
- Established: 1925
- School district: McHenry Community High School District 156
- Principal: Sean Sterner
- Grades: 9
  - Grade 9: 668 (2020-21)
- Colors: Orange; Black
- Website: http://www.dist156.org/east-campus.html

McHenry East High School was a 4-year public high school in McHenry, Illinois, United States, which served 9th-12th grade students until the 2021–2022 school year. Since then, the building is being used to serve only 9th grade students and was renamed to McHenry High School - Freshman Campus after minor renovations were completed to the building prior to the start of the 2020–21 school year.

== Notable alumni ==
- Robert Tonyan, professional American football player for the Chicago Bears.
- Thomas Roark, professional American football player, known throughout McHenry, Illinois for sprinting head-long into a wall and shattering his arm.
- Chuck Hiller, former Major League Baseball Player
