= George Stickney House =

Historic house in Illinois, United States

- U.S. National Register of Historic Places
- Location within Illinois Location within the United States
- Location: Bull Valley, McHenry County, Illinois
- Coordinates: 42°18′2.7684″N 88°21′8.3874″W
- Area: less than one acre
- Built: 1865
- Architectural style: Italianate
- NRHP reference No.: 79003115
- Added to NRHP: May 14, 1979

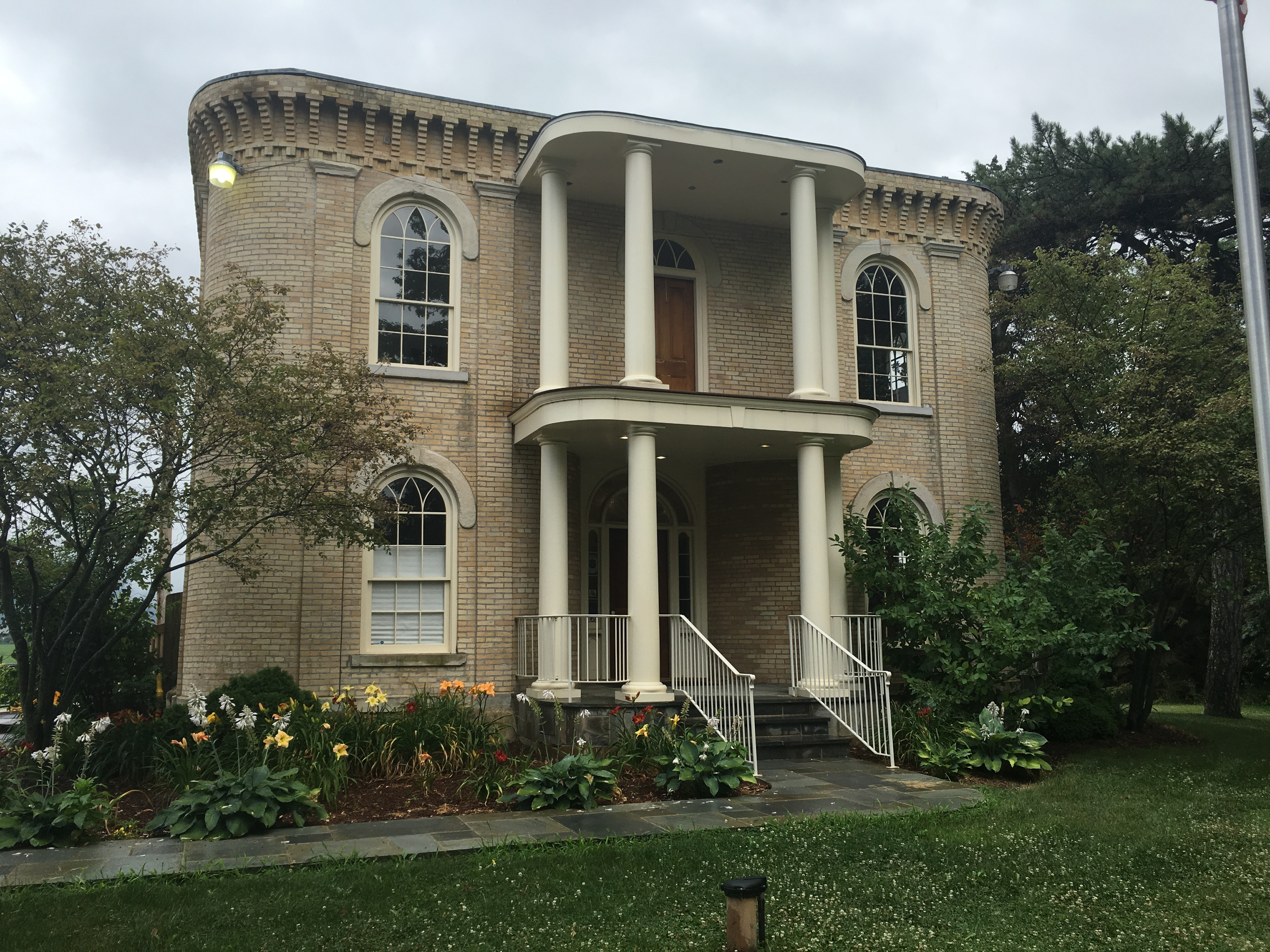
George Stickney House in 2016

The George Stickney House or simply Stickney House or Stickney Mansion is located in rural McHenry County, Illinois, in the small village of Bull Valley. The Stickney House is currently the Bull Valley Police Headquarters since 1985. The structure has been listed on the National Register of Historic Places since 1979. The house is widely considered bizarre due to its design, which was based, in part, on George and Sylvia Stickney's belief in Spiritualism. This house continues to be the subject of several ghostlore stories.

== George and Sylvia Stickney ==
George W. Stickney was born in 1809 in Jaffrey, New Hampshire and emigrated west in 1835. Stickney was the first settler of Nunda Township. Stickney built the first house (a log cabin) in the county and established himself as a farmer and fruit-grower in the area. Stickney was also a member of the group of men in charge of the government of the township.

Stickney married Sylvia Marilla Beckley (b. 1819) on 27 November, 1839. Beckley was born in Granby, Connectitut and was the daughter of fellow settlers Gordon Lewis Beckley and Phoebe Barnes.

The couple would go on to have ten children

Orange Harrison (b. 1840-d. 1841)

Adaline Lovina

Rosina Lovina b. 1843 -d.1843)

Edmund Marion (1844-1909)

Elllen Marilla , married Webster. P . Morse.

Caroline Levia

Jeanette A (b. 1851- d. 1937) , married Horace Greeley Drury.

Sylvia Adele

Phoebe Salona (b. 1857- d. 1868)

George and Sylvia Stickney built this English country house in 1865. They were said to have chosen such an isolated place for the peace and quiet and for their spiritualistic activities. Sylvia came from a family adhering to Universalism, and many members of this faith were attracted to spiritualism.

Both of the Stickney's were said to be accomplished mediums and they wanted to host parties and seances for their friends. The seclusion offered by the Illinois countryside made the perfect setting. The Stickneys may have drifted toward spiritualism as a way to communicate with their dead children; they had ten children but only three survived to adulthood. It is known that the family conducted seances on the second floor of the building, in Sylvia's ballroom. In the years since the house left the hands of the Stickney family, owners have reported supernatural occurrences.

Sylvia died in 1879, after which her widower married Lavina Congdon (b. 1812) in 1881.

== Architecture ==
The house itself was very unusual in its design. It has two stories, although the second floor was reserved for a ballroom that ran the entire length of the building. The house is actually very big for being built in the 1800s. Upstairs has two rooms, one with a bathroom, and down the hall is Sylvia's ballroom that has three more rooms connecting to it. During the Civil War, the house also served as quarters for Federal soldiers and was home to the first piano in McHenry County. The Stickneys insisted on adding distinctive features into the design of the house. These features, they assured the architect, would assist them when holding seances and gatherings at the property. They believed that spirits have a tendency to get stuck in 90 degree corners. It has also been suggested that the Stickneys believed that corners attracted the attention of evil spirits as well, a common belief in Spiritualist circles of the time. Therefore, the home's interior was designed with no 90 degree angles between the walls. Rumor has it that there is one 90 degree angle in the house, and this is also where George Stickney died. Not true, Richard confirmed that the house was searched and documented and there was no 90 degree angles found at the time of George's death. He also confirmed that George's death was never documented, so no one knows how he died.

== Ghostlore ==
Today the mansion is occupied by the Village of Bull Valley and its police department.

In 2005 Bull Valley Police Chief Norbert Sauers described his experiences with possible paranormal events in the Stickney Mansion. Sauers said that village employees have heard numerous sounds that seem to defy explanation. He described hearing footsteps in the second floor ballroom, a room that today is used only as storage for village records but was used for seances when the Stickneys owned the mansion. The footstep sounds have extended out onto the stairwell at times. Other occurrences include hearing human sounding noises or voices. They sometimes even hear the toilets flushing when they are alone in the house.

The Chief said he has also personally experienced objects moving around on his desk, lights turning off and, door knobs turning and a door opening, seemingly by themselves, and voices from thin air, having once heard a shout in his ear when no one was around him. Another police officer in Bull Valley claims to have come face to face with an apparition of Stickney's father-in-law.

== Photo gallery ==
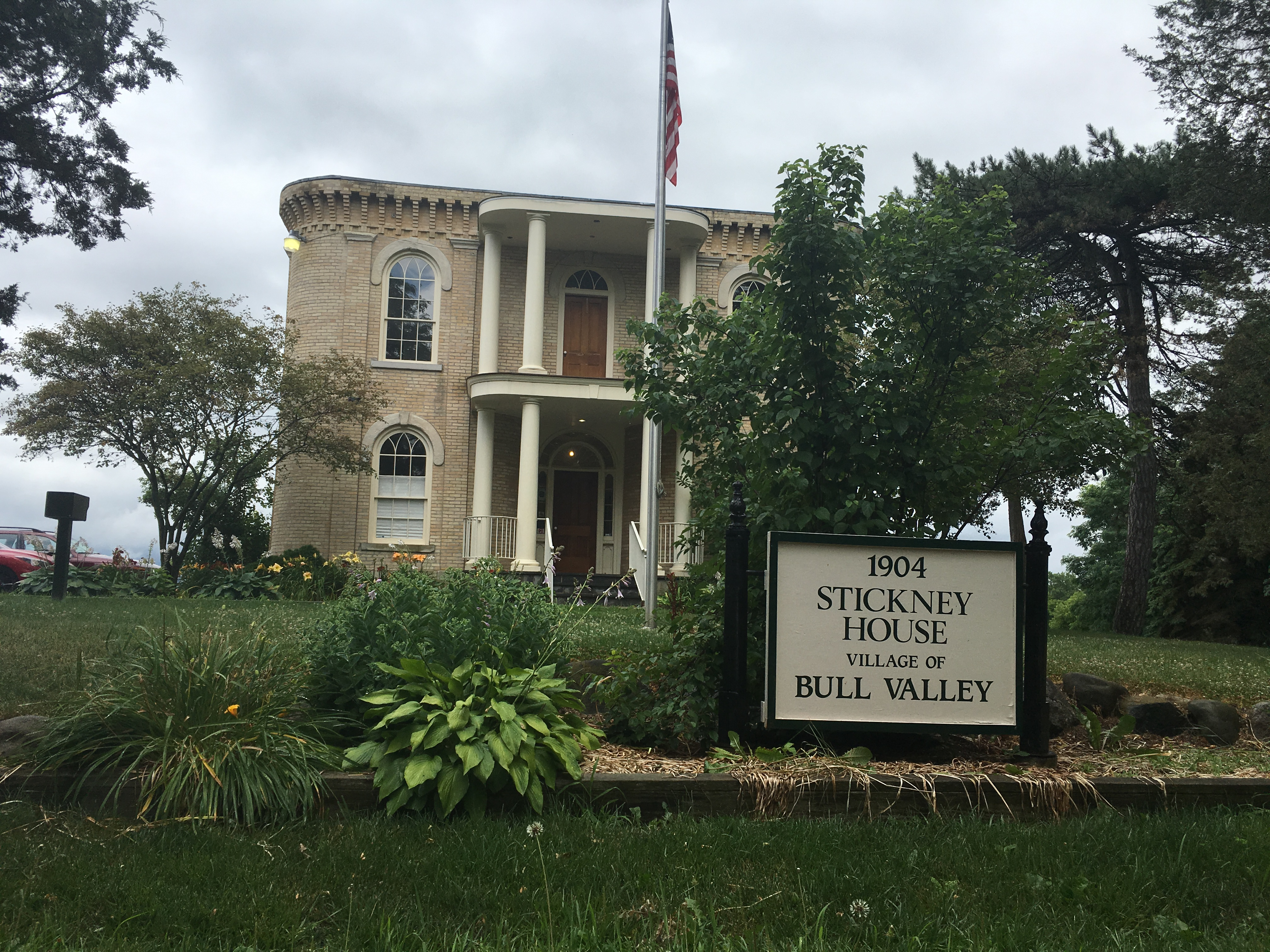
Stickney House

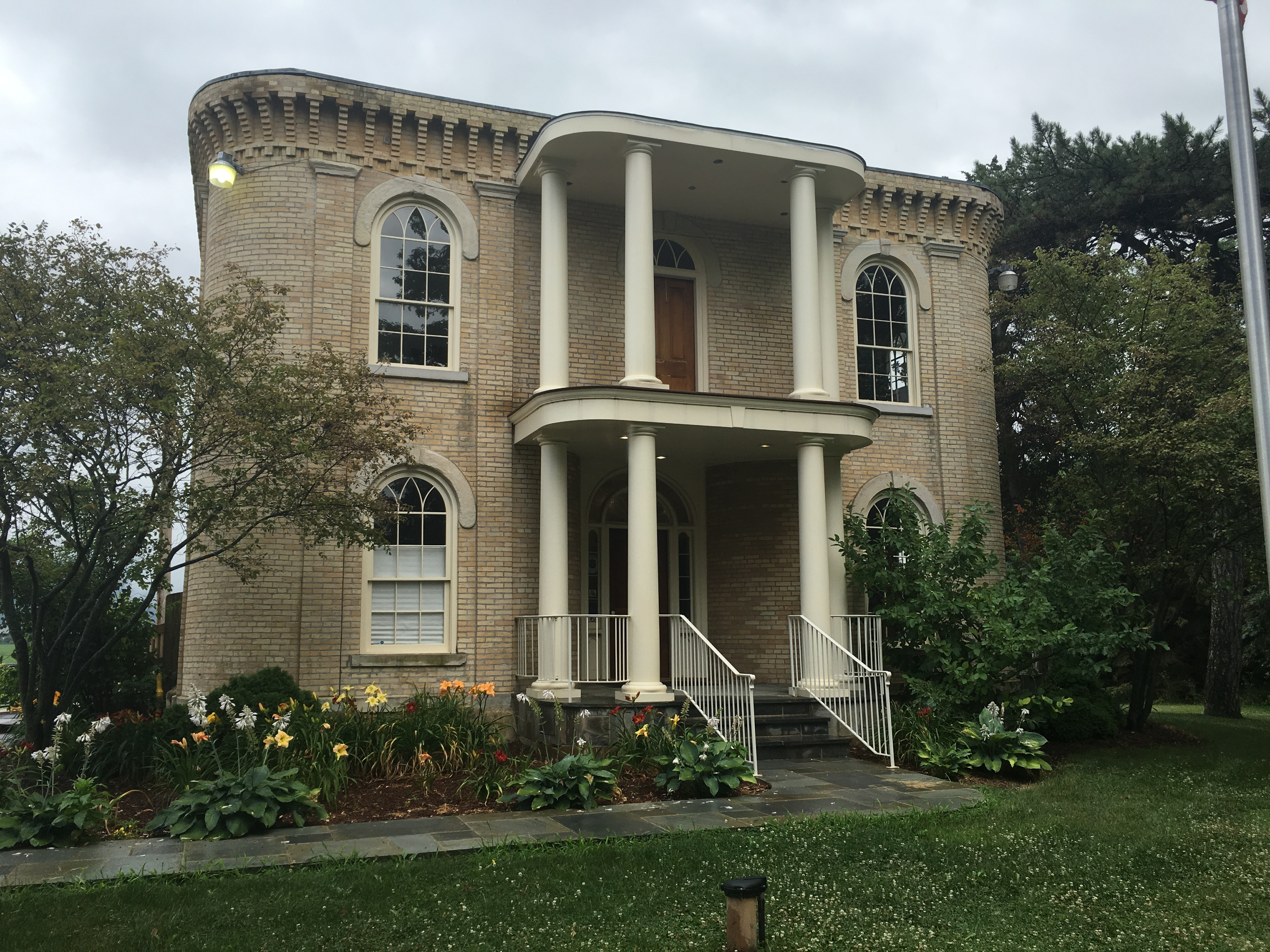
Stickney House 2016

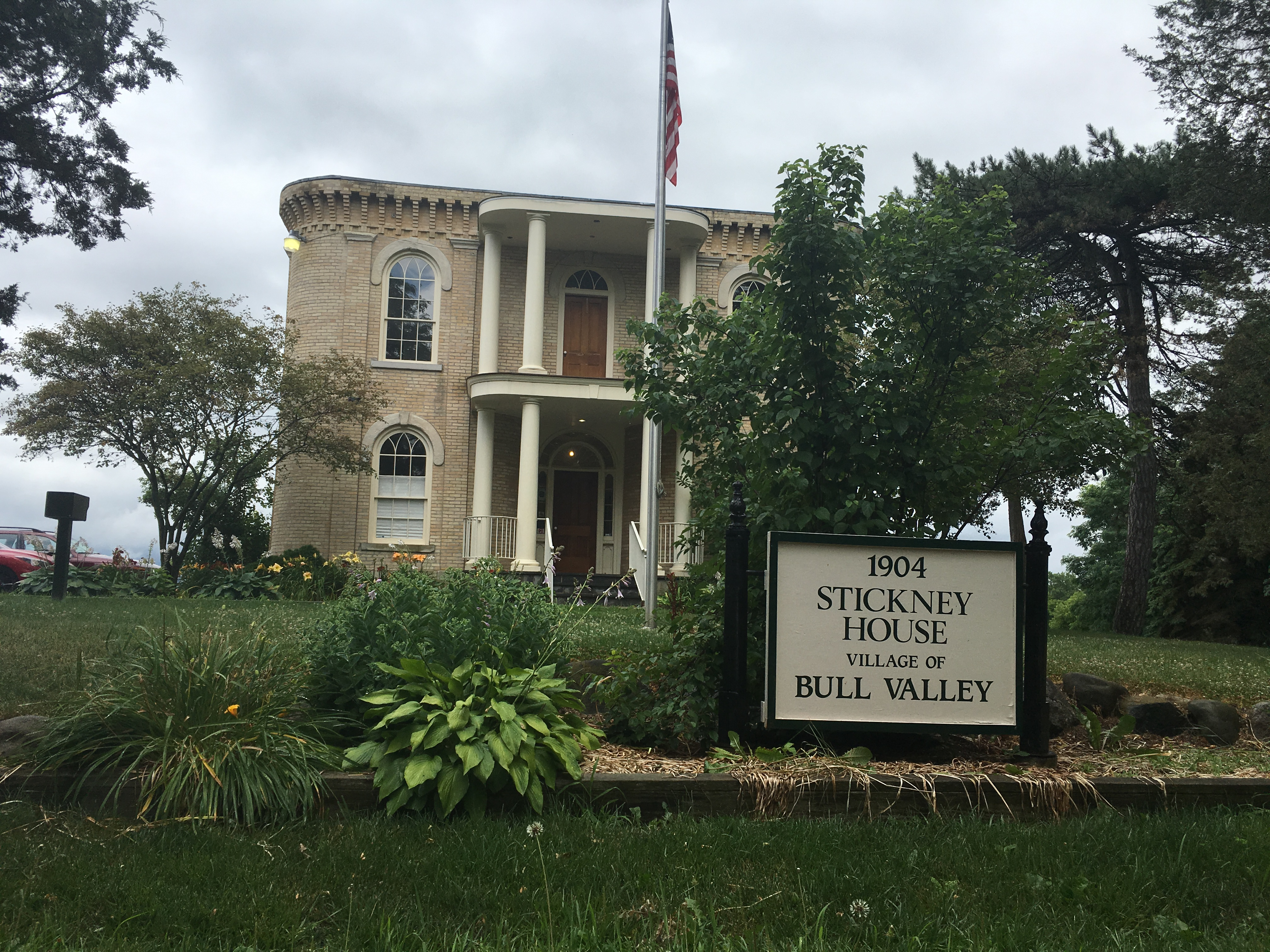
Stickney House 2016

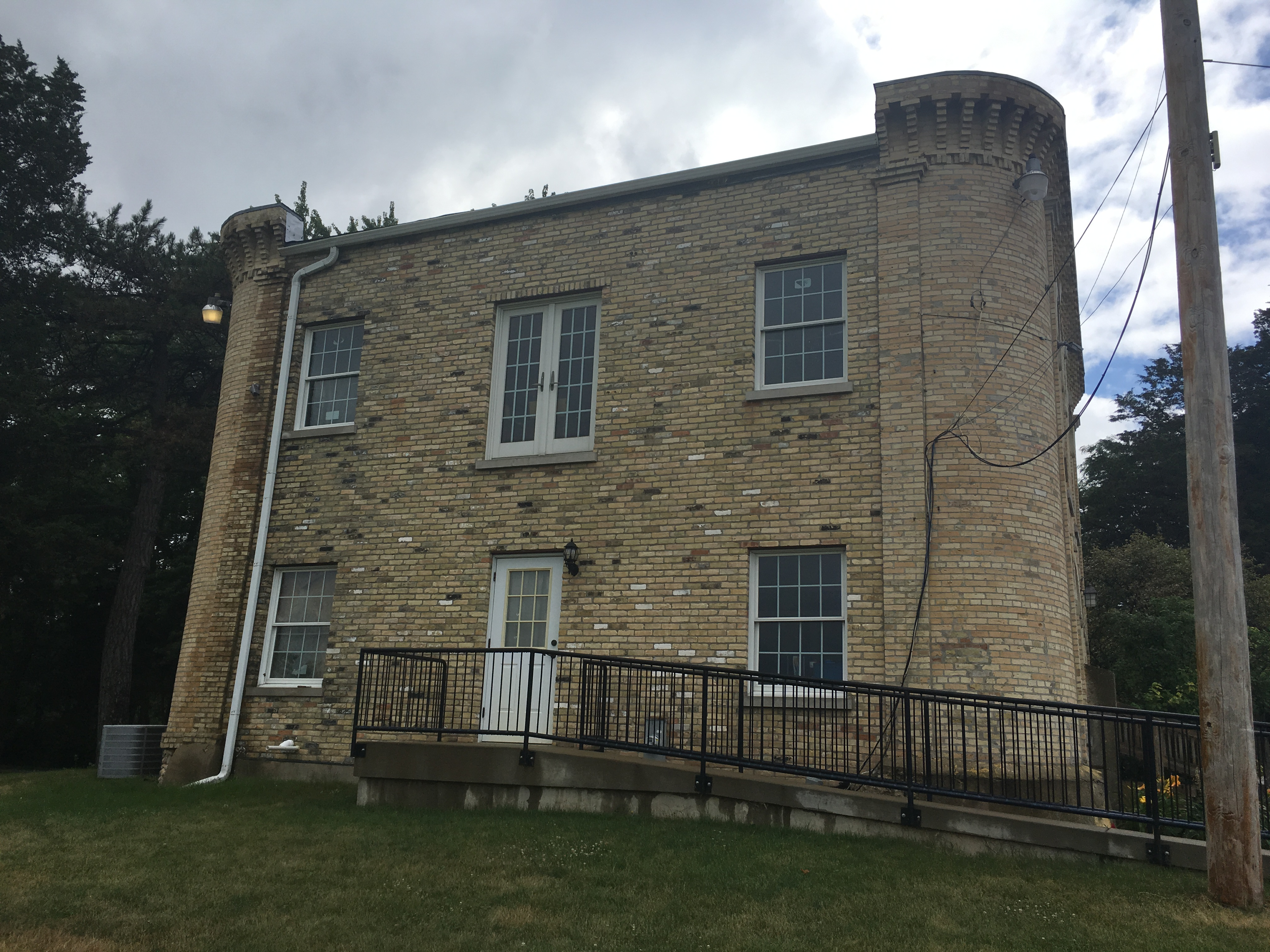
Back of the house, look at the rounded corners. (2016)

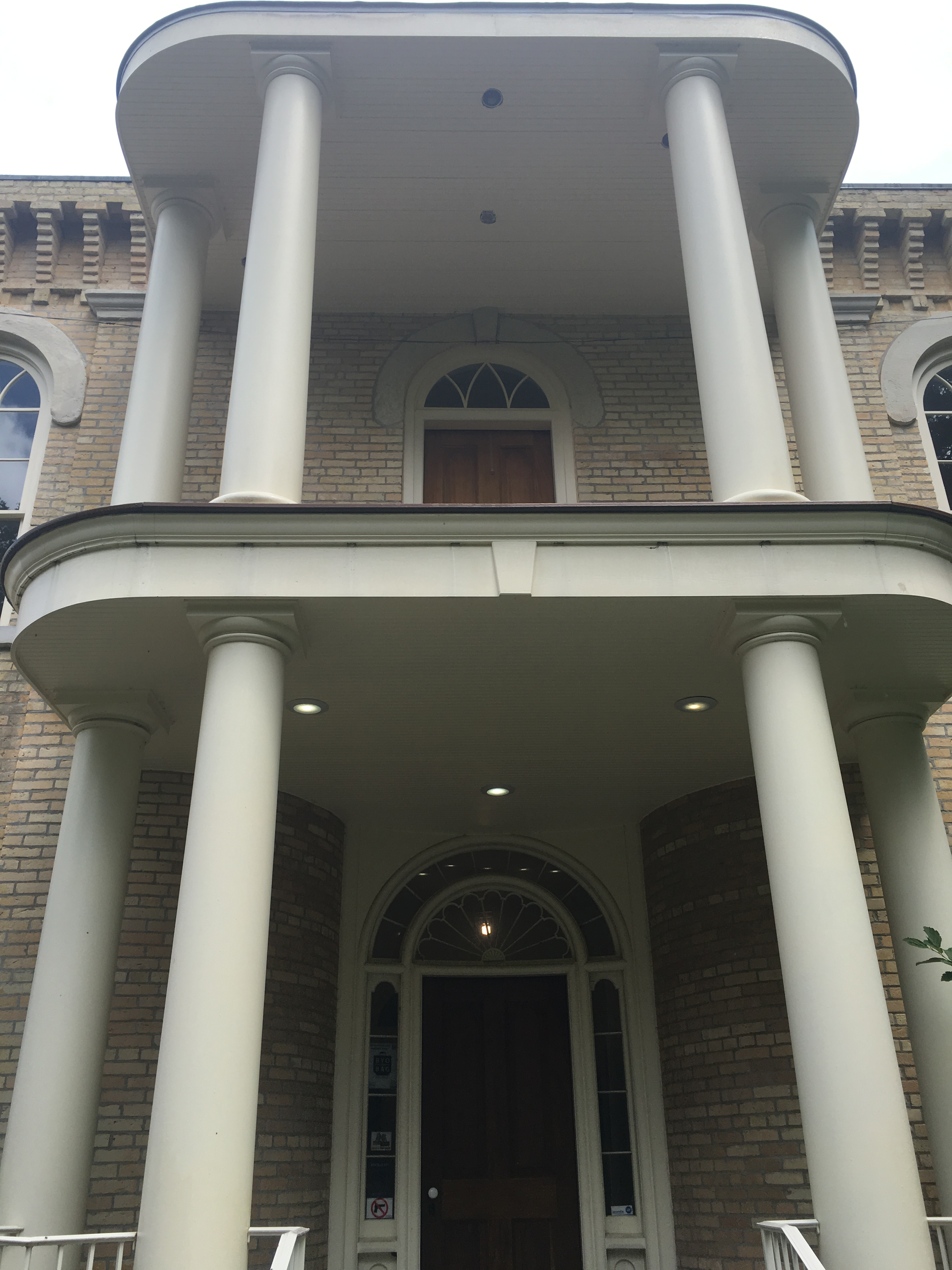
The entrance of the house. (2016)
