= Wonder Lake, Illinois =

- Village
- Logo
- Motto: "Village of Parks"
- Location of Wonder Lake in McHenry County, Illinois
- Coordinates: 42°42′46″N 88°22′48″W
- Country: United States
- State: Illinois
- County: McHenry
- Townships: Greenwood, McHenry

Area
  - Total: 6.12 sq mi (15.85 km^{2})
  - Land: 4.97 sq mi (12.86 km^{2})
  - Water: 1.15 sq mi (2.99 km^{2})
- Elevation: 804 ft (245 m)

Population (2020)
  - Total: 3,973
  - Density: 800.4/sq mi (309.03/km^{2})
- Time zone: UTC-6 (CST)
  - Summer (DST): UTC-5 (CDT)
- ZIP code: 60097
- Area code: 815 847
- FIPS code: 17-82855
- GNIS feature ID: 2399729
- Website: www.villageofwonderlake.org

Wonder Lake is a village in McHenry County, Illinois, United States. It is a commuter village in the Chicago metropolitan area. The population was 3,973 at the 2020 census. However including surrounding unincorporated subdivisions, the population is estimated at 10,000.

== Geography ==
According to the 2010 census, Wonder Lake has a total area of 5.925 square miles (15.35 km^{2}), of which 4.78 square miles (12.38 km^{2}) (or 80.68%) is land and 1.145 square miles (2.97 km^{2}) (or 19.32%) is water.

== Demographics ==
Historical population
Census	Pop.	Note	%±
1980	752		—
1990	1,024		36.2%
2000	1,345		31.3%
2010	4,026		199.3%
2020	3,973		−1.3%
U.S. Decennial Census

=== Racial and ethnic composition ===
Wonder Lake, Illinois – Racial and ethnic composition Note: the US Census treats Hispanic/Latino as an ethnic category. This table excludes Latinos from the racial categories and assigns them to a separate category. Hispanics/Latinos may be of any race.
Race / ethnicity (NH = Non-Hispanic)	Pop 2000	Pop 2010	Pop 2020	% 2000	% 2010	% 2020
White alone (NH)	1,266	3,642	3,301	94.13%	90.46%	83.09%
Black or African American alone (NH)	5	14	26	0.37%	0.35%	0.65%
Native American or Alaska Native alone (NH)	1	12	11	0.07%	0.30%	0.28%
Asian alone (NH)	4	39	30	0.30%	0.97%	0.76%
Pacific Islander alone (NH)	0	0	2	0.00%	0.00%	0.05%
Other race alone (NH)	1	3	11	0.07%	0.07%	0.28%
Mixed race or Multiracial (NH)	8	43	137	0.59%	1.07%	3.45%
Hispanic or Latino (any race)	60	273	455	4.46%	6.78%	11.45%
Total	1,345	4,026	3,973	100.00%	100.00%	100.00%

=== 2020 census ===
As of the 2020 census, Wonder Lake had a population of 3,973. The median age was 40.0 years. 23.6% of residents were under the age of 18 and 14.4% of residents were 65 years of age or older. For every 100 females there were 102.5 males, and for every 100 females age 18 and over there were 102.9 males age 18 and over.

33.6% of residents lived in urban areas, while 66.4% lived in rural areas.

There were 1,461 households in Wonder Lake, of which 35.6% had children under the age of 18 living in them. Of all households, 56.8% were married-couple households, 18.1% were households with a male householder and no spouse or partner present, and 16.0% were households with a female householder and no spouse or partner present. About 21.2% of all households were made up of individuals and 9.3% had someone living alone who was 65 years of age or older.

There were 1,621 housing units, of which 9.9% were vacant. The homeowner vacancy rate was 2.6% and the rental vacancy rate was 5.9%.

=== 2000 census ===
As of the 2000 census, there were 1,345 people, 445 households, and 367 families residing in the village. The population density was 1,657.4 inhabitants per square mile (639.9/km^{2}). There were 488 housing units at an average density of 601.4 per square mile (232.2/km^{2}). The racial makeup of the village was 97.17% White, 0.37% Black or African American, 0.07% Native American, 0.30% Asian, 1.12% from other races, and 0.97% from two or more races. Hispanic or Latino people of any race were 4.46% of the population.

There were 445 households, out of which 45.2% had children under the age of 18 living with them, 69.4% were married couples living together, 9.0% had a female householder with no husband present, and 17.5% were non-families. 12.8% of all households were made up of individuals, and 3.8% had someone living alone who was 65 years of age or older. The average household size was 3.02 and the average family size was 3.32.

In the village, the population was spread out, with 31.9% under the age of 18, 7.3% from 18 to 24, 33.5% from 25 to 44, 20.6% from 45 to 64, and 6.8% who were 65 years of age or older. The median age was 34 years. For every 100 females, there were 105.7 males. For every 100 females age 18 and over, there were 99.6 males.

The median income for a household in the village was $59,712, and the median income for a family was $62,404. Males had a median income of $49,792 versus $27,500 for females. The per capita income for the village was $21,428. About 2.6% of families and 2.7% of the population were below the poverty line, including 3.3% of those under age 18 and 3.1% of those age 65 or over.

== Schools ==
Harrison School District 36 serves kindergarten through 8th grade students living on the east Side of the village of Wonder Lake. The school mascot is the Hurricane. The school property is located directly east of Harrison-Benwell County Park. The east side of Wonder Lake is served by McHenry Community High School District 156, while the west side is served by Woodstock Community Unit School District 200.

== Lake and village ==
The name Wonder Lake now refers to both the lake itself and a village incorporated in 1974 from one of the west side unincorporated blocks of homes, Sunrise Ridge, called "subdivisions", that surround most of the lake. Initially named the Village of Sunrise Ridge, the name was changed to the Village of Wonder Lake a few years later. The population of the combined village and all surrounding subdivisions has published population estimates currently over 10,000. The village saw its first major residential developments since before the Great Recession during late 2020. This includes the ongoing construction of the Stonewater subdivision off of Illinois Route 120 on the east side of Wonder Lake. Stonewater is estimated to add close to 10,000 people to the village's population by 2040. Residential development also started around the same time on the west side of the Lake, including the finishing of neighborhood projects that had been abandoned during the recession.

In an effort to reverse the filling of the lake with sediment, the village annexed the lake bottom in the early 2000s so as to gain control of the lake bottom and allow proceeding with cleanup. They won this only after a court case, as some people objected to the cost of the cleanup.

== Transportation ==
Pace provides bus service on Route 807 connecting Wonder Lake to McHenry, Woodstock and other destinations.
