= Greenwood Township, McHenry County, Illinois =

Coordinates: 42°21′58″N 88°25′14″W

Greenwood Township
- Township
- Location in McHenry County
- Country: United States
- State: Illinois
- County: McHenry
- Established: November 6, 1849

Area
  - Total: 35.78 sq mi (92.7 km^{2})
  - Land: 35.26 sq mi (91.3 km^{2})
  - Water: 0.53 sq mi (1.4 km^{2}) 1.48%

Population (2010)
  - Estimate (2016): 13,905
  - Density: 396.8/sq mi (153.2/km^{2})
- Time zone: UTC-6 (CST)
  - Summer (DST): UTC-5 (CDT)
- FIPS code: 17-111-31680
- Website: http://greenwoodtownship.net/

Greenwood Township is located in McHenry County, Illinois. As of the 2010 census, its population was 13,990 and it contained 5,040 housing units.

== Geography ==
According to the 2010 census, the township has a total area of 35.78 square miles (92.7 km^{2}), of which 35.26 square miles (91.3 km^{2}) (or 98.55%) is land and 0.53 square miles (1.4 km^{2}) (or 1.48%) is water.

== Demographics ==
Historical population
Census	Pop.	Note	%±
2016 (est.)	13,905
U.S. Decennial Census
