= Woodstock Square Historic District =

Historic district in Illinois, United States

- U.S. National Register of Historic Places
- U.S. Historic district
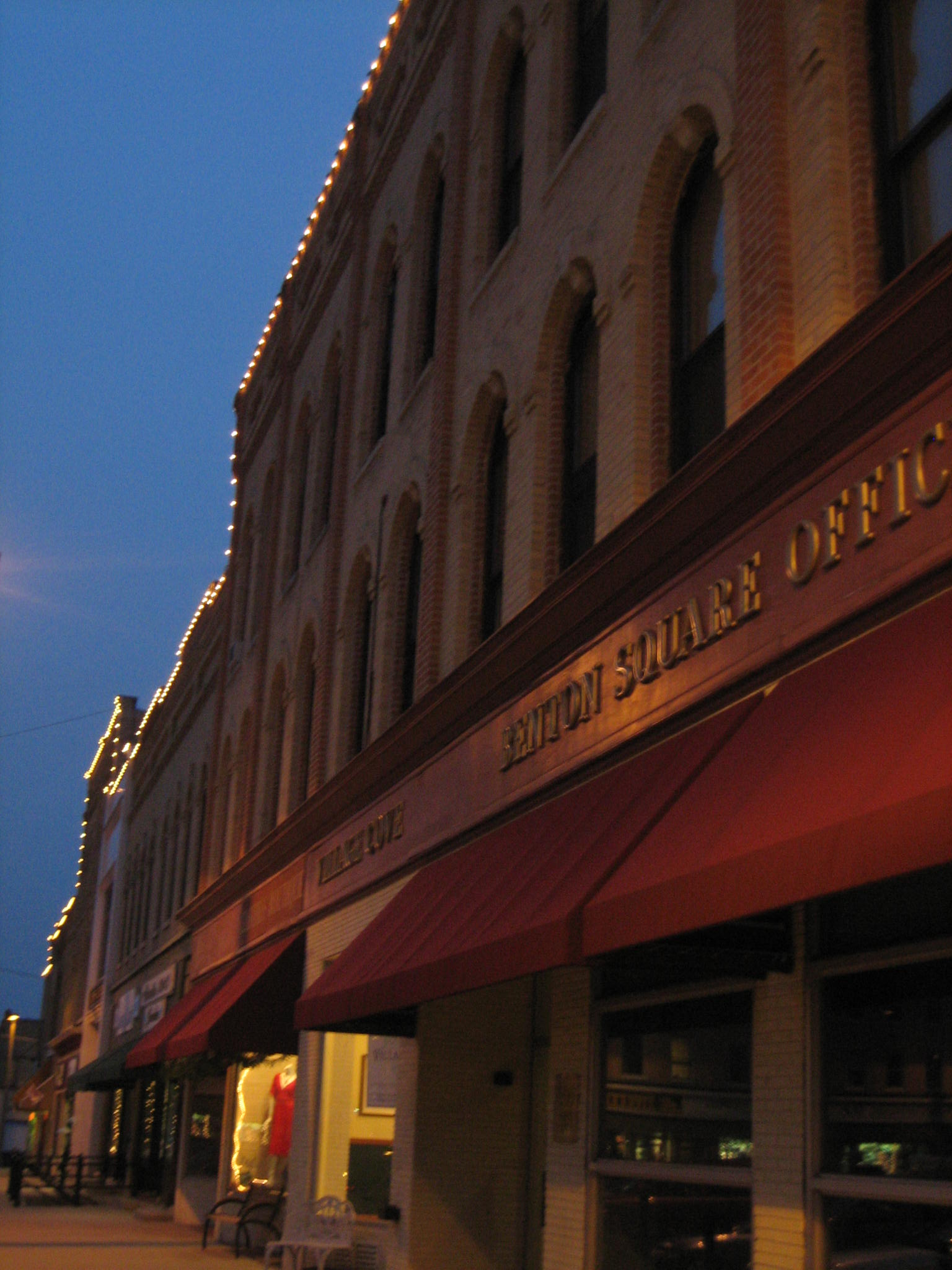
- Some of the buildings lining the historic Woodstock Square. Many of the buildings are privately owned and house small businesses.

- Location within Illinois Location within the United States
- Location: Roughly bounded by Calhoun, Throop, Cass, Main, C and NW RR Tracks, and Jefferson Sts., Woodstock, Illinois
- Coordinates: 42°18′53″N 88°26′50″W
- Area: 13 acres (5.3 ha)
- Built: Various, see article
- NRHP reference No.: 82000399
- Added to NRHP: November 12, 1982

The Woodstock Square Historic District is located in the county seat of McHenry County, Illinois, which is Woodstock. The district is located in downtown Woodstock and has been listed on the National Register of Historic Places since 1982. Within the district two of Woodstock's other Registered Places can be found, Woodstock Opera House and the Old McHenry County Courthouse.

== Square ==
The square consists of historic buildings and is anchored by two key structures, the Old McHenry County Courthouse and the Woodstock Opera House. Most of the other buildings on the square are privately owned and kept up, housing numerous small businesses, including restaurants and shops. The streets of the square are one way and paved with brick, they square off a large public park which features two gazeebos and war memorials. During the winter the square and its buildings and trees are adorned with lights.

The Woodstock Square is host to a number of festivals and events throughout the year. Some the events include Harvestdays, Old Time Fiddlers Competition and Groundhog Days, celebrating the city of Woodstock's role in the 1993 film Groundhog Day. Groundhog Day was filmed on location in Woodstock, Illinois, the city portrayed Punxsutawney, Pennsylvania in the film.

== Structures ==
=== Old McHenry County Courthouse ===
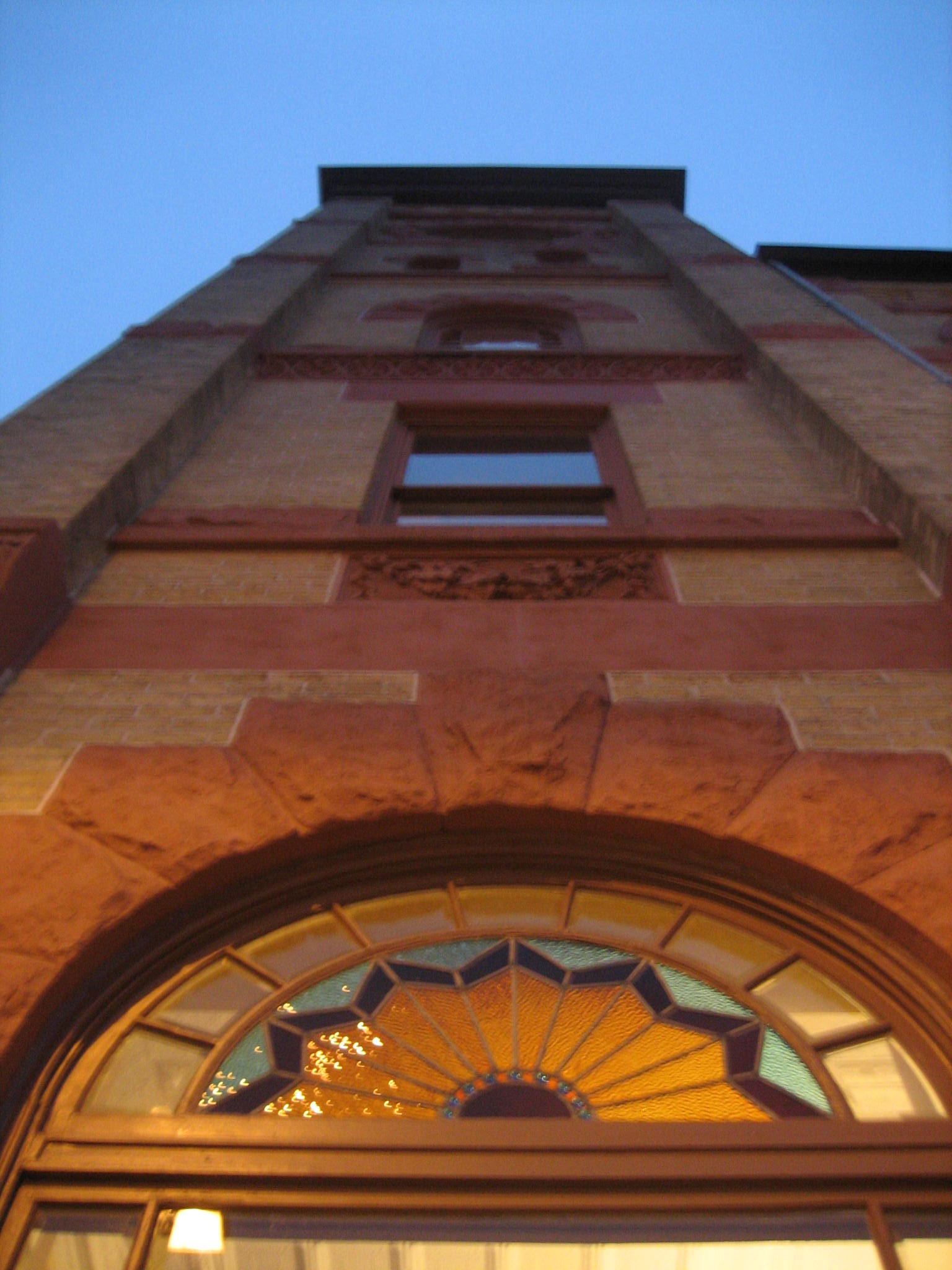
The bell tower of the Woodstock Opera House.

The Old McHenry County Courthouse is separately listed on the National Register of Historic Places and was long the home for McHenry County government offices, though it no longer serves in that capacity. Today, the courthouse is home to several businesses and is one of the key elements in the Woodstock Square Historic District. Built in 1857 the Old Courthouse is designed in a simple Italianate style. The building is topped with a distinctive white dome which features a lightning rod.

=== Woodstock Opera House ===
The Woodstock Opera House has been in continuous operation since its construction was completed in 1889. Along with the Old Courthouse, the Opera House is one of the key elements of the Woodstock Square Historic District. Originally constructed to be a library, council room, court, fire department, and provide a second floor auditorium, the Opera House quickly became the center for McHenry County's entertainment. Today the Opera House hosts a variety of events. They include: concerts, theatre, dance, visual art, educational programs, lectures and meetings. The Woodstock Opera House is one of the oldest continually operating theatres in the United States.

== Woodstock Square in popular culture ==
A scene from Groundhog Day featuring the Woodstock Opera House.

Many key scenes, featuring Bill Murray, in Groundhog Day were filmed in and around the Woodstock Square Historic District. Murray's character is seen plummeting from the Woodstock Opera House after he figures out he will indefinitely be reliving the same day over and over again, causing him to become humorously suicidal. The restaurant where Murray's character is shown exhibiting God-like ability to predict the future is located on the Square as well and is still home to a small diner today.
