= Marching Song (play) =

Play by Orson Welles and Roger Hill

- First edition
- Original language: English
- Written by: Orson Welles; Roger Hill
- Subject: John Brown (abolitionist)
- Genre: Historical drama

Marching Song is a play about the legend of abolitionist John Brown, written in 1932 by Orson Welles and Roger Hill. It is most notable for its narrative device of a journalist piecing together a man's life through multiple, contradictory recollections—a framework that Welles would famously employ in his 1941 film, Citizen Kane. Although the play has never been professionally performed, an abridged version of Marching Song was presented in June 1950 at the Woodstock Opera House in Woodstock, Illinois, a world-premiere benefit production by the Todd School for Boys. Rowman & Littlefield will publish the play in August 2019.

== History ==
In March 1932, two months shy of his 17th birthday, Orson Welles returned to Chicago from his post-graduation trip to Europe and his time with the Gate Theatre in Dublin. Finding that he had few prospects despite his success in Ireland, Welles persuaded Roger Hill, his former teacher and lifelong friend, to collaborate with him on a biographical play about abolitionist John Brown and his efforts to organize a slave revolt in 1859. In May, Welles visited Harper's Ferry and other historic sites with Hill, who was leading a two-week field trip for boys attending the Todd School. In August, Welles retreated to Lac du Flambeau, Wisconsin, and stayed at the summer home of James B. Meigs and his family while he wrote the play. Welles typed a cover page that credits the play as being by "Orson Welles and Roger Hill"; Hill said he wrote only a few scenes that Welles edited and reworked.

"My own contribution to writing that play was a first draft of a first act," Hill recalled. "In other words, just enough to start our tireless boy off and, more importantly, send him off. Out of my hair."

== Production ==
Though Welles's complete playscript for Marching Song has not been produced, the Todd School for Boys presented an abbreviated world premiere of the play June 7–8, 1950, at the Woodstock Opera House. Hascy Tarbox, Welles's Todd School classmate and Hill's son-in-law, trimmed the four-hour play to two hours and staged the two performances for the benefit of the Woodstock Hospital.

== Publication ==
A copy of the typescript, including Welles's sketches and set design instructions, is held by the Lilly Library at Indiana University in Bloomington, Indiana.

On September 30, 1985, Hill told Welles that he had located his own copy of the play, which he planned to give him. "For my money it remains a compelling, if overly long, play. If that God-awful Hearts of Age … is worth saving, Marching Song, written two years earlier, should rate a Pulitzer. At least it's worth publication."

Rowman & Littlefield Publishing Group of Maryland announced it will publish the play in August 2019 – 87 years after it was written. It will be accompanied by two essays written by Hill's grandson, Todd Tarbox, which put the work in historical context and examine Welles's progressive politics.
