= Bright Lucifer =

Play by Orson Welles

- Written by: Orson Welles
- Characters: Bill Flynn, Jack Flynn, Eldred Brand
- Original language: English
- Genre: Horror

Bright Lucifer is an unproduced 1930s era semi-autobiographical horror play, and the first written by Orson Welles as a single author. It has, to date, never been professionally staged.

== History ==
Welles first began writing Bright Lucifer in 1932, while he was writing the play Marching Song at a friend's summer home in Lac du Flambeau, Wisconsin. He was still developing the text in September 1934 (having moved to New York to play the part of Tybalt in Katharine Cornell's transferred production of Romeo and Juliet), telling John Houseman that he was working on a script “about the devil” when they first met in December. He had intended to premiere the play at a proposed theater festival at his old school in the summer of 1935 (though this never came about; due to difficulties with the 1934 summer festival the event was not repeated), and continued to work on the script with an eye to producing it as late as 1938.

An amateur presentation was given of the script by a community group in Wisconsin on September 27, 1997, 12 years after Welles's death, at the Monona Terrace Community and Convention Center in Madison, Wisconsin.

== Characters ==
- Jack Flynn - a burned-out B-movie horror actor, suffering a nervous breakdown after the breakdown of his marriage - a cross between John Barrymore and Boris Karloff or Bela Lugosi
- Bill Flynn - a newspaper editor, his brother - a large, Falstaffian father-figure with a heart condition
- Eldred Brand - Bill's teenage ward, an asthmatic orphan - a "bitch boy," and the Lucifer of the plays title

== Plot ==
After the disappearance of Jack's wife (in the wake of a sexual affair and drug abuse scandal), he has abandoned his career in Hollywood (where he specialised in "creature features" - playing the monster in B-movie horror films) and is on the verge of a nervous breakdown. He has arranged for a retreat to recover in the family cabin (on a north woods Indian reservation) with his brother (Bill - a tabloid newspaper editor) and his brother's young ward (Eldred - a strange, young asthmatic), his brother's wife (Martha) due to arrive a few days later. As the play opens the three males have been fishing, and tensions are already high. Outside the cabin an American Indian funeral is ongoing, and "devil drums" ceaselessly beat throughout. The twisting story unfolds to encompass whisky, murder, God, the Devil, a monster costume, insanity, and the hysterical desecration of a corpse. The entire play taking place over two nights, and is set entirely in the cabin in the woods.

== Themes ==
=== Gothicism ===
The play is a lurid gothic horror, mixing high art with grand guignol; the Chicago Tribune referred to the play as a combination of Henrik Ibsen, Eugene O'Neill, Weird Tales and The Twilight Zone.

=== Father-figures ===
Welles was orphaned at the age of 15, and was adopted by Dr. Maurice Bernstein - a lover of his mothers'. This relationship directly reflects that of Eldred and Bill, and biographers have speculated on the autobiographical nature of the depiction.

=== Homoeroticism ===
A notable aspect of the play, considering the era in which it was written, is the homoerotic undertone which runs throughout (not to mention the implied Hebephilia of the Bill/Eldred relationship).

=== As a precursor to other Welles works ===
- The constant beat of the "devil drums" and the exoticised "magic" of the American Indian tribe outside the cabin reflect the staging of both Welles's 1936 Voodoo Macbeth and his 1937 Dr Faustus.
- Jack's talk of wanting "to scare people in a big scale ... Not lousy movies. No, I mean artistically -- a huge practical joke" has been connected with Welles's own infamous 1938 "War of the Worlds" broadcast.
- Bill runs a tabloid newspaper, the National Weekly, a theme famously returned to in Welles's 1941 Citizen Kane.
- Bill's gregarious, avuncular character echoes Welles's obsession with the Falstaff of his earlier Five Kings and later Chimes at Midnight.
- The notion of "character" as something predetermined and unchangeable in people, as in the "scorpion and the frog" story of Mr Arkadin.
