= Old McHenry County Courthouse =

- U.S. National Register of Historic Places
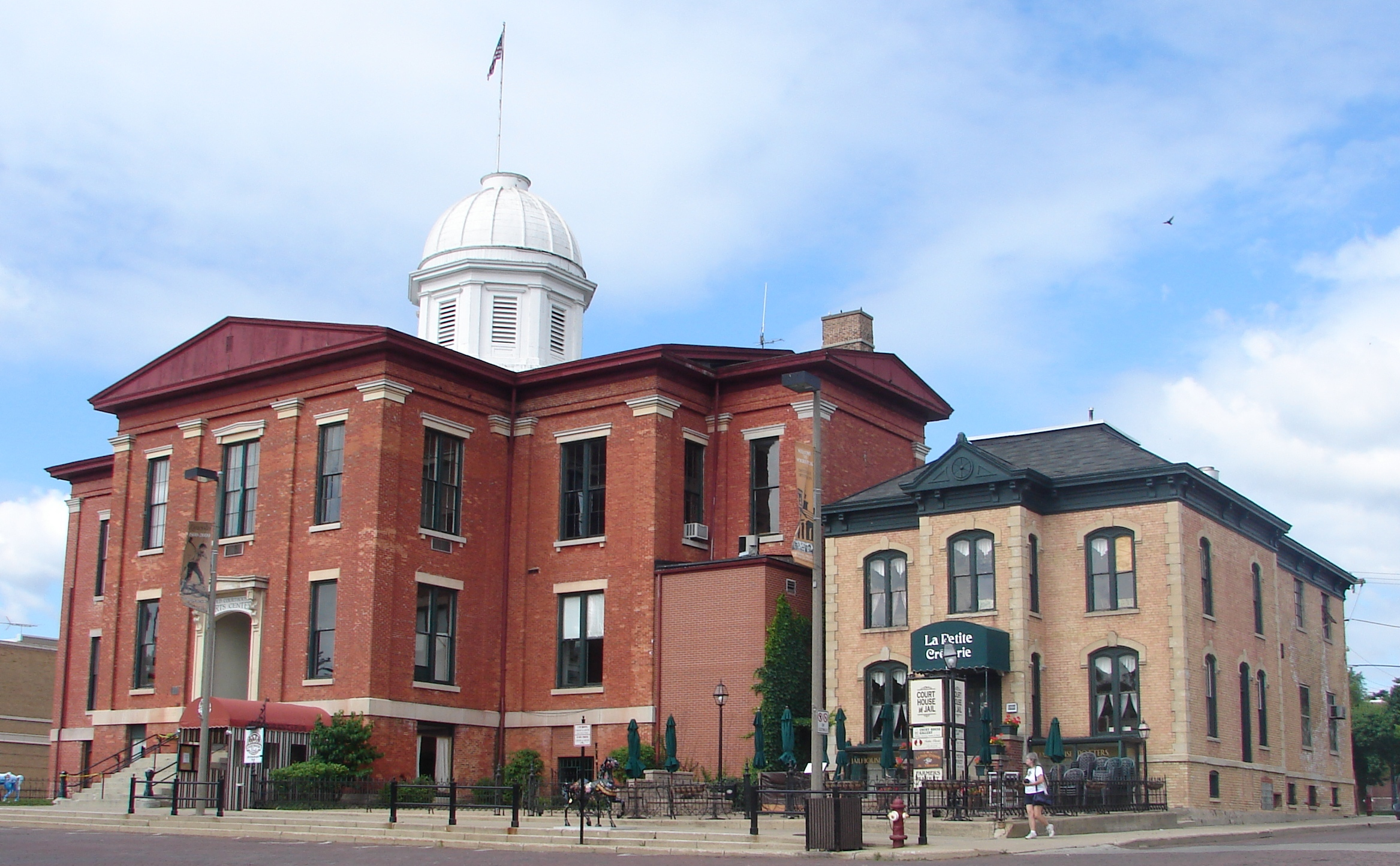
- The Old McHenry County Courthouse in Woodstock, Illinois. The jail, added in the 1870s, is on the right.

- Location within Illinois
- Interactive map showing the location of Old McHenry County Courthouse
- Location: Woodstock, McHenry County, Illinois, United States
- Coordinates: 42°18′53.57″N 88°26′53.61″W
- Built: 1857
- Architect: J.M. Van Osdel
- Architectural style: Italianate
- NRHP reference No.: 74002183
- Added to NRHP: November 1, 1974

The Old McHenry County Courthouse, in McHenry County, Illinois, was listed on the National Register of Historic Places on November 1, 1974. Once the courthouse in Woodstock, the county seat of McHenry County, the former courthouse is occupied by various private tenants including a restaurant and an art gallery. It is one of the key structures in the Woodstock Square Historic District.

== History ==
The 1857 Italianate Old Courthouse was constructed to closely resemble the 1853 Cook County Courthouse (which was eventually destroyed during the Great Chicago Fire). The structure was designed by John M. Van Osdel, the first licensed architect in Chicago. The adjoining structure, the Sheriff's House and Jail was built in 1887. It was there, in the Sheriff's House and Jail that Eugene Debs was held for his refusal to comply with an injunction during the Pullman Strike. Until 1973 McHenry County government offices were located in the Old Courthouse. When the government moved out, the building was threatened with demolition, as it stood on prime commercial property. On November 1, 1974, it was recognized by the National Park Service on the National Register of Historic Places. Eight years later it was listed as a contributing property to the Woodstock Square Historic District, a 13-acre (5.3 ha) corridor in downtown Woodstock. Today the two buildings house two restaurants, one in each building, and art gallery (in the courthouse), a pottery shop (in the jail building) and the Chester Gould-Dick Tracy Museum.

=== Chester Gould-Dick Tracy Museum ===
Chester Gould, creator of Dick Tracy comic strips, was a 50-year Woodstock resident. The Chester Gould-Dick Tracy Museum features original comic strips and Dick Tracy memorabilia and collectibles including artifacts related to the character's depiction in radio, television and film. The Museum closed its doors in June 2008 and went virtual.

== Architecture ==
The Old McHenry County Courthouse faces the Woodstock public square. The Italianate structure was built out of brick with limestone trim. With four identical, 20-by-44-square-foot (1.9 m^{2} × 4.1 m^{2}) wings around a 44-square-foot (4.1 m^{2}) core, the building resembles a Greek cross. The building stands two stories tall with a brick basement. A cupola is found at the center of the cross. A bay was later added to the southern wing, and small additions were made from the judge's chamber and a vault. The southwest corner has a one-story addition. The jail was originally found in the basement, but was moved to a new building along the north wall in the 1870s.
