= Woodstock Mozart Festival =

Music Festival

Coordinates: 42°19′52″N 88°26′52″W

- Company type: non-profit
- Industry: Live music
- Founded: 1987
- Headquarters: Woodstock Opera House; Woodstock, Illinois, USA
- Key people: Anita Whelan, Executive Director; Mark Peskanov, Artistic Advisor; Lori Babinec, Personnel Manager/Librarian
- Products: Summer Festival
- Revenue: non-profit
- Website: Woodstock Mozart Festival

The Woodstock Mozart Festival was a summer music festival in Woodstock, Illinois that presented classical music concerts, primarily of Mozart's music, by the Woodstock Mozart Festival Orchestra and guest artists.

== History ==
The Woodstock Mozart Festival had its origins in the 1987 as part of a summer festival at the Woodstock Opera House entitled "Woodfest". Additional performances were scheduled for the following year, and the 3 week festival continued to be held annually through 2015. Internationally recognized guest artists were a mainstay of the festival since the beginning.

The festival's original conductor/artistic director was Charles Bornstein. Since 1983, guest conductors were an integral part of the festival format. Performances also included a chamber music series and concerts in the Woodstock square gazebo (as part of the City of Woodstock's concert in the parks series).

John von Rhein, classical music critic for the Chicago Tribune, wrote "The Woodstock Mozart Festival has long been a means for local classical buffs to catch rising young musicians and established artists who seldom get to crack the sacred precincts of downtown Chicago."

In 1995, the Festival Orchestra was named "Chamber Orchestra of the Year" by the Illinois Council of Orchestras.

== Goals ==
The Festival's goal is to maintain a superb orchestra that delivers extraordinary performances, centered on Mozart, which inspire and educate audiences of all ages.

== Orchestra Personnel ==
The orchestra was composed of musicians from Chicago, Milwaukee, and New York, as well as Europe.

== Final Season ==
The Woodstock Mozart Festival website states that 2015 was its final season:

"It is with great regret that we announce that the Woodstock Mozart Festival will close after this past 2015 season, our 29th. All of us associated with the Festival – musicians, Board members, Artistic and General Director – extend our deep appreciation to all who have attended concerts and contributed to make the Festival such a value to the Woodstock community and beyond. We will miss performing for you…"
