= Marcellus L. Joslyn =

Founder of Joslyn Manufacturing and Supply Co. (1873–1963)

- Born: February 6, 1873; Woodstock, Illinois, U.S.
- Died: 1963 (aged 89–90)
- Known for: Marcellus L. Joslyn Foundation
- Spouse: Alice Cecelia Newell
- Parent(s): Merritt L. and Mary Robinson Joslyn

Marcellus L. Joslyn (February 6, 1873 – 1963) was the founder and principal stockholder of the Joslyn Manufacturing and Supply Company, a Chicago, Illinois electrical supply firm.

== Early life ==
Marcellus Linsey Joslyn was born in Woodstock, Illinois. He is the youngest of the two sons, David Robinson Joslyn (1866–1937) and Marcellus L. Joslyn, of Merritt L. and Mary Robinson Joslyn.

== Joslyn Manufacturing & Supply Co., Chicago, Illinois ==
In 1894 when Marcellus was a student (1893–1896) at Harvard Law School, he built his own telephone line to his parents' home and then established the Citizens Telephone Co. In 1910, Marcellus opened Joslyn Manufacturing & Supply Co., to manufacture telephone pole line hardware.

In the early 1950s, Joslyn worked with several airframe manufacturers and the Lightning and Transient Research Institute of Minneapolis to address post World War II concerns of lightning and electromagnetic pulse (EMP) impacts on aircraft HF radios. Over the next several years, he recruited electronics engineers to design and develop product lines. After becoming a supplier of aircraft lightning arresters, the company introduced products for electrical surge and transient protection for power, communications, transportation and industrial process control.

Joslyn's once said of his business philosophy, "Make no trade that is not good for both parties." The Joslyn plan called for labor and management working together and as Joslyn said, "No man amounts to anything by himself and one can only rise by the friendships and loyalties of those around him which can only be secured by thoughtfulness and courtesy and fairness".

Joslyn was president of the company until 1946 when he relinquished that office and became chairman of the board of directors.

Joslyn retired to Santa Monica, California, where he became involved in philanthropic interests.

== Marcellus L. Joslyn Foundation ==
When Joslyn retired to the Santa Monica area in 1947 he became involved in real estate, lawn bowling, mountain climbing and philanthropic interests. In 1960 he founded the Marcellus L. Joslyn Foundation with major emphasis on Senior Citizen Centers, hospitals, colleges and other deserving groups. The foundation donated several million dollars to senior community centers and lawn bowls clubs in Southern California. Many Southern California bowling clubs carry the Joslyn name, as does the senior center and several other buildings in Manhattan Beach. Joslyn was elected to the US Lawn Bowls Hall of Fame.

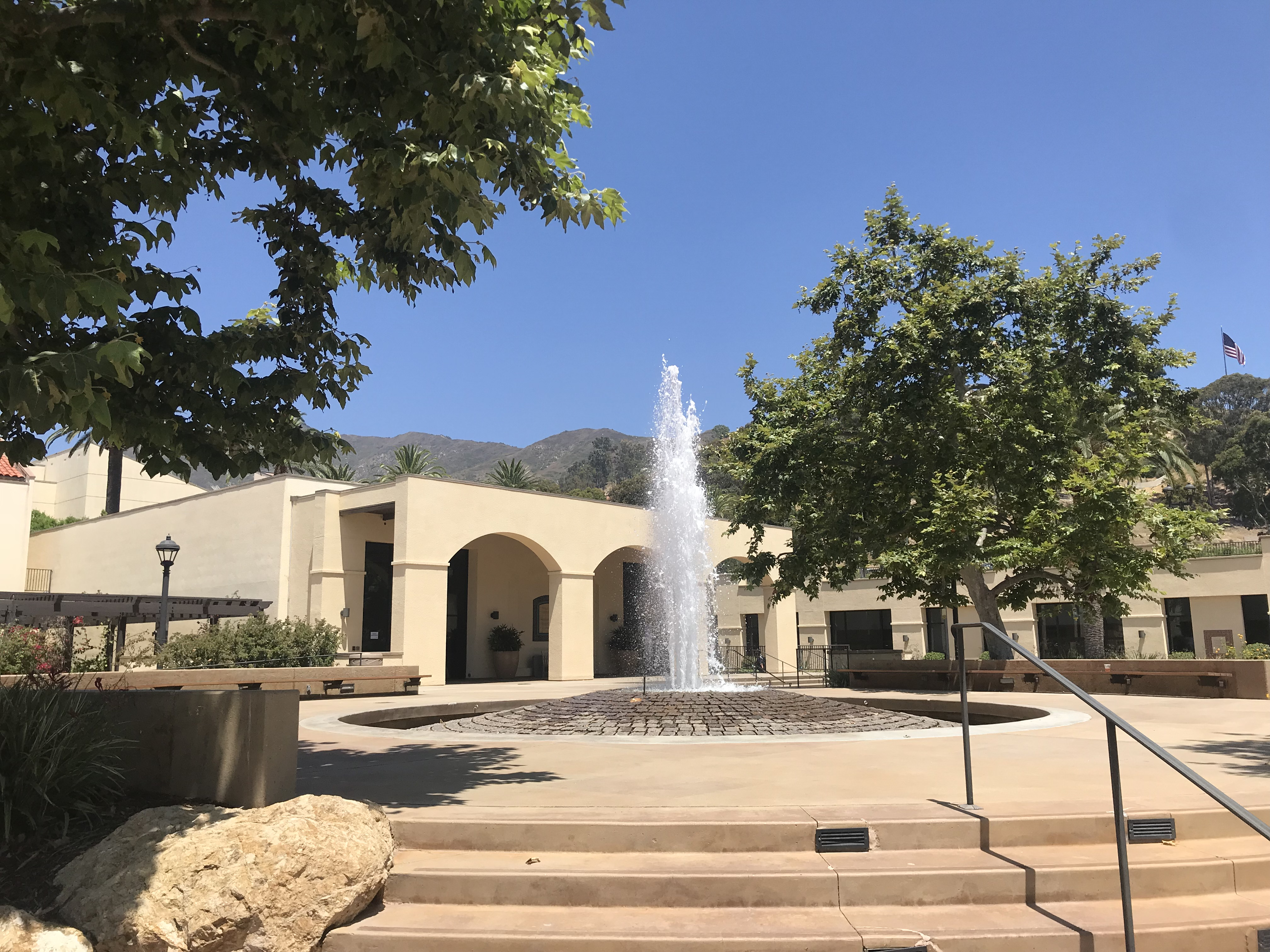
Joslyn Plaza, Pepperdine University, Malibu, California.

== Family ==
Joslyn's mother, Mary Robinson Joslyn spent the last years of her life in Santa Monica where she had (Robinson) relatives.

In 1899, Joslyn married Alice Cecelia Newell, and they had four children (sons Marcellus Newell, George Robinson, Meritt Lindsey and daughter Mary Cecelia Parker). The Joslyns lived in Hinsdale, Illinois. From 1902 to 1936 they spent approximately three months of each year in Southern California. In 1937 Alice Joslyn became bedridden, and from that time till Joslyn retired, the Joslyns spent approximately six months in California to avoid the Illinois winters.

A widely cited alimony legal case involved son George R. Joslyn and his wife, Charlotte C. Joslyn. George declared bankruptcy in 1936 but failed to schedule his interest in two trust estates, in each of which he was named as a beneficiary.
