= Jazz on the Square =

U.S. non-profit organization

Jazz on the Square (JOTS) is a 501(c)(3) not-for-profit organization which organizes jazz performance and jazz education events. It was founded in 2007 and incorporated in 2009 and is based in Woodstock, Illinois (not to be confused with Woodstock in New York) .

The goal of JOTS is to provide jazz education clinics/workshops and learning experiences to McHenry County, Illinois, promoting jazz education and jazz performance.

The styles of music are as varied as the performers who participate, and include jazz standards, bebop, Latin jazz, cool jazz, hard bop and swing; sometimes events take on a more experimental feel featuring funk, fusion and blues interpretations of jazz standards.

== Biweekly evening jazz jam sessions ==
Billy Denk and David Reilly performing at Jazz on the Square jam session in 2009

The organization provided a venue for live jazz in McHenry County by hosting weekly jazz jams at Pirro's Restaurante in Woodstock from September 2007 to June 2008. The jams featured the John Weber Trio as the house band. In September 2008, JOTS began hosting the Monthly Jazz Jam Series at Stage Left Cafe in Woodstock. The house band featured Billy Denk, Daniel Villarreal-Carrillo and David Reilly. In January 2009, the jazz jams were scheduled for the first and third Friday each month with Billy Denk as host. Several area musicians sit in as house band members.

In addition to the performance opportunities, JOTS's approach is to make the jazz jams an opportunity for all levels of musicians to learn the art of jazz and express themselves musically. Student musicians are encouraged to sit in early in the evening. Seasoned professionals join in as the evening progresses. These Jazz jams are currently scheduled for the first and third Friday. JOTS also offers workshops as part of the annual festival.

The Latin Side of JOTS is an educational and interactive exploration of Latin jazz in which elements of Brazilian, Cuban and other Latin jazz traditions are performed, demonstrated, and discussed.

== Annual summer festival ==
To support the Woodstock Jazz Festival and its educational programming, the organization holds a fundraiser each June at Stage Left Cafe. JOTS also hosts an annual holiday show each December; past performances have included the Typhanie Monique Quartet and the Glazz Ensemble.

The 2008 Festival took place August 22–24, 2008. Musicians performed on the Woodstock City Square during the day and in restaurant and club venues around the Square in the evening.

The purpose of the festival was to promote appreciation and understanding of live performances of jazz music and to increase participation in the art of making jazz music. Venues participating included Courthouse Grill, La Petite Creperie, Liquid Blues, Pirro's Restaurante and the Woodstock Public House as well as the Woodstock Farmer's Market. Musical acts included the BBJ Project, Doc Brown, Juliano Gypsy Jazz, John Weber Trio featuring Dave Childress, Jud & Judy Brown, Mike Louie Quartet, Music Mavericks, McHenry County Jazz Combo directed by Dr. Thomas Takayama, Billy Denk Trio, New Fuse, SRV Trio, Summer Hallenstein and Toots.

The 2009 Festival took place August 21–22, 2009. As with the previous festival, several local venues and restaurants participated; including La Petite Creperie, Liquid Blues, Odd Fellow's, Stage Left Cafe, Woodstock Farmer's Market, Herban Fare and O'Leary's Pub. Musical acts included Roger Panella Duo, Billy Denk's GLAZZ, Paul Abella Trio, Conductive Alliance, John Weber Trio, McHenry County College Jazz Combo, Doc Brown, BBJ Project, Jeff Matz, London Thomas Duo, Blue Skies, Music Mavericks & Juliano Milo Gypsy Jazz. In addition, a jazz drumming clinic was held by friends of JOTS, Rick Brabeck and Hot Rod Music. Workshops begun as part of the 2009 Woodstock Jazz Festival; musicians Rick Brabeck and Rick Embach hosted a clinic on jazz percussion techniques at Hot Rod Music in Cary, Illinois.

The 2010 Festival took place August 27–28, 2010. For the 2010 festival, the event was held exclusively at Stage Left Cafe and the Woodstock City Square. The festival featured several up-and-coming musicians on the Chicago jazz scene including: Chris Green Quartet, Elaine Dame Duo with Kyle Asche, Outcast Jazz Band, Paul Abella Quartet, Roger Panella Trio, Shawn Maxwell Quartet and Typhanie Monique & Neal Alger. In addition, several local musicians participated: Blue Skies, McHenry County College Jazz Combo and Music Mavericks. Friends of JOTS; La Petite Creperie and Liquid Blues, also featured live jazz. The Liquid Blues set was notable for the John Weber Trio's performance. Special guest Billy Denk sat in with the trio. The event was sponsored by WDCB (90.9 FM). As part of the 2010 Woodstock Jazz Festival, music educators Thomas Takayama and Bryan Kyrouac, presented "Duke Ellington: Imagery in American Music" at Stage Left Cafe. The presentation was a multimedia exploration of the music and life of Duke Ellington. In addition to narrative provided by Dr. Takayama, Mr. Kryouac provided narrative and examples of musical and stylistic components of Ellington's compositions using the trombone and tenor saxophone.

The 2011 Festival took place August 26–27, 2011, at Stage Left Cafe and on the Woodstock Square. The lineup included Marbin, John Weber Trio, Tony do Rosario Quartet, Paul Abella Trio, McHenry County College Jazz Combo, Outcast Jazz Band, FiJazzKo, Aaron Koppel Quartet and Chris Greene Quartet. For the 2011 Woodstock Jazz Festival, Takayama and Kyrouac presented "Recordings That Revolutionized Jazz: Kind of Blue, Time Out and Bitches Brew" at Stage Left Cafe. The presentation explored the stylistic and compositional approaches of the recordings which were groundbreaking for its time and continue to influence jazz music today.

The 2012 Festival took place August 23–25, 2012, again at Stage Left Cafe and on the Woodstock Square. The lineup included Bailey | Bryson Project, Petra van Nuis & Andy Brown, Chris Greene Quartet, LePercolateur, Outcast Jazz Band, MCC Jazz Combo, Billy Denk & Jim Seidel, Paul Abella Trio and Shawn Maxwell Quartet. In addition, the John Weber Trio performed at Liquid Blues for an after-fest Friday show. In 2012, Takayama and Kyrouac again provided an educational overview on the elements of jazz during a presentation within the 2012 Woodstock Jazz Festival.

The 2013 Festival took place August 22–24, 2013. Performers included Brent Kimbrough & Company, Nia Quintet, Frank Russell Group, Whirlpool featuring Caroline Davis, Outcast Jazz Band, MCC Jazz Combo, Billy Denk Trio featuring Jim Seidel & Phil Ciancio, Bryan Kyrouac (Workshop), Benjamin & Stephen Lynerd Group, Tim Fitzgerald, and the John Weber Trio.

== Organizational structure ==
JOTS was founded in 2007 by jazz enthusiasts Robert Honesty, Judith Honesty, Randy Robinson, Jim Hecht, Erin Denk and Billy Denk. The group was incorporated as a not-for-profit organization, achieving 501(c)(3) status in 2009 to better match its mission to provide educational opportunities to the community. Board members have included Erin Denk, Billy Denk, Robert Honesty, Nicole Honesty, Dr. Thomas Takayama, Bryan Kyrouac and John Nelson.

== See also ==
- Woodstock Jazz Festival, an unrelated 1981 event of the same name, held in Woodstock, New York
