= Michael J. Brown =

American politician (born 1941)

Michael J. Brown (born March 11, 1941) is a former American politician and appraiser.

Born in Woodstock, Illinois, Brown received his bachelor's degree from Illinois Institute of Technology. He also studied at Northwestern University and McHenry County College. He was an appraiser and lived in Crystal Lake, Illinois. On July 28, 1997, Brown was appointed to the Illinois House of Representatives and served until 1999. Brown was a Republican.
