= Woodstock Opera House =

- U.S. National Register of Historic Places
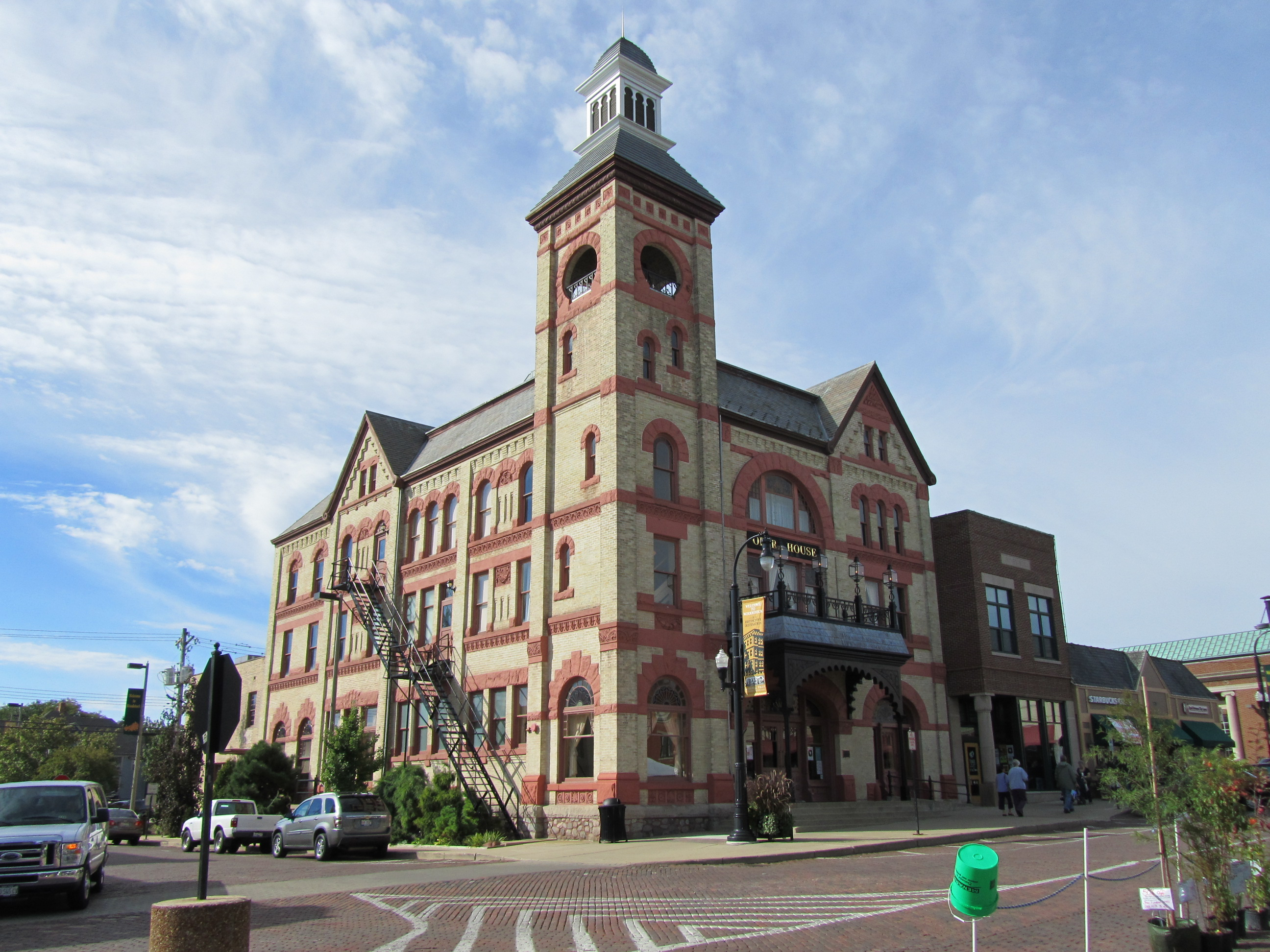

- Location within Illinois Location within the United States
- Location: 121 Van Buren St., Woodstock, Illinois
- Coordinates: 42°19′52″N 88°26′52″W
- Area: 0.1 acres (0.040 ha)
- Built: 1889
- Architect: Hoag, Smith
- NRHP reference No.: 74002184
- Added to NRHP: July 17, 1974

The Woodstock Opera House is a historical venue for performing arts and receptions located in Woodstock, Illinois. It was built in 1889 and designed as a multi-use facility with space for city administration offices as well as police and fire departments. The building was planned by architect Smith Hoag and built by contractor Simon Brink for a cost of $25,000. Today, the City of Woodstock still owns the building, but the building is used exclusively as a performance space.

In 2013, the stage was dedicated to Orson Welles, who grew up in Woodstock and performed at the venue during his formative years.

== History ==
The Opera House was built in 1889 to house the library, council room, justice court, fire department and second floor auditorium for the City of Woodstock. The Patti Rosa Company provided the inaugural performance of Margery Daw on Thursday, September 4, 1890.

The Opera House became McHenry County’s center for entertainment hosting touring vaudeville, minstrel and dramatic companies.

When the traveling circuits disappeared in the early 20th century, the Opera House became the site for the Chicago-area's first, however short-lived, summer stock theatre. Presented by the Todd School for Boys, The Todd Theatre Festival of 1934 was a six-week summer festival organized by Orson Welles, a 1931 graduate of the school. Three plays were presented — Trilby, Hamlet and Tsar Paul — featuring Welles, Hilton Edwards and Micheál MacLiammóir of Dublin's Gate Theatre, Louise Prussing, Charles O'Neal and Constance Heron. The stage of the Woodstock Opera House was dedicated to Welles in 2013, and the Woodstock Opera House hosted an 80th anniversary celebration of the Todd Theatre Festival.

In 1947, a group of citizens formed and supported the Woodstock Players. For several years the Players provided acting experience for students after graduating from the Goodman School. Paul Newman, Tom Bosley, Betsy Palmer, Geraldine Page, Shelley Berman and Lois Nettleton were among the more notable personalities.

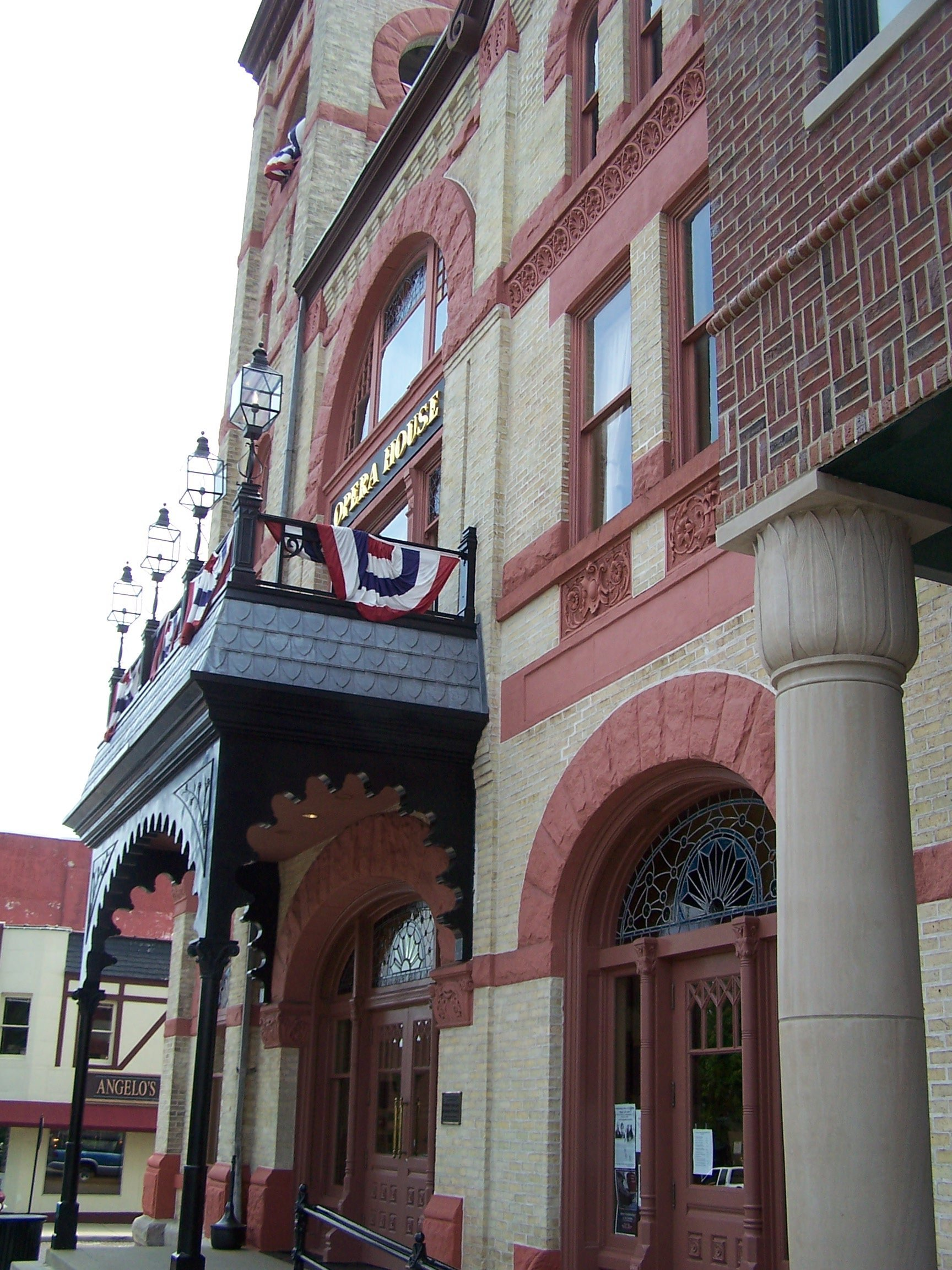
Entrance

In 1968, the Town Square Players was established. They were incorporated as a non-profit organization in 1973. In 1974, the Woodstock Musical Theatre Company was founded and made the Opera House their home. In 2019, the companies merged to create Theatre 121 and still perform regular seasons at the Opera House every year.

== Architecture ==
Erected in 1889, the Opera House was designed and constructed by Elgin-based architect Smith Hoag at a cost of $25,000. The construction materials are mostly of local origin including limestone, terra cotta, fieldstone, white brick, and sandstone. Its architectural style is a mixture of late Victorian-era tastes combined with Early American, Midwestern, Gothic, and even Moorish elements. The interior is modeled after the showboats of the time, with dimensions and decorations that imitate many of those grand floating theatres.

In 1960, the Junior Civic Arts League invested time and effort to battle the increasing deterioration of the auditorium and stage. The Woodstock Fine Arts Association was formed in 1961 with the purpose of restoring the Opera House through the next decade.

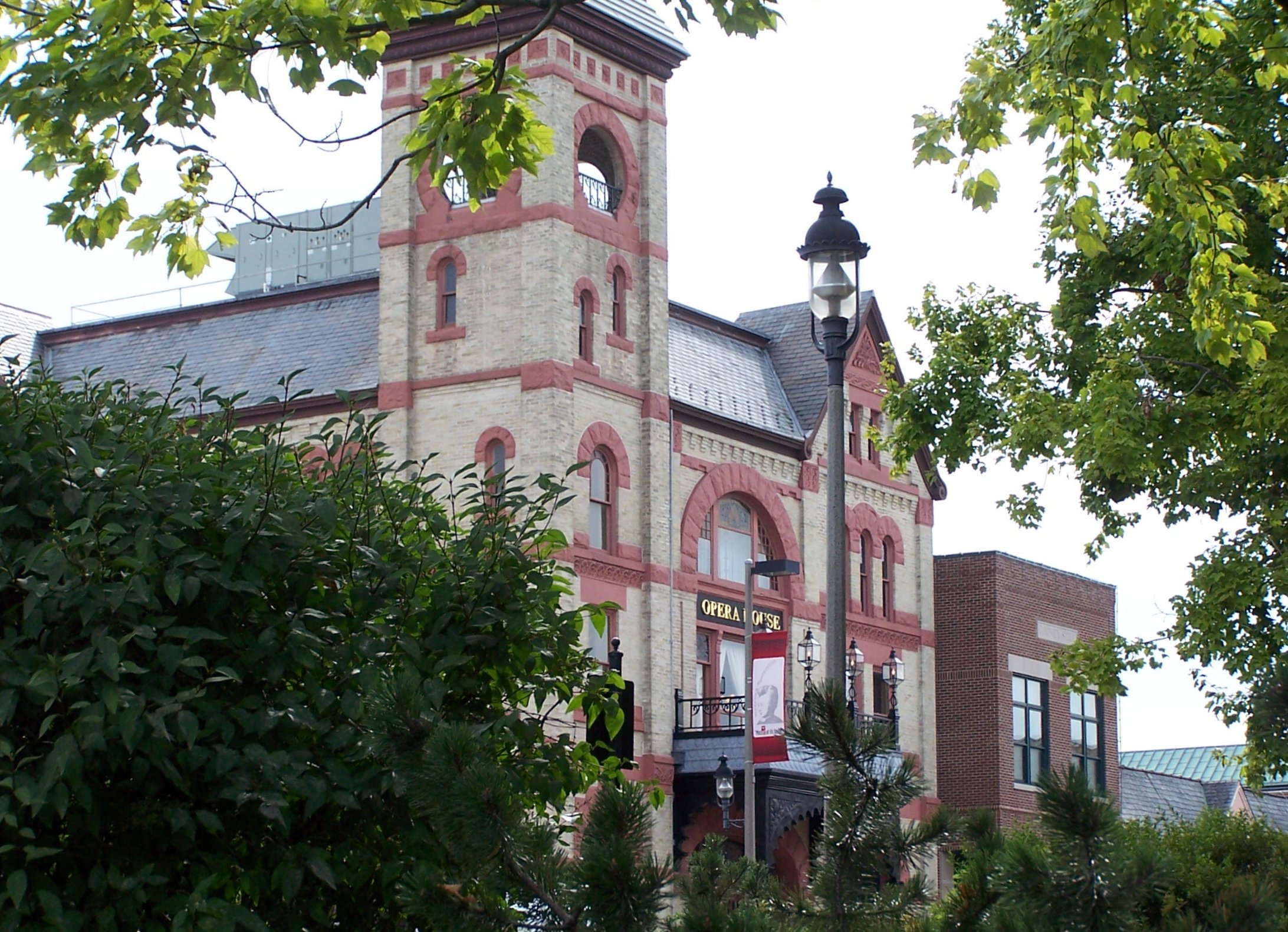
Woodstock Opera House

In 1972, the Opera House was declared a "landmark" by the city and the Woodstock Opera House Community Center, Inc. was formed to raise funds for a restoration effort. The Opera House was later closed for two years of restoration work. It reopened in February 1977 and was renamed the Woodstock Opera House Community Center. Additional restoration projects were finished over the next two decades and the Opera House was considered fully restored with the final addition of the front Portico in 1999.

The building continues to be owned and maintained by the City of Woodstock and local residents. It features historic furnishings, stained glass windows, tin ceilings, original woodwork and hand drawn stencil ornamentations.

In 2003, a new annex was completed and added to the Opera House on its adjacent lot. It provides disability access to the stage, a freight elevator, additional back stage areas, offices and the Stage Left Café.

The Orson Welles Stage was dedicated February 10, 2013, honoring the site of Welles's American debut as a professional theatre director.

== Current operations ==
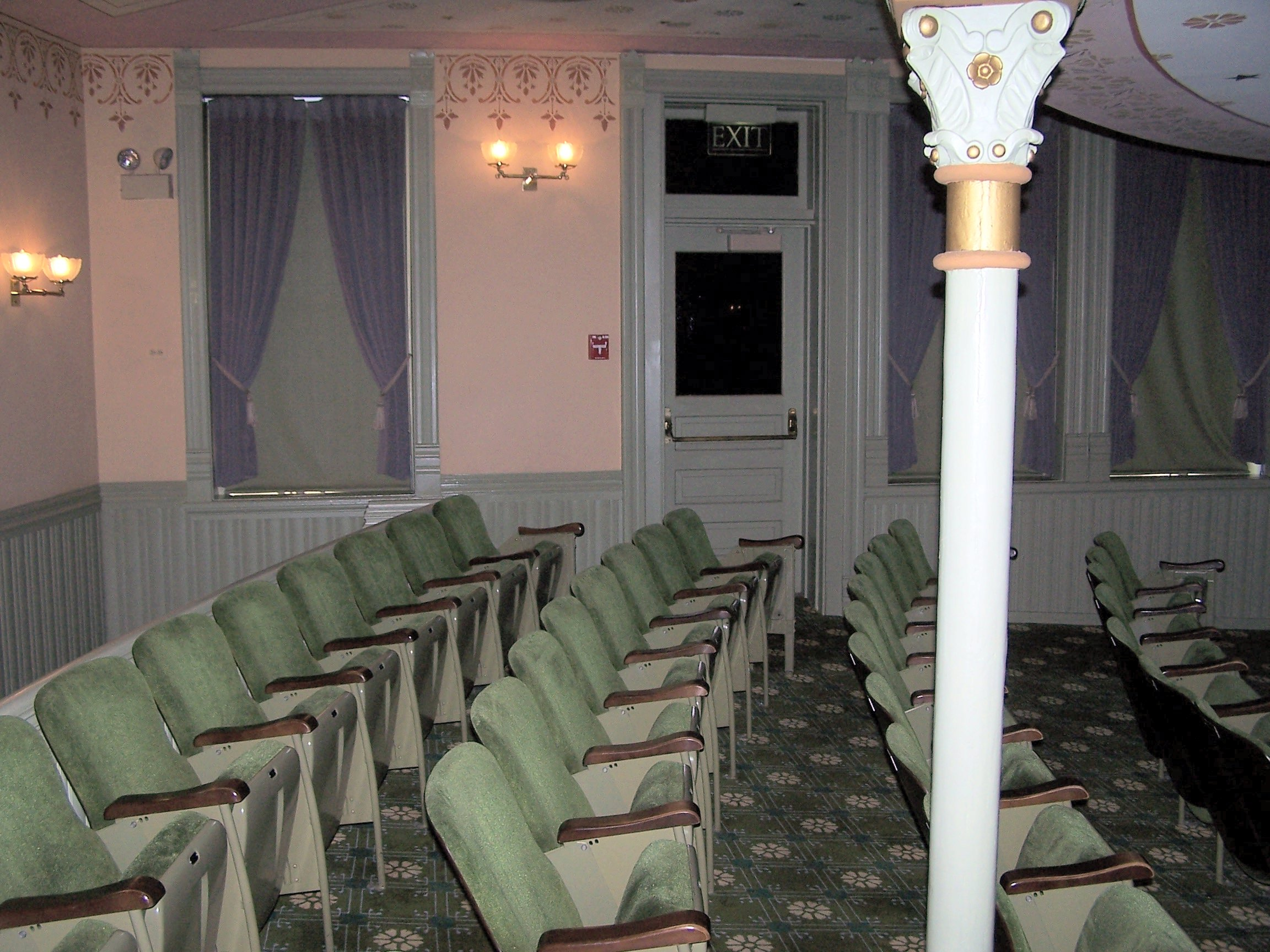
Balcony Seating Area

The Woodstock Opera House hosts a variety of programming and events each year including concerts, theatrical plays, dance, visual arts, educational programming, lectures, meetings, receptions, and more. Situated on the historic square in downtown Woodstock, the Opera House is one of the oldest continuously operating theatres in the country.

The Opera House is a fully modernized theatre while retaining its historical character. It features contemporary sound, lighting, stage rigging, heating, air-conditioning and other amenities and is owned and operated by the City of Woodstock.

== Cinema ==
A scene from Groundhog Day

The venue is featured prominently in the film Groundhog Day (which was filmed primarily in Woodstock) as The Pennsylvanian Hotel.

== See also ==
- Woodstock Mozart Festival
