= Woodstock, Illinois =

- City
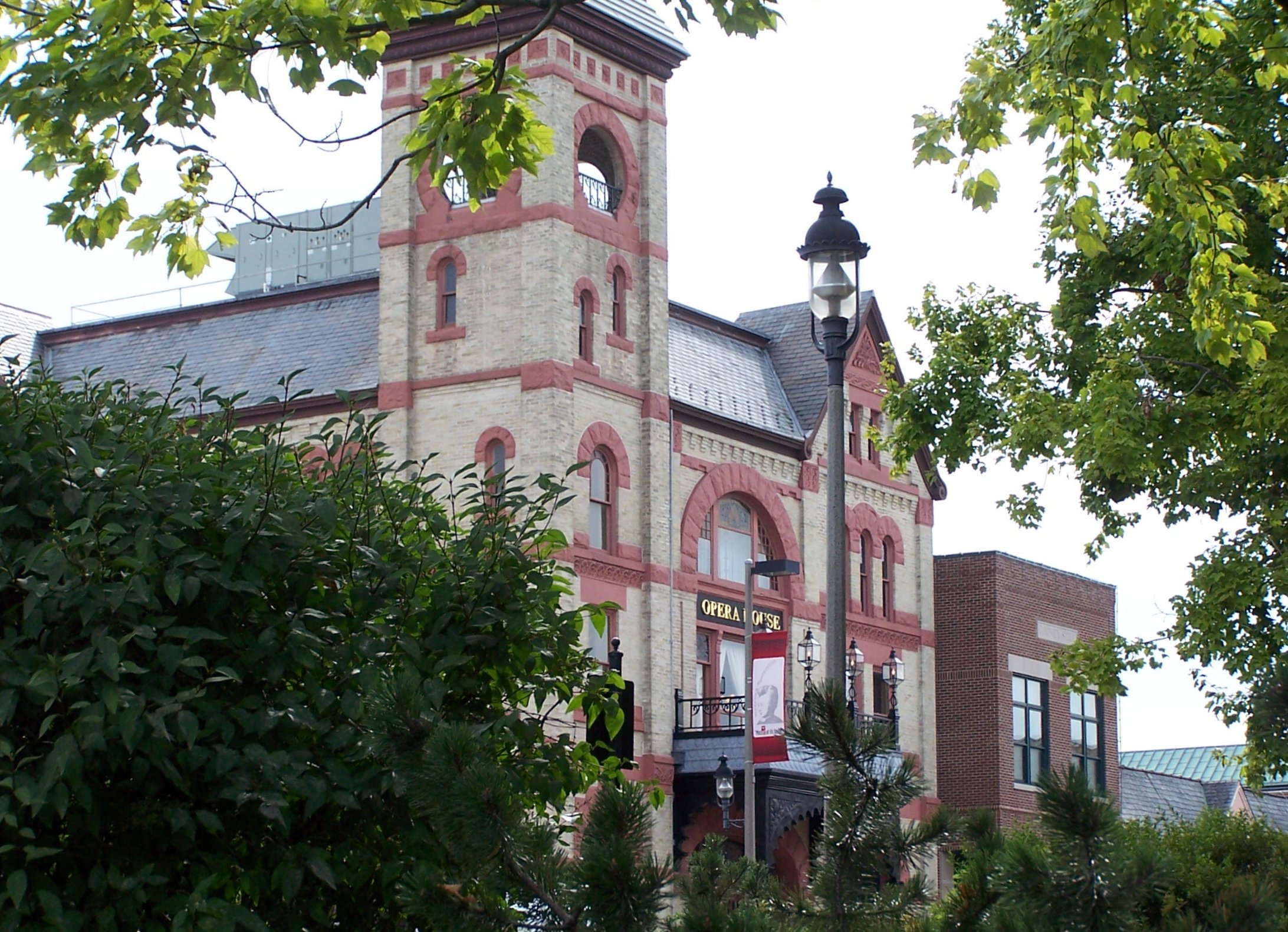
- The landmark Woodstock Opera House building in historic downtown Woodstock

- Flag Seal Logo
- Motto: "True to Its Past; Confident of Its Future"
- Interactive map of Woodstock, Illinois
- Location within Illinois Location within the United States
- Coordinates: 42°18′53″N 88°26′51″W
- Country: United States
- State: Illinois
- County: McHenry
- Townships: Dorr, Greenwood, Hartland, Seneca
- Founded: 1852

Government
  - Mayor: Michael Turner

Area
  - Total: 13.19 sq mi (34.15 km^{2})
  - Land: 13.19 sq mi (34.15 km^{2})
  - Water: 0 sq mi (0.00 km^{2})

Population (2020)
  - Total: 25,630
  - Density: 1,943.6/sq mi (750.41/km^{2})
- Time zone: UTC-6 (CST)
  - Summer (DST): UTC-5 (CDT)
- ZIP Code(s): 60098
- Area codes: 815/779 847/224
- FIPS code: 17-83349
- Wikimedia Commons: Woodstock, Illinois
- Website: www.woodstockil.gov

Woodstock is a city in and the county seat of McHenry County, Illinois, United States. It is located 51 miles (82 km) northwest of Chicago, making it one of the city's outermost suburbs. Per the 2020 census, the population was 25,630. The city's historic downtown district and turn-of-the-century town square is anchored by the landmark Woodstock Opera House and the Old McHenry County Courthouse. In 2007, Woodstock was named one of the nation's Dozen Distinctive Destinations by the National Trust for Historic Preservation.

== History ==
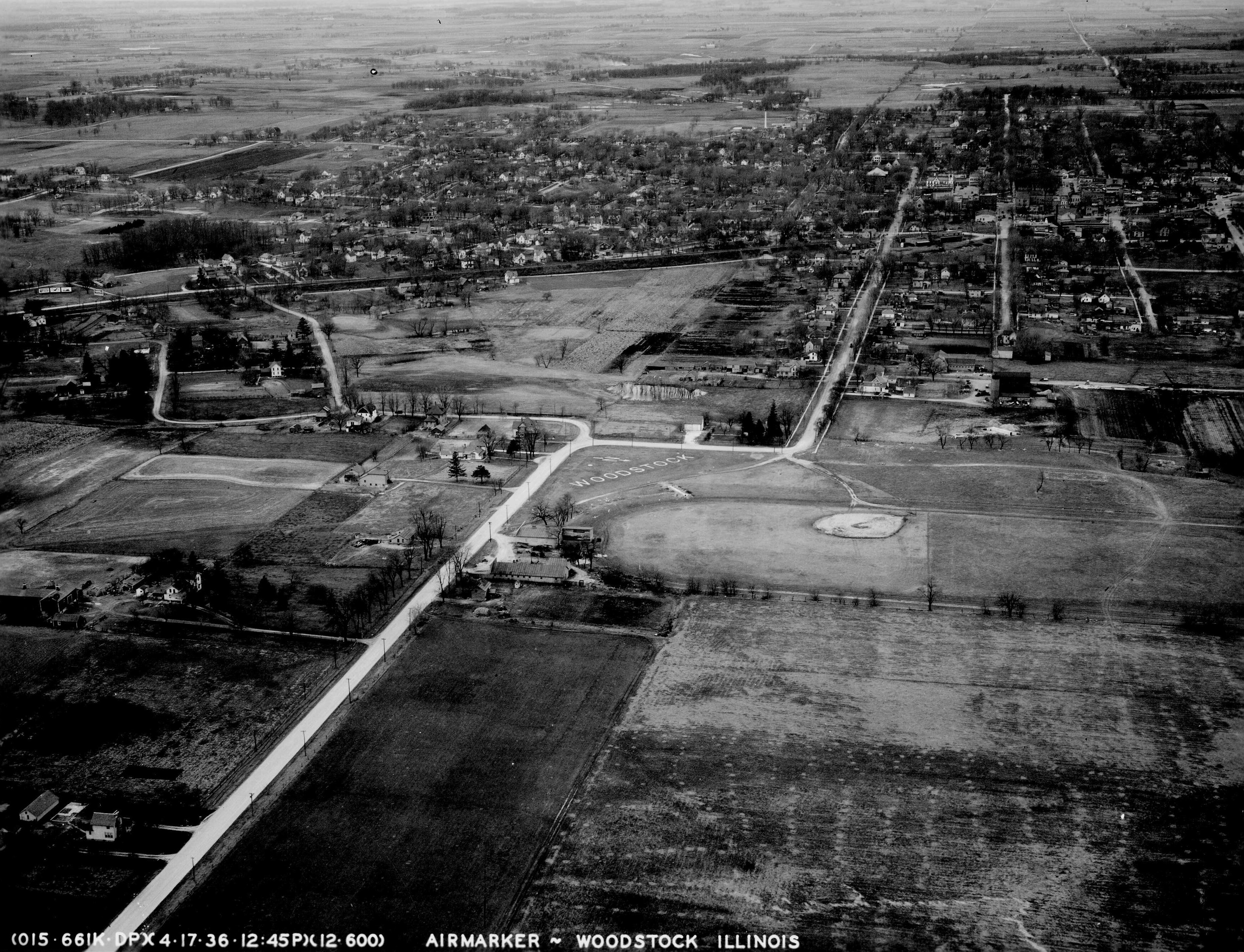
Woodstock in 1936

=== Early days, Centerville ===
Woodstock was originally known as Centerville because of its location at the geographic center of McHenry County. It was chosen as the county seat on September 4, 1843. Early settler Alvin Judd developed a plat for the town, which incorporated a two-acre public square, near which a 2-story frame courthouse and jail were constructed the following year by George C. Dean and Daniel Blair.

In 1845, prominent resident Joel Johnson proposed that Centerville be given a more original name, and the town was renamed Woodstock after Johnson's hometown of Woodstock, Vermont. The town was still listed as "Center" on the 1850 Federal Census. In 1852, Woodstock was incorporated as a village with Judd as president. In response to a growing population following the end of the Civil War, Woodstock was incorporated as a city in 1873.

John S. Wheat was elected as Woodstock's first mayor. A vital artery for the growing town was the train line to and from Chicago, which allowed for a substantial industrial presence early in the town's history.

=== Eugene V. Debs' prison stay ===
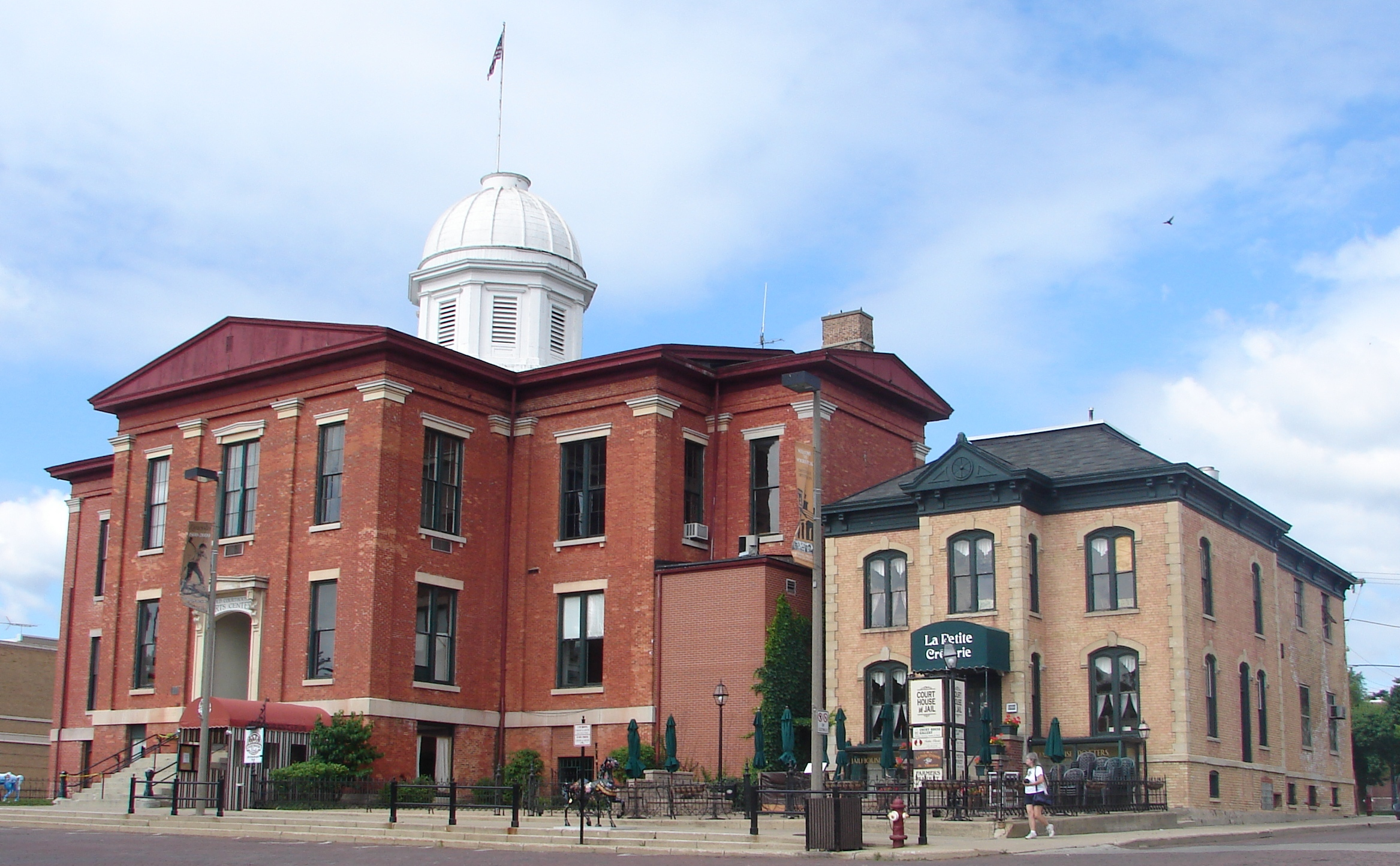
The Old McHenry County Courthouse and jail in Woodstock

In 1895, Eugene V. Debs served a short federal prison sentence in the Woodstock Jail following the 1894 Pullman labor strike in Chicago. Debs, the former president of the American Railway Union, was held in Woodstock instead of Chicago because federal officials feared that he would be surrounded with too many sympathizers in a Chicago prison and therefore could have still incited further unrest. Debs was instead assigned to a cell in the newly constructed Woodstock Jail, which occupied the lowest floor of the Woodstock Courthouse on the town square.

During his time in the jail, Debs received several influential socialist visitors and encountered the works of Karl Marx. He is said to have considered the Woodstock Jail one of the "greatest school[s]," and passed his time reading and writing many letters from his cell. By the time he was released in November 1895 (to great fanfare and before crowds of onlookers assembled in the Woodstock Square), Debs had become a socialist and a national celebrity. He later ran for the United States Presidency five times between 1900 and 1920 as the candidate for the newly formed Social Democratic Party.

=== "Typewriter City" ===
During the early part of the 20th century, Woodstock had become "Typewriter City" and was home to factories of both the Emerson Typewriter Company and the Oliver Typewriter Company. Woodstock workers had built more than half the world's typewriters by 1922. The companies were very much a part of civic life in Woodstock during this time. Both factories had active social clubs, baseball teams that competed against one another, and Emerson had a well-regarded band that played at public events.

In 1919, Emerson Typewriter became the Woodstock Typewriter Company. The city grew and flourished with increasing demand for Woodstock typewriters through and after World War II. Initially the company sold typewriters for use in the war effort both domestically and abroad, but after the war's end returning servicemen, now familiar with the Woodstock brand, chose these models for their households. The factory was in use until 1970, and has since been converted into lofts.

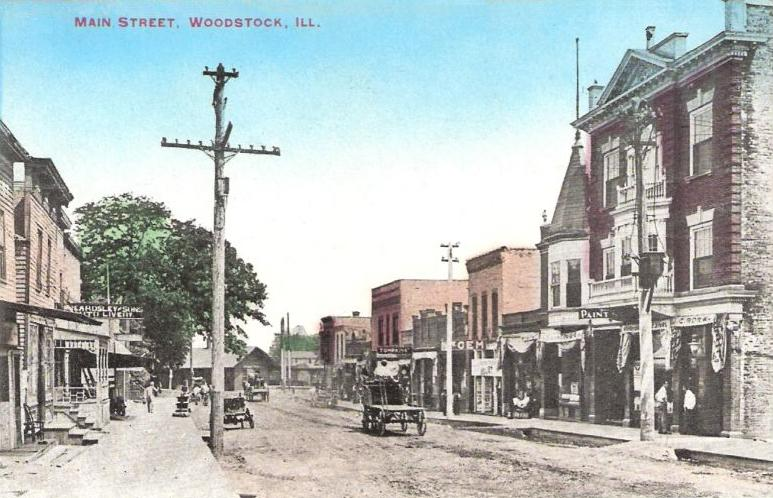
Main Street looking north, circa 1910

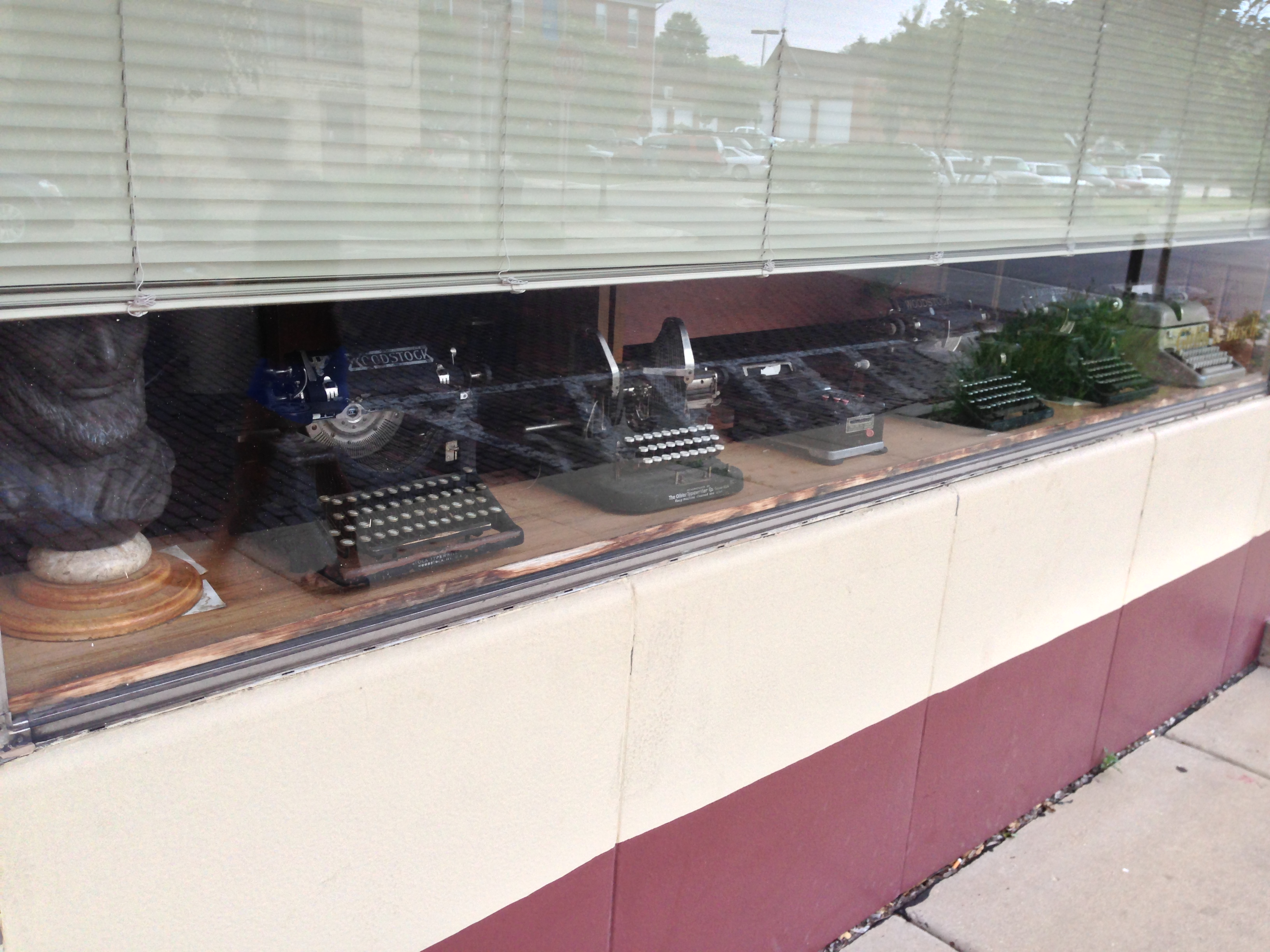
Typewriters in a Woodstock business' window in 2013. Note the name "Woodstock" on some of them.

=== Orson Welles and the Todd School for Boys ===
Woodstock had an important role in the creative development of Orson Welles. In 1926, in the midst of a chaotic upbringing, he enrolled at the Todd School for Boys in Woodstock at age 10. His five-year stay there was his only formal education, and the town and school made an impression on the young Welles. Years later, in 1960, when asked where he thought of as his hometown, he replied "I suppose it's Woodstock, Illinois, if it's anywhere. I went to school there for four years. If I try to think of a home, it's that."

At Todd School, the young Welles came under the positive influence and guidance of Roger Hill, a teacher who later became the school's headmaster. Hill provided Welles with an educational environment that supported his creativity, allowing Welles to concentrate on subjects that interested him. Welles performed and staged his first theatrical experiments and productions at Todd. He also performed at the downtown Woodstock Opera House, where the stage — the site of his American debut as a professional theatre director — is now dedicated to him.

Welles returned to Woodstock periodically after leaving school. In July 1934 at the age of 19, he coordinated the Todd Theatre Festival, a six-week summer festival at the Woodstock Opera House that featured Hilton Edwards and Micheál MacLiammóir of Dublin's Gate Theatre. His short film The Hearts of Age was shot on the Todd School campus during the festival.

Todd School for Boys closed in 1954. Several original buildings were purchased at auction and reused by Marian Central Catholic High School and Christian Life Services. Welles' former dormitory was demolished in 2010.

== Geography ==
In the 2010 census, Woodstock has a total area of 13.55 square miles (35.09 km^{2}), all land.

== Demographics ==
Historical population
Census	Pop.	Note	%±
1860	1,327		—
1870	1,574		18.6%
1880	1,475		−6.3%
1890	1,683		14.1%
1900	2,502		48.7%
1910	4,331		73.1%
1920	5,523		27.5%
1930	5,471		−0.9%
1940	6,123		11.9%
1950	7,192		17.5%
1960	8,897		23.7%
1970	10,226		14.9%
1980	11,725		14.7%
1990	14,353		22.4%
2000	20,151		40.4%
2010	24,770		22.9%
2020	25,630		3.5%
U.S. Decennial Census; 2010 2020

=== Racial and ethnic composition ===
Woodstock city, Illinois – Racial and ethnic composition Note: the US Census treats Hispanic/Latino as an ethnic category. This table excludes Latinos from the racial categories and assigns them to a separate category. Hispanics/Latinos may be of any race.
Race / Ethnicity (NH = Non-Hispanic)	Pop 2000	Pop 2010	Pop 2020	% 2000	% 2010	% 2020
White alone (NH)	15,511	17,748	16,456	76.97%	70.56%	64.21%
Black or African American alone (NH)	195	513	737	0.97%	2.07%	2.88%
Native American or Alaska Native alone (NH)	30	40	33	0.15%	0.16%	0.13%
Asian alone (NH)	400	562	527	1.99%	2.27%	2.06%
Pacific Islander alone (NH)	0	15	2	0.00%	0.06%	0.01%
Other race alone (NH)	20	16	106	0.10%	0.06%	0.41%
Mixed race or Multiracial (NH)	165	294	860	0.82%	1.19%	3.36%
Hispanic or Latino (any race)	3,830	5,852	6,909	19.01%	23.63%	26.96%
Total	20,151	24,770	25,630	100.00%	100.00%	100.00%

=== 2020 census ===
As of the 2020 census, Woodstock had a population of 25,630. The median age was 38.1 years. 23.0% of residents were under the age of 18 and 15.0% of residents were 65 years of age or older. For every 100 females there were 97.4 males, and for every 100 females age 18 and over there were 95.5 males age 18 and over.

96.8% of residents lived in urban areas, while 3.2% lived in rural areas.

There were 9,807 households in Woodstock, of which 32.3% had children under the age of 18 living in them. Of all households, 46.5% were married-couple households, 17.8% were households with a male householder and no spouse or partner present, and 27.8% were households with a female householder and no spouse or partner present. About 28.8% of all households were made up of individuals and 11.8% had someone living alone who was 65 years of age or older.

There were 10,352 housing units, of which 5.3% were vacant. The homeowner vacancy rate was 1.5% and the rental vacancy rate was 5.5%.

Racial composition as of the 2020 census
Race	Number	Percent
White	17,728	69.2%
Black or African American	773	3.0%
American Indian and Alaska Native	229	0.9%
Asian	535	2.1%
Native Hawaiian and Other Pacific Islander	3	0.0%
Some other race	3,295	12.9%
Two or more races	3,067	12.0%
Hispanic or Latino (of any race)	6,909	27.0%

=== 2000 census ===
In the 2000 census, there were 20,151 people, 7,273 households, and 4,843 families in the city. The population density was 1,891.1 inhabitants per square mile (730.2/km^{2}). There were 7,599 housing units at an average density of 713.1 per square mile (275.3/km^{2}). The racial makeup of the city was 87.48% White, 1.06% African American, 0.23% Native American, 2.01% Asian, 7.69% from other races, and 1.52% from two or more races. Hispanic or Latino of any race were 19.01% of the population.

There were 7,273 households, out of which 37.5% had children under the age of 18 living with them, 52.7% were married couples living together, 9.7% had a female householder with no husband present, and 33.4% were non-families. 27.3% of all households were made up of individuals, and 9.2% had someone living alone who was 65 years of age or older. The average household size was 2.68 and the average family size was 3.30.

In the city, the population was spread out, with 27.9% under the age of 18, 10.2% from 18 to 24, 33.2% from 25 to 44, 18.9% from 45 to 64, and 9.8% who were 65 years of age or older. The median age was 32 years. For every 100 females, there were 100.8 males. For every 100 females age 18 and over, there were 98.5 males.

The median income for a household in the city was $47,871, and the median income for a family was $54,408. Males had a median income of $40,137 versus $27,264 for females. The per capita income for the city was $23,210. About 5.3% of families and 7.2% of the population were below the poverty line, including 8.0% of those under age 18 and 3.0% of those age 65 or over.

== Local culture ==
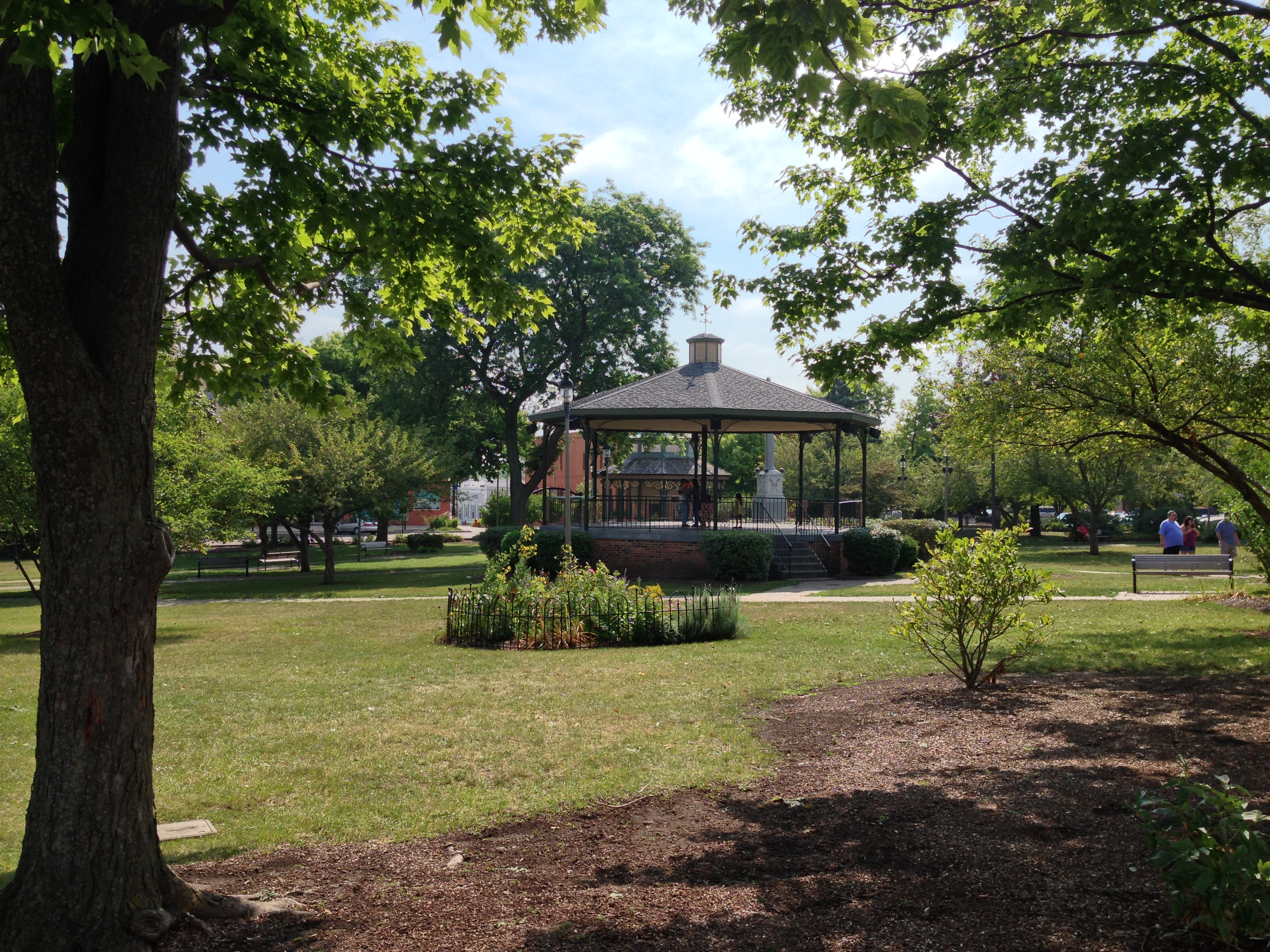
The bandstand in the center of the Woodstock Square

=== Local newspaper ===
The Woodstock Independent is the award-winning local paper of record and is delivered weekly to subscribers. Published on Wednesdays, The Independent covers community news, events as well as local government and schools. The Independent also publishes The Torch, a feature-oriented magazine delivered free to all Woodstock residents 8 or 9 times a year.

=== Music ===
Woodstock has become an important destination for live music in McHenry County and the region with venues featuring local, national, and international artists.

A number of organizations support and promote live music in Woodstock:

- Jazz on the Square
- Liquid Blues
- Off Square Music
- Woodstock Community Orchestra
- Woodstock Opera House
- Woodstock Folk Festival
- Woodstock City Band
- Woodstock Community Choir
- Warp Corps

The historical Woodstock Opera House greeted Woodstock Mozart Festival until 2015. There is a large music program at Woodstock schools and there are three district-wide school music festivals each year.

=== Religion ===
Woodstock is home to many Protestant and Catholic churches, a Jewish congregation and The Blue Lotus Buddhist Temple since 2002.

=== Roles in popular media ===
==== Planes, Trains and Automobiles, 1987 ====
Several scenes in the 1987 film Planes, Trains, and Automobiles were shot in Woodstock, including the scene in which the protagonists' rental car is towed in front of a building, the old Courthouse. The movie brought Woodstock to the attention of location manager Bob Hudgins, who later recommended the town to Harold Ramis for the filming of Groundhog Day.

==== Groundhog Day, 1993 ====
Woodstock is perhaps most famous for its role as the location for the 1993 movie Groundhog Day, starring Bill Murray. Although the story is set in Punxsutawney, Pennsylvania, the movie's producers preferred the quintessentially American, but non-specific backdrop of Woodstock Square and its surroundings. Outdoor and street scenes were filmed around the downtown and various side streets, and signs from stores and businesses are visible throughout the movie.

Many notable scenes' locations are commemorated with plaques as part of a walking tour for visitors and enthusiasts. In January 2020, several key actors, including Bill Murray, Brian Doyle-Murray and Stephen Tobolowsky returned to Woodstock to film a Groundhog Day-themed commercial for Jeep. The commercial aired during the 2020 Super Bowl.

==== Other ====
Woodstock was the basis for the fictional town of Hawkins Falls in the 1950s television soap opera Hawkins Falls, Population 6200. The city was the site of primary filming for the movie Bored Silly, which was released in 2000. In August 2018, it was reported that filming had begun in and around the Square for the 2019 HBO series Lovecraft Country from producers J. J. Abrams, Jordan Peele, Misha Green and Ben Stephenson. A map of Woodstock can be seen on the splash screen for The Jackbox Party Pack 4 game Civic Doodle where the historic square and Illinois route 47 and 120 are clearly visible.

In September 2021, a second commercial began filming in Woodstock, including the Woodstock Square and the surrounding areas, for Toyota, which began airing on television later that December.

Woodstock was also a primary filming location for the Amazon series Night Sky doubling as the fictional Farnsworth, Illinois.

== Economy ==
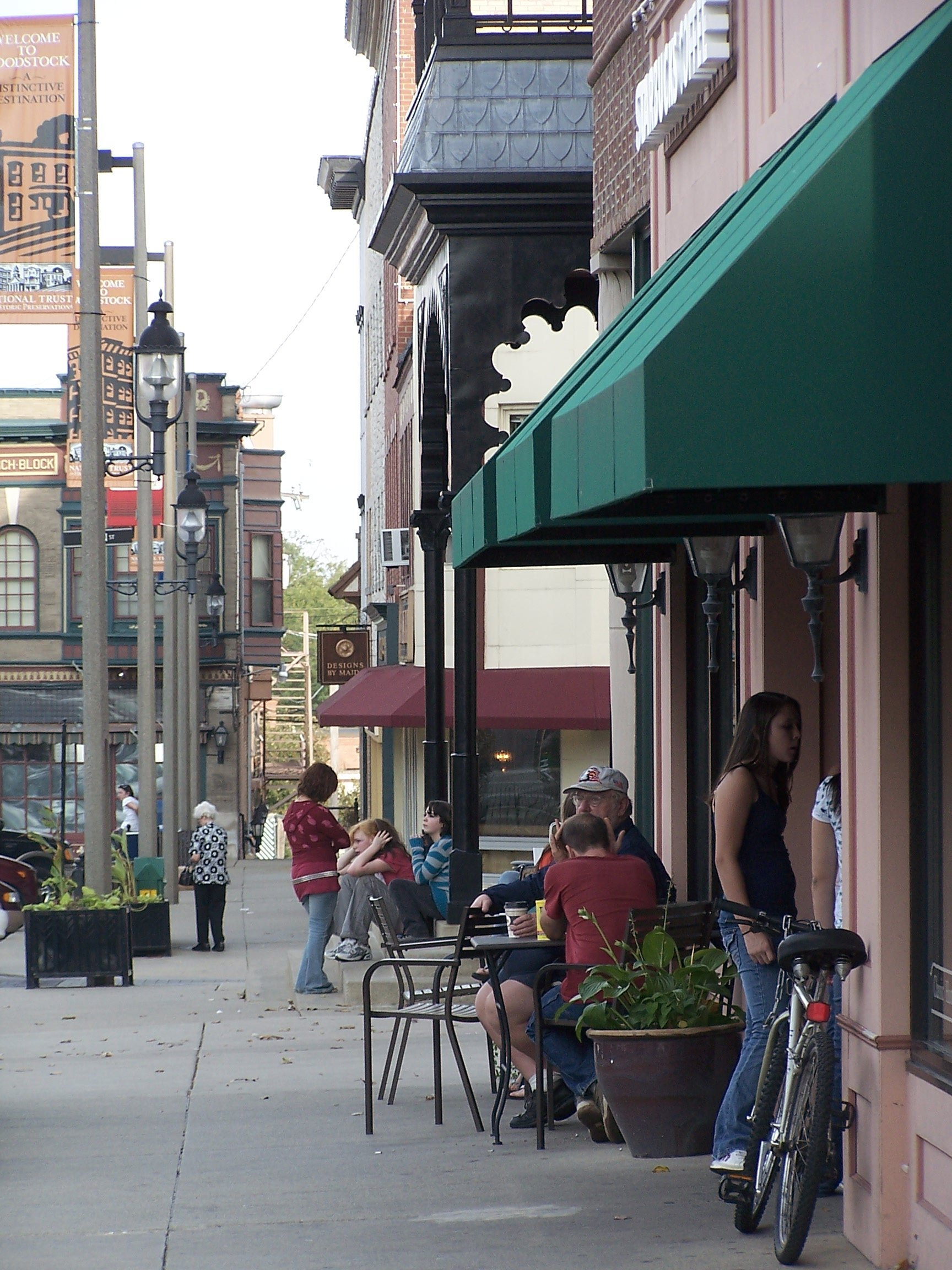
Shopping on Woodstock's Historic Square

=== Top employers ===
According to Woodstock's 2025 Comprehensive Annual Financial Report, the top employers in the city are:

#	Employer	# of Employees
1	Woodstock Community Unit School District 200	1,304
2	McHenry County	1,260
3	Northwestern Medicine	395
4	Woodstock Sterile Solutions	392
5	Claussen Pickle Company	325
6	Walmart	300
7	Charter Dura-Bar	290
8	City of Woodstock	250
9	Wolf Distribution	142
10	The Arnold Engineering Company	100

== Transportation ==
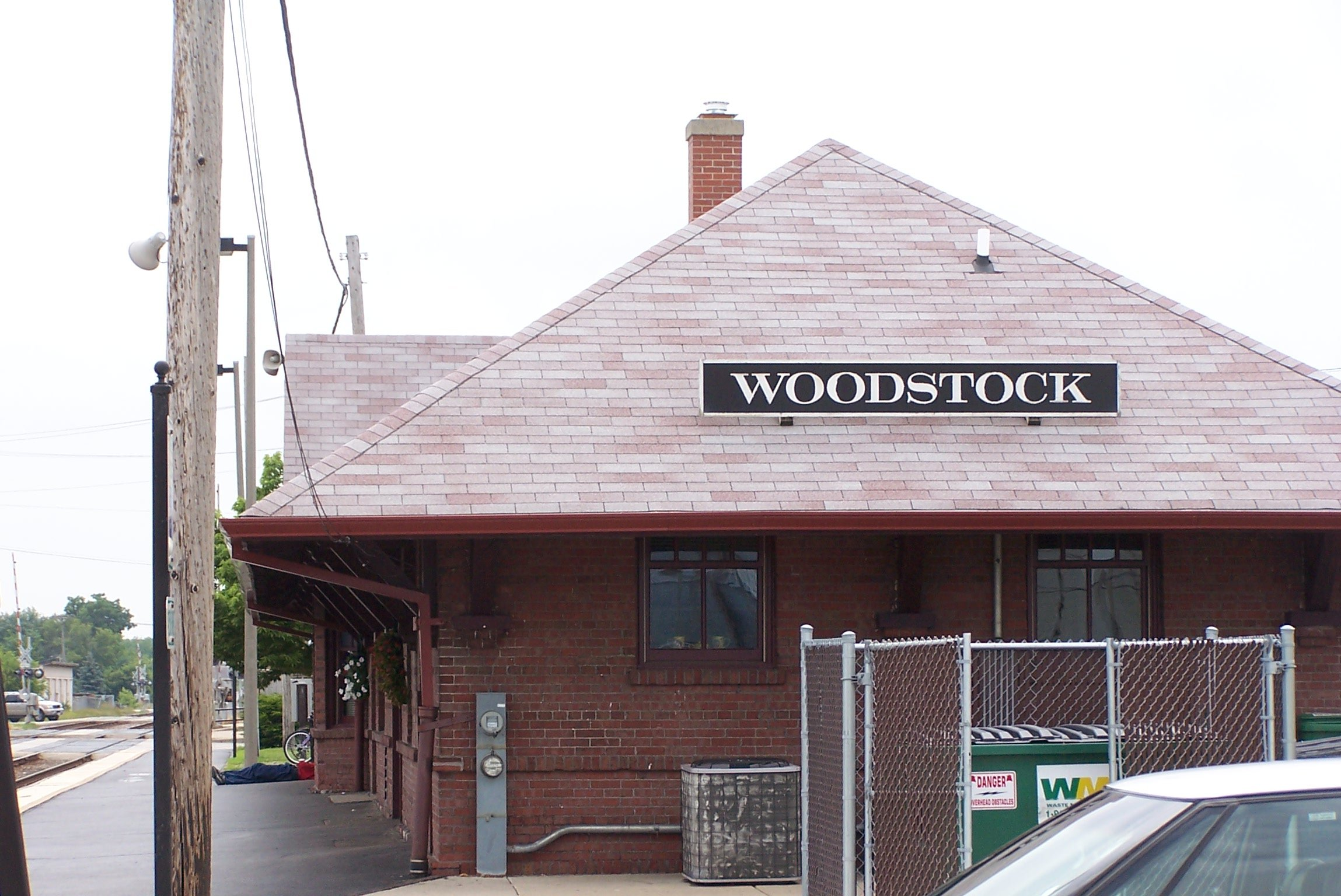
Woodstock station

=== Public transit ===
Woodstock station is the penultimate passenger stop on Metra's Union Pacific Northwest Line, which originates from Ogilvie Transportation Center in downtown Chicago and ends in Harvard, Illinois. At Woodstock, Metra offers passengers 14 daily trains to Chicago on weekdays, with 13 returning outbound. Between 400 and 500 passengers use the train daily for travel to Chicago or other suburban communities along the line.

This direct link to the city was historically instrumental in Woodstock's growth as a city, and remains an attractive option for local commuters and residents to reach Chicago. As a result, Woodstock's use of the system is greater than that of nearly half of the Metra system's other outlying stations, many of which serve larger or geographically nearer communities.

Other public ground transportation is limited to Pace Suburban Bus route 807, which connects downtown Woodstock with downtown McHenry.

=== Major roads ===
U.S. Route 14 once took drivers through the heart of downtown Woodstock, but a bypass now curves around the city's southwest border. Illinois Route 47 runs through the city in the north–south direction. Illinois Route 120's western terminus is in northwest Woodstock, and continues east past Woodstock's downtown and into rural McHenry County.

== Education ==
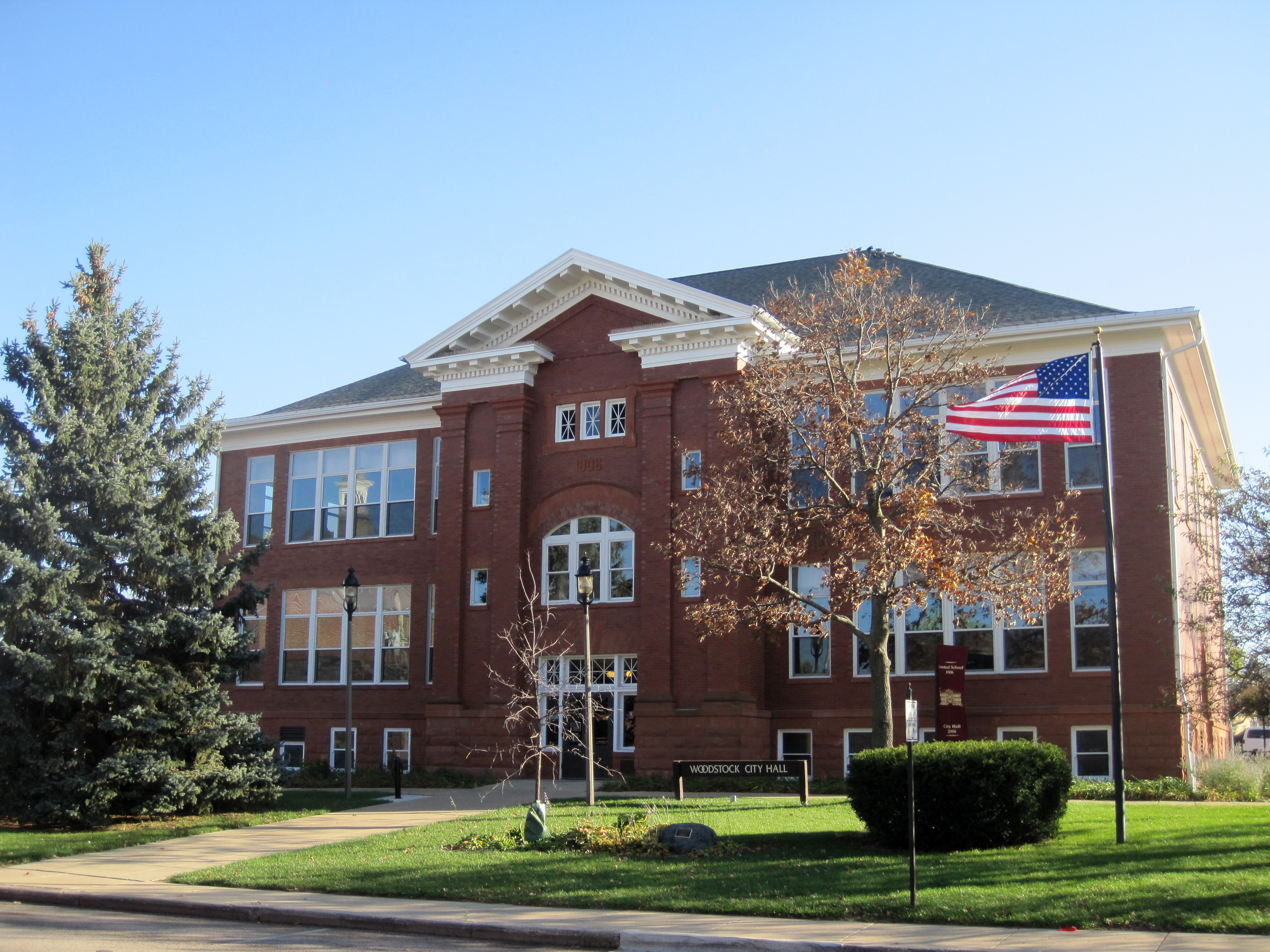
Old high school and now the city hall

Woodstock's public schools are part of Woodstock Community Unit School District 200, which was formed in 1969. The district operates 1 early learning center (Verda Dierzen), 6 elementary schools (Dean Street, Greenwood, Mary Endres, Olson, Prairiewood and Westwood), two middle schools (Northwood and Creekside) and two high schools (Woodstock High School and Woodstock North High School). The three newest buildings, Prairiewood, Creekside and WNHS, were approved in a March 2006 referendum to address crowding in schools due to the area's growth between the mid-1990s and 2008.

Woodstock is served by private educational institutions: St. Mary Catholic grade school (K-8) is located in town. Students often continue on to Marian Central Catholic High School, also located in Woodstock.

Residents pursuing an associate degree normally do so at McHenry County College in neighboring Crystal Lake. Loyola University Chicago owns and operates a large property on Woodstock's eastern edge as its Retreat and Ecology Campus. Aurora University also operates its Woodstock Center downtown.

== Notable people ==
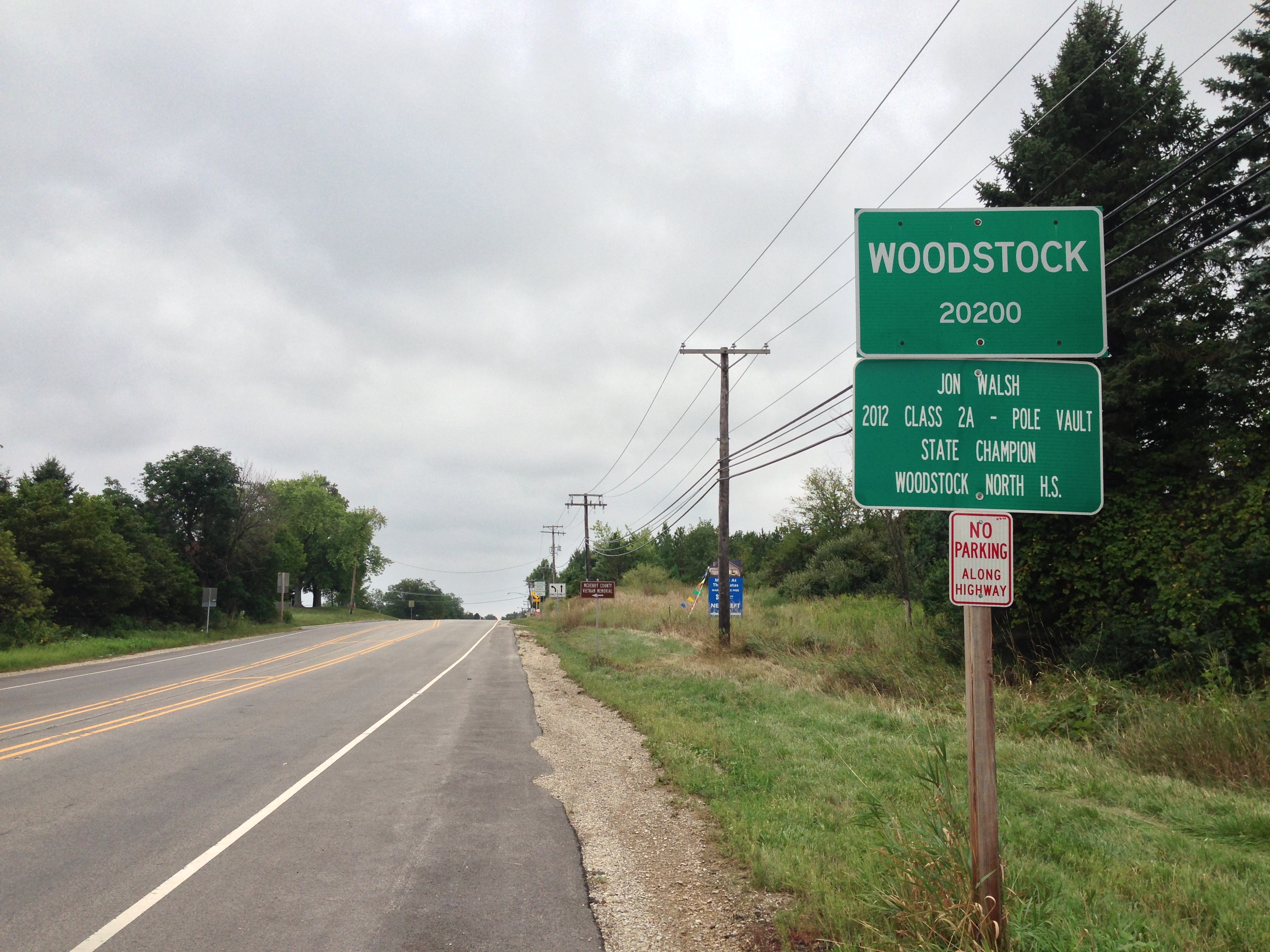
A road sign announcing entry into Woodstock

- Jack Allen, professional baseball infielder for the Syracuse Stars and the Cleveland Blues
- Jessica Biel, actress and model
- Bob Bird, Alaskan pro-life and political activist, first Distinguished Alumnus of Marian Central.
- Cyrus Allen Black, taxidermist, decoy-maker and minor league baseball player
- Michael J. Brown, Illinois state representative and businessman
- Bryan Bulaga, football player, University of Iowa and Green Bay Packers
- Rick Fletcher, illustrator and cartoonist with Chicago Tribune
- Gigi Goode, American drag queen and contestant on RuPaul's Drag Race (season 12)
- Chester Gould, cartoonist and the creator of the Dick Tracy comic strip
- Brad S. Gregory, Professor of History at the University of Notre Dame
- Nikol Hasler, author, sexual educator, internet personality
- Ann Hughes, Illinois state representative
- Marcellus L. Joslyn, businessman
- Rich Loiselle, pitcher for the Pittsburgh Pirates
- Dana Nafziger, football player
- Doug Oberhelman, CEO, Caterpillar Inc.
- Scott Sobkowiak, pitcher for the Atlanta Braves
- Barbara Stcherbatcheff, best-selling author and economic commentator
- Lynn D. Stewart, Illini star player from the 1960s
- Johnny Stompanato, mob associate of Mickey Cohen
- Earl Dennison Thomas, US Army brigadier general
- Michele Weiner-Davis, marriage therapist and author
- Orson Welles, director, writer, actor, producer
