= WKPT =

WKPT may refer to:

- WKPT (AM), a radio station (1400 AM) licensed to Kingsport, Tennessee, United States
- WTFM, a radio station (98.5 FM) licensed to Kingsport, Tennessee, United States, formerly called WKPT-FM
- WKPT-TV, a television station (channel 32, virtual 19) licensed to Kingsport, Tennessee, United States
