= WHHQ =

Radio station in Elizabethton, Tennessee (1964–2006)

- Elizabethton, Tennessee; United States
- Frequency: 1520 kHz

Programming
- Format: Classic country

Ownership
- Owner: Mediatrix SC, Inc.

History
- First air date: November 11, 1964; 61 years ago
- Last air date: April 29, 2006; 20 years ago
- Former call signs: WIDD (1964–1988); WITM (1988–1995); WKPP (1995–1998)

Technical information
- Facility ID: 24624
- Power: 1,000 watts daytime; 500 watts critical hours
- Transmitter coordinates: 36°21′32″N 82°13′53″W

WHHQ was a radio station that broadcast at 1520 kHz in Elizabethton, Tennessee, United States. The station was last owned by Mediatrix SC, Inc., and operated from November 11, 1964, to April 29, 2006.

== History ==
=== WIDD: Early years ===
WIDD signed on November 11, 1964. The station was originally owned by the Holston Broadcasting Corporation, broadcasting on 1520 with 1,000 watts daytime and 500 watts in critical hours. The station was acquired in 1973 from its original ownership by Landcare, Inc. principals J. H. Lewis and Edward H. Davis, along with WLSN-FM 99.3 (changed to WIDD-FM in 1975), though Lewis had owned part of Holston since the station signed on the air. Landcare, whose other holdings included car washes, a beverage distributor and a hotel in Illinois, was forced into involuntary bankruptcy by its creditors in 1975, and a federal bankruptcy judge ordered in March 1976 that the stations be sold. Metro Broadcasting Corporation bought WIDD-AM-FM that October for $250,000. WIDD AM had been programming country music prior to the sale to Metro and remained in the format while WIDD-FM played gospel music and religious programming. One of its songs, however, would cause a legal furor. A local artist wrote "The Ballad of Jarvis Stout", about the drunk driving arrest of a local constable; alleging the invasion of his privacy, the fact that WIDD aired the song as its "Pick Hit of the Week" (whereas WBEJ refused to air it), and the fact that the publicity around the case prompted a mistrial, he sued WIDD and others involved in the creation of the song for $300,000.

=== Southern Signal years, bankruptcy and FDIC operation ===
WIDD-AM-FM was sold in 1981 to attorney H. Curtis Williams and Gene Artrip, doing business as Southern Signal Corporation, for $400,000. The new owners flipped WIDD-FM to album-oriented rock and moved its former religious programming to the AM station. The change did not last, and within a year, WIDD was back to country music, though this time it played a blend of 1950s and 1960s oldies music and current country artists, calling itself "Country Rockin' WIDD-AM15". That format did not last, and by 1983 the station had flipped to adult standards.

Southern Signal's financial condition began to deteriorate after two years on the air, largely because the station was indebted when the company acquired the stations. Late in 1983, WIDD-FM was sold off to the owner of WJSO. On March 1, 1984, the Watauga Valley Bank seized the station after defaulting on a $225,000 loan. Other creditors included United Press International, Broadcast Music, Inc., and United Telephone. The bank, however, was in its own dire straits. On April 6, the Tennessee banking commissioner shut down the financial institution, with the Federal Deposit Insurance Corporation taking control of Watauga Valley's assets. This put the FDIC in the highly unusual position of running a radio station, though a thunderstorm in late May or early June destroyed the WIDD transmitter and plunged the station into a silence that would last nearly two years. The owner of the Elizabethton Star newspaper attempted to buy the station but was told by the Federal Communications Commission that he could not own both the newspaper and WIDD.

=== Return to air and change to WITM ===
Michael B. Glinter acquired the station at the end of 1985 and returned WIDD to air in March 1986. Among the air staff of the relaunched station was Lee Brown, who had previously been at WIDD from 1964 to 1981 and had worked at WBEJ before then. On August 22, 1986, at 12:40 p.m., Brown was on the air when he suffered a heart attack and died in the studio at the age of 61. Glinter resold WIDD in 1987 to Dale Miller and Gary Ward for $165,000. The new ownership flipped the station from gospel music to easy listening and changed the call letters to WITM ("In Tennessee's Mountains") on April 26, 1988; the new call letters and music format coincided with James Chambers, a Navy veteran who had lost his eyesight while serving, taking over as general manager. WITM changed formats again, this time to Christian programming and southern gospel music, in 1991; the programming was simulcast from WBCV in Bristol, Virginia.

=== WKPP ===
By 1993, however, WITM had gone silent again. That July, the Holston Valley Broadcasting Corporation—owners of WKPT, WTFM, and WKPT-TV in Kingsport as well as WKTP in Jonesborough—filed to buy the inactive station from Good Shepherd Broadcasting—owned by interests that had bought out Miller and Ward over the late 80s—for $11,200, claiming that WITM's poor financial status made it a failed station which they could own. The FCC approved the sale in June 1995 over objections by WBEJ that the acquisition would give Holston Valley too many outlets. The station became WKPP in 1995, run in a cooperative venture where Holston Valley supplied WKPT Radio Network programming, while WBEJ sold the station's advertising and handled operations. The station originally had an adult contemporary "mature music" format, though by 1998 it had changed to all-news.

=== WHHQ ===
In 1999, the St. Thomas More Broadcasting Association acquired WKPP for $65,000; the call letters officially changed to WHHQ on December 8, 1998. The change coincided with the station beginning to broadcast Catholic programming as Queen of Peace Catholic Radio; the licensee name changed to Mediatrix SC, Inc., in 2004. The station was off air for a time but returned in September 2005 as a classic country-formatted station operated by G&G Broadcasting.

Citing a dispute with a party that held a time brokerage agreement with Mediatrix, the licensee received special temporary authority to take WHHQ silent, as of April 29, 2006. Though Mediatrix claimed it had found a buyer for the station, no application to sell the station was ever filed; the license was marked as deleted by the FCC as of April 27, 2007, for failure to broadcast over 12 months.
