= WAPK-CD =

Television station in Kingsport, Tennessee

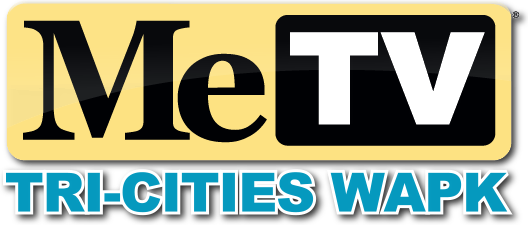
- Kingsport–Johnson City–; Bristol, Tennessee; Bristol, Virginia; United States
- City: Kingsport, Tennessee
- Channels: Digital: 16 (UHF); Virtual: 36
- Branding: MeTV Tri-Cities WAPK

Programming
- Affiliations: 36.1: MeTV; for others, see § Subchannels

Ownership
- Owner: Glenwood Communications Corporation; (Holston Valley Broadcasting Corporation)
- Sister stations: WKPT-TV, WTFM, WRZK, WVEK-FM, WMEV-FM, WKPT, WOPI & WKTP

History
- First air date: April 30, 1989
- Former call signs: W30AP (1989–1995); WAPK-LP (1995–2002); WAPK-CA (2002–2014)
- Former channel numbers: Analog: 30 (UHF, 1991–2002), 36 (UHF, 2002–2014); Digital: 36 (UHF, 2014-2019)
- Former affiliations: Independent (1989–1995); UPN (1995–2006); MyNetworkTV (2006–2016); Laff (DT3, 201?-2017)
- Call sign meaning: "WAP" from former W30AP calls; Kingsport

Technical information
- Licensing authority: FCC
- Facility ID: 77677
- Class: CD
- ERP: 13 kW
- HAAT: 665.4 m (2,183 ft)
- Transmitter coordinates: 36°25′53″N 82°8′15″W

Links
- Public license information: Public file; LMS
- Website: wapk.tv

WAPK-CD (channel 36) is a low-power, Class A television station licensed to Kingsport, Tennessee, United States, serving the Tri-Cities area as an affiliate of MeTV. It is owned by Glenwood Communications Corporation alongside Cozi TV affiliate WKPT-TV (channel 19) and several radio stations. All of the stations share studios on Commerce Street in downtown Kingsport; WAPK-CD's transmitter is located on Holston High Point at Holston Mountain in the Cherokee National Forest.

Due to its low-power status, the broadcasting radius does not reach all of the Tri-Cities area. Therefore, the station is simulcast in 16:9 widescreen standard definition on WKPT's second digital subchannel in order to reach the entire market. This relay signal can be seen on channel 19.2 from the same transmitter facility.

== History ==
WAPK began service on April 30, 1989, as W30AP, identified on-air as "WAP-TV". Programming was standard independent fare with classic television sitcoms, sports, old movies, and cartoons plus repeats of WKPT's newscasts. On January 16, 1995, WAP became a charter affiliate of UPN. Shortly afterward, W30AP was renamed WAPK-LP in April 1995. In May 2002, the station attained Class A status and changed to the call sign WAPK-CA. In 2003, WAPK moved from UHF channel 30 to channel 36. WAPK became a MyNetworkTV affiliate at the network's inception on September 5, 2006. In recent years, WAPK has been carried on cable in Harlan, Kentucky, which is within the Knoxville media market. The station was issued its license for digital operation on October 10, 2014, at which point it changed its call sign to WAPK-CD.

Following the announcement that WKPT-TV would lose its ABC affiliation to the DT2 subchannel of WJHL-TV, it was announced that much of WAPK's programming, including MyNetworkTV, would move to WKPT-TV, and that WAPK would switch to programming from a digital network, later revealed to be MeTV, WJHL-DT2's former affiliation. The switch over took place on February 1, 2016. The station's fourth channel is expected to carry Heroes & Icons. After WKPT-TV dropped MyNetworkTV in favor of Cozi TV, the Laff affiliation was transferred from WAPK-CD's third subchannel to WKPT's third subchannel (which had previously carried Cozi TV); the move came as a result of Holston Valley Broadcasting opting to refocus WKPT and WAPK entirely around "nostalgia-based programming", stating that MeTV outrates ABC Tri-Cities in most time periods. The CD3 subchannel then subsequently became an affiliate of Bounce TV, a TV network targeting an African-American audiences.

== Technical information ==
=== Subchannels ===
The station's signal is multiplexed:

Subchannels of WAPK-CD
Channel	Res.	Short name	Programming
36.1	720p	MeTV	MeTV
36.2	480i	Grit	Grit
36.3	480i	Bounce	Bounce TV
36.4	480i	Heroes	Heroes & Icons
36.4	Audio only	1490	WOPI (Sports)
36.5	Audio only	1590	WKTP (Sports)

=== Translators ===
The station can also be seen on these repeaters. The main signal on channel 16 is the origination for many of the cable companies that carry WAPK. Holston also uses the signal as the source for all of WAPK's channels via a series of ATSC receivers that directly feed the transmitters.

- WKIN-CD 7 Kingsport
- WKPZ-CD 19 Kingsport
