= WCYB-TV =

Television station in Bristol, Virginia

- Bristol, Virginia; Bristol–Johnson City–; Kingsport, Tennessee; United States
- City: Bristol, Virginia
- Channels: Digital: 35 (UHF); Virtual: 5
- Branding: WCYB-TV 5; News 5; Tri-Cities CW (5.2); Fox 39 Tri-Cities (5.3)

Programming
- Affiliations: 5.1: NBC; 5.2: The CW; 5.3: Fox

Ownership
- Owner: Sinclair Broadcast Group; (Sinclair Media Licensee, LLC)
- Sister stations: WEMT

History
- First air date: August 13, 1956
- Former channel numbers: Analog: 5 (VHF, 1956–2009); Digital: 28 (UHF, 2000–2009), 5 (VHF, 2009–2022)
- Former affiliations: ABC (secondary, 1956–1969); The WB (CYB.WB and 5.2, 1999–2006)
- Call sign meaning: City of Bristol, from WCYB radio

Technical information
- Licensing authority: FCC
- Facility ID: 2455
- ERP: 1,000 kW
- HAAT: 755 m (2,477 ft)
- Transmitter coordinates: 36°26′58.2″N 82°6′28.7″W

Links
- Public license information: Public file; LMS
- Website: wcyb.com

WCYB-TV (channel 5) is a television station in Bristol, Virginia, United States, serving the Tri-Cities area as an affiliate of NBC, The CW and Fox. It is owned by Sinclair Broadcast Group alongside Greeneville, Tennessee–licensed WEMT (channel 39). The two stations share studios on Lee Street in Bristol, Virginia; WCYB-TV's transmitter is located at Rye Patch Knob on Holston Mountain in the Cherokee National Forest.

After a four-year fight for the channel between Bristol, Virginia, radio station WCYB and the owners of WOPI in Bristol, Tennessee, WCYB-TV began broadcasting in August 1956. It was an NBC affiliate from the start and split ABC programming until WKPT-TV began broadcasting in 1969. WCYB was the first television station to multicast more than one major network when it began digital service in 2000. WCYB-TV has generally led WJHL-TV (channel 11) in the market's news ratings in its history.

== History ==
=== Construction and early years ===
One VHF television station assignment, channel 5, was made available by the Federal Communications Commission (FCC) for use in either Bristol, Virginia, or Bristol, Tennessee, when the commission ended its years-long freeze on TV station grants in 1952. A consortium of four Bristol businessmen—Robert Smith, J. Fey Rogers (sales manager of WOPI radio in Bristol, Tennessee), Charles M. Gore and Harry M. Daniel—filed for the channel at Bristol, Tennessee, along with the Appalachian Television Company, owners of WCYB radio (690 AM, now WZAP), for a station on the Virginia side of the state line. The initial studio for WCYB-TV was planned for the first floor of the Hotel General Shelby (home to WCYB radio), at Cumberland and Front streets, with a full-power transmitter to be located on Brumley Mountain, 1,964 feet (599 m) above average terrain in the Jefferson National Forest, 20 miles (32 km) northeast of Bristol.

WOPI's group, the Tri-Cities Television Corporation, broadened to take in Kingsport radio station WKPT, with plans for studios in both cities. A comparative hearing was held between July and September 1954, producing approximately 7,000 pages of testimony. On diversity of ownership grounds, FCC hearing examiner Isadore Honig found in favor of WCYB's bid in January 1955. She felt that while WOPI and WKPT had better civic involvement and programming and studio proposals, Appalachian was more likely to deliver on its "more modest" plans because of a high integration of ownership and management. The initial decision was appealed to the full commission, which in April 1956 ruled in favor of WCYB. A final construction permit grant was made on April 11, 1956, and construction began at once. Even as WOPI and WKPT continued appeals, work began at a new transmitter location, Rye Patch Knob, after the United States Forest Service denied permission for Holston Mountain. The transmitter and tower survive to this day at that location, 2,230 feet (680 m) above average terrain. Meanwhile, an affiliation with NBC was signed, studios were leased in a building at Cumberland and Lee streets.

WCYB-TV began broadcasting on August 13, 1956; it primarily continued testing for several more weeks until a full launch on September 1, though the early start allowed it to present coverage of that year's Democratic National Convention. It has always been a primary NBC affiliate, although it carried a secondary ABC affiliation (shared with WJHL-TV, channel 11) until 1969, when WKPT-TV (channel 19) signed on and took the ABC affiliation. In addition to network programming and news, WCYB produced aired a variety of local shows, including a locally hosted block of Looney Tunes cartoons and the quiz series Klub Kwiz, Klassroom Kwiz, and Kiddie Kollege.

In 1970, Appalachian sold the WCYB stations to Starr Broadcasting; Starr's president and chief stockholder was publisher and columnist William F. Buckley Jr. The sale included the divestiture of WCYB radio. That same year, work began on an urban renewal project in Bristol, Virginia, that included the demolition of the existing WCYB studios and the Hotel General Shelby. A new studio building for WCYB was built on land cleared by the first phase of the project.

Starr sold WCYB-TV in 1977 to Grit Publishing and used the proceeds to pay down debt. After the firm sold its namesake publication, the newspaper Grit, in 1983, it changed its name to Lamco.

In 1999, WCYB launched a cable-only affiliate of The WB, known as CYB.WB, to provide the network in the Tri-Cities when Superstation WGN ceased national carriage. On May 26, 2000, the station began broadcasting in digital, with CYB.WB as a digital subchannel complete with syndicated programming, local news, and local advertising. WCYB-TV became the first station to air multiple networks simultaneously on its digital signal. At the time, WCYB offered Pax as a subchannel as well; both subchannels were available on local cable systems.

Lamco put its stations up for sale in 2002; former Citadel Broadcasting executive Larry Wilson agreed to buy the company in July 2003, but the transaction fell through two months later. Lamco was instead acquired by BlueStone Television LLC, a partnership of the private equity firm Providence Equity Partners and executive Sandy DiPasquale, in 2004.

In 2005, Sinclair Broadcast Group sold the license of WEMT (channel 39), the market's Fox affiliate, for $1.4 million to Aurora Broadcasting Inc. and the non-license assets for $5.6 million to BlueStone Television. As part of the deal, WCYB-TV assumed most of the station's operations and began producing a local 10 p.m. newscast for WEMT. The Aurora purchase closed in February 2006. Three months later, BlueStone put all of its television properties on the market, with the group being acquired by Bonten Media Group LLC in a deal announced in 2006 and approved in 2007. (Note: Parallel to each of the last two ownership transactions, WEMT has been sold. Esteem Broadcasting purchased WEMT from Aurora in tandem with the Bonten purchase of BlueStone, and Cunningham Broadcasting acquired the WEMT license in 2017 alongside the Sinclair deal.)

On April 21, 2017, Sinclair announced its intent to purchase the Bonten stations for $240 million. The sale was completed on September 1. The Fox affiliation from WEMT moved to WCYB-TV's third subchannel on December 8, 2025. Fox was broadcast from both the WEMT and WCYB-TV transmitters until January 12, 2026, when WEMT switched to broadcasting Roar, a Sinclair-owned diginet.

== News operation ==
WCYB was the historic news ratings leader in the Tri-Cities media market and had stronger all-day audience ratings in Virginia, though competitor WJHL-TV in Johnson City, Tennessee, had a larger audience when only the metropolitan area was considered. Through the 1980s, WCYB had a slight overall edge on WJHL, while WKPT's evening newscasts were in a distant third place. WCYB-TV benefited from on-air stability. Merrill Moore anchored WCYB's news from 1962 to 2000, while Johnny Wood did weather and hosted the morning news from 1979 to 2012.

In 1991, WCYB expanded its early evening coverage by adding a 5:30 p.m. newscast, Live at 5:30 p.m., with softer features. It was the first of the major stations in the market to do so, only preceded by WKPT. By 2005, the morning newscast had expanded to 90 minutes, from 5:30 to 7 a.m.; in its first half-hour, 79 percent of households watching TV at that time were tuned to WCYB, among the highest ratings figures in the United States. By 2015, WCYB-TV enjoyed wide leads in the news ratings in the morning and at 6 p.m. and a narrow lead at 11 p.m.

== Technical information and subchannels ==
Logo for CW subchannel

WCYB-TV's transmitter is located at Rye Patch Knob on Holston Mountain in the Cherokee National Forest. The station's signal is multiplexed:

Subchannels of WCYB-TV
Subchannel	Res.	Short name	Programming
5.1	1080i	WCYB-DT	NBC
5.2	1080i	CW-HD	The CW
5.3	720p	FOX	Fox

After beginning digital broadcasting in 2000, WCYB ceased analog broadcasting on June 12, 2009, the official digital television transition date. The station's digital signal relocated from its pre-transition UHF channel 28 to VHF channel 5.

Broadcasting on channel 5, a low-VHF frequency, presented many issues for reception. In 2021, Sinclair filed for and received FCC permission to move the station back to the UHF band on channel 35. The new UHF signal began at half-power on August 22, 2022, and was upgraded to full-power on January 5, 2023.

== See also ==
- Channel 35 digital TV stations in the United States
- Channel 5 virtual TV stations in the United States
