= 2015 Brickyard 400 =

2015 Crown Royal Presents the Jeff Kyle 400 at The Brickyard
Race details
- Race 20 of 36 in the 2015 NASCAR Sprint Cup Series
- The 2015 Brickyard 400 program cover.
- Date: July 26, 2015
- Official name: Crown Royal Presents the Jeff Kyle 400 at The Brickyard
- Location: Indianapolis Motor Speedway in Speedway, Indiana
- Course: Permanent racing facility
- Course length: 2.5 miles (4.023 km)
- Distance: 164 laps, 410 mi (659.831 km)
- Scheduled distance: 160 laps, 400 mi (643.738 km)
- Weather: Mostly cloudy with a temperature of 88 °F (31 °C); wind out of the west/southwest at 5 mph (8.0 km/h)
- Average speed: 131.656 mph (211.880 km/h)

Pole position
Driver	Carl Edwards	Joe Gibbs Racing
- Time: 49.056

Most laps led
Driver	Kevin Harvick	Stewart–Haas Racing
- Laps: 75

Winner
No. 18	Kyle Busch	Joe Gibbs Racing

Television in the United States
- Network: NBCSN
- Announcers: Rick Allen, Jeff Burton and Steve Letarte
- Nielsen ratings: 2.9/7 (Overnight); 3.0/8 (Final); 4.7 Million viewers

Radio in the United States
- Radio: IndyCar Radio Network
- Booth announcers: Doug Rice, Pat Patterson and John Andretti
- Turn announcers: Mark Jaynes (1), Jake Query (2), Rob Albright (3) and Chris Denari (4)

The 2015 Crown Royal Presents the Jeff Kyle 400 at The Brickyard, the 22nd running of the event, was a NASCAR Sprint Cup Series race held on July 26, 2015, at the Indianapolis Motor Speedway in Speedway, Indiana. Contested over 164 laps – extended from 160 laps due to a green–white–checkered finish – on the 2.5-mile (4.0-kilometre) asphalt rectangular oval, it was the 20th race of the 2015 NASCAR Sprint Cup Series season. Kyle Busch won the race, his fourth of the season. Joey Logano finished second, while Kevin Harvick, Martin Truex Jr., and Denny Hamlin rounded out the top five.

Carl Edwards won the pole and led 20 laps on his way to a 13th-place finish. Harvick led a race high of 75 on his way to a third-place finish. The race had 16 lead changes among six different drivers, as well as nine caution flag periods for 36 laps.

This was Busch's 33rd career Sprint Cup victory, fourth of the season, third consecutive and his first at the Indianapolis Motor Speedway. This was also the fourth win at the track for Joe Gibbs Racing. His victory moved him to 32nd in the points standings, 23 points back of Justin Allgaier for the 30th-place Chase cutoff and 483 points back of Harvick. Despite being the winning manufacturer, Toyota left the Brickyard trailing Chevrolet by 80 points in the manufacturer standings.

The race logo for the 2015 Brickyard 400.

The Crown Royal 400 was carried by NBC Sports on the cable/satellite NBCSN network for the American television audience. The radio broadcast for the race was carried by the IndyCar Radio Network and SiriusXM.

== Report ==
=== Background ===
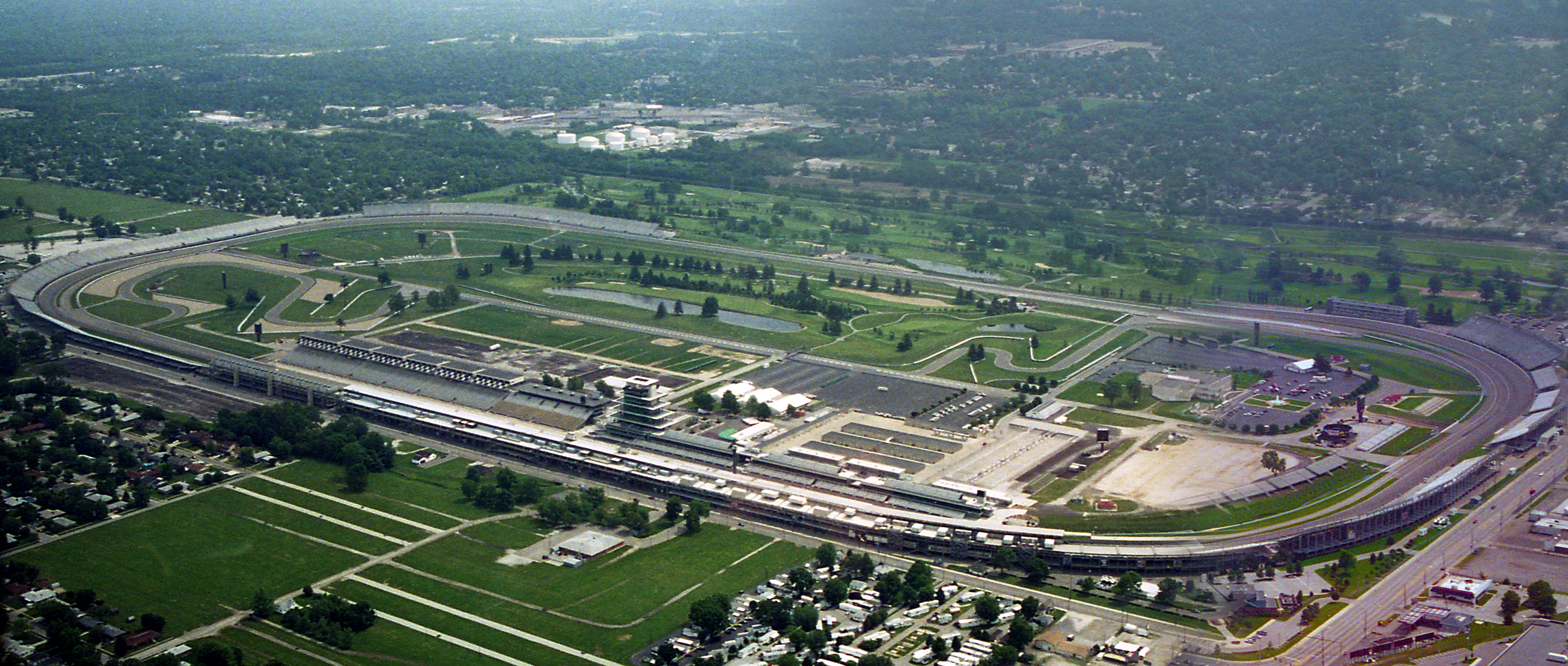
Indianapolis Motor Speedway, the track where the race was held.

The Indianapolis Motor Speedway, located in Speedway, Indiana, (an enclave suburb of Indianapolis) in the United States, is the home of the Indianapolis 500 and the Brickyard 400. It is located on the corner of 16th Street and Georgetown Road, approximately six miles (10 km) west of Downtown Indianapolis.

Kevin Harvick entered the Brickyard with a 69-point lead over Joey Logano. Dale Earnhardt Jr. entered 79 back, Jimmie Johnson entered 88 back, and Martin Truex Jr. entered 106 back.

==== New aero package ====
On July 7, NASCAR announced that a higher drag aero package would be used for the weekend's race. The changes to the cars included a nine-inch spoiler, one-inch wicker bill, 43-inch radiator pan and a two-inch leading edge for the splitter.

==== Changes to qualifying ====
In lieu of knockout qualifying, the weekend's race used the single-car qualifying method that's also used at Daytona and Talladega.

==== Entry list ====
The entry list for the Brickyard 400 was released on Friday, July 17 at 9:28 a.m. Eastern time. Forty-six cars were entered for the race. All but one was entered the previous week's race at New Hampshire. Chase Elliott attempted to make his fourth career start in the No. 25 Hendrick Motorsports Chevrolet. Josh Wise drove the No. 32 Go FAS Racing Ford. Brian Scott returned to the seat of the No. 33 Hillman-Circle Sport LLC Chevrolet. Michael McDowell made his first entry since Kentucky in the No. 95 Leavine Family Racing Ford. Jeff Gordon, tied with Michael Schumacher for all-time winningest driver at Indianapolis, made his 22nd and final career start at the Brickyard.

No.	Driver	Team	Manufacturer	Starts	Best finish
1	Jamie McMurray (W)	Chip Ganassi Racing	Chevrolet	12	1st
2	Brad Keselowski (PC3)	Team Penske	Ford	5	9th
3	Austin Dillon	Richard Childress Racing	Chevrolet	2	10th
4	Kevin Harvick (PC1) (W)	Stewart–Haas Racing	Chevrolet	14	1st
5	Kasey Kahne	Hendrick Motorsports	Chevrolet	11	2nd
6	Trevor Bayne	Roush Fenway Racing	Ford	4	17th
7	Alex Bowman	Tommy Baldwin Racing	Chevrolet	1	40th
9	Sam Hornish Jr.	Richard Petty Motorsports	Ford	4	16th
10	Danica Patrick	Stewart–Haas Racing	Chevrolet	2	30th
11	Denny Hamlin	Joe Gibbs Racing	Toyota	9	3rd
13	Casey Mears	Germain Racing	Chevrolet	11	6th
14	Tony Stewart (PC4) (W)	Stewart–Haas Racing	Chevrolet	16	1st
15	Clint Bowyer	Michael Waltrip Racing	Toyota	9	4th
16	Greg Biffle	Roush Fenway Racing	Ford	12	3rd
17	Ricky Stenhouse Jr.	Roush Fenway Racing	Ford	2	24th
18	Kyle Busch	Joe Gibbs Racing	Toyota	10	2nd
19	Carl Edwards	Joe Gibbs Racing	Toyota	10	2nd
20	Matt Kenseth (PC6)	Joe Gibbs Racing	Toyota	15	2nd
21	Ryan Blaney (i)	Wood Brothers Racing	Ford	0	—
22	Joey Logano	Team Penske	Ford	6	5th
23	J. J. Yeley (i)	BK Racing	Toyota	5	28th
24	Jeff Gordon (PC7) (W)	Hendrick Motorsports	Chevrolet	21	1st
25	Chase Elliott (i)	Hendrick Motorsports	Chevrolet	0	—
26	Jeb Burton (R)	BK Racing	Toyota	0	—
27	Paul Menard (W)	Richard Childress Racing	Chevrolet	8	1st
31	Ryan Newman (W)	Richard Childress Racing	Chevrolet	14	1st
32	Josh Wise	Go FAS Racing	Ford	3	29th
33	Brian Scott (i)	Hillman-Circle Sport LLC	Chevrolet	0	—
34	Brett Moffitt (R)	Front Row Motorsports	Ford	0	—
35	Cole Whitt	Front Row Motorsports	Ford	1	32nd
38	David Gilliland	Front Row Motorsports	Ford	7	17th
40	Landon Cassill (i)	Hillman-Circle Sport LLC	Chevrolet	5	20th
41	Kurt Busch (PC5)	Stewart–Haas Racing	Chevrolet	14	5th
42	Kyle Larson	Chip Ganassi Racing	Chevrolet	1	7th
43	Aric Almirola	Richard Petty Motorsports	Ford	3	17th
46	Michael Annett	HScott Motorsports	Chevrolet	1	31st
47	A. J. Allmendinger	JTG Daugherty Racing	Chevrolet	6	10th
48	Jimmie Johnson (PC2) (W)	Hendrick Motorsports	Chevrolet	13	1st
51	Justin Allgaier	HScott Motorsports	Chevrolet	1	27th
55	David Ragan	Michael Waltrip Racing	Toyota	8	14th
62	Reed Sorenson	Premium Motorsports	Chevrolet	6	5th
78	Martin Truex Jr.	Furniture Row Racing	Chevrolet	10	8th
83	Matt DiBenedetto (R)	BK Racing	Toyota	0	—
88	Dale Earnhardt Jr.	Hendrick Motorsports	Chevrolet	15	4th
95	Michael McDowell	Leavine Family Racing	Ford	5	26th
98	Timmy Hill (i)	Premium Motorsports	Ford	1	42nd
Official entry list

Key	Meaning
(R)	Rookie
(i)	Ineligible for points
(PC#)	Past champions provisional
(W)	Past winner of event

== Practice ==
=== First practice ===
Denny Hamlin was the fastest in the first practice session with a time of 49.394 and a speed of 182.208 mph (293.235 km/h).

Pos	No.	Driver	Team	Manufacturer	Time	Speed
1	11	Denny Hamlin	Joe Gibbs Racing	Toyota	49.394	182.208
2	48	Jimmie Johnson	Hendrick Motorsports	Chevrolet	49.506	181.796
3	4	Kevin Harvick	Stewart–Haas Racing	Chevrolet	49.517	181.756
Official first practice results

=== Second practice ===
Dale Earnhardt Jr. was the fastest in the second practice session with a time of 49.596 and a speed of 181.466 mph (292.041 km/h). Less than three minutes into the session, the hood of Denny Hamlin's car snapped up and smashed his windshield. No significant damage was sustained and he returned to finish twelfth in the session.

Pos	No.	Driver	Team	Manufacturer	Time	Speed
1	88	Dale Earnhardt Jr.	Hendrick Motorsports	Chevrolet	49.596	181.466
2	2	Brad Keselowski	Team Penske	Ford	49.601	181.448
3	5	Kasey Kahne	Hendrick Motorsports	Chevrolet	49.612	181.408
Official second practice results

=== Final practice ===
Kurt Busch was the fastest in the final practice session with a time of 49.454 and a speed of 181.987 mph (292.880 km/h). Early in the session, Timmy Hill crashed into the barrier before the entrance to pit road.

Pos	No.	Driver	Team	Manufacturer	Time	Speed
1	41	Kurt Busch	Stewart–Haas Racing	Chevrolet	49.454	181.987
2	4	Kevin Harvick	Stewart–Haas Racing	Chevrolet	49.515	181.763
3	42	Kyle Larson	Chip Ganassi Racing	Chevrolet	49.626	181.357
Official final practice results

== Qualifying ==
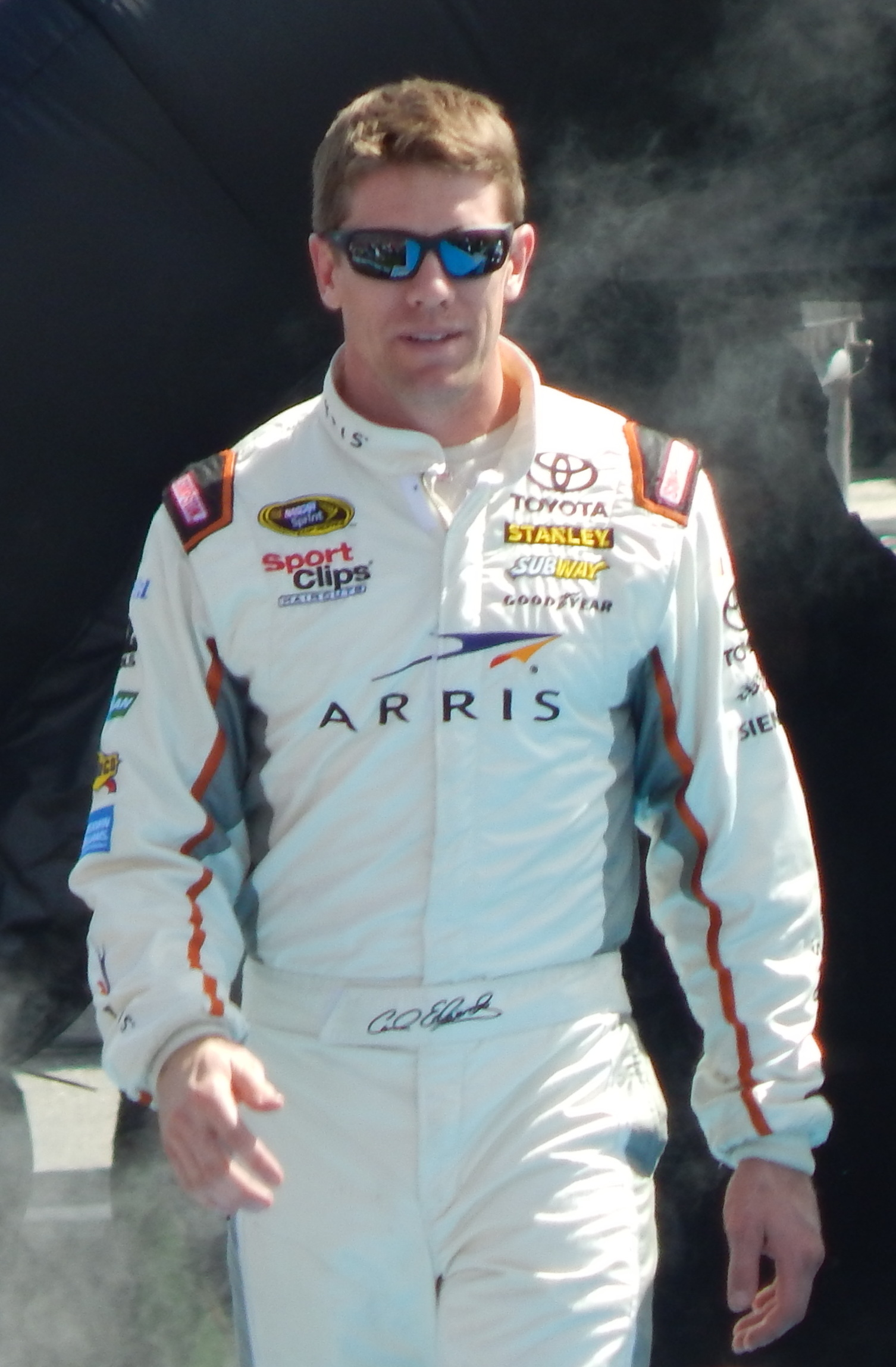
Carl Edwards, seen here at the 2015 Daytona 500, won the pole for the race.

Carl Edwards won the pole with a time of 49.056 and a speed of 183.464 mph (295.257 km/h). “This is really cool," Edwards said. "Just to be here racing is cool and with all the work the guys put in yesterday, we started out terribly and we were really slow. Just proud of everybody for digging deep. Darian (Grubb, crew chief) and these guys have done a great job. TRD, Toyota and everybody has put a lot of effort in and to have Stanley Tools on the pole for the Brickyard 400, this is cool.” "Overall from where we have been this weekend to what we picked up today I am proud of what my Shell Pennzoil team has done," Joey Logano said after qualifying second. "We have a good piece. I look forward to the race tomorrow. Clean air is king. If we can get a good start and settle in and click some laps off and run our strategy we can be there in the end." "Unfortunately that wasn’t the one that paid, but that got us in the second round which was the important part," Tony Stewart said after qualifying fourth. "The second round we were a little bit freer than we were the first round. I was a little busy inside the car. We got that track bar adjuster and I was moving it around quite a bit during the lap.”

=== Qualifying results ===
Pos	No.	Driver	Team	Manufacturer	R1	R2
1	19	Carl Edwards	Joe Gibbs Racing	Toyota	49.038	49.056
2	22	Joey Logano	Team Penske	Ford	48.830	49.143
3	55	David Ragan	Michael Waltrip Racing	Toyota	49.033	49.211
4	14	Tony Stewart	Stewart–Haas Racing	Chevrolet	48.505	49.228
5	42	Kyle Larson	Chip Ganassi Racing	Chevrolet	48.541	49.279
6	4	Kevin Harvick	Stewart–Haas Racing	Chevrolet	48.920	49.329
7	15	Clint Bowyer	Michael Waltrip Racing	Toyota	49.045	49.347
8	88	Dale Earnhardt Jr.	Hendrick Motorsports	Chevrolet	49.077	49.367
9	18	Kyle Busch	Joe Gibbs Racing	Toyota	49.052	49.375
10	1	Jamie McMurray	Chip Ganassi Racing	Chevrolet	48.905	49.386
11	27	Paul Menard	Richard Childress Racing	Chevrolet	49.068	49.443
12	48	Jimmie Johnson	Hendrick Motorsports	Chevrolet	48.825	49.454
13	78	Martin Truex Jr.	Furniture Row Racing	Chevrolet	49.116	—
14	41	Kurt Busch	Stewart–Haas Racing	Chevrolet	49.161	—
15	10	Danica Patrick	Stewart–Haas Racing	Chevrolet	49.180	—
16	13	Casey Mears	Germain Racing	Chevrolet	49.270	—
17	11	Denny Hamlin	Joe Gibbs Racing	Toyota	49.278	—
18	9	Sam Hornish Jr.	Richard Petty Motorsports	Ford	49.320	—
19	24	Jeff Gordon	Hendrick Motorsports	Chevrolet	49.345	—
20	16	Greg Biffle	Roush Fenway Racing	Ford	49.353	—
21	51	Justin Allgaier	HScott Motorsports	Chevrolet	49.386	—
22	43	Aric Almirola	Richard Petty Motorsports	Ford	49.420	—
23	20	Matt Kenseth	Joe Gibbs Racing	Toyota	49.429	—
24	40	Landon Cassill (i)	Hillman-Circle Sport LLC	Chevrolet	49.467	—
25	3	Austin Dillon	Richard Childress Racing	Chevrolet	49.470	—
26	47	A. J. Allmendinger	JTG Daugherty Racing	Chevrolet	49.475	—
27	5	Kasey Kahne	Hendrick Motorsports	Chevrolet	49.618	—
28	25	Chase Elliott (i)	Hendrick Motorsports	Chevrolet	49.714	—
29	17	Ricky Stenhouse Jr.	Roush Fenway Racing	Ford	49.734	—
30	21	Ryan Blaney (i)	Wood Brothers Racing	Ford	49.746	—
31	2	Brad Keselowski	Team Penske	Ford	49.764	—
32	95	Michael McDowell	Leavine Family Racing	Ford	49.785	—
33	6	Trevor Bayne	Roush Fenway Racing	Ford	49.870	—
34	46	Michael Annett	HScott Motorsports	Chevrolet	49.882	—
35	7	Alex Bowman	Tommy Baldwin Racing	Chevrolet	49.910	—
36	33	Brian Scott (i)	Hillman-Circle Sport LLC	Chevrolet	49.994	—
37	38	David Gilliland	Front Row Motorsports	Ford	50.147	—
38	23	J. J. Yeley (i)	BK Racing	Toyota	50.164	—
39	34	Brett Moffitt (R)	Front Row Motorsports	Ford	50.174	—
40	83	Matt DiBenedetto (R)	BK Racing	Toyota	50.304	—
41	35	Cole Whitt	Front Row Motorsports	Ford	50.625	—
42	98	Timmy Hill (i)	Premium Motorsports	Ford	54.211	—
43	31	Ryan Newman	Richard Childress Racing	Chevrolet	0.000	—
Failed to qualify
44	32	Josh Wise	Go FAS Racing	Ford	50.296	—
45	26	Jeb Burton (R)	BK Racing	Toyota	51.087	—
46	62	Reed Sorenson	Premium Motorsports	Chevrolet	51.564	—
Official qualifying results

== Race ==
=== First half ===
==== Start ====
The race was scheduled to start at 3:39 p.m. Eastern time, but started at 3:42 when Carl Edwards led the field to the green flag. He wouldn't lead the first lap, as he lost the lead to Joey Logano exiting turn 2. Edwards pulled up on Logano exiting turn 4 and took the lead for the first time on lap 12. Kevin Harvick was able to pull to within half a second of the leader several of times, but Edwards was able to pull away. Harvick hit pit road for the first time on lap 28, leading to the first round of green flag pit stops. Most of the field had made their stops while Edwards still continued to stay out. He and his teammate Kyle Busch hit pit road on lap 32 and the lead was given to Harvick. Austin Dillon was tagged for speeding on pit road and was forced to serve a drive-through penalty. He was tagged again for speeding while serving and was forced to serve another penalty.

==== Second quarter ====
Debris on the backstretch brought out the first caution of the race on lap 44. The debris was a pair of orange balloons caught on the backstretch catch fence. Logano opted not to pit and regained the lead as Harvick made his pit stop.

The race restarted on lap 50. The second caution flew the same lap when Clint Bowyer, exiting turn 4, got loose and spun down into the grass and Jeff Gordon, trying to avoid him, overcorrected and hit the wall in turn 4, creating a two-car crash. “I was underneath Kasey Kahne and we were just racing for position,” Gordon explained. “I saw (Clint) Bowyer get sideways. I don’t know what caused it. Me and Kasey were trying to check up to avoid it. I don’t know if he got loose or we just both got loose together. Then I just lost control and got in the wall.”

The race restarted on lap 55. Logano gave up the lead on lap 62 to pit and handed it back to Harvick. Danica Patrick gave up fifth to pit on lap 84. Harvick pitted from the lead on lap 84 and handed it to Brad Keselowski, who gave up the lead to pit the next time by and handed it to Kyle Busch. Debris on the front stretch brought out the third caution of the race on lap 90. Harvick opted not to pit and retook the lead.

=== Second half ===
==== Halfway ====
The race restarted on lap 97. The fourth caution of the race flew on lap 107 when Aric Almirola got loose, slid down the backstretch, and hit with the inside wall. A number of cars behind Harvick opted to pit under caution.

The race restarted on lap 112. The fifth caution of the race flew with 40 laps to go when Brian Scott got loose and slammed the wall exiting turn 2. Everyone but Brad Keselowski, David Ragan, Tony Stewart, and Kasey Kahne opted to pit. Harvick was one of those drivers who opted to pit, and this gave the lead to Keselowski.

==== Fourth quarter ====
The race restarted with 36 laps to go. David Ragan shot ahead of Keselowski going into turn 1 to take the lead with 35 laps to go. He pitted with 34 laps to go and handed the lead back to Keselowski. Debris on the backstretch brought out the sixth caution of the race with 20 laps to go. That debris was a piece of Justin Allgaier's tire. Keselowski opted to pit under caution, giving the lead back to Harvick.

The race restarted with 14 laps to go. The seventh caution of the race flew with 13 laps to go when Dale Earnhardt Jr. got pushed into the grass in turn 1, came back up, and spun out.

The race restarted with eight laps to go. Kyle Busch got the jump on Harvick to pass him in turn 1 and take the lead with seven laps to go. Debris in turn 2 brought out the eighth caution of the race with six laps to go. That debris came from Casey Mears's car.

The race restarted with two laps to go. The ninth caution of the race flew when Trevor Bayne got rear-ended and went into the wall while going into turn 1 at the restart.

===== Green–white–checkered finish =====
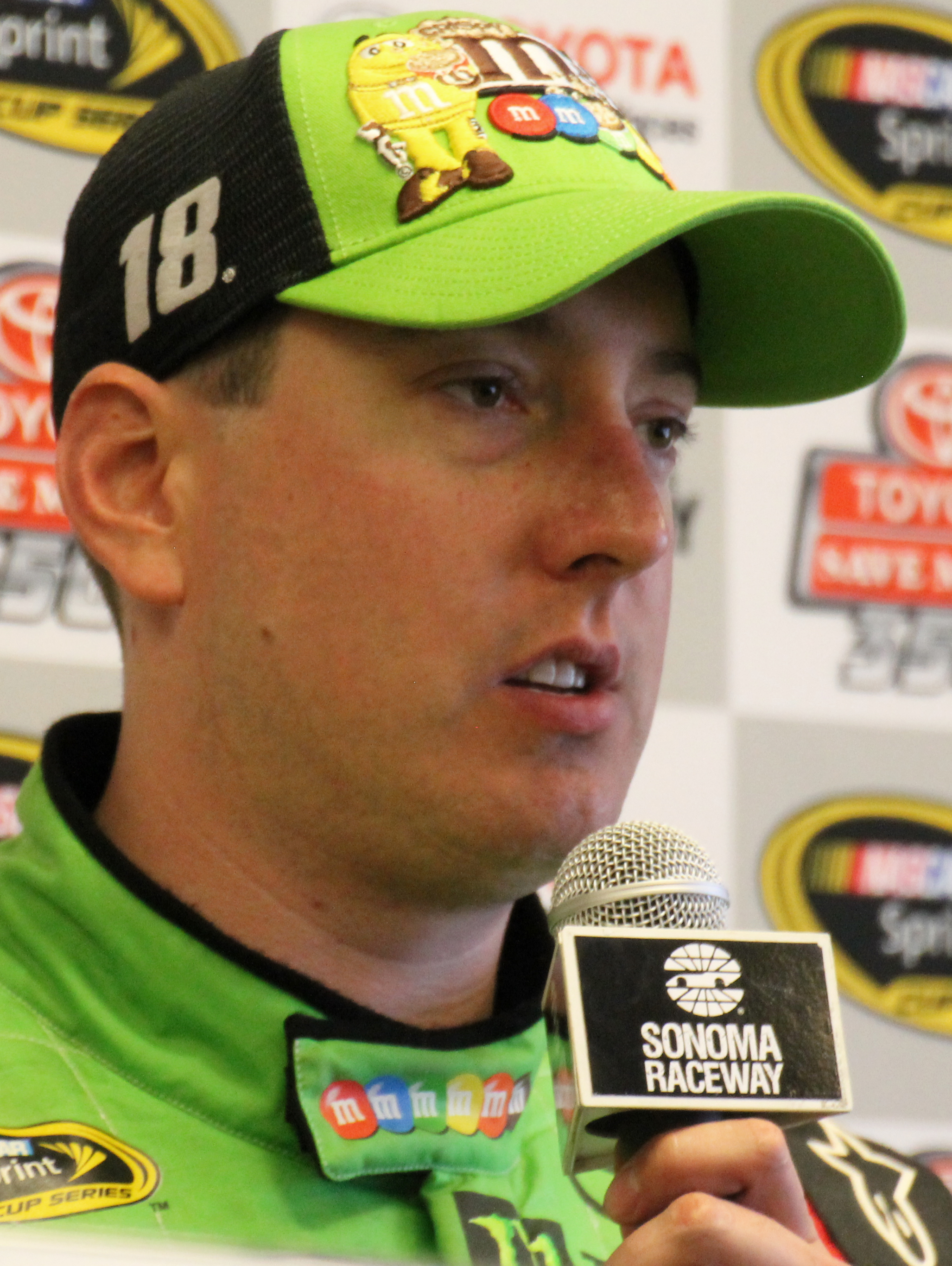
Kyle Busch, seen here at Sonoma Raceway, won his third straight race of the season.

The race restarted with two laps to go at a green–white–checkered finish. Busch shot ahead of Logano and drove off to score his 33rd career victory and his first at the track.

== Post-race ==
=== Driver comments ===
“The new high drag aerodynamic package used at Indianapolis was hoped to create more drafting and passing. While there was some of that sporadically on track, Sunday’s race had the same flavor as most Brickyard 400s at Indianapolis. Strategy was the key ingredient that provided spice and interest with fuel mileage as usual a big part of the day. As many drivers predicted restarts, especially with the new package, were wild but again at Indianapolis that’s nothing new. Perhaps a bigger impact will come next month when the high drag rules are used at Michigan International Speedway.’’

— Motor Racing Network lead writer and co-host of The Morning Drive on Sirius XM NASCAR Radio Pete Pistone giving his thoughts on the new aero package.

“It’s really a treat to win here at Indy,” Busch said. “I appreciate all the fans that I have, all the fans that NASCAR has and Toyota has now captured a win at every single active Cup Series race track – that’s pretty awesome for us to be able to do that. I can’t thank this crew enough. Everyone at Joe Gibbs Racing, all the men and women there, you work so hard and pour your hearts into it. I can’t thank everyone that has stood behind me all year.”

“Yeah, I thought overall the day went well,” Logano said. “You know, you come to Indy, it's all about the win, either win or finish last. It doesn't really matter anywhere in between. At least that's the way I race when we come to a racetrack like this, Daytona and Indy. It's all about getting trophies and rings and making out with bricks. Unfortunately we come up a little bit short.”

“You always want to put yourself in position for a win at the end and that’s what we did today,” Truex said after finishing fourth. “We fought hard and stayed patient all day. We got caught on pit road again when the caution came out, but fortunately we had enough time to get back to the front. We had good cars the past four races but had horrible luck. Today it came together and it’s a good feeling to regain momentum.”

After being passed for the lead on the final lap of the previous day's Xfinity Series race, Ryan Blaney rebounded to finish twelfth. "It was a good run for us," he said of the Indy run. "I wish things played out a little better for us in the end, but it wasn't too bad when we finally got track position. That was so huge today. I thought when we got a little bit of clean air, we were pretty good. But it was hard to get that. We were in a good spot for that last restart but it really didn't go our way. I was wanting to get some help and the 2 car [Brad Keselowski, who finished tenth] really didn't help us out. But I'm really proud of these guys. After starting 30th, we worked our way up there and I can't thank them enough."

=== Media comments ===
"“We’re digesting the signs from it. The fans and the industry saw the race unfold as we did. There were certainly some components, the balance of competition, the opportunities that this package presented for the drivers to perform were of benefit, but we’ve heard the expressions of some of the drivers that didn’t like some of characteristics of the project. We can absorb all of the science and the data we collect, including talking to the industry, the drivers, the crew members and the competition departments of the teams and the car owners to take all of that now and absorb it. That’s part of the reason we created this specific package for Indianapolis – to see the characteristics of it, knowing that there are a lot of personalities in the garage area that have different opinions ... but it’s on NASCAR to come up with the one that we put in front of the fans on each individual racetrack each weekend. So, we’ll take time.’’

— NASCAR Vice Chairman Mike Helton discussing the sanctioning body's thoughts on the aero package.

Members of the NASCAR media gave their thoughts on the aero package used for this race. Pete Pistone, lead writer for the Motor Racing Network and co-host of The Morning Drive on Sirius XM NASCAR Radio, described the race as having "the same flavor as most Brickyard 400s at Indianapolis."

Jim Utter of Motorsport.com also said it "didn’t look all that different than Brickyards of the past and not at all like the predictions (or hopes) of lots of “pack racing” and drafting."

Dave Moody expressed that the race "wasn't any worse, but it wasn't much better, either."

Jenna Fryer of the Associated Press was more critical of NASCAR's decision to use a higher downforce package saying that "the route NASCAR followed has failed, and the series is stubbornly staying the course despite the results."

Speaking on behalf of the sanctioning body on The Morning Drive on Sirius XM NASCAR Radio Monday morning, NASCAR Vice Chairman Mike Helton explained to Mike Bagley and Pete Pistone that NASCAR has been making these changes "to build the most competitive type of motorsports we can build. We want our product on the racetrack to be pleasing to the fans and that means close competition." But he also said that they're "digesting the signs from it" and that they'll "take time" dissecting the results of the package.

== Race results ==
Pos	No.	Driver	Team	Manufacturer	Laps	Points
1	18	Kyle Busch	Joe Gibbs Racing	Toyota	164	47
2	22	Joey Logano	Team Penske	Ford	164	43
3	4	Kevin Harvick	Stewart–Haas Racing	Chevrolet	164	43
4	78	Martin Truex Jr.	Furniture Row Racing	Chevrolet	164	40
5	11	Denny Hamlin	Joe Gibbs Racing	Toyota	164	39
6	15	Clint Bowyer	Michael Waltrip Racing	Toyota	164	38
7	20	Matt Kenseth	Joe Gibbs Racing	Toyota	164	37
8	41	Kurt Busch	Stewart–Haas Racing	Chevrolet	164	36
9	42	Kyle Larson	Chip Ganassi Racing	Chevrolet	164	35
10	2	Brad Keselowski	Team Penske	Ford	164	35
11	31	Ryan Newman	Richard Childress Racing	Chevrolet	164	33
12	21	Ryan Blaney (i)	Wood Brothers Racing	Ford	164	0
13	19	Carl Edwards	Joe Gibbs Racing	Toyota	164	32
14	27	Paul Menard	Richard Childress Racing	Chevrolet	164	30
15	48	Jimmie Johnson	Hendrick Motorsports	Chevrolet	164	29
16	1	Jamie McMurray	Chip Ganassi Racing	Chevrolet	164	28
17	9	Sam Hornish Jr.	Richard Petty Motorsports	Ford	164	27
18	25	Chase Elliott (i)	Hendrick Motorsports	Chevrolet	164	0
19	16	Greg Biffle	Roush Fenway Racing	Ford	164	25
20	13	Casey Mears	Germain Racing	Chevrolet	164	24
21	55	David Ragan	Michael Waltrip Racing	Toyota	164	24
22	88	Dale Earnhardt Jr.	Hendrick Motorsports	Chevrolet	164	22
23	47	A. J. Allmendinger	JTG Daugherty Racing	Chevrolet	164	21
24	5	Kasey Kahne	Hendrick Motorsports	Chevrolet	164	20
25	3	Austin Dillon	Richard Childress Racing	Chevrolet	164	19
26	40	Landon Cassill (i)	Hillman-Circle Sport LLC	Chevrolet	164	0
27	10	Danica Patrick	Stewart–Haas Racing	Chevrolet	164	17
28	14	Tony Stewart	Stewart–Haas Racing	Chevrolet	164	16
29	38	David Gilliland	Front Row Motorsports	Ford	163	15
30	46	Michael Annett	HScott Motorsports	Chevrolet	162	14
31	95	Michael McDowell	Leavine Family Racing	Ford	162	13
32	83	Matt DiBenedetto (R)	BK Racing	Toyota	162	12
33	35	Cole Whitt	Front Row Motorsports	Ford	162	11
34	34	Brett Moffitt (R)	Front Row Motorsports	Ford	162	10
35	17	Ricky Stenhouse Jr.	Roush Fenway Racing	Ford	161	9
36	33	Brian Scott (i)	Hillman-Circle Sport LLC	Chevrolet	161	0
37	51	Justin Allgaier	HScott Motorsports	Chevrolet	161	7
38	43	Aric Almirola	Richard Petty Motorsports	Ford	161	6
39	23	J. J. Yeley (i)	BK Racing	Toyota	160	0
40	6	Trevor Bayne	Roush Fenway Racing	Ford	155	4
41	98	Timmy Hill (i)	Premium Motorsports	Ford	111	0
42	24	Jeff Gordon	Hendrick Motorsports	Chevrolet	110	2
43	7	Alex Bowman	Tommy Baldwin Racing	Chevrolet	78	1
Official Crown Royal Presents the Jeff Kyle 400 at The Brickyard results

=== Race statistics ===
- 16 lead changes among 6 different drivers
- 9 cautions for 36 laps
- Time of race: 3 hours, 6 minutes, 51 seconds
- Average speed: 131.656 mph (211.880 km/h)
- Kyle Busch took home $424,191 in winnings

Lap Leaders
Laps	Leader
1-11	Joey Logano
12-31	Carl Edwards
32-45	Kevin Harvick
46-61	Joey Logano
62-83	Kevin Harvick
84	Brad Keselowski
85-92	Kyle Busch
93-120	Kevin Harvick
121-123	David Ragan
124	Brad Keselowski
125-126	David Ragan
127-141	Brad Keselowski
142-152	Kevin Harvick
153-161	Kyle Busch
162	Joey Logano
163-164	Kyle Busch

Total laps led
Leader	Laps
Kevin Harvick	75
Joey Logano	28
Carl Edwards	20
Kyle Busch	19
Brad Keselowski	17
David Ragan	5

==== Race awards ====
- Coors Light Pole Award: Carl Edwards (49.056, 183.464 mph (295.257 km/h))
- 3M Lap Leader: Kevin Harvick (75 laps)
- American Ethanol Green Flag Restart Award: Joey Logano
- Duralast Brakes "Bake In The Race" Award: Kevin Harvick
- Freescale "Wide Open": Kevin Harvick
- Ingersoll Rand Power Move: Sam Hornish Jr. (9 positions)
- MAHLE Clevite Engine Builder of the Race: Hendrick Engines #4
- Mobil 1 Driver of the Race: Kevin Harvick (135.5 driver rating)
- Moog Steering and Suspension Problem Solver of The Race: Brad Keselowski (crew chief Paul Wolfe (0.120 seconds))
- NASCAR Sprint Cup Leader Bonus: No winner: rolls over to $170,000 at next event
- Sherwin-Williams Fastest Lap: Carl Edwards (Lap 2, 50.317, 178.866 mph (287.857 km/h))
- Sunoco Rookie of The Race: Matt DiBenedetto

== Media ==
=== Television ===
NBC Sports covered the race. Rick Allen, Jeff Burton, and Steve Letarte had the call in the booth for the race. Dave Burns, Mike Massaro, Marty Snider, and Kelli Stavast handled pit road for the television side.

NBCSN
Booth announcers	Pit reporters
Lap-by-lap: Rick Allen; Color-commentator: Jeff Burton; Color-commentator: Steve Letarte	Dave Burns; Mike Massaro; Marty Snider; Kelli Stavast

=== Radio ===
IndyCar Radio Network had the radio call for the race, which was simulcast on the Performance Racing Network and Sirius XM NASCAR Radio. Doug Rice, Pat Patterson, and former NASCAR drive John Andretti called the race from the Pagoda as the field was racing down the front stretch. Mark Jaynes called the race from atop the stands outside turn 1 when the field was racing through turn 1. Jake Query called the race from atop the turn 2 stands when the field was racing through turn 2. Rob Albright called the race from atop the turn 3 stands when the field was racing through turn 3. Chris Denari called the race from atop the turn 4 stands when the field was racing through turn 4. Brad Gillie, Brett McMillan and Nick Yeoman worked pit road for the radio side.

IndyCar Radio Network
Booth announcers	Turn announcers	Pit reporters
Lead announcer: Doug Rice; Announcer: Pat Patterson; Announcer: John Andretti	Turn 1: Mark Jaynes; Turn 2: Jake Query; Turn 3: Rob Albright; Turn 4: Chris Denari	Brad Gillie; Brett McMillan; Nick Yeoman

== Standings after the race ==
Drivers' Championship standings

	Pos	Driver	Points
	1	Kevin Harvick	777
	2	Joey Logano	708 (–69)
	3	Dale Earnhardt Jr.	677 (–100)
	4	Jimmie Johnson	675 (–102)
	5	Martin Truex Jr.	668 (–109)
	6	Brad Keselowski	638 (–139)
	7	Matt Kenseth	615 (–162)
	8	Kurt Busch	612 (–165)
	9	Jamie McMurray	602 (–175)
1	10	Denny Hamlin	591 (–186)
1	11	Jeff Gordon	575 (–202)
1	12	Ryan Newman	563 (–214)
1	13	Paul Menard	558 (–219)
2	14	Kasey Kahne	558 (–219)
1	15	Clint Bowyer	538 (–239)
1	16	Carl Edwards	519 (–258)

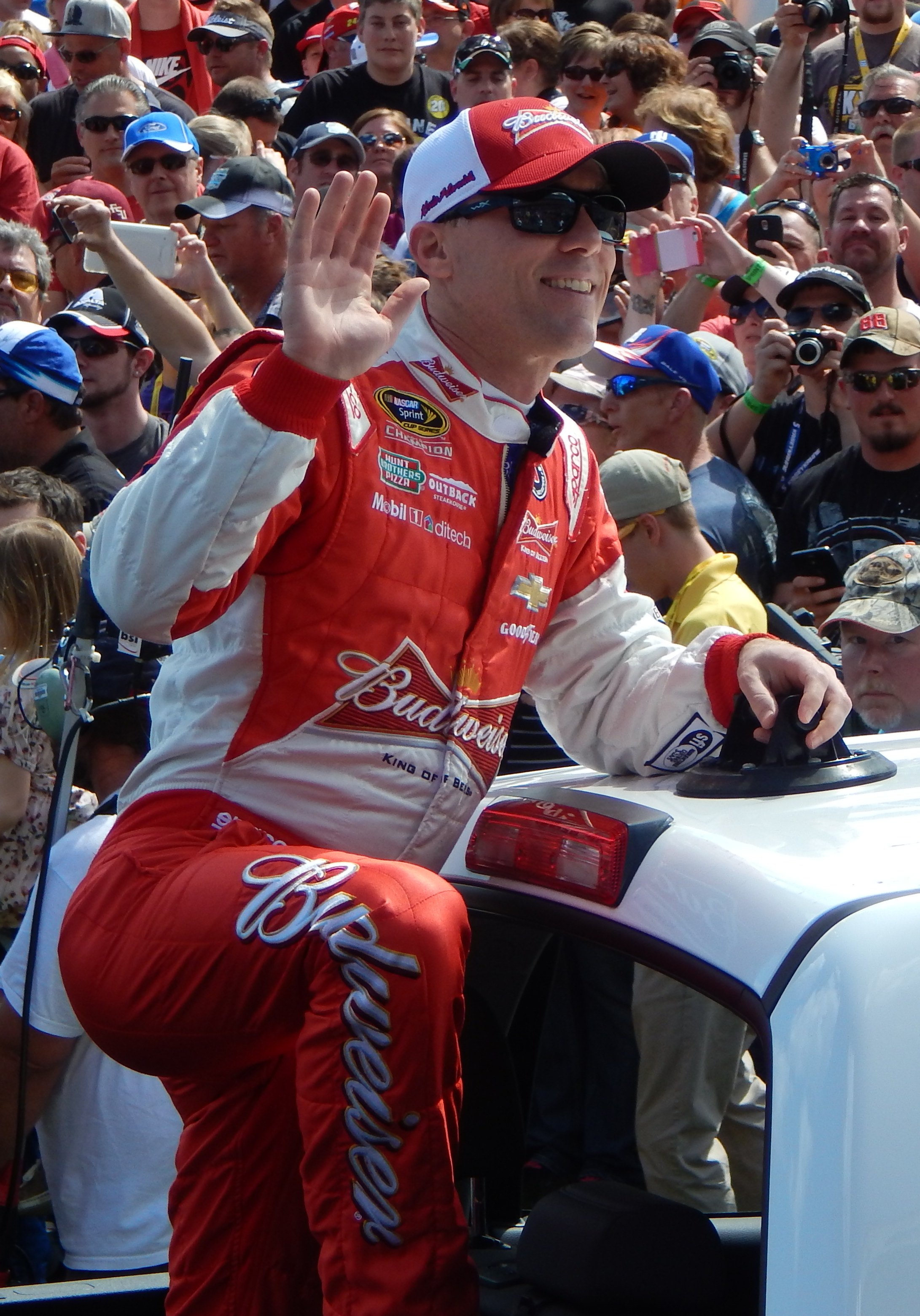
Kevin Harvick left Indianapolis with a 69–point lead over Joey Logano.

Manufacturers' Championship standings

Pos	Manufacturer	Points
1	Chevrolet	896
2	Ford	821 (–75)
3	Toyota	816 (–80)

- Note: Only the first sixteen positions are included for the driver standings.

Previous race: 2015 5-hour Energy 301	Sprint Cup Series; 2015 season	Next race: 2015 Windows 10 400
