= Mike Helton =

American businessman (born 1953)

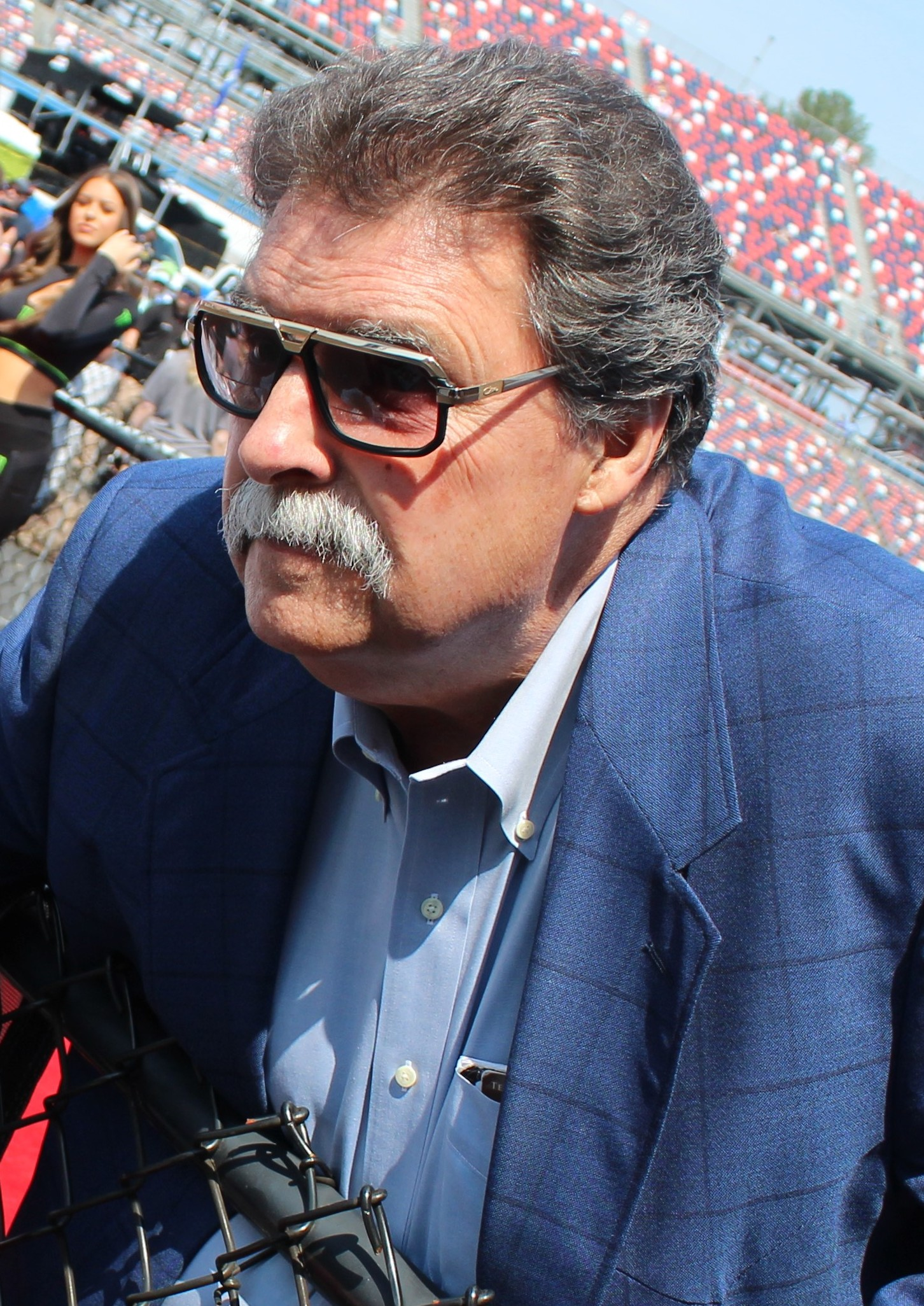
- Helton in 2019
- Born: Michael Gregory Helton; August 30, 1953 (age 73); Bristol, Virginia, U.S.
- Education: King University
- Occupation: Vice chairman of NASCAR
- Years active: 1980–present
- Employer: NASCAR
- Spouses: Juanita Allania Dickenson (m. 1973, divorced) Linda Diane Barnes (m. 1983)
- Children: 2

Michael Gregory Helton (born August 30, 1953) is an American businessman and the current vice chairman for NASCAR. He is best known for being NASCAR's third president and for officially announcing to the public the death of Dale Earnhardt. He previously held management positions at various racetracks across the United States before becoming the president of NASCAR. In 2015, he became the vice chairman of NASCAR, overseeing competition in NASCAR's national series.

Helton was born and raised within the Bristol, Virginia area. After getting his first job as a high school football referee, he became the station director of WOPI. With the help of then-Bristol International Raceway public relations director Eddie Gossage in 1980, he was assigned to become the public relations director at the Atlanta International Raceway (now Atlanta Motor Speedway) in October, landing him his first major job in auto racing, later becoming the general manager five years later. After a period of holding management positions at various tracks owned by the International Speedway Corporation (ISC), he was hired by NASCAR to become NASCAR's chief operating officer in 1994. He was later promoted to become NASCAR's president in 1999, a position he held until 2015, when he was reassigned to become the current vice chairman of NASCAR.

Helton is regarded as a key figure within NASCAR, directing many of NASCAR's major changes throughout the 1990s, 2000s and the early 2010s. Throughout his tenure within the sport, he has been the manager of numerous several major racetracks including the Atlanta Motor Speedway and the Talladega Superspeedway, overseen television deals, has directed numerous projects to improve the safety of NASCAR, and has overseen a growth of popularity and subsequent decline in NASCAR. Numerous NASCAR drivers and businessmen, including Dale Earnhardt Jr., Tony Stewart, Clint Bowyer, and current NASCAR chief operating officer Steve O'Donnell have praised Helton for a hard-working nature and according to Bowyer, the ability to "[take] the time to relate to you and understand your needs."

== Early life ==
Helton was born on August 30, 1953, in Bristol, Virginia to Orville Bundy Helton and (1923–1985) and Sarah Kathryn Hayter (1927–2007). He was born to three brothers: Dan, Ron, and Alan. He lived a "few hundred yards" from a fertilizer plant, where his father worked as the general manager.

Helton first experienced auto racing when he attended his first race at the Bristol International Raceway (now Bristol Motor Speedway) in 1965 for the 1965 Volunteer 500. The winner, Ned Jarrett, had driven a 1965 Ford Galaxie. the same car that his dad drove. Helton later stated that, "I became hooked on racing that day." Helton later entered a brief period of racing at both Wythe Raceway and Kingsport Raceway; however, he "figured out pretty quick that if [he] was going to do something in racing it wasn't going to be driving."

According to Helton, for most of his childhood, he considered three jobs: a minister, a state trooper, or a pilot. He attended John S. Battle High School, graduating in 1971. While at John S. Battle, he played basketball, wearing the No. 54. He graduated with numerous honors, including being a member of the National Honor Society and being named the senior class president. After high school, he had originally planned to commit to the United States Air Force Academy for college, but gave up to get state trooper recruitment forms. He later also gave that job up, giving the recruitment forms to his brother, Dan. He attended King University after graduation, majoring in business administration and minoring in mathematics. He graduated in 1975, and later became an accountant for a year and a half. However, Helton came to regret it; according to The Anniston Star writer Donnie Webb, he found it "monotonous" and "in only a matter of time, he had gotten his fill of counting bottles of Thunderbird and Old Forester until he was drunk with boredom."

== Business career ==
=== Early sports official and radio career ===
Sometime in the late 1970s, Helton became a high school sports official for basketball and football. According to Helton, he claims that his work as a high school sports official was crucial to developing a reputation for being fair, proclaiming that, "there are rules and regulations to police and if you take the job seriously, which I did, you automatically become fair with people". While working as an official, one of his coworkers ran local radio station WOPI. Helton later accepted a job there, working as an advertising salesman and as a sports director, along with hosting a weekly Saturday sports broadcast. Once, Helton recalled a NASCAR Winston Cup Series race held at the Texas World Speedway in 1979 where WOPI had become the only form of medium to cover the race as no national radio or television network had offered to broadcast the race. To Helton, "I was a NASCAR fan back then... I look back and am amazed by that."

=== Racetrack ventures ===
By 1980, Helton had lost his job at WOPI. Helton, who was a frequent visitor of the Bristol International Raceway, later met then-public relations director of Bristol, Eddie Gossage. According to Gossage, when Helton asked for assistance, he asked to get a job in public relations. Gossage, with the help of Ed Clark, a friend of Helton, helped land Helton the public relations director position at the Atlanta International Raceway in October for track manager Bobby Batson, replacing the outgoing Tom Roberts. While working as the speedway's public relations director, he was one of five full-time employees at the speedway, and was tasked with a variety of jobs, including plumbing, landscaping and maintaining grass, and raising cattle in the infield. In 1984, he was involved in the investigation of the death of driver Terry Schoonover at the 1984 Atlanta Journal 500; he denied fault for any party involved along with Bill Gazaway, NASCAR's vice president of competition, calling the death "a freak accident".

In January 1985, Helton was promoted to become the general manager of the Atlanta International Raceway. While as general manager, he negotiated race sponsorship deals with The Atlanta Journal newspaper, directed the construction of new walls in response to Schoonover's death, won a bid to host The Winston (now known as the NASCAR All-Star Race), and directed renovations in preparation for the 1986 The Winston.

==== International Speedway Corporation ====
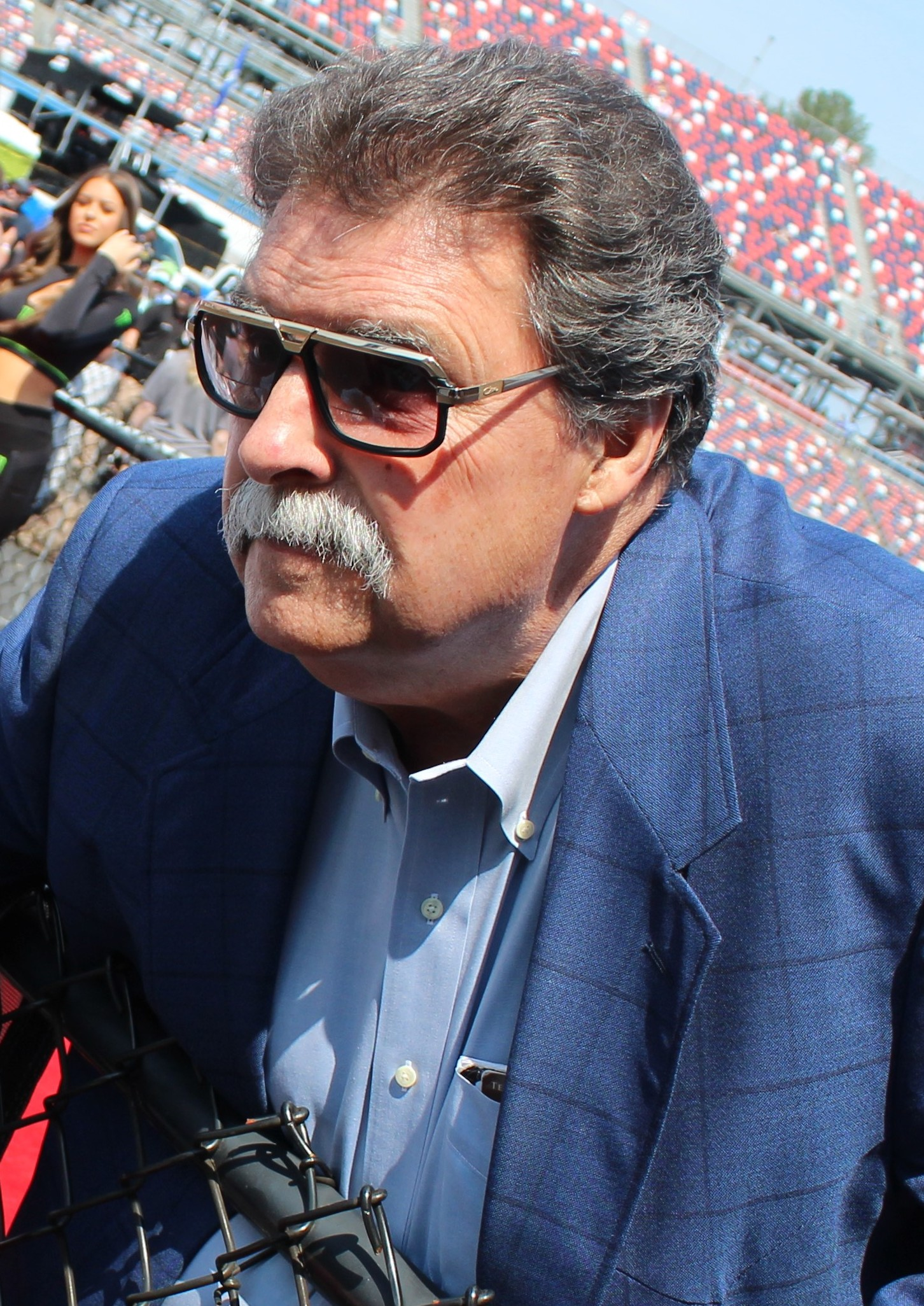
Helton at the Talladega Superspeedway in 2019. Helton was the general manager of Talladega Superspeedway for five years, from 1989–1994.

In May 1986, Helton left the Atlanta International Raceway to take a position at the Daytona International Speedway as their Director of Promotions and Market Development, which involved managing promotions and advertising for the speedway. In October 1987, Alabama International Motor Speedway (now Talladega Superspeedway) general manager Don Naman resigned to serve on the International Motorsports Hall of Fame board of directors. The company that owned both Daytona and Alabama, the International Speedway Corporation (ISC), chose Helton to replace him on the basis that the company needed someone with some sort of general managing experience to replace Naman; Helton was the only one available who fit the criteria. On January 30, 1989, Helton announced that he was promoted to become the president of the track; on the same day, Helton announced that the track was to change its name to Talladega Superspeedway, as according to Talladega's publicity director, Jim Freeman, "it's shorter, and everybody called it 'Talladega' anyway". In 1991, he was the chairman of the Talladega County Economic Development Authority in a period that saw a period of slow development for Talladega County due to effects of a nationwide recession.

Throughout his time working at Talladega, Helton expressed satisfaction at its NASCAR races. In his first race as Talladega's general manager, the 1988 Winston 500, Helton proclaimed after the race that, "this is the 21st Winston Cup race to be involved with, and this was the easiest and simplest event I ever worked". In 1992, Helton directed the implementation of a new infield campground at Talladega; the decision was met with relative praise from Helton and the local The Anniston Star newspaper.

=== Working within NASCAR management ===
In November 1993, NASCAR announced that Helton had been appointed as the vice president of competition effective January 1, 1994, replacing long-time holder of the position, Les Richter. Helton immediately entered into a turbulent situation; that year, a tire war between the Goodyear Tire and Rubber Company and Hoosier Racing Tire had been renewed, and NASCAR was looking into new markets. Later that year, driver Ernie Irvan suffered a life-threatening crash at the Michigan International Speedway, a track known for high speeds. Helton, when asked if NASCAR should slow cars down, stated that NASCAR had no plans to, but were considering reverting back to a one-tire manufacturer system. Also in the same year, Helton stated that he had gotten offers from both Roger Penske and Richard Childress for race dates in the Los Angeles area and College Station, Texas, respectively; Helton stated that he was only seriously looking into expanding into the Los Angeles market. In December, a new, proposed track that was planned to be built in North Texas by businessman Bruton Smith was also considered; Helton stated that adding new tracks was "a pretty major issue" and that NASCAR had not made organized efforts to expand into Texas nor another proposal at Homestead–Miami Speedway.

In the next couple years, Helton oversaw major expansion and growth within NASCAR. Although initially stating that "the Cup schedule can't grow much more" in January 1995, numerous modern, higher-capacity racetracks were planned to be built in Las Vegas, the Dallas–Fort Worth metroplex, and St. Louis. Along with the booming, rising popularity of NASCAR in the 1990s, many in the NASCAR media landscape predicted that NASCAR would have to both find new markets and leave racetracks that had been staples of the Winston Cup schedule since NASCAR's inception. By midway through 1996, Knoxville News Sentinel writer Bill Luther wrote that numerous short tracks, such as North Wilkesboro Speedway and the Martinsville Speedway were "in peril" of losing Winston Cup dates. When NASCAR later announced the 1997 NASCAR Winston Cup Series schedule in early September, numerous changes were made in an attempt to capture a more causal and wider market base; among the most notable were that the newly built Texas Motor Speedway and California Speedway were added along with another date at New Hampshire International Speedway, at the cost of long-time staple North Wilkesboro Speedway. Later, the Las Vegas Motor Speedway and the Homestead–Miami Speedway gained dates for the 1998 and 1999 seasons, respectively.

In February 1999, NASCAR president Bill France Jr. announced that he would be giving up day-to-day operations control of NASCAR to Helton, essentially giving Helton control of NASCAR. With the move, Helton was slated to become one of the favorites to be the next president of NASCAR pending France Jr.'s resignation of the position, competing with France Jr.'s son, Brian France. The decision was met with relative positivity from drivers and teams. During his time as chief operating officer, Helton continued to seek revises to the NASCAR schedule, seeking new markets for the NASCAR Winston Cup Series despite a push from Smith to get a second date at Texas Motor Speedway and expanding into other markets for NASCAR's lower national touring series.

Helton, along with NASCAR, received controversy after both Adam Petty and Kenny Irwin Jr. died at the New Hampshire International Speedway due to basilar skull fractures as a result of a stuck throttle; as a result, Helton directed numerous changes to cars to slow them down at New Hampshire, including the implementation of restrictor plates. However, in a September 2000 press conference, Helton also stated that he would not mandate head restraint devices nor kill switches. The lack of action caused some criticism towards NASCAR leadership; Mike Mulhurn, a writer for the Winston-Salem Journal, stated that he felt Helton had "no solid answers... furthering the image of NASCAR's indecisiveness".

==== Tenure as NASCAR president ====
On November 28, 2000, Bill France Jr. stepped down from his position as president of NASCAR due to complications with cancer, with Helton taking his place, becoming the first person to govern NASCAR that was not a member of the France family. The first year of Helton's stewardship oversaw a tumultuous period in NASCAR's history. On February 18, 2001, after that year's Daytona 500, Helton announced to the public the death of NASCAR superstar Dale Earnhardt, who died in a last-lap crash, with the announcement being regarded as one of the most tragic moments in NASCAR's history. The death was the turning point of an intense debate over NASCAR's safety, which had been brewing since May 2000 with the deaths of drivers Petty, Irwin Jr., Tony Roper, and Earnhardt happening within the span of nine months. Writing for Tampa Bay Times, Kevin Kelly stated in March that Helton's "dream job [has become] a nightmare". As a result of the deaths and increasing public scrutiny, Helton directed a years-long push to increase the safety of NASCAR. A few months later, NASCAR and Helton found itself severely affected by the aftermath of the September 11 attacks on sports events, postponing the 2001 New Hampshire 300 by over two months. The entirety of the 2001 NASCAR Winston Cup Series season was described by Rick Minter in The Atlanta Journal-Constitution as leaving a "legacy of fundamental change".

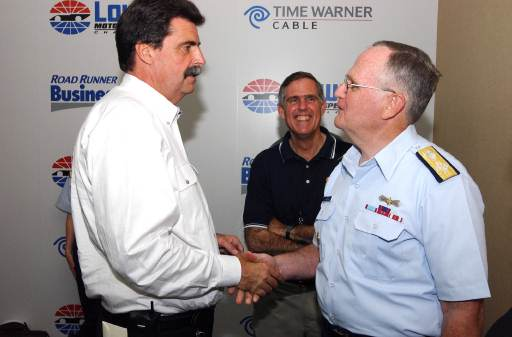
Helton (left) meeting with Admiral Thomas Collins in 2005 at the Lowe's Motor Speedway.

After 2001, Helton implemented numerous changes and oversaw the continued growth of NASCAR. In 2003, Helton and NASCAR oversaw a $750 million (adjusted for inflation, $1.312635673×10^{9}), 10-year deal with Nextel to replace the R. J. Reynolds Tobacco Company and their Winston subsidiary to be the title sponsor of the NASCAR Cup Series. That same year, Helton banned the longtime practice of racing back to the line when a caution came out due to safety concerns. In January 2004, Helton, along with NASCAR CEO Brian France, announced the implementation of the Chase for the Nextel Cup points system, aiming to put an emphasis on winning races. The new format was in response to Matt Kenseth's 2003 championship. Despite only winning one race that season, he secured the championship with consistent top-5 and top-10 finishes, ending the season 90 points ahead of runner-up Jimmie Johnson. Helton also tried to steer NASCAR into a "cleaner image", issuing fines and point penalties for cursing during interviews. By 2006, Helton felt that NASCAR's "old Southeastern redneck heritage that we had is no longer in existence", drawing accusations that NASCAR had turned its back on its core audience in the Southeastern United States. Later that year, Helton allowed Japanese automobile maker Toyota to enter into the NASCAR Nextel Cup Series, a decision that was met with criticism at the time.

NASCAR found itself with a decrease of attendance and ratings throughout the 2006 and 2007 seasons. As a result, Helton expressed a desire to regain their "traditional fanbase" in 2008. After the Great Recession, NASCAR found itself further affected by the economy's stagnation, worsening its decline. In response, Helton outlawed testing as a cost-cutting measure in 2009, along with other measures. After mounting criticism with the Car of Tomorrow (CoT), Helton announced in an interview with Texas Motor Speedway president Eddie Gossage that NASCAR would replace the car's rear wing with a spoiler in March 2010.

==== Vice chairman reassignment, other endeavors ====
In February 2015, then-NASCAR CEO Brian France announced that Helton had been reassigned to the title of being the vice chairman of NASCAR, leaving him with the responsibilities of being the "senior NASCAR official at all national series racing events overseeing competition" along with working with France to help advance NASCAR's growth. With the move, the position of president was left vacant until 2017, when then-NASCAR COO Brent Dewar took over the position. Helton later stated that he "wasn’t hurt, but neither was I fine with it. It was somewhere in the middle there." In December 2018, Helton was named to the American Motorcyclist Association (AMA) board of directors.

== Personal life ==
Helton has three brothers: Dan, who worked as a Virginia State Police officer, Ron, who worked as the president of Virginia-based construction engineering firm Thompson & Litton, and Alan, who worked as an engineer for Bechtel in Bristol. Mike, along with his current wife, Lynda, have two children together: Rich and Tina. While living in Bristol, Virginia, he was the president of the local Optimist International club.

Helton had a close relationship with NASCAR driver Dale Earnhardt. Helton had first met Earnhardt while working as a sports reporter for WOPI for an interview at the 1979 Southeastern 500. The two later met that year, and developed a friendship soon after. When Earnhardt died, Helton stated that he had "some sleepless nights" and that "it upset him that his friend's death [had] become a spectacle".

=== Marriages ===
Helton married his first wife, Juanita Allania Dickenson, in Bluefield, Virginia, on May 27, 1973. Sometime in the 1980s, Helton married Lynda Diane Barnes, his current wife. Before Helton's time in NASCAR, Lynda worked at a local hotel near where Mike was working, with the relationship described by Lynda as "hectic. We don't see that much of each other, but we are so used to it... we both have been doing this for so many years." In 1990, the couple's house was destroyed in a tornado while the two lived in Talladega, Alabama. The two currently reside in Ormond Beach, Florida.

== Legacy and honors ==
Helton is regarded as one of the most influential and looked-at figures working in NASCAR. In a 2004 article from the Florence Morning News, writer Lou Brziak described Helton as having been "used to being the bad guy", stating that Helton was "living under a microscope". In response to criticism, Associated Press writer Dick Brinster wrote that, "Helton gets upset by the negative comments but accepts them as a sign of passion from the sport's fans". Jack Roush, part-owner of RFK Racing, states that Helton and the rest of NASCAR's board of directors are a "benevolent dictatorship".

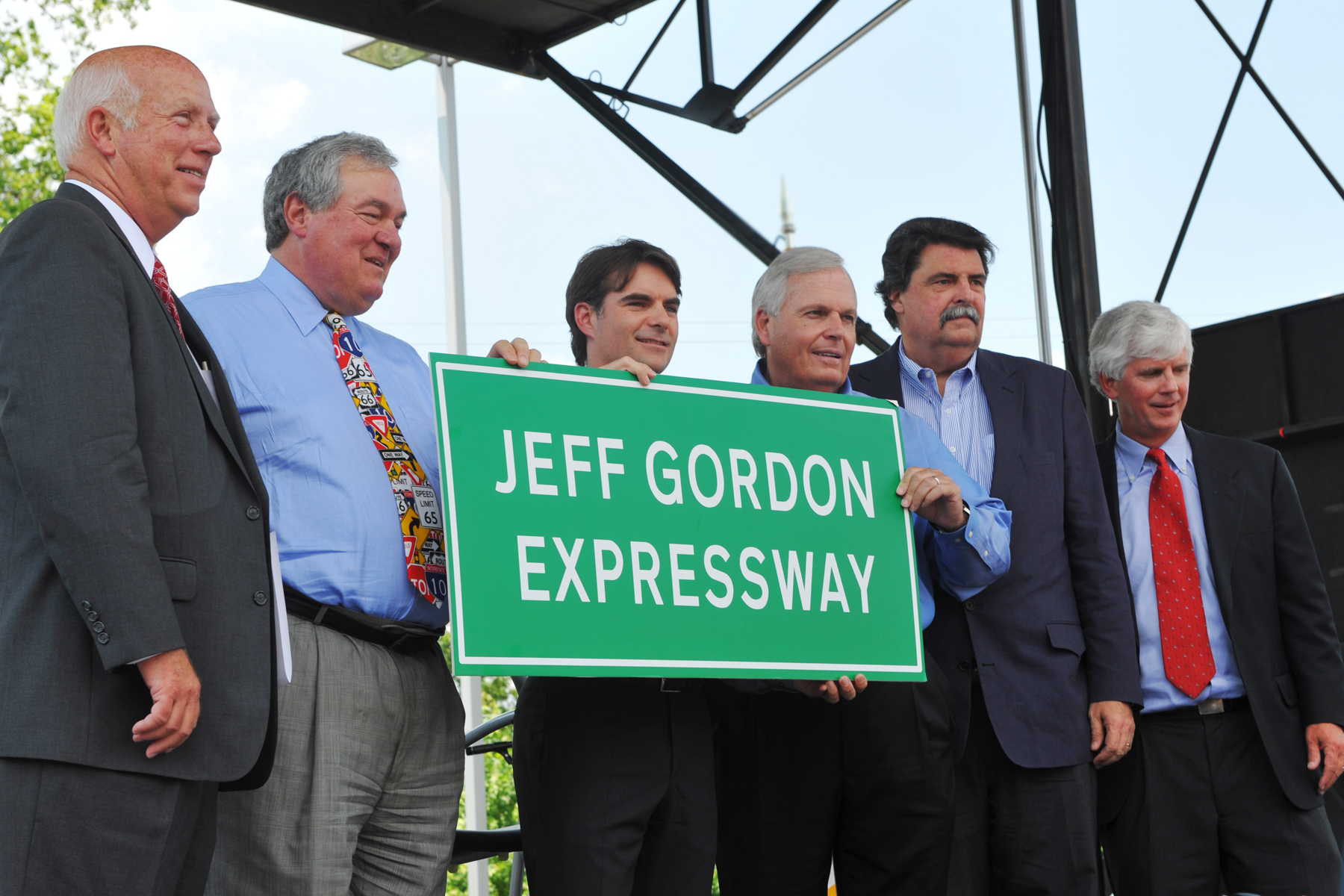
Helton (second from right) dedicates a section of Interstate 85 in NASCAR driver Jeff Gordon's name.

Helton has been praised on his attitude towards how other figures in the industry treat NASCAR, being regarded as a figure who "[just] wants you to... respect the sport" according to Spire Motorsports co-owner Jeff Dickerson. He has been described by Bristol Herald Courier writer Allan Gregory as "intimidating", stating that, "with his large build, booming voice and prominent mustache Helton commands respect". Numerous drivers, such as Dale Earnhardt Jr. and Tony Stewart, have also praised his ethic. Stewart, in an article published by The Charlotte Observer, stated that Helton was "probably the guy I respect more than anyone". In the same article, NASCAR team owner Rick Hendrick stated that, "he's got the respect of everybody. I would hate to think we had to replace him". In another article published by The Athletic's Jeff Gluck, driver Clint Bowyer commended Helton's ability to "[take] the time to relate to you and understand your needs".

Helton has also been praised for a push for increased safety after the deaths of four drivers in a nine month timeframe, culminating in the death of NASCAR superstar Dale Earnhardt. Despite initial and widespread criticism against Helton and NASCAR after the end of the 2000 season, especially by Orlando Sentinel writer Ed Hinton for not implementing enough measures, after the 2001 season, he was praised afterwards for implementing safety measures and improvements that have been effective, to the point where NASCAR has not had a death in its top three series since Earnhardt's accident. Longtime track promoter Humpy Wheeler praised Helton despite mounting criticism against Helton during the season, stating in The Tennessean in 2002, "It's a wonder that [he] isn't about 5-foot-5 after all he had dumped on him last year... I think he did an excellent job."

=== Recognition ===
- Helton was awarded an honorary degree from his alma mater, King University, in 2001.
- Helton was awarded the Myer Brothers Award from the National Motorsports Press Association for contributions to motorsports in 2002.
- Helton was awarded the Achievement in Motorsports Tribute Award from the North Carolina Motorsports Association in 2015.
- Mike, along with his wife Lynda, were given an award for their "philanthropic and service efforts" by the county of Volusia County, Florida in 2020.
- Helton was awarded the Cameron R. Argetsinger Award by the International Motor Racing Research Center for "outstanding contributions to motorsports" in 2022.
- Helton was awarded the Landmark Award from the NASCAR Hall of Fame in 2023.
- Helton has been the honorary starter of numerous NASCAR Cup Series races, including the 2023 Food City Dirt Race and the 2023 4EVER 400.
