= WITM =

WITM may refer to:

- WITM (FM), a radio station (88.7 FM) licensed to serve West Frankfort, Illinois, United States
- WHNK (AM), a radio station (1330 AM) licensed to serve Marion, Virginia, United States, which held the call sign WITM from 2007 to 2017
- WIHM (AM), a radio station (1410 AM) licensed to serve Taylorville, Illinois, which held the call sign WITM in 1995
- WHHQ, a defunct radio station (1520 AM) formerly licensed to serve Elizabethton, Tennessee, United States, which held the call sign WITM from 1988 to 1995
