= WAPK =

WAPK may refer to:

- WAPK-CD, a television station in Tennessee and Virginia, USA
- the ICAO code for Benjina-Nangasuri Airport
