= WAPW =

WAPW may refer to:

- WAPW-CD, a television station (channel 23, virtual channel 19) licensed to Abingdon, etc., Virginia, United States
- WWWQ, a radio station (99.7 FM) licensed to Atlanta, Georgia, United States, which used the call sign WAPW from February 1988 to November 1992

== Other uses ==
- WAPW (Polish: Wydział Architektury Politechniki Warszawskiej) Faculty of Architecture, Warsaw University of Technology
