= WVEK-FM =

- Weber City, Virginia; United States
- Broadcast area: Tri-Cities
- Frequency: 102.7 MHz
- Branding: Classic Hits 102-7

Programming
- Format: Classic hits

Ownership
- Owner: Glenwood Communications Corporation; (Holston Valley Broadcasting Corporation)
- Sister stations: WAPK-CD, WOPI, WKPT, WKPT-TV, WKTP, WRZK, WTFM

History
- First air date: 1991
- Former call signs: WSEH (1991–2005)
- Call sign meaning: Western Virginia, Eastern Kentucky (former location)

Technical information
- Licensing authority: FCC
- Facility ID: 14721
- Class: C3
- ERP: 1,750 watts
- HAAT: 376 meters
- Transmitter coordinates: 36°31′36.0″N 83°35′13.0″W

Links
- Public license information: Public file; LMS
- Webcast: Listen Live
- Website: classichits1027.com

WVEK-FM (102.7 MHz) is a classic hits formatted broadcast radio station licensed to Weber City, Virginia, serving the Tri-Cities area. WVEK-FM is owned and operated by Glenwood Communications Corporation, through subsidiary Holston Valley Broadcasting Corporation.

== History ==
WVEK went on the air as WSEH on July 26, 1991 and was owned by Cumberland City Broadcasting.

On May 26, 2005, WSEH switched its calls to WVEK-FM and its format to classic rock. Five days later on May 31, 2005, the station was sold to Regina Kay Moore, who owned nearby WJNV.

On June 27, 2008, Moore began the process to sell WVEK-FM to Holston Valley Broadcasting Corporation of Kingsport, Tennessee. The sale of the station would be "consummated" on July 16, 2008.

On July 28, 2008, WVEK-FM fell silent ahead of its move to Weber City, Virginia. WVEK-FM returned to the air on August 21, 2008 with classic hits.
