= TriCities.com =

Online newspaper in Tennessee, United States

- Company type: Joint venture
- Website type: News website
- Available in: English
- Founded: 2003
- Dissolved: 2012
- Area served: Tri-Cities (Tennessee–Virginia)
- Owners: Bristol Herald Courier and WJHL-TV
- Website: tricities.com (now redirects to heraldcourier.com)

TriCities.com was an online source for news and information in the Tri-Cities (Johnson City, TN; Kingsport, TN; Bristol, TN-VA) area of northeast Tennessee and southwest Virginia. The website debuted in June 2003, and unified two previous news websites for the region, wjhl.com and BristolNews.com.

In 2010, the Bristol Herald Courier working with TriCities.com won the Pulitzer Prize for Public Service, the highest honor in American journalism, for "illuminating the murky mismanagement of natural-gas royalties owed to thousands of land owners in southwest Virginia, spurring remedial action by state lawmakers."

== Location ==
TriCities.com operations were based out of the WJHL-TV News Channel 11 building located at 338 East Main Street in Johnson City, TN. TriCities.com also had an office based out of the Bristol Herald Courier building located at 320 Bob Morrison Blvd in Bristol, VA.

== Staff ==
TriCities.com was maintained by a staff of full-time employees as well as a host of other contributors from the Bristol Herald Courier and News Channel 11 (WJHL-TV).

== Awards ==
- 2008 Southern Newspaper Publishers Association - Best Web Site, Honorable Mention
- 2007 NAA ACME Awards - Online sports news coverage
- 2005 Regional Addy Award
- 2004 Best Website Design, Tennessee Press Association
