= Bristol Herald Courier =

Newspaper in Bristol, Virginia, US

- Where Your Story Lives

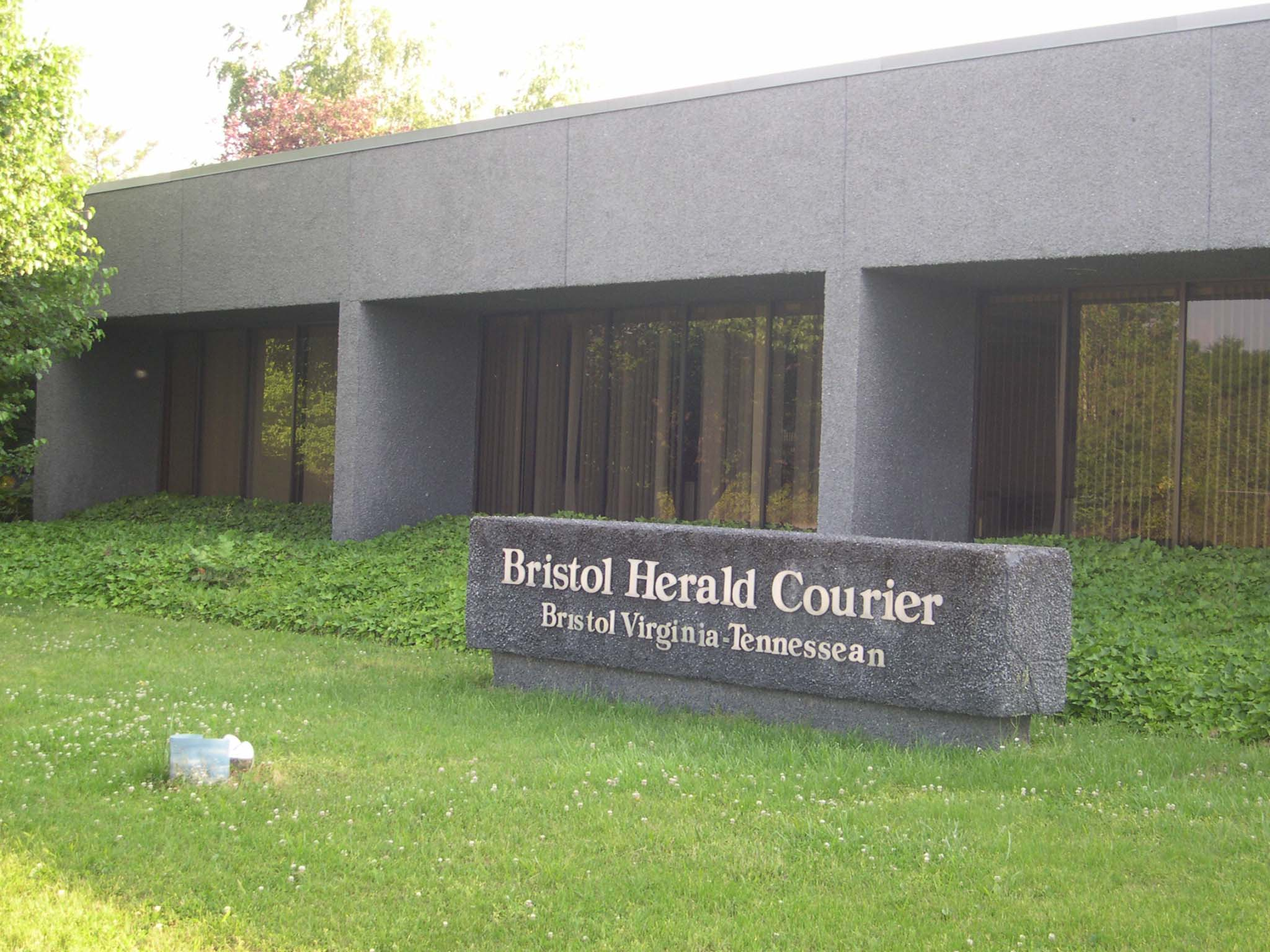
- Office of the Bristol Herald Courier in Bristol, Va. Daily newspaper
- Type: Daily newspaper
- Format: Broadsheet
- Owner: Lee Enterprises
- Founder: John Slack
- Founded: August 1865; 161 years ago
- Political alignment: Independent
- Headquarters: 320 Bob Morrison Blvd; Bristol, VA 24201; United States
- Circulation: 7,385 Daily (as of 2023)
- ISSN: 1552-2458
- OCLC number: 43525780
- Website: heraldcourier.com

The Bristol Herald Courier is a daily newspaper owned by Lee Enterprises. The newspaper is located in Bristol, Virginia, a city located in Southwest Virginia on the Tennessee border.

The Herald Courier is in what the media industry calls a converged newsroom, meaning its online (heraldcourier.com) print (Herald Courier) and broadcast (WJHL-Johnson City) operations work together closely. Herald Courier reporters are trained to occasionally deliver webcasts of Bristol news, conduct TV "talk-backs" with WJHL and gather audio for daily stories. News Channel 11 reporters often have bylined stories that appear in the Herald Courier news pages. Under Media General, both operations provided content for TriCities.com, a Media General's Digital Media Department subsidiary. The future of the website is said to be up in the air.

In 2010, the Herald Courier won the Pulitzer Prize for Public Service, the highest honor in American journalism, for "illuminating the murky mismanagement of natural-gas royalties owed to thousands of land owners in southwest Virginia, spurring remedial action by state lawmakers."

== History ==
The beginning of the present Bristol Herald Courier came in August 1865. That was when John Slack founded the Bristol News. This publication continued until after the turn of the century. In 1870, Slack launched the Bristol Courier, a weekly which became Bristol's first daily paper in 1888. George L. Carter, founder of the Clinchfield Railroad, moved to Bristol in 1903 and founded the Bristol Herald. When Carter left Bristol in 1907 the Herald was combined with the Courier and became the Bristol Herald Courier.

The 1934 Carter Family song "It'll Aggravate Your Soul" mentions the newspaper.

On October 16, 1949, T. Eugene Worrell and a number of the city's leading businessmen launched the Bristol Virginia-Tennessean, first published in direct competition with the Herald Courier and the evening News Bulletin. After many months of intense rivalry, the Herald Courier and Virginia-Tennessean joined in a printing agreement allowing both to carry on competitively in news and editorial fields while enjoying economies afforded by joint operations.

In 1986, after 36 years of home deliveries, the Bristol Virginia-Tennessean succumbed to the trend of dying afternoon newspapers and was combined with the morning editions of the Bristol Herald Courier. The combined morning publication with three editions covered and circulated in nine Southwest Virginia counties, Upper East Tennessee and the City of Bristol.

January 1, 1998, marked the sale of the Bristol Herald Courier to Media General. It was sold to Berkshire Hathaway in 2012, and later purchased by Lee Enterprises.

Starting June 27, 2023, the print edition of the newspaper will be reduced to three days a week: Tuesday, Thursday and Saturday. Also, the newspaper will transition from being delivered by a traditional newspaper delivery carrier to mail delivery by the U.S. Postal Service.

== Newsroom staff ==
In 2008 and 2009, the paper won five national journalism awards, including four from the Associated Press Sports Editors and one from the Southern Newspaper Publishers Association. The paper was a 2007 national finalist for online convergence by the Associated Press Managing Editors. In 2018, it was chosen as one of three finalists for the 2017 annual award in the Scripps Howard Foundation's Community Journalism category, for its feature, “Addicted at Birth.” It won the Scripps Howard Community Journalism award. The judges' comments included: "The newspaper, with a circulation of 16,500, investigated the problem from all angles, outlined solutions and educated the community. The impact is wide-ranging for taxpayers, hospitals, families and schools." "It not only reported what's happening but foreshadowed what the community could face in the future."
