= WKPT-TV =

Television station in Kingsport, Tennessee

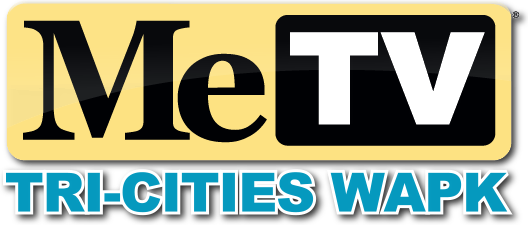
- Kingsport–Johnson City–; Bristol, Tennessee; Bristol, Virginia; United States
- City: Kingsport, Tennessee
- Channels: Digital: 32 (UHF); Virtual: 19
- Branding: Cozi TV Tri-Cities; MeTV Tri-Cities WAPK (19.2); WOPI TV (19.3)

Programming
- Affiliations: 19.1: Cozi TV; for others, see § Subchannels

Ownership
- Owner: Glenwood Communications Corporation; (Holston Valley Broadcasting Corporation)
- Sister stations: WAPK-CD, WKPT (AM), WKTP, WMEV-FM, WOPI (AM), WRZK, WTFM, WVEK-FM

History
- First air date: August 20, 1969
- Former channel numbers: Analog: 19 (UHF, 1969–2009); Digital: 27 (UHF, 2000–2019)
- Former affiliations: ABC (1969–2016); MyNetworkTV (2016–2017)
- Call sign meaning: Kingsport, Tennessee

Technical information
- Licensing authority: FCC
- Facility ID: 27504
- ERP: 265 kW
- HAAT: 711 m (2,333 ft)
- Transmitter coordinates: 36°25′53″N 82°8′15″W
- Translator(s): WOPI-CD 9; WKPT-CD 22; WAPW-CD 21

Links
- Public license information: Public file; LMS
- Website: wkpttv.com

WKPT-TV (channel 19) is a television station licensed to Kingsport, Tennessee, United States, serving the Tri-Cities area as an affiliate of Cozi TV. It is owned by Glenwood Communications Corporation alongside low-power Class A MeTV affiliate WAPK-CD (channel 36) and several radio stations, including WKPT (1400 AM). All of the outlets share studios on Commerce Street in downtown Kingsport; WKPT-TV's transmitter is located on Holston Mountain in the Cherokee National Forest.

== History ==
=== As an ABC affiliate ===
WKPT's final logo under ABC affiliation from 2013 until January 2016.

WKPT-TV began broadcasting on August 20, 1969, as the Tri-Cities' exclusive ABC affiliate. Previously, the network had been shared between NBC affiliate WCYB-TV (channel 5) and CBS affiliate WJHL-TV (channel 11), each of which picked its own ABC programs to air. However, many viewers in the area could view the entire ABC schedule on nearby WLOS in Asheville, North Carolina. Before WKPT signed on, WLOS included the Tri-Cities as part of its primary coverage area as it was widely available over the air (from a transmitter on Mount Pisgah that provided city-grade picture quality) and on cable.

WKPT has three historical distinctions. First, it is the oldest UHF television station in Tennessee to have maintained continuous operation on the UHF band to the present. Second, it is the second-oldest station in Tennessee to have had the same licensee from its inaugural date to the present. WBBJ-TV in Jackson is the oldest but only after it was sold to Bahakel Communications. Third, for years it was the only locally owned and operated full-power station in the Tri-Cities. However, that fact was merely by default. Because the antenna heights of its two VHF rivals, WJHL and WCYB, extend beyond the 2,000-foot (610 m) above-average terrain full power ceiling height mandated by the Federal Communications Commission (FCC), those two could not operate at their full power capacities. WCYB radiated 65,000 watts ERP analog visual while WJHL radiated 245,000 watts ERP analog visual.

WKPT was one of the first stations to invoke the FCC's network non-duplication rule, first adopted in 1965, that required local cable companies to black out any distant stations they carried if they were showing the same programming as a local station. As a result, the easily receivable signal from WLOS, 110 miles (180 km) away, was always blacked out on cable systems in the Tri-Cities any time both stations were broadcasting ABC programming. Local WLOS programming, however, was not blacked out.

WCYB and WJHL received ABC via traditional ground microwave relay stations provided by AT&T back in the 1950s and 1960s. However, when WKPT started in 1969, its owners could not afford to spend a half million dollars per year for a network feed. As a result, the station developed its own low-cost way of bringing ABC to upper East Tennessee and Southwestern Virginia. Before the advent of satellite technology, WKPT utilized a series of private microwave relay stations between Kingsport and Knoxville.

As the ABC signal was being transmitted via traditional microwave from AT&T into the studios of then-ABC affiliate WTVK-TV on Sharp's Ridge in Knoxville (now CBS affiliate WVLT-TV), WKPT would literally "grab" the telco signal just as it reached WTVK's studios. It then sent the signal via private microwave to a relay station 70 miles (110 km) line-of-sight east to Camp Creek Bald on the Tennessee–North Carolina border in southern Greene County, Tennessee. The ABC signal was then re-transmitted via another WKPT microwave 33 miles (53 km) line-of-sight further east to the WKPT transmitter site on Holston Mountain. From the relay point there, it was transmitted by a third WKPT microwave 25 miles (40 km) line-of-sight down to the studios in downtown Kingsport through the station's master control board and then back to Holston Mountain via the station's regular studio-transmitter link and then broadcast on channel 19.

Private microwave relays of network programming were prevalent for many medium- and small-market stations before the advent of AT&T commercial microwave. WHIS-TV (now WVVA) in Bluefield, West Virginia, operated its own private microwave relay that brought NBC to Bluefield from WSLS-TV in Roanoke, Virginia. In its early days, WSMV-TV in Nashville, Tennessee, received its NBC feed from WAVE-TV in Louisville, Kentucky; and WSAZ-TV in Huntington, West Virginia, operated a private microwave to deliver NBC first from WLWT in Cincinnati, Ohio, then from WLWC (now WCMH-TV) in Columbus, Ohio.

Whenever any part of WKPT-TV's private microwave relay system malfunctioned, as it did periodically because of heavy snowfall or downed trees, station engineers were forced to broadcast the signal of either WTVK or WLOS whenever network programming was airing. Occasionally, WKPT accidentally aired the local commercials and the station identifications of either WTVK or WLOS, being unable to cover them up quickly. When WTVK swapped affiliations with WATE-TV, WKPT merely moved its Knoxville microwave relay 800 ft (240 m) west to WATE's transmitter site, also on Sharp's Ridge, and continued to receive ABC via its privately owned microwave relay system. Ironically, the AT&T network signals for WJHL and WCYB were both delivered from Greenville, South Carolina, to the phone company microwave that is also atop Camp Creek Bald that fed the Knoxville television stations.

Under federal must-carry rules, broadcasters can either allow cable systems in their market to carry their signals for free or charge a fee under retransmission consent provisions. On December 3, 2008, it was announced that Inter Mountain Cable (IMC), a cable provider serving parts of Eastern Kentucky, announced that it would drop WKPT from their lineup unless an agreement was reached over retransmission consent. According to The Mountain Eagle, this dispute has caused concern among officials in the city of Fleming-Neon, where IMC holds the cable television franchise there. The city council in Fleming-Neon have stated that the removal of WKPT would violate IMC's franchise agreement.

=== MyNetworkTV affiliate ===
WKPT-TV's logo as a MyNetworkTV affiliate, from February 1, 2016, to January 29, 2017

On January 4, 2016, WKPT announced that it had lost its ABC affiliation effective February 2016; ABC programming moved to the new ABC Tri-Cities subchannel of Media General's WJHL-TV. Holston Valley Broadcasting president George DeVault stated that ABC had chosen to explore other options even after having agreed in principle to a five-year extension of WKPT's affiliation contract. According to DeVault, channel 19 had been a "loyal affiliate" of ABC for 46 years and was willing to pay $15 million to remain with the network. However, ABC showed a preference for being affiliated with a corporate-owned station, rather than an independent family-owned broadcaster such as Holston Valley. He added that family-owned stations have significantly less bargaining power in retransmission disputes with cable and satellite providers than stations owned by larger companies, a major reason why networks prefer to affiliate with group-owned stations.

With the loss of ABC programming, WKPT switched to MyNetworkTV on February 1, 2016, assuming the affiliation as well as syndicated programming previously seen on sister station WAPK-CD (which switched to MeTV) while retaining WKPT's syndicated programs. WKPT continued to carry the Litton's Weekend Adventure Saturday morning E/I block which is most known for being carried by ABC affiliates, as that is under a syndication agreement with Litton Entertainment and was separate from WKPT's expired contract with ABC.

=== Switch to Cozi TV ===
WKPT-TV dropped the MyNetworkTV affiliation and its syndicated programming at midnight on January 29, 2017; the station then moved Cozi TV programming from channel 19.3 to the main channel and transferred Laff from WAPK-CD's third subchannel to 19.3. The move came as a result of Holston Valley Broadcasting opting to refocus WKPT and WAPK entirely around "nostalgia-based programming", stating that MeTV outrates ABC Tri-Cities outside of prime time; it also allows Cozi TV programming to be seen on Dish Network and DirecTV. The voiding of all of WKPT's syndication contracts cleared the way for Litton to move Weekend Adventure to WJHL-DT2 two months later.

== News operation ==
WKPT's first personalities in the early 1970s included news anchors Martin Karant and Bill Freehoff along with weather/sports with Bill Trailer. These distinguished broadcasters had been popular personalities on WKPT radio (1400 AM) and made the move to television. Karant continued to hold his position on WKPT radio until his retirement in 1997. Until February 2002, WKPT produced news in-house. However, the station never made much headway against WCYB and WJHL, choosing instead to focus on news in the immediate Kingsport area, largely ignoring Virginia entirely.

From February 2002 through September 2006, nightly 6 and 11 o'clock newscasts originated from WJHL and were simulcast on both WKPT and WJHL in a news share agreement. In situations where one station was off (due to network run over or other circumstances), the news was broadcast on the other station at the correct time.

Starting in September 2006, WJHL's nightly 11 o'clock broadcast was repeated on WKPT at or around 1:06 in the morning. In addition, a five-minute news and weather summary was provided at 11:30 p.m. to accommodate for the gap between the end of syndicated programming and the beginning of Nightline. At some point, this programming was dropped. Also, WJHL's weekday Noon show had been repeated on WAPK and WKPT-DT3 / WOPI-CA on a half-hour delay at 12:30. Like all RTV affiliates in the Eastern Time Zone, that station also aired Daytime weekday mornings at 9.

In 2009, WKPT began airing local news and weather briefs that were taped in advance using the resources of its sister radio stations. It eventually relaunched a small news department in 2010 with the debut of two weeknight news and weather updates that included a five-minute cut-in at 6:25 and an eight-minute brief at 11, featuring news anchor Cyrus Fees. In March 2012, these cut-ins began resembling abbreviated newscasts featuring contributions from the first reporter hired by WKPT-TV in its modern reincarnation, Ashton Bishop. Corresponding with the format change, the early weeknight update moved to 6 preceding ABC World News Tonight. In addition, local news and weather cut-ins were added at :25 and :55 past the hour on weekday mornings during Good Morning America (from 7 to 9 a.m.). All of the aforementioned programming aired in high definition under the branding 19 WKPT News. After hiring more personnel, WKPT resumed traditional full-length newscasts (which were seen weeknights at 6 and 11) on March 4, 2013, with anchors Jim Bailey and Liz Marrs. In 2013 morning cut-in anchor Ashton Bishop was named as the new co-anchor for the 6 and 11 newscasts with Bailey.

Following the announcement that it would lose its ABC affiliation, WKPT also announced that it would shut down its news department at the same time, owing to the "tough financial challenge" the station would face in running news without an affiliation with a major network. The news operation officially shut down January 29, 2016, with the final episode of A Closer Look aired on January 31, 2016.

== Technical information ==
=== Subchannels ===
The station's signal is multiplexed:

Subchannels of WKPT-TV
Channel	Res.	Short name	Programming
19.1	720p	COZI	Cozi TV
19.2	720p	MeTV	MeTV (WAPK-CD)
19.3	480i	LAFF	Laff
19.4	480i	IonMyst	Ion Mystery
19.5	480i	StartTV	Start TV
19.6	480i	Movies!	Movies!
19.7	480i	CourtTV	Court TV
19.8	480i	Toons	MeTV Toons

Simulcast of subchannels of another station

=== Translators ===
- WAPW-CD 23 Abingdon, VA
- WOPI-CD 11 Kingsport
- WKPT-CD 22 Kingsport

=== Analog-to-digital conversion ===
WKPT-TV shut down its analog signal, over UHF channel 19, on June 12, 2009, the official date on which full-power television stations in the United States transitioned from analog to digital broadcasts under federal mandate. The station's digital signal remained on its pre-transition UHF channel 27, using virtual channel 19.
