= WJHL-TV =

Television station in Johnson City, Tennessee

- Johnson City–; Kingsport–Bristol, Tennessee; Bristol, Virginia; United States
- City: Johnson City, Tennessee
- Channels: Digital: 9 (VHF); Virtual: 11
- Branding: NewsChannel 11; ABC Tri-Cities (11.2)

Programming
- Affiliations: 11.1: CBS; 11.2: ABC; 11.3: Antenna TV

Ownership
- Owner: Nexstar Media Group; (Nexstar Media Inc.)

History
- First air date: October 27, 1953
- Former channel numbers: Analog: 11 (VHF, 1953–2009); Digital: 58 (UHF, 1998–2009), 11 (VHF, 2009–2020)
- Former affiliations: All secondary: DuMont (1953–1956); NBC (1953–1956); ABC (1953–1969)
- Call sign meaning: Jay Birdwell and Hanes Lancaster (founder of WJHL radio)

Technical information
- Licensing authority: FCC
- Facility ID: 57826
- ERP: 38 kW
- HAAT: 703.2 m (2,307 ft)
- Transmitter coordinates: 36°25′54.7″N 82°8′15.2″W

Links
- Public license information: Public file; LMS
- Website: www.wjhl.com

WJHL-TV (channel 11) is a television station licensed to Johnson City, Tennessee, United States, serving the Tri-Cities area as an affiliate of CBS and ABC. The station is owned by Nexstar Media Group, and maintains studios on East Main Street in downtown Johnson City; its transmitter is located on Holston Mountain in the Cherokee National Forest.

== History ==
WJHL-TV began broadcasting on October 27, 1953. It was owned by Hanes Lancaster Sr. and his son Hanes Jr., along with WJHL radio (910 AM, now WJCW; and FM 101.5, now WQUT).

Hanes Jr., who was the radio station's sales manager, foresaw the potential of television, and pushed hard for building a television counterpart to WJHL radio even in a time when few people in the area had sets. Hanes Sr. was skeptical, but Hanes Jr. lined up several potential investors and was ready to stake out on his own to build a television station. Ultimately, Hanes Sr. gave in and took the project under his wing. It would be the second time that the Lancasters had taken a gamble on broadcasting; Hanes Sr. had founded WJHL radio in 1938 at the suggestion of his friend, Jay Birdwell, after his auto parts distribution business failed.

The Lancasters applied for a license in 1948, only to be derailed by the nationwide license freeze that had been imposed a few months earlier. After a 4 1/2 year wait, they were granted a license in January 1953. Studios were set up in the former main Post Office building in downtown Johnson City; channel 11 is still based there today.

In the summer of 1953, WJHL-TV was on track to be the first television station to sign on in East Tennessee, projecting to begin operations on October 17. At the time, the station's original transmission tower was being constructed on Tannery Knob in downtown Johnson City. With just a few weeks before sign-on, the guy wires snapped, sending the 550-foot (170 m) tower and its antenna crashing to the ground, falling just three inches (8 cm) from the transmission equipment. Despite the damage, only two people were injured. This enabled WROL-TV in Knoxville to beat WJHL-TV to the air by almost a month. Since many advertisers and banks were already skeptical about television's viability (the tower crash did not help), the Lancasters had to scramble for funding. They were able to get the station on the air more than a week later, but had to side-mount a much smaller replacement antenna on a wooden power pole the Johnson City Power Board installed at the last minute.

Originally, WJHL-TV was affiliated with all four television networks of the time—CBS, NBC, ABC, and DuMont. However, its primary affiliation has always been with CBS, due to that network's long-time affiliation with WJHL radio. In 1954, the WJHL-TV transmitter was relocated to Buffalo Mountain southwest of Johnson City, which is 1,200 feet (366 m) higher than Tannery Knob. From that location, the station was able to better reach Bristol, Kingsport and other areas of Eastern Tennessee, Southwestern Virginia, and Western North Carolina. Meanwhile, NBC moved to WCYB-TV on the Virginia side of Bristol when that station signed on in 1956. WJHL lost Dumont soon afterward when that network shut down. WJHL and WCYB shared ABC until 1969 when WKPT-TV in Kingsport signed on and became the market's ABC affiliate.

The Lancasters sold off their radio interests in 1960, and in turn sold WJHL-TV to Roy H. Park Broadcasting in 1964—earning a handsome return on their original investment from 26 years earlier. Around this time, the station adopted a logo featuring a U.S. highway sign with an "11" inside it, which remained in use until around 1987. The logo was already well known in the area, since alternate routes of US 11, US 11E and 11W, pass through most of the major cities and towns in the Tri-Cities. The shields were, and still are, quite prevalent in the area and became an instant promotional link for the station. Park Broadcasting was renamed Park Communications in the 1970s.

Hanes Lancaster, Jr. succeeded his father as station manager in 1954, and remained as station manager after the sale to Park. In 1989, Lancaster, Jr. was succeeded by Jack Dempsey, who held the post until June 2012, when he went to WCYB. Dan Cates was appointed General Manager of WJHL in August 2012, after being the news director of sister station WSPA-TV in Spartanburg, South Carolina. Many of its employees have stayed on for thirty years or more, which is unusual for what has always been a small market (it is currently the 93rd market, the smallest in the state with three full big three affiliates).

In 1969, WJHL moved its transmitter once again 800 feet (240 m) higher and further east, this time side by side with WKPT on the lower end of Holston High Point on Holston Mountain. With an antenna now at 2,224 feet (678 m) above average terrain, it was necessary to reduce full power analog visual to 245,000 watts from the normal 316,000 watts allocated to stations between VHF channel 7 to 13 with antennas below 2,000 feet (610 m) above average terrain. To this day, WQUT-FM (the former WJHL-FM) still broadcasts from WJHL-TV's old tower on Buffalo Mountain.

Logo used from 2009 to October 2012.

Media General acquired Park Communications and WJHL in 1997 and dropped its longtime brand of "TV 11" in favor of NewsChannel 11. The station began broadcasting a digital signal on UHF channel 58 in 1998. In May 2009, WJHL switched its branding from NewsChannel 11 to 11 Connects. WJHL reverted to the NewsChannel 11 branding in October 2012.

Under federal must-carry rules, broadcasters can either allow cable systems in their market to carry their signals for free or charge a fee under retransmission consent provisions. On December 3, 2008, it was announced that Inter Mountain Cable (IMC), a cable provider serving parts of Eastern Kentucky, would drop WJHL from its lineup unless an agreement was reached over retransmission consent. According to The Mountain Eagle, this dispute caused concern among officials in the city of Fleming-Neon where IMC held the cable television franchise there. The city council in Fleming-Neon stated that the removal of WJHL would violate IMC's franchise agreement.

=== WJHL-DT2 ===
WJHL-DT2, branded on air as ABC Tri-Cities, is the ABC-affiliated second digital subchannel of WJHL-TV, broadcasting in high definition on channel 11.2.

WJHL-DT2 was established in late 2006 as a simulcast of its 24-hour cable weather channel. In August 2011, WJHL-DT2 established a general entertainment format as a MeTV affiliate.

On January 4, 2016, Media General and ABC announced that WJHL-DT2 would become the Tri-Cities' ABC affiliate on February 1 of that year, ending that network's affiliation in the Tri-Cities on WKPT-TV and MeTV's affiliation with WJHL-DT2. The move reunited the network with WJHL, which had a secondary affiliation with ABC until WKPT's launch in 1969. MeTV was promptly picked up by WKPT's sister station WAPK-CD, while that station's MyNetworkTV affiliation moved to WKPT.

== News operation ==
WJHL's newscasts were simulcast on WKPT for four years. That station shut down its news department in February 2002. The simulcasts ceased in September 2006 (WKPT later restarted its own news operation, which itself shut down January 29, 2016). In late 2006, WJHL-TV launched a 24-hour cable weather channel. It was seen on most cable outlets in the area via digital cable and on digital channel 11.3; in 2015, the channel was replaced by Ion Television as a result of an affiliation deal between Media General and Ion. On August 11, 2008, Channel 11 debuted a new daytime show, Daytime Tri-Cities. The show is hosted by Chris McIntosh (Morgan King, a former weatherman at WKPT and WCYB, formerly filled his role) and Amy Lynn (who was an anchor at WCYB). In the November 2008 ratings period, WJHL's 11 p.m. news took over the ratings lead from WCYB for the first time in thirty years.

On April 21, 2010, WJHL management announced that the station would convert Channel 11 newscasts to high definition. On October 4, 2010, WJHL became the second station in the Tri-Cities market to convert its newscast in high definition.

When WJHL-DT2 switched from MeTV to ABC on February 1, 2016, WJHL's morning, 11 p.m., and weekend newscasts began simulcasting on the subchannel. In addition, WJHL-DT2 airs newscasts at 6:30 p.m. and 7:30 p.m., with ABC World News Tonight broadcast in between the two local newscasts at 7 p.m. The newscasts are branded ABC Tri-Cities News and are exclusive to WJHL-DT2.

In addition to its Johnson City studios and newsroom, WJHL operates news bureaus in the Progress Building in downtown Kingsport, on State Street in Bristol, Tennessee, and on Depot Street in Greeneville, Tennessee.

== Technical information ==
=== Subchannels ===
The station's signal is multiplexed:

Subchannels of WJHL-TV
Channel	Res.	Short name	Programming
11.1	1080i	WJHL-HD	CBS
11.2	720p	WJHL D2	ABC
11.3	480i	Antenna	Antenna TV

=== Analog-to-digital conversion ===
WJHL-TV shut down its analog signal, over VHF channel 11, on June 12, 2009, the official date on which full-power television stations in the United States transitioned from analog to digital broadcasts under federal mandate. The station's digital signal relocated from its pre-transition UHF channel 58, which was among the high band UHF channels (52–69) that were removed from broadcasting use as a result of the transition, to its analog-era VHF channel 11.

== See also ==
- TriCities.com
- List of television stations in Tennessee
