= WKTP =

Radio station in Jonesborough–Johnson City, Tennessee

- Jonesborough, Tennessee; United States
- Frequency: 1590 kHz
- Branding: ESPN Tri Cities

Programming
- Format: Sports
- Affiliations: ABC News Radio; ESPN Radio

Ownership
- Owner: Glenwood Communications Corporation; (Holston Valley Broadcasting Corporation)
- Sister stations: WKPT, WOPI, WRZK, WTFM, WVEK-FM

History
- Former call signs: WJSO (1958–1987); WQLS (1987); WUSJ (1987–1988)
- Call sign meaning: Disambiguation of sister stations WKPT (AM) and WKPT-TV

Technical information
- Licensing authority: FCC
- Facility ID: 27498
- Class: D
- Power: 2,500 watts day 37 watts night
- Transmitter coordinates: 36°19′53.4″N 82°28′25.5″W
- Translator: 97.7 W249AH (Johnson City)

Links
- Public license information: Public file; LMS
- Webcast: Listen live
- Website: espntricities.com

WKTP (1590 AM) is a radio station broadcasting a sports format. Licensed to Jonesborough, Tennessee, United States, the station is currently owned by Glenwood Communications Corporation (through subsidiary Holston Valley Broadcasting Corporation) and features programming from ESPN Radio.

== History ==
WKTP was first licensed in 1958, as WJSO, to the Mountain View Broadcasting Company in Jonesborough, Tennessee, for 5,000 watts daytime-only on 1590 kHz. The station had a Top 40 format. The call letters were changed to WQLS in early 1987, and to WUSJ later that year. In 1988 the call sign was changed to WKTP, and the station simulcast WKPT, 1400 AM in Kingsport, Tennessee.

=== Expanded Band assignment ===
On March 17, 1997, the Federal Communications Commission (FCC) announced that eighty-eight stations had been given permission to move to newly available "Expanded Band" transmitting frequencies, ranging from 1610 to 1700 kHz, with WKTP authorized to move from 1590 to 1680 kHz. However, the station never procured the Construction Permit needed to implement the authorization, so the expanded band station was never built.
