= WRZK =

- Colonial Heights, Tennessee; United States
- Broadcast area: Tri-Cities (Tennessee - Virginia)
- Frequency: 95.9 MHz
- Branding: 95.9 The Hog

Programming
- Format: Active rock
- Affiliations: Compass Media Networks

Ownership
- Owner: Glenwood Communications Corporation; (Holston Valley Broadcasting Corporation)
- Sister stations: WKPT, WKTP, WOPI, WTFM, WVEK-FM

History
- First air date: April 4, 1997
- Former call signs: WLJQ (1993–1997, CP)

Technical information
- Licensing authority: FCC
- Facility ID: 47076
- Class: C2
- ERP: 7,400 watts
- HAAT: 382 meters (1,253 ft)
- Transmitter coordinates: 36°31′36″N 82°35′13″W

Links
- Public license information: Public file; LMS
- Webcast: Listen live
- Website: wrzk.com

WRZK (95.9 FM, "95.9 The Hog") is a commercial radio station licensed to Colonial Heights, Tennessee, United States, and serving the Tri-Cities of Tennessee and Virginia. Owned by Glenwood Communications Corporation, through subsidiary Holston Valley Broadcasting Corporation, WRZK features an active rock format. The station's studios and transmitter are both located in Kingsport.

== History ==
The station signed on the air on April 4, 1997. While it was still a construction permit, the unbuilt station used the call sign WLJQ but just before it debuted, it switched its call letters. The Federal Communications Commission gave it the WRZK call sign on March 21, 1997.

Former logo

WRZK has always had a rock format. It was originally owned by Murray Communications with Dave Murray as the general manager.
