= WTFM =

- Kingsport, Tennessee; United States
- Broadcast area: Tri-Cities
- Frequency: 98.5 MHz (HD Radio)
- Branding: 98.5 WTFM

Programming
- Language: English
- Format: Adult contemporary

Ownership
- Owner: Glenwood Communications Corporation; (Holston Valley Broadcasting Corporation)
- Sister stations: WAPK-CD; WKPT; WKPT-TV; WKTP; WOPI; WOPI-CD; WRZK; WVEK-FM

History
- First air date: February 6, 1948
- Former call signs: WKPT-FM (1948–1982)

Technical information
- Licensing authority: FCC
- Facility ID: 27489
- Class: C
- ERP: 70,000 watts
- HAAT: 683 meters (2,241 ft)
- Transmitter coordinates: 36°25′54″N 82°08′15″W
- Translator: 105.7 W289BZ (Bristol)

Links
- Public license information: Public file; LMS
- Webcast: Listen live
- Website: wtfm.com

WTFM (98.5 FM), – branded as 98.5 WTFM - is an adult contemporary music formatted radio station licensed to Kingsport, Tennessee, and serving the Tri-Cities area. The station is owned by Glenwood Communications Corporation, through subsidiary Holston Valley Broadcasting Corporation.

== History ==
This station once broadcast as WKPT-FM and went on the air on February 6, 1948. The Federal Communications Commission assigned the WTFM call letters on September 6, 1982.

In January 1986, WTFM changed its format to soft adult contemporary. Its official slogans include "Better Music for a Better Workday" and "Your Official Listen At Work Station".
