= WKPT (AM) =

Radio station in Kingsport, Tennessee

- Kingsport, Tennessee; United States
- Broadcast area: Tri-Cities
- Frequency: 1400 kHz
- Branding: ESPN Tri-Cities

Programming
- Format: Sports
- Affiliations: ABC News Radio; ESPN Radio

Ownership
- Owner: Glenwood Communications Corporation; (Holston Valley Broadcasting Corporation)
- Sister stations: WAPK-CD, WKPT-TV, WKTP, WOPI, WOPI-CD, WRZK, WTFM, WVEK-FM

History
- First air date: July 14, 1940
- Call sign meaning: Kingsport

Technical information
- Licensing authority: FCC
- Facility ID: 27495
- Class: C
- Power: 1,000 watts (unlimited)
- Transmitter coordinates: 36°32′37″N 82°31′21″W
- Translator: 94.3 W232BP (Kingsport)

Links
- Public license information: Public file; LMS
- Webcast: Listen live
- Website: www.espntricities.com

WKPT (1400 kHz) is a North American AM radio station, located in Kingsport, Tennessee. It operates with a daytime/nighttime power of 1,000 watts. WKPT is one of the oldest radio stations in East Tennessee, first taking the airwaves in 1940.

== Programming ==
WKPT (AM) broadcasts an all-sports format featuring programming from ESPN Radio.

Local programming features "Sports Magazine," hosted by sports director Scott Gray, on Monday evenings. "Sports Magazine" has been a fixture on the station for more than two decades.

WKPT (AM) has long been the home of Dobyns-Bennett (Kingsport) High School sports, heard on the flagship frequency of 1400 kHz and its translator at 94.3 FM.

In the late 1980s, coverage of Science Hill (Johnson City) High School was added on 1590 kHz (the former WJSO, which broadcasts from nearby Jonesborough TN) and its translator at 97.7 FM. These broadcasts, featuring Tim Cable on play-by-play and Scott Gray on color analysis, have won state awards from the Associated Press.

And in the early 1990s, Bristol coverage of Tennessee High School Sports was added on WOPI which has broadcast since 1929 (it was the Tri-Cities' first broadcast station) and is at 1490 kHz. WOPI employs a Bristol translator at 97.9 FM.

WKPT has, for decades, featured live play-by-play sports of the University Of Tennessee/Knoxville (the "Vols" or "Big Orange") from the Vol Radio Network. This included the 1999 Tostitos Fiesta Bowl in which the Vols defeated the Florida State Seminoles 23-16 for the first BCS national championship. That game was the final football broadcast for 30-year announce team John Ward and Bill Anderson (Ward would announce the 1998-99 Vol men's basketball season before retiring; he did the basketball games solo).

== Sister stations ==
WKPT, WOPI-1490 Bristol, and WKTP-1590 Jonesborough/Johnson City are owned by Holston Valley Broadcasting Corporation, a subsidiary of Glenwood Communications Corporation. Each carries a substantial amount of the same programming each week but breaks away for local sports, specialized programming, and other community events.

== Translators ==
Call sign	Frequency	City of license	FID	ERP (W)	Class	FCC info
W232BP	94.3 FM	Kingsport, TN	158040	250	D	LMS
W249AH	97.7 FM	Johnson City, TN	27499	40	D	LMS
W251CJ	98.1 FM	Bristol, TN	27506	250	D	LMS

Holston Valley Broadcasting also operates television stations WKPT-TV 19 (Cozi TV) and WAPK-CD 36 (MeTV). Other radio stations in the chain include WTFM-FM, WMEV-FM, WVEK-FM and WRZK-FM (95.9 The Hog).

The station was assigned the WKPT call letters by the Federal Communications Commission.

== History ==
From its initial sign-on, in 1940, WKPT (AM) broadcast a full-service format of music, news, and play-by-play sports. WKPT promoted itself as "The Nation's Model Station" and was an NBC Radio Network affiliate.

WKPT's studios were destroyed by fire in September 1946. New, expanded studios were formally opened in April 1948.

Notable on-air personalities (a * indicates the personality is deceased) were:

- Paul Overbay (early Program Director and announcer, dating back to virtually the station's 1940 beginnings);
- Charlie Deming (read on about "The Gloom Chaser");
- Martin Karant (perhaps the most notable voice and the personality with whom the station was most closely identified);
- Bill Freehoff (who became notable for his editorials and their simple close of "Think about it!");
- Bill Trailer;

George DeVault (who started as a student announcer at age 14, and has served as president and CEO of Holston Valley Broadcasting Corporation for nearly four decades);

George Sells (who later worked TV news in Detroit and other markets under his real name, and for ABC Radio News as "George Caldwell"); and

- John Palmer (who later worked for NBC-TV on The Today Show and for PBS).

Later personalities included:

Bob Morris (went on to jobs at several notable Top-40 stations);

Bob Lawrence (still employed in the market as a systems specialist or "IT guy");

Carl Swann (served in many capacities for WKPT, later became half of WTFM's first "male/female" morning show, "Carl & Jody," and is now half of a talk morning show across the market);

Ted Tate (who went on to work for the Voice Of America in Washington DC);

- Doug Newton (took over mornings for a time after Charlie Deming's retirement, and was an identifiable play-by-play voice for many years);
- Gordon Light (who went on to jobs at high-profile 50,000-watt stations including WLAC/Nashville and "The Big One" WLW/Cincinnati);
- Mike Padgett (started radio at 15, came to WKPT at 16, became the station's "voice of the new young generation," and was associated with the station for over 30 years); and

Elva Marie (who still works for sister station WTFM in the midday slot).

In the latter 1970s the station leaned more in a Top-40 direction and switched network affiliations to ABC, which meant Paul Harvey began to be heard on WKPT.

In January 1986, when 100,000-watt sister station WTFM switched to adult contemporary music, WKPT took over WTFM's former beautiful music format.

Later, in 1993, the station switched to adult standards from ABC Radio Networks.

WKPT has a colorful programming past, as it broadcast full-service programming for more than 70 years prior to the beginnings of sports-talk. The music featured during the full-service years included big-band, swing, standards, adult contemporary, Top-40, instrumental beautiful music, and finally oldies.

The early-morning show on WKPT was a unique experience for the station's first three decades, as it was hosted by Charles Preston "Charlie" Deming. The story that has been handed down through the years has it that the then-manager of the station was in Asheville, North Carolina in the early 1940s, heard Deming's rich baritone voice calling out bus arrivals, and arranged on the spot to move Deming to Kingsport and hire him. For about 30 years, multiple generations of Kingsporters awoke to "The Gloom Chaser," which was used interchangeably to refer to Deming and to his show. One of his trademarks was to ask his listeners to "join him for a little coffee" and then audibly slurp from his mug. Deming's last day on the station was in late 1973, by which time he had cut back to Saturdays only. Charlie Deming died in 1974 in a significant "end-of-an-era" moment for WKPT.

Since other local AM stations signed off at sunset for many years, WKPT would appeal to younger listeners beginning in the early evening. Some of the popular shows in this vein were "Rock-O-Rama" and "The Midnight Sun" (which featured Top-40 music and were hosted by Bob Morris, Bob Lawrence and others), and "A New Day" (which offered more progressive programming and was hosted by Ted Tate, Mike Padgett and others).

Mike Padgett was a very exciting personality, joined the station in 1974 while still in high school, was one of the first staffers to enthusiastically bring a new and youthful energy to WKPT, and became the popular de facto "voice of the new young generation" for the station. Mike died in October 2017 at 59.

WKPT has long been famous for beginning programming which goes on to enjoy long runs. One such program was the mid-morning offering "Housewife Serenade" hosted by longtime personality Martin Karant. It was on the air for three decades and was broadcast live, daily, from the now-defunct Oakwood Supermarket on Eastman Road.

After Karant left the station in the early 1970s (he would return a decade later), "Housewife Serenade" was hosted to its conclusion by Doug Newton. (Newton, in addition to serving as an on-air personality, was a pivotal part of WKPT's live play-by-play sports until the 1980s.)

In 1985, an attempt was made to re-create the "live-midmorning-show-from-a-grocery-store" concept as WKPT began "AM Kingsport" from Food City on Eastman Road, coincidentally only hundreds of feet from where Oakwood (host site of "Housewife Serenade") had been. "AM Kingsport" was initially hosted by Ohio native Judy Harrison for its first 2 1/2 years. It was then taken over by native East Tennessean Janet Johnson, who served for more than two decades. The show was renamed "AM Tri-Cities" in the late 1980s to reflect the fact that WKPT had begun simulcasting its signal to Johnson City TN (Bristol TN/VA was added in the early 1990s). The show saw only its third host when Johnson retired and former City-Of-Kingsport Transportation Director Dave Light took over. When the station changed formats to sports talk, more than 25 years after "AM Kingsport" had begun, the show (by this time originating from a new Food City in virtually the same location) was re-christened "The Dave Light Show." Light retired in the fall of 2026.

Another longtime fixture on the station during its full-service years was the "Five-O'Clock Shadow Show," a program designed to ease the post-WWII working listener home from work during the 5-pm hour. "The Shadow Show," as it came to be affectionately known by the station and by listeners as well, was begun and hosted by Martin Karant, who would frequently sit his young son Kenneth on his lap, and they would read the newspaper comics on-air together.

The elder Karant notably sang both the show's opening theme, which was his lyrics to "Five O'Clock Whistle", and the closing theme, which was the standard tune, "Me And My Shadow."

The "Five O'Clock Shadow Show" was taken over, upon Karant's early-1970s departure from the station, by afternoon host Bob Lawrence, who would host the show for its remaining years until the late 1970s.

A short-lived, though popular, show in the 1980s was "Live At Ciatti's" from Ciatti's Italian Ristorante' on North Eastman Road. The show was hosted by Martin Karant (who had returned to company employment in 1982) and featured live music and singing by Johnson City musician Glen Shell. Karant and Shell would take requests from patrons in the restaurant and by phone from listeners. The show lasted about three years; the restaurant has since closed.

Martin Karant had a storied career with the WKPT stations (AM, FM beginning in 1948, and TV beginning in 1969). He was hired in 1942 at about age 24, served in virtually every management position the station had, and left in the early 1970s for a national position in Chicago with Elks International. (He had turned down an offer from NBC, preferring instead to work for WKPT.) He returned to the stations in 1982 to host the morning show on sister station WTFM, moved back to WKPT in 1986 when the stations swapped formats, and remained with the station until his retirement in 1998 at the age of 80. Martin Karant died in 2003, having turned 86, and was considered the last link to the station's storied early history.

WKPT also aired noted syndicated programming during its full-service years. Among these were "American Top 40" hosted by Casey Kasem, "Dick Clark's Rock, Roll & Remember" hosted by Dick Clark, and "Al Mitchell's Rare & Scratchy Rock & Roll" hosted by Allen "Al" Mitchell (whose radio resume included a stint as Program Director of legendary powerhouse Top-40 station WOWO (AM) in Fort Wayne, Indiana). These shows aired primarily in the late 70s and early-to-mid 80s.
