= WOPI (AM) =

- Bristol, Tennessee; United States
- Frequency: 1490 kHz
- Branding: ESPN Tri-Cities

Programming
- Format: Sports
- Affiliations: ABC News Radio; ESPN Radio

Ownership
- Owner: Glenwood Communications Corporation; (Holston Valley Broadcasting Corporation)
- Sister stations: WKPT, WKTP, WRZK, WTFM

History
- First air date: 1929
- Call sign meaning: "Watch Our Popularity Increase"

Technical information
- Licensing authority: FCC
- Facility ID: 31405
- Class: C
- Power: 1,000 watts unlimited
- Transmitter coordinates: 36°35′45.0″N 82°9′42.0″W
- Translator: 98.1 W251CJ (Bristol)

Links
- Public license information: Public file; LMS
- Webcast: Listen live
- Website: espntricities.com

WOPI (1490 kHz) is a sports formatted broadcast radio station licensed to Bristol, Tennessee, United States. WOPI is owned and operated by Glenwood Communications Corporation though subsidiary Holston Valley Broadcasting Corporation.

== History ==
WOPI signed on June 15, 1929 at State and 22nd Streets in Bristol, Tennessee, as the first radio station in the Tri-Cities. W.A. Wilson, former chief telegraph operator for Western Union's Bristol office, came up with the plan for a radio station when he spent several years selling and installing radios. His son James C. Wilson worked at WOPI and later bought the Tri-Cities' second-oldest radio station, Johnson City-based WJHL, and changed the calls to WJCW. An early show on the station was "WOPI Jamboree", which featured live country music. In the 1940s, WOPI and WKPT formed a network called "the Sister City Network" for broadcasting local information.

WOPI-FM signed on Christmas Day 1946 as the area's first FM station. It was sold to the owner of WKYE in the 1960s and is now WXBQ-FM.

In 1966, owner Tri-Cities Broadcasting Company successfully requested that the FCC have the station jointly licensed to Bristol, Tennessee and Bristol, Virginia. Wilson wanted to emphasize that the two Bristols were essentially a single community.

In 1990, WOPI was bankrupt and Joe Morrell bought the station. Morrell wanted to increase the amount of country music on the station, bringing it back to its roots. In 1991, WOPI joined the WKPT network. Glenwood Broadcasting, owner of WKPT, bought the station in 1996. For most of the time since 1991, WOPI has been a simulcast of WKPT, though it breaks off from the simulcast to air Tennessee High sports.

== Translator ==
In addition to the main station, WOPI is relayed by an FM translator to widen its broadcast area.

Broadcast translator for WOPI
Call sign	Frequency	City of license	FID	ERP (W)	HAAT	Class	FCC info
W251CJ	98.1 FM	Bristol, Tennessee	27506	250	70 m (230 ft)	D	LMS
