= Virginia Tech Sports Network =

College sports radio network

The Virginia Tech Sports Network is the radio network broadcasting athletic events of the Virginia Tech Hokies games, primarily football and men's basketball. The radio network was managed by ISP Sports until that company merged into IMG (now known as Learfield IMG College) in 2010.

== Stations ==
Callsign	Frequency	Band	City	State	Network status
WKEX	93.1	FM	Blacksburg	Virginia	Flagship
WFHG-FM	92.9	FM	Abingdon-Bristol	Virginia	Affiliate
WBBC-FM	93.5	FM	Blackstone	Virginia	Affiliate
WHKX	106.3	FM	Bluefield	West Virginia	Affiliate
WDCH-FM	99.1	FM	Bowie	Maryland	Alternate affiliate
WFNZ	610	AM	Charlotte	North Carolina	Affiliate
W273DA	102.5	FM	Charlotte	North Carolina	n/a (WFNZ relay)
WKAV	1400	AM	Charlottesville	Virginia	Affiliate
W231AD	94.1	FM	Charlottesville	Virginia	n/a (WKAV relay)
WDIC-FM	92.1	FM	Clintwood	Virginia	Affiliate
WCGX	1360	AM	Galax	Virginia	Affiliate
W243EH	96.5	FM	Galax	Virginia	n/a (WCGX relay)
WMNA-FM	106.3	FM	Gretna	Virginia	Affiliate
WQPO-HD2*	100.7	FM	Harrisonburg	Virginia	Affiliate
W267BA	101.3	FM	Harrisonburg	Virginia	n/a (WQPO-HD2 relay)
WLNI	105.9	FM	Lynchburg	Virginia	Affiliate
WUKZ	1010	AM	Marion	Virginia	Affiliate
W241AP	96.1	FM	Midlothian	Virginia	n/a (WRVA relay)
WJFK	1580	AM	Morningside	Maryland	Alternate affiliate
WNIS	790	AM	Norfolk	Virginia	Affiliate
WESR-FM	103.3	FM	Onley	Virginia	Affiliate
WESR	1330	AM	Onley	Virginia	Affiliate
W289CE	105.7	FM	Onley	Virginia	n/a (WESR relay)
WRNL	910	AM	Richmond	Virginia	Affiliate
W286DJ	96.1	FM	Richmond	Virginia	n/a (WRNL relay)
WRVA	1140	AM	Richmond	Virginia	Alternate affiliate
WFIR	960	AM	Roanoke	Virginia	Affiliate
W297BC	107.3	FM	Roanoke	Virginia	n/a (WFIR relay)
WYTI	1570	AM	Rocky Mount	Virginia	Affiliate
W283CQ	104.5	FM	Rocky Mount	Virginia	n/a (WYTI relay)
W266BM	101.1	FM	Rural Retreat	Virginia	n/a (WUKZ relay)
WTON	1240	AM	Staunton	Virginia	Affiliate
W277BG	93.3	FM	Timberlake	Virginia	n/a (WMNA-FM relay)
W233CK	94.5	FM	Troutville	Virginia	n/a (WFIR relay)
WNNT-FM	107.5	FM	Warsaw	Virginia	Affiliate
WJFK-FM	106.7	FM	Washington, D.C.	District of Columbia	Affiliate
WDCH-FM	99.1	FM	Washington, D.C.	District of Columbia	Backup Affiliate Through 2026 When WJFK Is Unavailable
WIGO-FM	104.9	FM	White Stone	Virginia	Affiliate
WINC	1400	AM	Winchester	Virginia	Affiliate
WXBX	95.3	FM	Wytheville	Virginia	Affiliate
WHQX	107.7	FM	Gary	West Virginia	Affiliate
