= Bristol, Tennessee =

City in Tennessee, United States

Bristol
- City
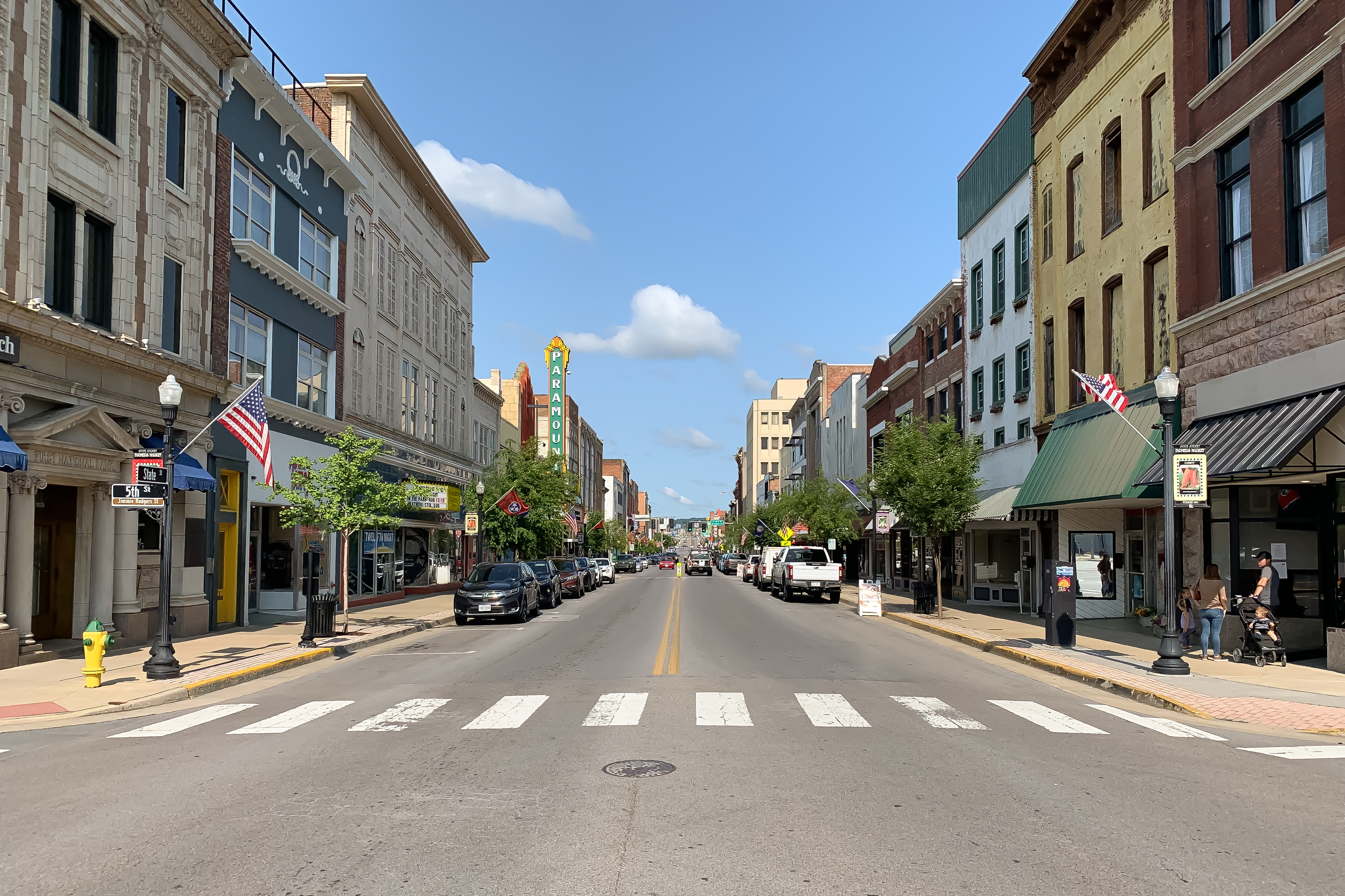
- State Street in downtown Bristol, Tennessee (left) and Bristol, Virginia (right)

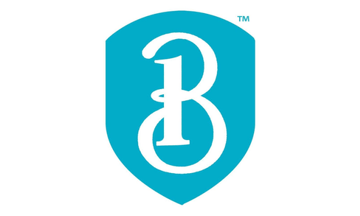
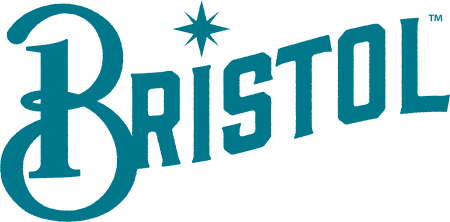
- Flag Seal Logo
- Nickname: The Birthplace of Country Music
- Motto: A Good Place To Live
- Location of Bristol in Sullivan County, Tennessee
- Coordinates: 36°35′N 82°11′W
- Country: United States
- State: Tennessee
- County: Sullivan
- Incorporated: 1856
- Named for: Bristol, England

Government
  - Mayor: Vince Turner
  - Vice Mayor: Lea Powers
  - City Manager: Kelli Bourgeois

Area
  - Total: 32.83 sq mi (85.03 km^{2})
  - Land: 32.68 sq mi (84.63 km^{2})
  - Water: 0.15 sq mi (0.40 km^{2})
- Elevation: 1,677 ft (511 m)

Population (2020)
  - Total: 27,147
  - Density: 830.8/sq mi (320.77/km^{2})
- Time zone: UTC−5 (Eastern)
  - Summer (DST): UTC−4 (EDT)
- ZIP Codes: 37617, 37620, 37621 & 37625
- Area codes: 423 and 729
- FIPS code: 47-08540
- GNIS feature ID: 1327702
- Website: www.bristoltn.gov

Bristol is a city in Sullivan County, Tennessee, United States. The population was 27,147 at the 2020 census. It is the twin city of Bristol, Virginia, which lies directly across the state line between Tennessee and Virginia. Bristol, TN and Bristol, VA are two separate, though unified, twin cities. They share a unified metropolitan area, meaning they function as one community with a shared State Street as their main dividing line, but have separate governments, police departments, and libraries. It is a principal city in the Kingsport–Bristol metropolitan area, which had a population of 307,614 in 2020. The metro area is a component of the larger Tri-Cities region of Tennessee and Virginia, with a population of 508,260 in 2020.

Bristol is known for being the site of some of the earliest commercial recordings of country music, showcasing Jimmie Rodgers and the Carter Family, and later a favorite venue of mountain musician Uncle Charlie Osborne. The U.S. Congress recognized Bristol as the "Birthplace of Country Music" in 1998, and the Birthplace of Country Music Museum is located nearby in Bristol, Virginia. It also is the birthplace of Tennessee Ernie Ford.

Bristol is the site of Bristol Motor Speedway, a NASCAR short track. The world's fifth-largest coal producer, Alpha Metallurgical Resources, is based in Bristol.

== History ==
Before 1852, the land where Bristol is located was owned by Reverend James King. His son-in-law, Joseph R. Anderson of Blountville, Tennessee, bought 100 acres (40 ha) of the plantation and named it Bristol. The G.W. Blackley House, one of the oldest houses in Bristol, was constructed in 1869.

=== Country music ===
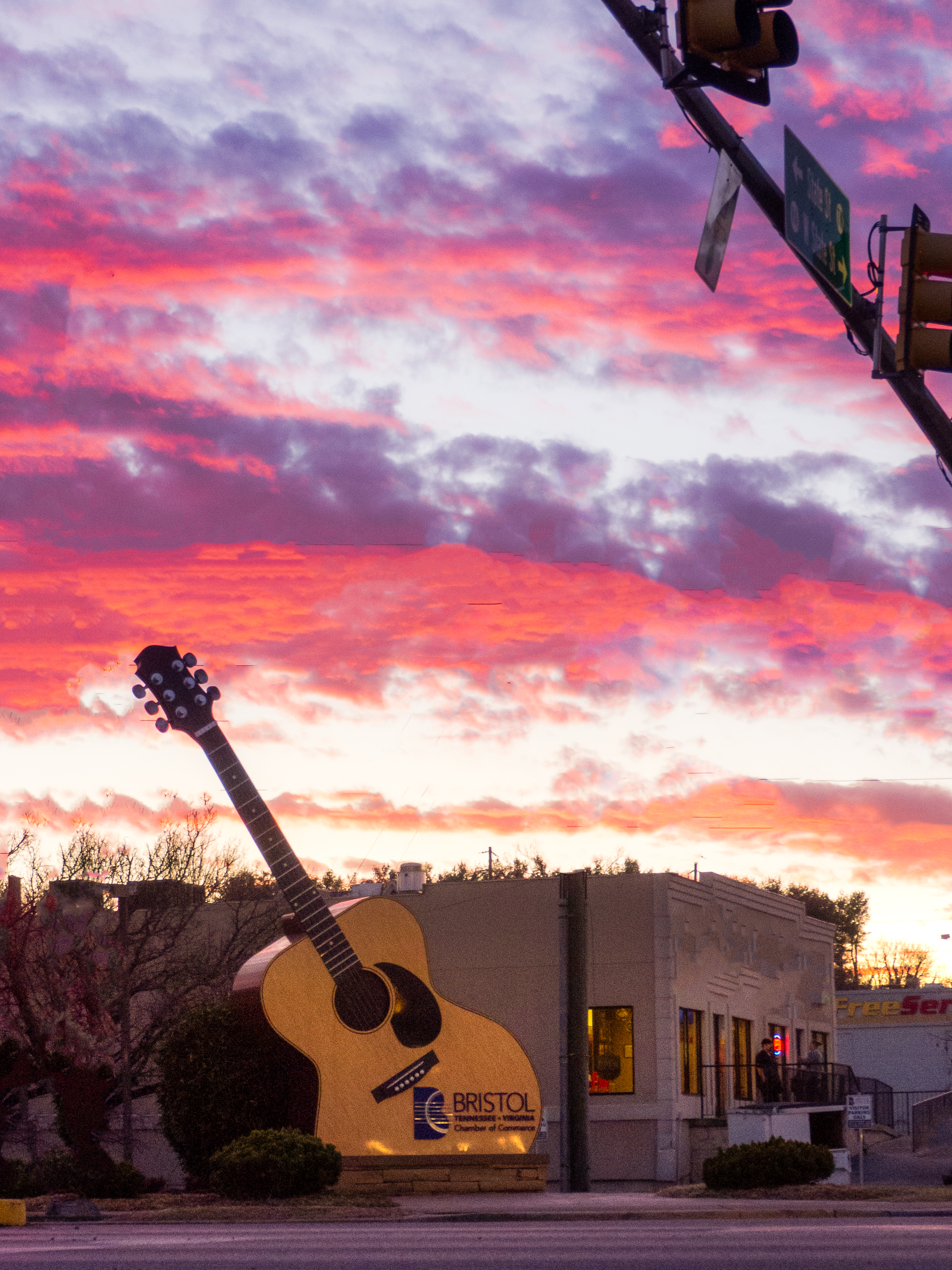
The Bristol Guitar

The U.S. Congress declared Bristol to be the "Birthplace of Country Music", according to a resolution passed in 1998, recognizing its contributions to early country music recordings and influence, and the Birthplace of Country Music Museum is located in Bristol.

In 1927, record producer Ralph Peer of Victor Records began recording local musicians in Bristol, to attempt to capture the local sound of traditional "folk" music of the region. One of these local sounds was created by the Carter Family, who got their start on July 31, 1927, when A.P. Carter and his family journeyed from Maces Spring, Virginia, to Bristol to audition for Ralph Peer, who was seeking new talent for the relatively embryonic recording industry. They received $50 for each song they recorded. That same visit by Peer to Bristol also resulted in the first recordings by Jimmie Rodgers.

Since 1994, the Birthplace of Country Music Alliance has promoted the city as a destination to learn about country music and the city's role in the creation of an entire music genre. The alliance is organizing the building of a new Cultural Heritage Center to help educate the public about the history of country music in the region. On August 1, 2014, the Birthplace of Country Music Museum opened in Bristol, Virginia to commemorate the historical significance of the Bristol sessions. The museum features a 24,000-ft building that houses core exhibits, space for special exhibits, a performance theater, and a radio station.

Every year, during the third weekend in September, a music festival called the Bristol Rhythm & Roots Reunion takes place. The festival is held downtown, where Tennessee and Virginia meet, and it celebrates Bristol's heritage as the birthplace of country music.

== Geography ==
According to the United States Census Bureau, the city has a total area of 29.5 square miles (76.4 km^{2}), of which 29.4 square miles (76.1 km^{2}) are land and 0.1 square miles (0.3 km^{2}) (0.44%) is covered by water.

=== Climate ===
Like much of the rest of the state, Bristol has a humid subtropical climate (Köppen climate classification: Cfa), although with significantly cooler temperatures, especially in the summer, due to elevation; it is part of USDA hardiness zone 6b, with areas to the southwest falling in zone 7a. The normal monthly mean temperature ranges from 35.2 °F (1.8 °C) in January to 74.6 °F (23.7 °C) in July, while, on average, 8.8 days have temperatures at or below freezing and 17 days with highs at or above 90 °F (32 °C) per year. The all-time record low is −21 °F (−29 °C), set on January 21, 1985, while the all-time record high is 103 °F (39 °C), set on June 30, 2012.

Precipitation is low compared to much of East Tennessee, averaging 41.0 inches (1,040 mm) annually, and reaches a low during autumn. The rainiest calendar day on record is October 16, 1964, when 3.65 inches (93 mm) of rain fell; monthly precipitation has ranged from 0.02 inches (0.51 mm) in October 2002 to 12.70 inches (323 mm) in July 2012. Bristol's normal (1981–2010) winter snowfall stands at 13.3 inches (34 cm), significantly more than what most of Tennessee receives. The most snow in one calendar day was 16.2 inches (41 cm) on November 21, 1952, while the most in one month is 27.9 inches (71 cm) during March 1960, which contributed to the winter of 1959–60, with a total of 51.0 inches (130 cm), finishing as the snowiest on record.

Climate data for Bristol, Tennessee (Tri-Cities Regional Airport), 1991–2020 normals, (Note: Mean monthly maxima and minima (i.e. the highest and lowest temperature readings during an entire month or year) calculated based on data at said location from 1991 to 2020.) extremes 1937–present
Month	Jan	Feb	Mar	Apr	May	Jun	Jul	Aug	Sep	Oct	Nov	Dec	Year
Record high °F (°C)	79 (26)	82 (28)	85 (29)	90 (32)	94 (34)	103 (39)	102 (39)	101 (38)	100 (38)	94 (34)	84 (29)	78 (26)	103 (39)
Mean maximum °F (°C)	67.4 (19.7)	69.8 (21.0)	76.6 (24.8)	83.8 (28.8)	87.4 (30.8)	91.6 (33.1)	93.0 (33.9)	92.2 (33.4)	90.1 (32.3)	83.3 (28.5)	74.9 (23.8)	67.9 (19.9)	94.3 (34.6)
Mean daily maximum °F (°C)	46.5 (8.1)	50.9 (10.5)	59.4 (15.2)	69.4 (20.8)	77.1 (25.1)	83.8 (28.8)	86.4 (30.2)	85.8 (29.9)	80.7 (27.1)	70.2 (21.2)	58.7 (14.8)	49.5 (9.7)	68.2 (20.1)
Daily mean °F (°C)	36.4 (2.4)	40.0 (4.4)	47.4 (8.6)	56.4 (13.6)	64.7 (18.2)	72.3 (22.4)	75.6 (24.2)	74.5 (23.6)	68.6 (20.3)	57.3 (14.1)	46.4 (8.0)	39.3 (4.1)	56.6 (13.7)
Mean daily minimum °F (°C)	26.3 (−3.2)	29.2 (−1.6)	35.4 (1.9)	43.3 (6.3)	52.3 (11.3)	60.7 (15.9)	64.7 (18.2)	63.2 (17.3)	56.4 (13.6)	44.3 (6.8)	34.2 (1.2)	29.2 (−1.6)	44.9 (7.2)
Mean minimum °F (°C)	7.6 (−13.6)	11.9 (−11.2)	18.4 (−7.6)	27.7 (−2.4)	36.9 (2.7)	49.0 (9.4)	56.2 (13.4)	54.5 (12.5)	43.3 (6.3)	28.8 (−1.8)	19.4 (−7.0)	13.2 (−10.4)	4.5 (−15.3)
Record low °F (°C)	−21 (−29)	−15 (−26)	−2 (−19)	21 (−6)	30 (−1)	38 (3)	45 (7)	43 (6)	33 (1)	20 (−7)	5 (−15)	−9 (−23)	−21 (−29)
Average precipitation inches (mm)	3.65 (93)	3.81 (97)	3.96 (101)	3.79 (96)	3.82 (97)	3.92 (100)	5.00 (127)	3.76 (96)	2.84 (72)	2.52 (64)	3.14 (80)	3.76 (96)	43.97 (1,117)
Average snowfall inches (cm)	3.0 (7.6)	3.0 (7.6)	1.1 (2.8)	0.1 (0.25)	0.0 (0.0)	0.0 (0.0)	0.0 (0.0)	0.0 (0.0)	0.0 (0.0)	0.0 (0.0)	0.3 (0.76)	1.7 (4.3)	9.2 (23)
Average precipitation days (≥ 0.01 in)	12.7	12.7	13.6	11.7	12.6	12.4	12.8	10.8	8.4	8.5	9.8	12.2	138.2
Average snowy days (≥ 0.1 in)	2.8	2.7	1.1	0.2	0.0	0.0	0.0	0.0	0.0	0.0	0.4	1.6	8.8
Source: NOAA

== Demographics ==
Historical population
Census	Pop.	Note	%±
1880	1,647		—
1890	3,324		101.8%
1900	5,271		58.6%
1910	7,148		35.6%
1920	8,047		12.6%
1930	12,005		49.2%
1940	14,004		16.7%
1950	16,771		19.8%
1960	17,582		4.8%
1970	20,064		14.1%
1980	23,986		19.5%
1990	23,421		−2.4%
2000	24,821		6.0%
2010	26,702		7.6%
2020	27,147		1.7%
2025 (est.)	28,107	▲	3.5%
U.S. Decennial Census; 2018 Estimate

=== 2020 census ===
As of the 2020 census, Bristol had a population of 27,147, 11,891 households, and 6,808 families residing in the city.

Racial composition as of the 2020 census
Race	Number	Percent
White	24,400	89.9%
Black or African American	812	3.0%
American Indian and Alaska Native	58	0.2%
Asian	246	0.9%
Native Hawaiian and Other Pacific Islander	11	0.0%
Some other race	293	1.1%
Two or more races	1,327	4.9%
Hispanic or Latino (of any race)	686	2.5%

As of the 2020 census, the median age was 43.6 years; 19.4% of residents were under the age of 18, and 21.3% of residents were 65 years of age or older. For every 100 females there were 93.3 males, and for every 100 females age 18 and over there were 90.8 males age 18 and over.

As of the 2020 census, there were 11,891 households in Bristol, of which 25.4% had children under the age of 18 living in them. Of all households, 41.4% were married-couple households, 20.0% were households with a male householder and no spouse or partner present, and 31.4% were households with a female householder and no spouse or partner present. About 34.4% of all households were made up of individuals and 15.0% had someone living alone who was 65 years of age or older.

As of the 2020 census, there were 13,161 housing units, of which 9.6% were vacant. The homeowner vacancy rate was 2.2% and the rental vacancy rate was 9.3%.

As of the 2020 census, 97.3% of residents lived in urban areas, while 2.7% lived in rural areas.

=== 2000 census ===
As of the census of 2000, 24,821 people, 10,648 households, and 6,825 families were residing in the city. The population density in 2000 was 846 people per square mile (326.5/km^{2}). The 11,511 housing units averaged 392.2 per square mile (151.4/km^{2}). The racial makeup of the city was 95.15% White, 2.97% African American, 0.31% Native American, 0.64% Asian, 0.24% from other races, and 0.70% from two or more races. Hispanics or Latinos of any race were 0.68% of the population.

Of the 10,648 households, 26.2% had children under the age of 18 living with them, 49.0% were married couples living together, 11.4% had a female householder with no husband present, and 35.9% were not families. Nearly 32% of all households were made up of individuals, and 14.1% had someone living alone who was 65 years of age or older. The average household size was 2.26, and the average family size was 2.84.

In the city, the age distribution was 21.1% under 18, 9.1% from 18 to 24, 27.2% from 25 to 44, 24.7% from 45 to 64, and 17.9% who were 65 or older. The median age was 40 years. For every 100 females, there were 90.6 males. For every 100 females age 18 and over, there were 87.3 males.

The median income for a household in the city was $30,039, and for a family was $37,341. Males had a median income of $28,210 versus $21,173 for females. The per capita income for the city was $18,535. About 11.5% of families and 15.0% of the population were below the poverty line, including 19.4% of those under age 18 and 12.0% of those age 65 or over.

== Sports ==
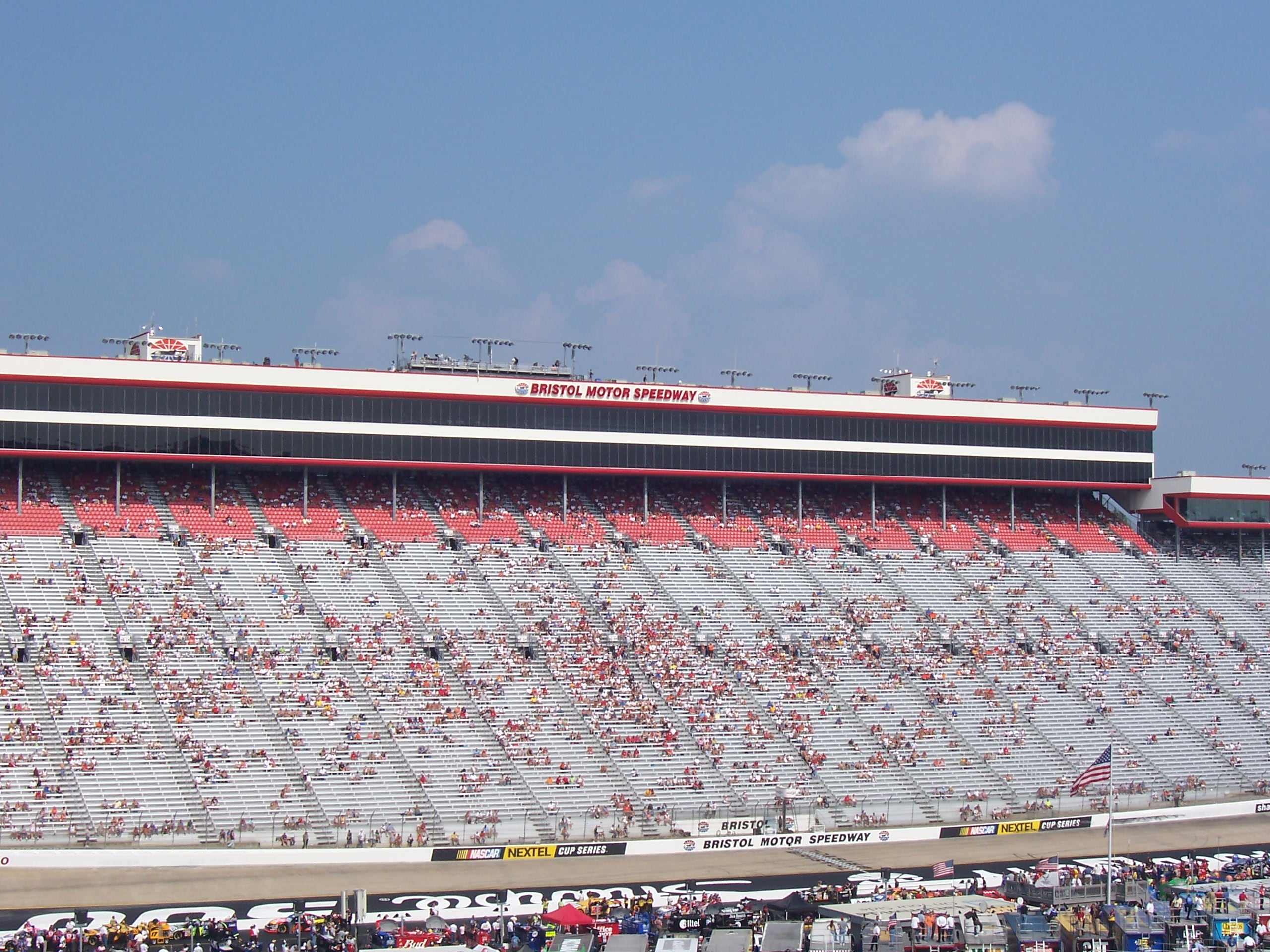
Bristol Motor Speedway

Bristol is the location of Bristol Motor Speedway, a motorsports venue that hosts several NASCAR events. It is also home to Bristol Dragway, which hosts the Ford Thunder Valley Nationals, an NHRA national event.

A Pittsburgh Pirates rookie Minor League Baseball affiliate, the Bristol Pirates, played its home games at DeVault Memorial Stadium in Bristol, Virginia, from 1969 to 2020. In conjunction with a contraction of Minor League Baseball beginning with the 2021 season, the Appalachian League, in which the Pirates played, was reorganized as a collegiate summer baseball league, and the Pirates were replaced by a new franchise in the revamped league designed for rising college freshman and sophomores.

== Education ==
=== Colleges and universities ===
- King University
- Graham Bible College

=== Primary and secondary schools ===
Bristol Tennessee City Schools operates public schools serving almost all of the city, with Tennessee High School being its public high school. Small sections are in the Sullivan County School District.

Slater High School in Bristol closed in 1965 following desegregation.

== Media ==
Television:

- WCYB-TV (NBC on 5.1, The CW on 5.2 and Fox on 5.3)
- WEMT-TV (Roar on 39.1)

Note-WEMT is licensed to Greeneville, Tennessee, but co-located with sister station WCYB-TV.

=== Radio ===
- WZAP (AM 690 kHz) Christian
- WFHG (FM 92.9 MHz) SuperTalk WFHG
- WWTB (AM 980 kHz) The Sports Fox
- WXBQ (FM 96.9 MHz) Twenty-four Carrot Country
- WAEZ (FM 94.9 MHz) Electric 94.9
- WEXX (FM 99.3 MHz) The X 99.3
- WTFM (FM 98.5 MHz) WTFM 98.5
- WBCM-LP (FM 100.1 MHz) WBCM Radio Bristol

=== Newspapers ===
- Bristol Herald Courier

== Infrastructure ==
=== Fire department ===
The Bristol Fire Department has 82 full-time and six part-time employees. It responds to over 5,000 calls per year and has five stations. The department is accredited by the Commission on Fire Accreditation International.

=== Police department ===
The Bristol Police Department is the municipal law enforcement agency for the city. The department has 73 sworn officers and 27 civilian support staff. It also makes use of citizen volunteers as an auxiliary staff, which saves the department over $100,000 annually.

== Notable people ==
- Clarence Ashley, old-time musician
- George Lafayette Carter, entrepreneur
- John I. Cox, Governor of Tennessee (1905−1907)
- Cara Cunningham, internet celebrity and blogger
- Tennessee Ernie Ford (1919–1991), actor, singer
- Justin Grimm, retired professional baseball player who last played for the Oakland Athletics
- Vivian Wilson Henderson, educator and human rights activist
- Doyle Lawson, Grammy-nominated bluegrass musician and frontman of Doyle Lawson and Quicksilver
- Dave Loggins, songwriter, recording artist
- David Massengill, folk singer-songwriter
- Jayma Mays, actress
- Ricky Morton, professional wrestler and WWE Hall of Famer; one half of tag team Rock N Roll Express
- William H. Neal, politician
- Eureka O'Hara, drag queen
- Chase Owens, professional wrestler
- Davyd Whaley, painter
- Chris Crocker, internet personality
