= Bristol Broadcasting Company =

- Logo of Bristol Broadcasting
- Company type: Private
- Industry: Entertainment, Broadcasting
- Founded: early 1950s
- Headquarters: Bristol, Virginia
- Key people: Nininger Family, Owners
- Products: Radio
- Website: www.bristolbroadcasting.com

"Bristol Broadcasting Company" is a radio station chain operating 29 stations in four Southern United States markets: the Tri-Cities area of upper-east Tennessee and southwest Virginia (receiving its name from the twin cities of Bristol, Virginia, and Bristol, Tennessee), Marion, Virginia; Paducah, Kentucky; and Charleston, West Virginia.

In each market it operates a country music station with a rabbit mascot and the slogan "24 carrot country", a Top 40/CHR station under the title "Electric" or "Hot, and every News/Talk station carries the name "Super Talk".

== Stations owned by Bristol Broadcasting ==
=== Tri-Cities ===
- WAEZ
- WEXX
- WFHG-FM
- WLNQ
- WNPC
- WWTB
- WXBQ-FM

=== Marion ===
- WHNK
- WMEV-FM
- WOLD-FM
- WUKZ
- WZVA

=== Charleston ===
- WEMM-FM
- WQBE-FM
- WVSR-FM
- WBES
- WVTS
- WYNL
- WNRJ

=== Paducah / Mayfield ===
- WBMP
- WDXR
- WDDJ
- WKYQ
- WKYX-FM
- WLLE
- WNGO
- WPAD
- WZYK

=== Sevierville ===
- WSEV

== Recent acquisitions ==
August 2016, Bristol acquired Marion, Virginia-based stations WUKZ, W266BM and WMEV-FM.
