= WNVA =

WNVA may refer to:

- WNVA (AM), a radio station (1350 AM) licensed to Norton, Virginia, United States
- WQSN, a radio station (106.3 FM) licensed to Norton, Virginia, which held the call sign WNVA-FM from 1955 to 2017
