= WSEV =

WSEV may refer to:

- WSEV (AM), a radio station (930 AM) licensed to Sevierville, Tennessee, United States
- WSEV-FM, a radio station (105.5 FM) licensed to Gatlinburg, Tennessee, United States
