= WFHG =

WFHG may refer to:

- WFHG-FM, a radio station (92.9 FM) licensed to Bluff City, Tennessee, United States
- WWTB, a radio station (980 AM) licensed to Bristol, Virginia, United States, which held the WFHG call sign from 1947 to 1992 and from 2001 to 2017
