= WMEV =

WMEV may refer to:

- WMEV-FM, a radio station (93.9 FM) licensed to serve Marion, Virginia, United States
- WUKZ, a radio station (1010 AM) licensed to serve Marion, Virginia, which held the call sign WMEV until 2010
- WKPZ-CD, a low-power television station (channel 19) licensed to serve Kingsport, Tennessee, United States, which held the call sign WMEV-LP from 1999 to 2010
