= WSMQ =

WSMQ may refer to:

- WQSN, a radio station (106.3 FM) licensed to serve Norton, Virginia, United States, which held the call sign WSMQ in 2017
- WZGX, a radio station (1450 AM) licensed to serve Bessemer, Alabama, United States, which held the call sign WSMQ from 1980 to 2004
