= WBMP =

WBMP may refer to:

- Wireless Application Protocol Bitmap Format, a graphics file format
- WBMP (AM), a radio station (570 AM) licensed to serve Paducah, Kentucky, United States
- WINS-FM, a radio station (92.3 FM) licensed to New York City, United States, known as WBMP from 2014 to 2018
