= WOLD-FM =

Radio station in Marion, Virginia

- Marion, Virginia; United States
- Broadcast area: Southwest Virginia
- Frequency: 102.5 MHz
- Branding: 102.5 WOLD

Programming
- Format: Classic rock
- Affiliations: Virginia Tech IMG Sports Network

Ownership
- Owner: Bristol Broadcasting Company, Inc.
- Sister stations: WHNK, WMEV-FM, WUKZ, WZVA

History
- First air date: March 14, 1968
- Call sign meaning: Old

Technical information
- Licensing authority: FCC
- Facility ID: 19477
- Class: A
- ERP: 440 watts
- HAAT: 367 meters (1,204 ft)
- Transmitter coordinates: 36°54′10.0″N 81°32′17.0″W

Links
- Public license information: Public file; LMS

WOLD-FM (102.5 FM) is an American radio station licensed to serve the community of Marion, Virginia. The station broadcasts a classic rock music format to Southwest Virginia. WOLD-FM is owned and operated by Bristol Broadcasting Company, Inc.

== History ==
Logo used under the station's former "Renegade" branding.

WOLD-FM signed on in 1968 as a sister station to WOLD (1330 AM). The AM station is now licensed as WHNK and owned by Praise and Glory Ministries based in Knoxville, Tennessee.

In November 2007, longtime license holder Emerald Sound, Inc., reached an agreement with TECO Broadcasting, Inc., to transfer the broadcast license for WOLD-FM plus all of the station's assets for a published sale price of $400,000. In addition, TECO Broadcasting agreed to pay Emerald Sound owners Robert S. Dix and Patricia A. Dix $100,000 as "non-compete" compensation. TECO Broadcasting is wholly owned by Tom Copenhaver, licensee for WZVA. The deal was accepted for filing by the FCC on January 30, 2008, approved on April 10, 2008, and the transaction consummated on May 1, 2008.

In September 2010, the station's format shifted from pure classic rock to classic rock plus some country music, branded as "The Renegade, rock with a twang".

In 2016, the station and then-sister station WZVA were purchased by CDM Broadcasting, Inc. However, effective January 31, 2018, both stations were sold back to T.E.C.O. Broadcasting in exchange for releasing CDM Broadcasting from the $651,039 promissory note related to the 2016 purchase.

Effective February 19, 2019, T.E.C.O. Broadcasting sold WOLD-FM to Bristol Broadcasting Company, Inc. for $165,000.

== Programming ==
WOLD-FM broadcasts a classic rock format to the greater Marion/Saltville/Tazewell, Virginia, area. Weekday programming includes The John Boy and Billy Big Show (from Premiere Radio Networks) in the mornings, The Rick and Bubba Show afternoons and Nights with Alice Cooper (from United Stations Radio Networks) in late night. Weekend programming includes The Tim White Bluegrass Show and Virginia Tech Hokies sports broadcasts.

== In popular culture ==
For his 1973 album Short Stories, singer Harry Chapin wrote a song about an aging disc jockey who begins and ends his career at (fictional) FM radio station "WOLD" after stops as a late night talk show host at an unnamed station in Tulsa, Oklahoma and another stop at another unnamed station in Boise, Idaho. The song, "W*O*L*D", would prove more popular with disc jockeys who could identify with the song than the general public, although it did reach #36 on the Billboard Hot 100 and became an international hit in March 1974, almost exactly six years after the real WOLD-FM signed on in Virginia.
