= WCBF =

WCBF may refer to:

- WCBF (FM), a radio station (96.1 FM) in Elmira, New York
- WLLE, a radio station (102.1 FM) in Mayfield, Kentucky, which held the call sign WCBF from 1997 to 2002
- WJBR (AM) (1010 AM), a radio station in Seffner, Florida, which held the call sign WCBF from 1981 to 1988
