= WIAR =

WIAR may refer to:

- WIAR-LP, a low-power radio station (100.5 FM) licensed to Hilton Head Island, South Carolina, United States
- WIAR (Kentucky), a defunct radio station located in Paducah, Kentucky, United States that was licensed from 1922-1924

== See also ==
- Wiar, a river in Poland and Ukraine
