= WBMP (AM) =

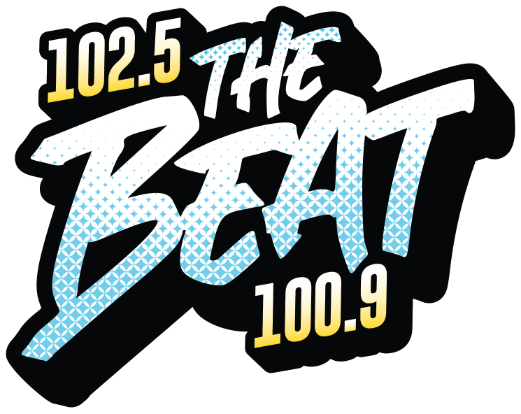
- Paducah, Kentucky; United States
- Frequency: 570 kHz
- Branding: 102.5–100.9 The Beat

Programming
- Format: Urban contemporary
- Affiliations: Compass Media Networks

Ownership
- Owner: Bristol Broadcasting Company, Inc.
- Sister stations: WDDJ, WDXR, WKYQ, WKYX-FM, WLLE, WNGO, WPAD, WZYK

History
- First air date: November 27, 1946; 79 years ago
- Former call signs: WKYB (1946–1964); WKYX (1964–2023)

Technical information
- Licensing authority: FCC
- Facility ID: 6874
- Class: B
- Power: 1,000 watts day; 500 watts night
- Transmitter coordinates: 37°0′53″N 88°36′46″W
- Translators: 100.9 W265DZ (Mayfield); 102.5 W273CH (Paducah)

Links
- Public license information: Public file; LMS
- Webcast: Listen Live
- Website: paducahsbeat.com

WBMP (570 AM) is a radio station broadcasting an urban contemporary format. WBMP is licensed to Paducah, Kentucky, United States. The station is owned by Bristol Broadcasting Company, Inc. and features programming from Compass Media Networks.

== History ==
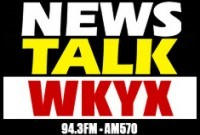
WKYX AM 570 & FM 94.3 former logo

The station signed on November 27, 1946, as WKYB, a daytime-only station operating at 800 kHz; its first license was issued on January 16, 1947. The station was owned by the Paducah Sun-Democrat; this marked the newspaper's return to broadcasting, as it operated WIAR in the 1920s. On January 19, 1951, WKYB moved to 570 kHz; this allowed it to operate at night. Paducah Newspapers sold WKYB to Bruce Barrington, owner of WEW in St. Louis, in 1957; the sale came as the company prepared to launch television station WPSD-TV.

WKYB, along with WKYB-FM 93.3, was sold to Arthur C. Shofield for $140,000 in 1962. The call sign was changed to WKYX on September 18, 1964. In May 1965, Shofield was fined $250 by the Federal Communications Commission (FCC) for allowing Nationwide Stations to operate the station from 1962 to 1964 without FCC approval, and for not reporting a sale of 20 percent of the station to Raymond F. Damgen. Later that year, the station was transferred to KICKS of Kentucky; Shofield retained 40 percent of the new company, with George G. Beasley, William R. Britt, and WKYX manager James E. Harrelson each acquiring 20 percent stakes. W. L. Nininger and C. Edward Wright, owners of WFHG in Bristol, Virginia; WKOY in Bluefield, West Virginia; and WKAZ in Charleston, West Virginia, bought WKYX for $200,000 in 1971.

On December 26, 2022, WKYX and translator W265DZ 100.9 FM split from a news/talk simulcast with sister stations WKYX-FM and WNGO and changed their format to urban contemporary, branded as "102.5/100.9 The Beat". WKYX also changed its call sign to WBMP on January 30, 2023.
