= WAEZ =

- Greeneville, Tennessee; United States
- Broadcast area: Tri-Cities
- Frequency: 94.9 MHz
- Branding: Electric 94.9

Programming
- Format: Mainstream Top 40
- Affiliations: Premiere Networks

Ownership
- Owner: Bristol Broadcasting Company
- Sister stations: WEXX, WFHG-FM, WLNQ, WNPC, WWTB, WXBQ-FM

History
- Former call signs: WGRV-FM (1956–1966); WOFM (1966–1982); WOKM (09/27/1982) WIKQ (09/27/1982–07/31/2000) WPJO (07/31/2000– 08/07/2000)

Technical information
- Licensing authority: FCC
- Facility ID: 54601
- Class: C0
- ERP: 100,000 watts horizontal 87,000 watts vertical
- HAAT: 332 meters (1,089 ft)
- Transmitter coordinates: 36°04′34.00″N 82°41′28.00″W
- Translator: 95.3 W237DV (Kingsport)

Links
- Public license information: Public file; LMS
- Webcast: Listen Live
- Website: www.electric949.com

WAEZ (94.9 FM) is a United States Mainstream Top 40 radio station serving the Tri-Cities TN-VA Metropolitan Statistical Area with an ERP of 100,000 watts. It is licensed to Greeneville, Tennessee. The station started out as a Top 40 station until 2004, when the station went with a Hot AC format, but due to lower ratings, the station reverted to the Top 40 format in early 2006. WAEZ is owned by Bristol Broadcasting Company, along with "twin stations" WVSR-FM (Electric 102.7) in Charleston, West Virginia, and WDDJ-FM (Electric 96.9) in Paducah, Kentucky. The station targets active young adult females ages 18 to 34, according to Bristol Broadcasting.

== History ==
On January 4, 1956, the Federal Communications Commission granted a construction permit to Radio Greeneville, Inc., to build a new FM radio station in Greeneville. The station was on the air by July. It changed its call sign to WOFM on June 9, 1966. The station was airing a country music format by 1979. The call letters changed to WIKQ in 1982, and by 1985 the station was airing an adult contemporary format, utilizing a format from the Satellite Music Network. However, it was far behind WTFM, its direct format competitor, in the ratings.

The WAEZ format and call sign moved from 99.3 MHz in 2000. The WIKQ call sign moved to 103.1 MHz in Tusculum.

In 2011, Bristol Broadcasting purchased a translator (W237DV), which it uses to rebroadcast WAEZ on 95.3 in Kingsport, Tennessee. Previously, WAEZ dealt with many (terrain) issues getting the main signal into parts of Kingsport.
