= WQBE-FM =

- Charleston, West Virginia; United States
- Broadcast area: Charleston MSA
- Frequency: 97.5 MHz
- Branding: 97.5 WQBE

Programming
- Format: Country

Ownership
- Owner: Bristol Broadcasting Company
- Sister stations: WBES, WEMM-FM, WNRJ, WVSR-FM, WVTS, WYNL

History
- First air date: July 6, 1948

Technical information
- Licensing authority: FCC
- Facility ID: 6875
- Class: B
- ERP: 50,000 watts
- HAAT: 152 meters
- Transmitter coordinates: 38°24′22.0″N 81°43′26.0″W

Links
- Public license information: Public file; LMS
- Website: wqbe.com

WQBE-FM (97.5 MHz) is one of three Charleston, West Virginia Country FM radio stations. WQBE is owned by Bristol Broadcasting Company of Bristol, Virginia, with a "twin" radio station WXBQ-FM in that area. WQBE also has another "twin" station WKYQ-FM in Paducah, Kentucky also owned by Bristol Broadcasting. WQBE broadcasts with an ERP of 50,000 watts. According to Bristol Broadcasting Company's website, WQBE's listening audience is strong in the 18 to 49 (male and female), and 25 to 54 (male and female) demographic ranges.

== History ==
The station was established as WKNA-FM on July 6, 1948. The call sign was changed to WKAZ-FM on August 5, 1957. The station was bought by the Bristol Broadcasting Company on September 21, 1971. The call sign was changed again to WQBE-FM on November 11, 1974, according to FCC microfiche files. On October 14, 1983, WKAZ/950 ended its own format and identity and assumed a simulcast of the WQBE-FM signal and thus became WQBE (AM).
