= WZJO =

WZJO may refer to:

- WZJO-LP, a low-power radio station (90.9 FM) licensed to serve Columbia, South Carolina, United States
- WYNL, a radio station (94.5 FM) licensed to serve Dunbar, West Virginia, United States, which held the call sign WZJO from 2001 to 2010
