= WEXX =

Radio station in Elizabethton/Tri-Cities, Tennessee

Coordinates: 36.402°N 82.203°W

- Elizabethton, Tennessee; United States
- Broadcast area: Tri-Cities
- Frequency: 99.3 MHz
- Branding: 99.3 The X

Programming
- Format: Alternative rock
- Affiliations: Compass Media Networks

Ownership
- Owner: Bristol Broadcasting Company
- Sister stations: WAEZ; WFHG-FM; WLNQ; WNPC; WWTB; WXBQ-FM

History
- First air date: 1968
- Former call signs: WUSJ (1/1986–3/1986); WUSJ-FM (1986–1994); WAEZ (1994–2000); WPJO (2000–2003); WTZR (2003–2015)
- Call sign meaning: The X

Technical information
- Licensing authority: FCC
- Facility ID: 18036
- Class: C3
- ERP: 4,400 watts
- HAAT: 243.8 meters (800 ft)
- Translator: 106.1 W291AP (Kingsport)

Links
- Public license information: Public file; LMS
- Webcast: Listen LIve
- Website: 993thex.com

WEXX (99.3 FM) is located in the Tri-Cities, Tennessee area and is owned by Bristol Broadcasting Company. Known as "99.3 The X", it is an alternative rock music station with the slogan "Tri-Cities New Alternative".

== History ==
In the late '80s and into the '90s, the 99.3 frequency was country music-formatted WUSJ-FM "US99". In January 1997, the station found popularity as "Electric 99.3", a top 40 music station. In 2000, a format swap sent the "Electric" branding and format to 94.9 WAEZ, where it still is today. 99.3 then became an adult contemporary station, known as "MIX 99.3" until 2001. The station then flipped to rhythmic oldies as WPJO-FM, a format that lasted until 2003, when the current format took over.

Most recently, Mediabase has moved the station to the active rock panel, under the callsign WTZR (Z-Rock), but the default active rock station is WRZK. The station continued to report on the alternative rock panel per Nielsen BDS. It was currently one of two alternative rock stations on Mediabase's active rock panel, the other being KFRR, but this changed in March 2012, when WTZR became the only alternative rock station on the Mediabase active rock panel; KFRR is now once again on Mediabase's alternative rock panel. By April 2012, WTZR flipped to active rock as it was moved to the BDS active rock panel.

On February 21, 2015, WTZR changed their format from active rock back to alternative rock, branded as "99.3 The X". On February 23, 2015, WTZR changed its call letters to WEXX, to go with "The X" branding.

== Programming ==
=== Weekdays ===
- Mornings With Jay 6 AM-10 AM
- Chris 10 AM-3 PM
- Maxx 3 PM-8 PM
