= WDDJ =

- Paducah, Kentucky; United States
- Frequency: 96.9 MHz
- Branding: Electric 96.9

Programming
- Format: Top 40 (CHR)

Ownership
- Owner: Bristol Broadcasting Company
- Sister stations: WBMP, WDXR, WKYQ, WKYX-FM, WLLE, WNGO, WPAD, WZYK

History
- Former call signs: WPAD-FM (1978–1980)

Technical information
- Licensing authority: FCC
- Facility ID: 54719
- Class: C1
- ERP: 100,000 watts
- HAAT: 237 meters
- Transmitter coordinates: 37°02′56″N 88°36′52″W

Links
- Public license information: Public file; LMS
- Website: electric969.com

WDDJ (96.9 FM) is a radio station licensed to serve Paducah, Kentucky, United States. The station is owned by Bristol Broadcasting Company along with "twin stations" "Electric 94.9" in Tri-Cities, Tennessee/Virginia, and "Electric 102.7" in Charleston, West Virginia. WDDJ broadcasts a Top 40 (CHR) music format.

== History ==
The station was assigned the call sign WPAD-FM on October 18, 1978. On March 1, 1980, the station changed its call sign to the current WDDJ.

== Current line-up ==
As of June 2018 the on-air line-up for Electric 96.9 is as follows:

=== Weekdays ===
- The Electric Morning Show AJ & Courtney 6a-10a
- Mark Summer 10a-3p
- Carl P 3p-7p
- 7p-Midnight

=== Weekends ===
- There is a rotating live air staff on hand from 10a-6p.
- Syndicated weekend programming includes; Open House Party, Sonrise with Kevin Peterson, and Dawson McAllister Live
