= WPAD =

- Paducah, Kentucky; United States
- Frequency: 1560 kHz
- Branding: 99.5 The Fan

Programming
- Format: Sports
- Affiliations: Fox Sports Radio

Ownership
- Owner: Bristol Broadcasting Company, Inc.
- Sister stations: WBMP, WDDJ, WDXR, WKYQ, WKYX-FM, WLLE, WNGO, WZYK

History
- First air date: August 23, 1930
- Call sign meaning: Paducah

Technical information
- Licensing authority: FCC
- Facility ID: 54720
- Class: D
- Power: 1,000 watts (day); 35 watts (night)
- Transmitter coordinates: 37°03′08″N 88°36′03″W
- Translators: 99.5 W258AN (Paducah); 101.7 W269DO (Paducah)

Links
- Public license information: Public file; LMS
- Webcast: Listen live
- Website: 995thefanpaducah.com

WPAD (1560 AM) is a radio station broadcasting a sports format. Licensed to Paducah, Kentucky, United States. The station is owned by the Bristol Broadcasting Company, Inc.

== History ==
=== Early years ===
WPAD is the fifth oldest radio broadcasting station in Kentucky, founded in 1930 by Pierce Lackey, with its inaugural broadcast taking place on August 23, billed as "The Voice of Western Kentucky." The opening of this station marked the return of radio in Paducah after the shutdown of the short-lived WIAR, which operated from 1922 until 1924.

WPAD initially broadcast on 1420 kHz with a 100 watt signal.

=== Ohio River Flood of 1937 ===
WPAD was one of several radio stations that was impacted by the infamous Ohio River flood of 1937; the station was temporarily relocated to a garage in Avondale Heights in order to remain of the air.

=== Power increases and CBS affiliation ===
In 1941, the power was increased to 250 watts, and the frequency was changed to 1450 kHz. In 1943, the station joined the CBS radio network. In 1946, WPAD-FM (now WDDJ) was established as the first FM broadcasting station in the state, continuing with FM simulcast of the AM until the 1970s. In 1962, the power was increased to 1,000 watts.

=== Ownership changes ===
In 1967, Lackey died and the station was purchased by Union City, Tennessee, businessman Ed Fritts and his wife, Ruth, for a price of $158,000. In the 1970s, the FM call letters were changed to WDDJ and the FM programming was changed to progressive rock.

In 1984, the stations were sold to Bill Bereman of Indianapolis, who would later sell the station to Purchase Broadcasting (presided by Lee Hagan) in 1991. In 1996, the stations were purchased by Bristol Broadcasting, owner of WKYX and WKYQ. WPAD exchanged frequencies with WDXR, and continued to operate on 1560 kHz with an "oldies" format.

=== Recent developments ===
On October 22, 2014, WPAD was granted a Federal Communications Commission construction permit to decrease day power to 1,000 watts and decrease night power to 35 watts. The license to cover for the new facility was granted on April 28, 2017.

== Programming ==
WPAD carries play-by-play from the Nashville Predators Radio Network and the Tennessee Titans Radio Network.
