= Vivian Wilson Henderson =

American educator (1923–1976)

Vivian Henderson
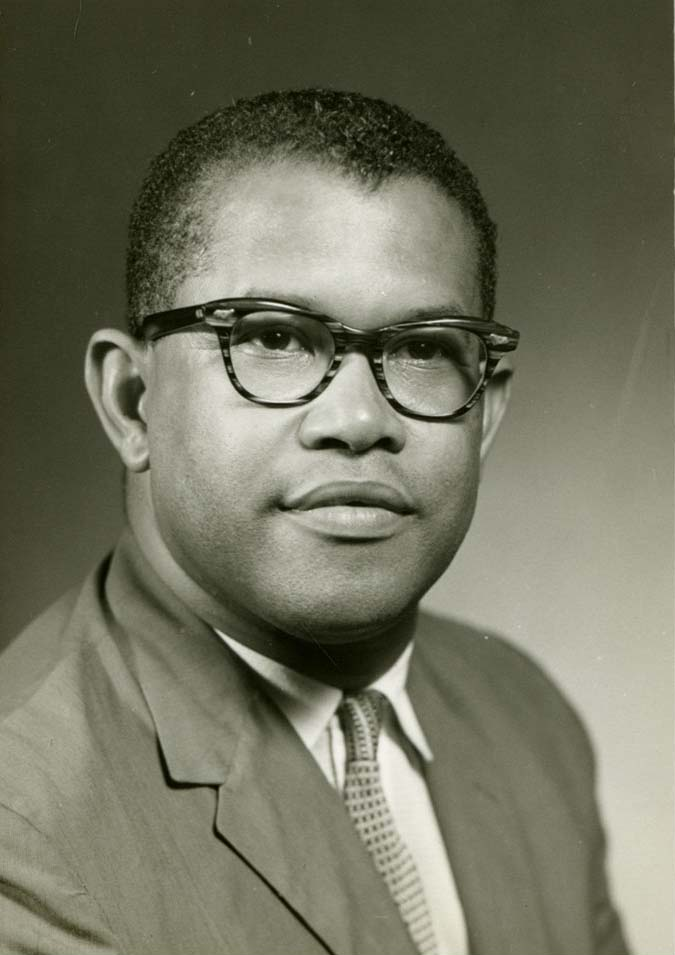
- Born: February 10, 1923; Bristol, Tennessee, U.S.
- Died: January 28, 1976 (aged 52); Atlanta, Georgia, U.S.
- Occupations: Human Rights Activist, Educator
- Spouse: Anna Powell Henderson
- Children: Wyonella Marie Henderson; Dwight Cedric Henderson, David Wayne Henderson; Kimberly Ann Henderson

Vivian Wilson Henderson (February 10, 1923 – January 28, 1976) was an American educator and human rights activist, and the eighth president of Clark Atlanta University. Vivian Wilson Henderson became President of Clark College in 1963, at the age of 40, where he would serve as president for 10 consecutive years.

== Education ==
Vivian Wilson Henderson was born on February 10, 1923, in Bristol, Tennessee. He attended Slater High School. He then attended North Carolina Central University in Durham from 1940 to 1943. During World War II, Henderson served as sergeant in the United States Army. He resumed his college education after the war, and he earned a Masters of Business Administration in 1947. He soon proceeded to Iowa State University where he received his master's degree and doctorate in economics by 1952.

== Career ==
Henderson became an instructor at Prairie View A&M University in Texas from 1948 to 1949. He also was an instructor at his alma mater North Carolina Central University from 1949 to 1950. He then became a professor and chairman of the economics department at Fisk University in Nashville, Tennessee from 1958 to 1963. He served as the eighteenth President of Clark College from 1965 to 1976.

=== Activism ===
Henderson distributed various deals with the financial energy of the dark group. Henderson played a dynamic part in the social equality development as a coordinator of the U.S. Commission on Civil Rights, chief of the Voter Education Project, and administrator of the Southern Regional Council's official panel. In 1971, Governor Jimmy Carter chose Henderson as co-administrator of the Georgia Goals Commission to get ready for Carter's redesign of Georgia state government.

=== Research ===
In 1960, Henderson published a report about the working conditions of blacks in Nashville, Tennessee. He concluded that 80% of blacks worked in "menial, unskilled positions" while the remaining 20% who worked in professional jobs did so in segregated (black-only) companies.

From 1962 to 1964 he was a meeting researcher of financial matters at North Carolina State University in Raleigh. Henderson wrote various works including The Economic Imbalance, Economic Dimensions in Race Relations, Economic Opportunity and Negro Education, The Economic Status of Negroes, The Advancing South, Employment Race and Poverty, and Negro Colleges Face the Future. Henderson was engaged with various urban, group, and social equality associations and was very looked for after to serve on nearby, state, local, national, and global government and corporate councils, commissions, teams, and sheets.

=== Civic activities ===
His memberships included the boards of directors of the National Sharecroppers Fund; Potomac Institute; Fulton County Equal Employment Opportunities Committee and the General Board of Christian Social Concerns of the Methodist Church. He also served as a member of the National Manpower Advisory Committee and the National Advisory Committee for Project Upward Bound. He also served as chairman of the Georgia Advisory Committee to the U.S. Commission of Civil Rights and was a member of the U.S. National Commission to UNESCO from 1969 to 1972, serving on education and human rights committees.

Henderson was a member of the Board of Trustees of the Ford Foundation and was president and chairman of the executive committee of the Southern Regional Council. He was also a director of the National Urban Coalition; National Bureau of Economic Research; Common Cause; Atlanta Chamber of Commerce; Martin Luther King Center for Social Change; and was a trustee of American University. He was co-chairman of the Interstate Committee on Human Resources and Public Services of the Southern Growth Policies Board, and was chairman of the Atlanta Regional Commission Health Manpower Task Force.

Henderson was a founding member of the Black Academy of Arts and Sciences and was a fellow in the American Academy of Arts and Sciences. Henderson was a life member of the National Association for the Advancement of Colored People and was a director of the Voter Education Project. Other directorships included the Atlanta Urban League; Atlanta Community Chest; Atlanta chapter of the National Conference of Christians and Jews; and Atlanta Civil Liberties Union.

Henderson served as co-chairman of Atlanta Mayor Maynard Jackson's Reorganization Task Force in 1973, and as education co-chairman of then Governor Jimmy Carter's Goals for Georgia Progress. He participated in President Gerald Ford's White House Conference on Inflation in 1974.

Henderson received the Medal for Distinguished Service from Columbia University in 1970, and was the recipient of the W.E.B. DuBois Award of the Association of Social and Behavioral Scientists in 1974.

== Death ==
Henderson died on January 28, 1976, in Atlanta, Georgia, at age 52.
