= WXBQ-FM =

Radio station in Bristol, Virginia

- Bristol, Virginia; United States
- Broadcast area: Tri-Cities
- Frequency: 96.9 MHz
- Branding: 96.9 WXBQ

Programming
- Format: Country
- Affiliations: Fox News Radio; Motor Racing Network

Ownership
- Owner: Bristol Broadcasting Company, Inc.
- Sister stations: WAEZ, WEXX, WWTB, WFHG-FM, WLNQ, WNPC

History
- First air date: December 25, 1946
- Former call signs: WOPI-FM (1946–1972); WKYE-FM (1972–1975); WFHG-FM (1975–1978)

Technical information
- Licensing authority: FCC
- Facility ID: 6876
- Class: C
- ERP: 75,000 watts
- HAAT: 683 meters (2,241 ft)
- Transmitter coordinates: 36°25′59.3″N 82°8′10.4″W

Links
- Public license information: Public file; LMS
- Webcast: Listen live
- Website: www.wxbq.com

WXBQ-FM is a Country formatted broadcast radio station licensed to Bristol, Virginia, serving the Tri-Cities. WXBQ-FM is owned and operated by Bristol Broadcasting Company, Inc.

== History ==
WOPI-FM, sister to 1490 WOPI, signed on Christmas Day 1946 from atop Whitetop Mountain, a facility described at the time as "the largest frequency modulation station in the South". After 10 days using a temporary antenna, the station went on air with its regular 10 kW power on January 4, 1947. Building on Whitetop, Virginia's second-tallest mountain, meant bringing power lines six miles to the site and constructing a tower in high winds. When winter weather set in, as it did that February, staff were marooned atop the mountain. WOPI-FM simulcast most of WOPI's NBC and local output and had exclusive coverage of many sporting events.

In 1951, WOPI-FM moved off the mountain and to the AM transmitter tower off Old Abingdon Road in Bristol, Virginia. The temporary facility was replaced by a new site in 1954 on the edge of town. Along with WOPI AM, WOPI-FM was sold to W. A. Wilson in 1954, the Pioneer Broadcasting Company in 1959, and the Tri-Cities Broadcasting Company in 1965.

The station was sold twice to different radio partners. In 1972, the Highland Development Corporation of Bristol, owners of 1550 WKYE, acquired 96.9 and renamed it WKYE-FM. The station became WFHG-FM in 1975 upon acquisition by the Bristol Broadcasting Company and adopted its present WXBQ-FM call letters in 1978. The call letters were chosen randomly but to avoid confusion with the AM outlet; by this time, WXBQ-FM had already gone country.

Kenny Chesney credits WXBQ and its longtime program director Bill Hagy for helping start his career; Chesney attended nearby East Tennessee State University in Johnson City.
