= WPFT =

- Pigeon Forge, Tennessee; United States
- Broadcast area: Knoxville, Tennessee
- Frequency: 106.3 MHz
- Branding: Talk 106.3

Programming
- Format: Conservative talk
- Affiliations: Fox News Radio; Premiere Networks

Ownership
- Owner: East Tennessee Radio Group, L.P.
- Sister stations: WSEV-FM

History
- First air date: 2007
- Call sign meaning: Welcome to Pigeon Forge, Tennessee

Technical information
- Licensing authority: FCC
- Facility ID: 170936
- Class: A
- ERP: 500 watts
- HAAT: 340 meters
- Transmitter coordinates: 35°42′13″N 83°33′57″W

Links
- Public license information: Public file; LMS
- Webcast: Listen live
- Website: talk1063.com

WPFT (106.3 FM) is a conservative talk radio station licensed to Pigeon Forge, Tennessee. Owned by East Tennessee Radio Group, L.P., WPFT serves the Knoxville, Tennessee area.

== History ==
"106.3 the Mountain" dropped classic hits late in 2009 for sports talk. On September 29, 2014, the station dropped ESPN Radio for a locally programmed country music format, with an emphasis on music from the 1970s through the 2000s and local news.

In January 2018, they added long-time East Tennessee radio personality, Mike Howard to the line-up with the "Mike in the Morning" radio show. The station has since moved from country to a classic hits format.

On August 7, 2025, WPFT changed their format from regional Mexican (as "Que Buena 106.3") to conservative talk, branded as "Talk 106.3".

== Former logo ==
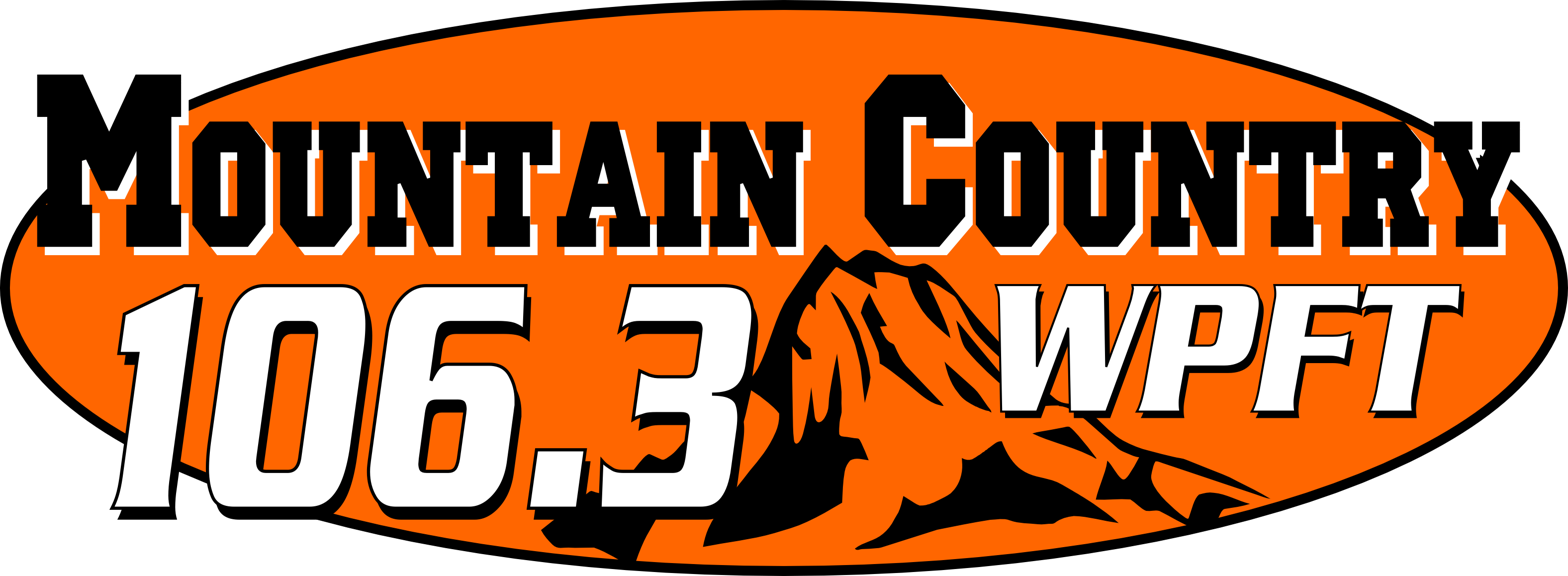
