= WNVA (AM) =

- Norton, Virginia; United States
- Broadcast area: Big Stone Gap, Virginia; Wise County, Virginia
- Frequency: 1350 kHz
- Branding: ESPN Radio 1350

Programming
- Format: Sports
- Affiliations: ESPN Radio; MRN Radio; PRN Radio

Ownership
- Owner: Bristol Broadcasting Company, Inc.
- Sister stations: WQSN

History
- First air date: March 1946
- Former frequencies: 1450 kHz (1946–1954); 1050 kHz (1954–1956)
- Call sign meaning: Norton, Virginia

Technical information
- Licensing authority: FCC
- Facility ID: 54895
- Class: D
- Power: 5,000 watts (day); 37 watts (night)
- Transmitter coordinates: 36°56′31.0″N 82°35′48.0″W
- Translator: 107.9 W300DS (Norton)

Links
- Public license information: Public file; LMS

WNVA (1350 AM) is a sports formatted broadcast radio station licensed to Norton, Virginia, serving Big Stone Gap and Wise County in Virginia. WNVA is owned and operated by Bristol Broadcasting Company, Inc.

== History ==
On July 20, 2007, Radio-Wise, Inc. received a $4,000 fine from the Federal Communications Commission (FCC) for not keeping all required documentation in WNVA's public file.

In the early part of 2012, WNVA dropped their Classic Country for Sports with programming from ESPN Radio.

Radio-Wise sold WNVA and sister station WNVA-FM to Bristol Broadcasting Company for $35,000, enough to settle property tax debts and outstanding FCC fines; the sale closed on January 16, 2015.

On April 5, 2016, WNVA was granted a Federal Communications Commission construction permit to move to a new transmitter site. Instead of using a conventional steel vertical radiator used by most stations it would use an 85-foot whip antenna. The steel vertical radiator currently in use is 360 feet.
