= WVSR-FM =

- Charleston, West Virginia; United States
- Broadcast area: Charleston metropolitan area
- Frequency: 102.7 MHz
- Branding: Electric 102-7

Programming
- Language: English
- Format: Contemporary hit radio
- Affiliations: Premiere Networks

Ownership
- Owner: Bristol Broadcasting Company; (Bristol Broadcasting Company, Inc.)
- Sister stations: WBES; WEMM-FM; WNRJ; WQBE-FM; WVTS; WYNL

History
- First air date: September 1964
- Former call signs: WTIO (1964–1982)
- Call sign meaning: "West Virginia's Super Radio" (former branding)

Technical information
- Licensing authority: FCC
- Facility ID: 2684
- Class: B
- ERP: 50,000 watts
- HAAT: 123 meters (404 ft)
- Transmitter coordinates: 38°21′26.0″N 81°40′5.0″W

Links
- Public license information: Public file; LMS
- Webcast: Listen live
- Website: electric102.com

WVSR-FM (102.7 MHz) is a commercial FM contemporary hit radio station serving the Charleston metropolitan area with an ERP of 50,000 watts. WVSR is owned by Bristol, Virginia-based Bristol Broadcasting Company, along with "twin stations" "Electric 94.9" in Greeneville, Tennessee, and "Electric 96-9" in Paducah, Kentucky. The station targets active young adult females ages 18 to 34, according to Bristol Broadcasting. WVSR can deal with a tremendous amount of interference in the Flatwoods, West Virginia, area from co-channel 102.7 The Torch, which broadcasts out of Mannington, West Virginia.

== History ==
102.7 FM started life as WTIO-FM in September 1964, launching with a beautiful music format. As contemporary hits moved to FM during the early-1980s, WTIO dropped its call-letters and the easy listening format altogether and flipped to CHR in September 1982, as the dominant Top 40 station in Charleston under the callsign WVSR. Starting its CHR life as "Super 102", the station quickly became Charleston's hit music leader and went to #1 in the ratings book in 1986. Beasley Broadcast Group operated the station during its early CHR days until Beasley sold to Ardman Broadcasting in December 1986.

At least eight of the Beasley Broadcast Group people moved to Charlotte when Beasley Broadcast bought a station in that market. WVSR's CHR powerhouse as "Super 102" lasted until 2004, when the station downgraded its CHR format and went straight with a hot AC format. This completely failed because of low ratings, and the station immediately reverted to its CHR format in early 2006, as "Electric 102".
