= WQSN =

- Norton, Virginia; United States
- Broadcast area: Big Stone Gap, Virginia; Pennington Gap, Virginia; Clintwood, Virginia; Whitesburg, Kentucky; Cumberland, Kentucky; Jenkins, Kentucky; Kingsport, Tennessee
- Frequency: 106.3 MHz

Programming
- Format: Classic hits

Ownership
- Owner: Bristol Broadcasting Company, Inc.
- Sister stations: WNVA

History
- First air date: July 25, 1969
- Former call signs: WNVA-FM (1969–2017); WSMQ (2017–2017)

Technical information
- Licensing authority: FCC
- Facility ID: 54886
- Class: A
- ERP: 157 watts
- HAAT: 587 meters (1,926 ft)
- Transmitter coordinates: 36°53′53.0″N 82°37′21.0″W

Links
- Public license information: Public file; LMS

WQSN is a classic hits formatted broadcast radio station licensed to Norton, Virginia, serving Big Stone Gap, Pennington Gap, and Clintwood in Virginia, Whitesburg, Cumberland, and Jenkins in Kentucky, and Kingsport in Tennessee. WQSN is owned and operated by Bristol Broadcasting Company, Inc.

== History ==
Originally WNVA-FM, the station first launched on July 25, 1969. WNVA went on the air, on the AM side, on March 6, 1946, with a broadcasting power of 250 watts. WNVA was first owned and operated by the Blan Fox Radio Company and was affiliated with Mutual Broadcasting System, but has always remained under the same ownership since its conception in 1946.

On December 28, 2008, WNVA-FM changed its format from the Jones Radio Network's Hot AC to the New Dial Global's Classic Hit Country.

On July 15, 2010 at midnight, WNVA-FM changed its format from Dial Global's Classic Hit Country to Citadel Media's Hits & Favorites network. WNVA-FM fell silent in August 2014.

Radio-Wise Inc. sold WNVA-FM and sister station WNVA to Bristol Broadcasting Company for $35,000, enough to settle property tax debts and outstanding FCC fines; the sale closed on January 16, 2015.

The station changed its call sign to WSMQ on August 28, 2017, and to WQSN on September 4, 2017.

In late 2025, WQSN dropped it's simulcast of sister-station WEXX and began carrying a commercial free Classic Hits format.
