= WZVA =

- Marion, Virginia; United States
- Broadcast area: Marion, Virginia; Wytheville, Virginia
- Frequency: 103.5 MHz
- Branding: Hot 103.5

Programming
- Format: Top 40/CHR

Ownership
- Owner: Bristol Broadcasting Company; (Bristol Broadcasting Company, Inc.)
- Sister stations: WMEV-FM, WHNK, WUKZ, WOLD-FM

History
- First air date: September 2, 1996
- Call sign meaning: We're the HotteZt in VirginiA!

Technical information
- Licensing authority: FCC
- Facility ID: 30154
- Class: A
- ERP: 3,700 watts
- HAAT: 129 meters (423 ft)
- Transmitter coordinates: 36°54′10.0″N 81°22′56.0″W

Links
- Public license information: Public file; LMS
- Website: 1035hot.com

WZVA is a commercial radio station licensed to Marion, Virginia. Owned by Bristol Broadcasting Company, it broadcasts a contemporary hit radio format targeting Marion and Wytheville.

== History ==
WZVA signed on September 2, 1996,

By 2016, WZVA aired a country music format as Thunder Country 103.5; on August 15, 2016, WZVA and WOLD-FM were sold to CDM Broadcasting, who took the stations over under a time brokerage agreement. At this time, WZVA began stunting with a ticking clock. By September 4, it had begun to air theme songs from television programs. On October 6, 2016, the station relaunched as 103.5 The Bull, maintaining its country format.

Effective January 31, 2018, both WZVA and WOLD-FM were reacquired by previous owner T.E.C.O. Broadcasting, Inc. in exchange for releasing CDM Broadcasting from the $651,039 promissory note arising from the 2016 purchase.

Effective June 20, 2018, WZVA was sold to Bristol Broadcasting Company, who flipped WZVA to contemporary hit radio as Hot 103.5 on June 29, 2018, ceding the country format to new sister station WMEV-FM.
