= G.W. Blackley House =

Coordinates: 36.594441°N 82.175066°W

The G.W. Blackley House is one of the oldest houses in Bristol, Tennessee. It was listed on the Bristol Register of Historic Places in 2010. This federal style house was constructed by noted local furniture builder George W. Blackley at 122 East State Street in 1869.

Blackley was one of the early settlers of Bristol, arriving in the area from Albemarle County, Virginia, around 1855. He was a master carpenter who built homes and made fine furniture for other settlers.

The house stands near historic East Hill Cemetery, where many who took up arms in a war of rebellion against the United States on behalf of the Confederacy are buried, including James Keeling.

The G.W. Blackley house is one of the oldest homes in the town of Bristol and the first home built on East Hill. Historic restoration is planned beginning in 2011–2012. The remaining property consists of 0.30 acres.
