= William H. Neal =

American politician

Member of the Tennessee House of Representatives
- In office 1969–1970

Personal details
- Born: William Henry Neal Jr. February 23, 1915 Bristol, Tennessee, U.S.
- Died: November 30, 1974 (aged 59) Bristol, Tennessee, U.S.
- Party: Republican

William Henry Neal Jr. (February 23, 1915 – November 30, 1974) was an American politician. A member of the Republican Party, he served in the Tennessee House of Representatives from 1969 to 1970.

Neal died at the Bristol Memorial Hospital in Bristol, Tennessee on November 30, 1974, at the age of 59.
