= WHNK (AM) =

Radio station in Marion, Virginia

- Marion, Virginia; United States
- Broadcast area: Marion, Virginia; Smyth County, Virginia
- Frequency: 1330 kHz
- Branding: Praise N' Glory Radio

Programming
- Format: Black gospel

Ownership
- Owner: Bristol Broadcasting Company; (Bristol Broadcasting Company, Inc.)
- Sister stations: WMEV-FM, WUKZ, WZVA, WOLD-FM

History
- First air date: April 25, 1962
- Former call signs: WOLD (1962–2006); WHGB (2006–2007); WITM (2007–2017); WSNQ (2017–2020)

Technical information
- Licensing authority: FCC
- Facility ID: 19478
- Class: D
- Power: 5,000 watts (day); 31 watts (night)
- Transmitter coordinates: 36°49′11.0″N 81°28′12.0″W
- Translator: 92.5 W223DE (Marion)

Links
- Public license information: Public file; LMS

WHNK is a Black Gospel-formatted broadcast radio station licensed to Marion, Virginia, serving Marion and Smyth County, Virginia. WHNK is owned and operated by Bristol Broadcasting Company.

== History ==
=== Tower problems ===
On August 20, 2008, the then-WITM fell silent because the "owner of the land adjacent to the station's temporary tower" asked the station "to remove a guy wire that was on his property". According to the station's Silent STA Application, WITM would "return to the air when the temporary antenna can be repositioned to comply with its current STA".

=== Station donated ===
On August 17, 2009, WITM was donated to Praise and Glory Ministries based in Knoxville, Tennessee. The station, while transferred, remained under the Silent STA Application filed by previous owners Appalachian Educational Communications Corporation, which was extended on July 6, 2009 as it was "determined that the operation of WITM [was] a burden on the Non-Profit Appalachian Educational Communications Corporation". According to a filing with the FCC, the station resumed broadcasting on June 12, 2010.

Effective April 7, 2017, Praise and Glory Ministries sold WITM to Bristol Broadcasting Company for $2,000. The station changed its call sign to WSNQ on August 28, 2017 and again to WHNK on November 20, 2020.
