= WDXR =

- Paducah, Kentucky; United States
- Frequency: 1450 kHz
- Branding: 96.3 DXR

Programming
- Format: Classic hits
- Affiliations: United Stations Radio Networks

Ownership
- Owner: Bristol Broadcasting Company, Inc.
- Sister stations: WBMP, WDDJ, WKYQ, WKYX-FM, WLLE, WNGO, WPAD, WZYK

History
- First air date: December 24, 1957 (on 1560 kHz)
- Former frequencies: 1560 kHz (1957–1979)

Technical information
- Licensing authority: FCC
- Facility ID: 40637
- Class: C
- Power: 250 watts unlimited
- Transmitter coordinates: 37°5′55″N 88°37′19″W
- Translator: 96.3 W242CX (Paducah)

Links
- Public license information: Public file; LMS
- Website: www.bristolbroadcasting.com/paducahmkt.shtml www.1025dxr.com

WDXR (1450 AM), along with FM translator W242CX at 96.3, is a radio station licensed to serve Paducah, Kentucky, United States. The station, established in 1957, is currently owned by Virginia-based Bristol Broadcasting Company, Inc. and airs a classic hits format, supplied via satellite from Cumulus Media.

== History ==
=== The beginning ===
This station began regular operation on December 24, 1957, broadcasting with 1,000 watts of power on a frequency of 1560 kHz. The station was assigned the call sign WDXR by the Federal Communications Commission.

WDXR was originally owned by Earl Weaks McKinney-Smith, serving as both company president as the station's first news director. McKinney-Smith had the FCC transfer the WDXR broadcast license to a new company called WDXR, Inc., which was owned by both E. Weaks McKinney-Smith and his wife, Lady Sarah McKinney-Smith. After E. Weaks McKinney-Smith died in February 1974, control of WDXR, Inc., passed solely to Lady Sarah McKinney-Smith.

=== Move to 1450 ===
In December 1978, WDXR, Inc., reached an agreement to sell this station to Paducah Broadcasters, Inc. The deal, contingent on a simultaneous transaction for WPAD, was approved by the FCC on February 14, 1979. WDXR formerly broadcast on a frequency of 1560 kHz, before exchanging frequencies with WPAD (1450 AM) in February 1979. At the time of the swap, WDXR broadcast a middle of the road music format.

In April 1989, Pollack Communications, Inc., agreed to sell WDXR to Metro Media of Kentucky, Inc. The deal was approved by the FCC on June 30, 1989, and the transaction was consummated on July 11, 1989. This would prove short-lived as Metro Media of Kentucky, Inc., reached an agreement in June 1991 to sell this station to the Mason-Dixon Broadcasting Company. The deal was approved by the FCC on July 19, 1991, and the transaction was consummated on September 5, 1991.

In January 1996, the Mason-Dixon Broadcasting Company contracted to transfer the broadcast license for this station to Hilltopper Broadcasting, Inc. The deal was approved by the FCC on February 28, 1996, and the transaction was consummated on March 19, 1996.

In August 2000, Hilltopper Broadcasting, Inc., announced an agreement to sell WDXR to Forever Communications, Inc., subsidiary WRUS, Inc., as part of a five-station deal valued at a reported $5 million. The deal was approved by the FCC on November 13, 2000, and the transaction was consummated on February 2, 2001. At the time of the sale, WDXR aired a mix of news and ESPN Radio sports talk programming.

=== WDXR today ===
In December 2003, Forever Communications, Inc., reached an agreement to sell this station to Bristol Broadcasting Company, Inc., as part of a five-station deal for a cash price of $3.15 million. The deal was approved by the FCC on February 20, 2004, and the transaction was consummated on March 15, 2004. At the time of the sale, WDXR broadcast a sports radio format. WDXR adopted an urban adult contemporary music format in April 2005.

Bristol Broadcasting Company broke ground on an expansion on its existing radio studio and office complex in May 2008. Company officials cited continuing growth at the nine-station complex as the reason for the new construction.
