= WZYK =

- Clinton, Kentucky; United States
- Broadcast area: Paducah, Kentucky; Purchase area
- Frequency: 94.7 MHz
- Branding: 94.7 The Mix

Programming
- Format: Adult contemporary

Ownership
- Owner: Bristol Broadcasting Company
- Sister stations: WBMP, WDDJ, WDXR, WKYQ, WKYX-FM, WLLE, WNGO, WPAD

History
- First air date: 1955 (as WXID)
- Former call signs: WXID (1955–1997); WBLN (1997–1998); WIVR-FM (1998–1999); WIVR (1999–2000); WLLE (2000–2004); WQQR (2004–2014)

Technical information
- Licensing authority: FCC
- Facility ID: 71613
- Class: C2
- ERP: 50,000 watts
- HAAT: 144 meters
- Transmitter coordinates: 36°45′19.00″N 88°39′36.60″W

Links
- Public license information: Public file; LMS
- Website: 947themix.com

WZYK (94.7 FM) is an adult contemporary–formatted radio station licensed to Clinton, Kentucky, United States, and serving Paducah, as well as the greater Purchase area of Western Kentucky. The station is currently owned by the Bristol Broadcasting Company as part of a cluster with seven other stations. The Bristol group's studios are located off KY 994 south of Paducah in rural McCracken County, while its transmitter is located next to I-69 and KY 121 on the northwest side of Mayfield.

== History ==
The station went on the air in 1955 as WNGO-FM, a 97 watt FM simulcast to AM station WNGO (1320 AM). In 1975 the simulcast ended and the call letters WXID were chosen because "X" was the electronic symbol for stereo sound, while "I" and "D" are the ninth and fourth letters of the alphabet, respectively, resulting in 94. At its inception, the stations were owned by H.M. Suthard and Paul Mullins. The two would quickly sell WNGO in 1957 to competitor West Kentucky Broadcasting, owner of WKTM (1050 AM), which shut down following the purchase. A centerpiece of early WNGO programming was a Sunday morning Christian radio program originating from the local United Methodist Church, first titled The Widening Circle and later Radio Sunday School. WNGO-FM varied in formats over the years, at times simulcasting a country music format with WNGO and then changing call letters to WXID an operating its own adult contemporary setup.

Its call letters were changed to WBLN on March 17, 1997. The station would change call letters three times over the next forty months: to WIVR-FM the next year, dropping the suffix on September 24, 1999, and to WLLE on September 30, 2000. On June 14, 2004, the station would change calls again to WQQR.

By the mid-2000s, WQQR was owned by Bristol Broadcasting Company and aired a rock music format as Double Q 94.7. On September 15, 2008, the station re-launched their on-air product, adding a wider selection of music and a new logo. They also acquired the highly sought-after Brian James to be the voice of the station's imaging. On November 1, 2013, WQQR began hinting at a format change when it switched early to Christmas music under the branding Christmas 94.7. The Facebook site was taken down and the website was revamped, with a link to a YouTube video "Retooning the Holidays". A video was posted on Facebook by DJ Chris Cash signing the Double Q off the air for the final time. Later that month on the 28th, an advertising agency rep announced that the new format would be an Adult Contemporary station. The new format would launch on January 1, 2014, featuring adult contemporary music as 94.7 The Mix, ending a year-plus drought of the format in the market. The station's call letters would change to WZYK on April 10.

== Programming ==
As of April 2023, the weekday on-air line-up for WZYK is as follows:

- Murphy, Sam & Jody (5:00 a.m.-10:00 a.m.)
- Justin Jones (3:00 p.m.-7:00 p.m.)

The weekend is filled with syndicated programming such as Retro Pop Reunion, American Top 40 from the 1970s and 1980s, and Scott Shannon with America's Greatest Hits.
