= Slater High School =

Location
- 325 McDowell Street; Bristol, Tennessee
- 36°35′38.08″N 82°10′21.71″W

Information
- Established: 1900
- Closed: 1965
- Campus size: 3.75 acres (1.52 ha)
- Area: 70,100 square feet (6,510 m^{2})

Slater High School (also John F. Slater High School) was a segregated high school for African-Americans in Bristol, Tennessee, United States.

The school was named for John Fox Slater, a philanthropist who funded the education of freedmen after the Civil War.

== History ==
The school was founded as Bristol Normal School in 1900, administered by the United Presbyterian Church. A donation by the John F. Slater fund in 1914 enabled the Bristol, Tennessee Board of Education to purchase the school and property for $8,000. The name was changed to McDowell High School, and renamed to honor John F. Slater in 1955 after the school was enlarged.

The football team won the Tri-State championship in 1962.

The school closed in 1965 following desegregation and students were transferred to Tennessee High School.

The building was later occupied by the Slater Community Center.

== Notable alumni ==
- Vivian Wilson Henderson, educator and human rights activist; president of Clark Atlanta University.
