= WWTB =

- Bristol, Virginia; United States
- Broadcast area: Tri-Cities
- Frequency: 980 kHz
- Branding: 105.3 The Beat

Programming
- Format: Rhythmic contemporary
- Affiliations: Motor Racing Network

Ownership
- Owner: Bristol Broadcasting Company, Inc.
- Sister stations: WAEZ, WEXX, WFHG-FM, WLNQ, WNPC, WXBQ-FM

History
- First air date: January 1947
- Former call signs: WFHG (1947–1992); WXBQ (1992–2001); WFHG (2001–2017)

Technical information
- Licensing authority: FCC
- Facility ID: 6872
- Class: B
- Power: 5,000 watts (day); 1,000 watts (night)
- Transmitter coordinates: 36°36′30.0″N 82°9′36.0″W
- Translators: 98.9 W255DB (Bristol, TN); 105.3 W287CF (Bristol, TN)

Links
- Public license information: Public file; LMS
- Website: 105thebeat.com

WWTB is a Rhythmic contemporary formatted broadcast radio station licensed to Bristol, Virginia, serving the Tri-Cities. WWTB is owned and operated by Bristol Broadcasting Company.

On May 26, 2017, WFHG changed their format from talk to urban contemporary, branded as "105.3 The Beat", under new WWTB calls. Since then, the station has shifted to Rhythmic contemporary, adding rhythmic pop tracks while maintaining a Hip-Hop lean.

== Translator ==
In addition to the main station, WWTB is relayed by FM translators to widen its broadcast area.

Call sign	Frequency	City of license	FID	ERP (W)	HAAT	Class	FCC info
W255DB	98.9 FM	Bristol, Tennessee	140578	240	22 m (72 ft)	D	LMS
W287CF	105.3 FM	Bristol, Tennessee	157963	250	648 m (2,126 ft)	D	LMS
