= WVTS =

- Dunbar, West Virginia; United States
- Broadcast area: Charleston, West Virginia; Nitro, West Virginia
- Frequency: 1240 kHz
- Branding: NewsTalk 1240 WVTS

Programming
- Format: Talk radio

Ownership
- Owner: Bristol Broadcasting Company
- Sister stations: WBES, WQBE-FM, WVSR-FM, WYNL

History
- First air date: November 4, 1946
- Former call signs: WTIP (1946–1988); WVSR (1988–2000); WBES (2000–2010)
- Call sign meaning: "West Virginia's Talk Station"

Technical information
- Licensing authority: FCC
- Facility ID: 2682
- Class: C
- Power: 1,000 watts (unlimited)
- Transmitter coordinates: 38°23′8.34″N 81°42′50.46″W
- Translator: 95.7 W239CH (Charleston)

Links
- Public license information: Public file; LMS
- Website: www.bristolbroadcasting.com/charlestonmkt.shtml

WVTS is a news/talk formatted broadcast radio station licensed to Dunbar, West Virginia, serving Charleston and Nitro in West Virginia. WVTS is owned and operated by Bristol Broadcasting Company.

== FM translator ==
Broadcast translator for WVTS
Call sign	Frequency	City of license	FID	ERP (W)	HAAT	Class	Transmitter coordinates	FCC info
W239CH	95.7 FM	Charleston, West Virginia	18869	250	104 m (341 ft)	D	38°21′26.3″N 81°40′4.5″W	LMS
