= WYNL =

- Dunbar, West Virginia; United States
- Broadcast area: South-Central West Virginia
- Frequency: 94.5 MHz
- Branding: New Life 94.5

Programming
- Format: Christian adult contemporary

Ownership
- Owner: Bristol Broadcasting Company
- Sister stations: WBES, WQBE-FM, WVSR-FM, WVTS

History
- First air date: October 13, 1988
- Former call signs: WBES (1988); WBES-FM (1988–2001); WZJO (2001–2010); WVTS-FM (2010–2015)
- Call sign meaning: "Your New Life"

Technical information
- Licensing authority: FCC
- Facility ID: 2687
- Class: B1
- ERP: 9,600 watts
- HAAT: 160 meters (520 ft)
- Transmitter coordinates: 38°25′11.0″N 81°43′24.0″W

Links
- Public license information: Public file; LMS
- Webcast: Listen live
- Website: newlife945.com

WYNL is a Christian adult contemporary formatted broadcast radio station licensed to Dunbar, West Virginia, serving South-Central West Virginia. WYNL is owned and operated by Bristol Broadcasting Company.
