= Learfield =

College sports marketing company

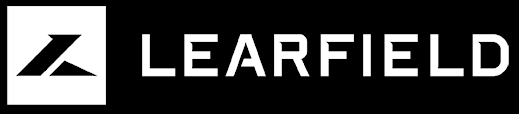
- Formerly: Learfield Sports; Learfield IMG College
- Type: Joint venture
- Industry: Sports Marketing, Television and Radio Production and Broadcasting
- Founded: December 31, 2018; 7 years ago
- Headquarters: Dallas, Texas, United States
- Services: Sports Marketing, Event Management
- Number of employees: 2,200
- Parent: Atairos Group; Endeavor Group Holdings
- Subsidiaries: Collegiate Licensing Company; Host Communications
- Website: www.learfield.com

Learfield (often stylized as LEARFIELD) is an American college sports marketing company. It represents more than 200 of the nation's top collegiate properties including the NCAA and its 89 championships, NCAA Football, leading conferences, and many of the most prestigious colleges and universities in the country. The company was previously known as Learfield IMG College before rebranding in 2021 to Learfield. Headquartered in Plano, Texas, Learfield employs more than 2,200 people in nearly 100 offices throughout the United States. The company was created in 2018 through the combination of Endeavor's IMG College division and Learfield Communications of Missouri, managed by the Atairos Group.

IMG College was formed from the acquisition of Host Communications and The Collegiate Licensing Company in 2007. Additionally ISP Sports was acquired in 2010.

In 2012, a joint venture with Learfield created IMG Learfield Ticket Solutions, now representing 30 universities in outsourced ticketing. Additionally, IMG College Seating, the largest premium cushion stadium seat provider in college athletics, now represents more than 90 universities nationwide, managing more than 500,000 college football stadium seats annually.

The IMG College Audio Network consists of more than 2,100 radio stations airing primarily football and men's basketball games along with weekly call-in coaches' shows. The media network also includes over 100 television stations airing weekly half hour coaches' shows for most of the universities represented by the company. IMG Audio produces more than 35,000 hours of college sports programming annually for these affiliate stations.

Host Communications was founded in 1974 and created one of the first college sports multimedia contracts with its creation of a radio network for the University of Kentucky. ISP Sports was founded in 1992 in Winston-Salem, North Carolina providing sports marketing and broadcast services for collegiate athletics across the United States. In addition to the Winston-Salem headquarters, the company operates more than 90 regional offices.

The organization also co-owned the Longhorn Network (which shut down in 2024 due to the team’s realignment with the Southeastern Conference) and Campus Insiders, the latter through which it held a stake in 120 Sports. Learfield is also the title sponsor of the NACDA Learfield Directors' Cup, which is awarded to the best athletic program in the country in each division.

== Leadership ==
- Cole Gahagan, President & Chief Executive Officer
- Kim Damron, President, Sports Properties
- Peter Lori, Chief Financial Officer
- Ben Mathan, Chief Strategy Officer
- Cory Moss, President, Brand Management & Marketing
- John Raleigh, Chief Legal Officer
- Kristine Schroeder, Chief People & Culture Officer

== Markets and schools ==
At the conference level, Learfield represents The American, A10, Big 12, Conference USA, Horizon League, MAC, MEAC, OVC, SEC and WCC, and also individually represents the NCAA, the Heisman Trophy and 26 Bowl games.

Learfield represents more than 150 universities in multi-media rights and more than 200 universities in trademark licensing, including, but not limited to:

- Abilene Christian
- Air Force
- Akron
- Alabama
- App State
- Arizona
- Arkansas at Little Rock
- Arkansas
- Arkansas State
- Army West Point
- Ball State
- Big Sky
- Boise State
- Boston College
- Bowling Green
- Bradley
- Brigham Young
- Brown
- Bucknell
- Buffalo
- Butler
- Cal
- Cal Poly
- Cal State Northridge
- Central Michigan
- Charlotte
- Cincinnati
- Colorado
- Colorado State
- CSU Bakersfield
- Dartmouth
- Davidson
- Delaware
- Drake
- Drexel
- Duke
- Eastern Michigan
- Eastern Washington
- Elon
- Evansville
- Florida
- Florida State
- Fresno State
- Georgia
- Georgia Southern
- Gonzaga
- Hawaii
- Houston
- Idaho State
- Idaho
- Illinois
- Illinois State
- Indiana
- Iowa
- Iowa State
- James Madison
- Kansas
- Kansas State
- Lehigh
- Long Beach State
- Louisiana at Monroe
- Louisiana
- Louisiana Tech
- Louisville
- Loyola University Chicago
- Marquette
- Marshall
- Massachusetts Amherst
- Memphis
- Michigan
- Minnesota
- Mississippi State
- Missouri State
- Missouri
- Montana
- Montana State
- NC State
- Nebraska Omaha
- Nevada
- New Hampshire
- New Mexico
- North Carolina
- North Dakota State
- North Texas
- Northern Arizona
- Northern Illinois
- Northern Iowa
- Northern Kentucky
- Northwestern
- Ohio
- Ohio State
- Oklahoma
- Oklahoma State
- Ole Miss
- Oregon
- Oregon State
- Penn State
- Princeton
- Providence
- Purdue
- Purdue Fort Wayne
- Rhode Island
- Rice
- Rutgers
- Saint Louis
- Saint Mary's
- Seton Hall
- SMU
- South Carolina
- South Dakota
- South Dakota
- Southern Illinois
- Southern Miss
- St. Cloud State
- St. John's
- St. Thomas
- Stanford
- Stephen F. Austin
- Syracuse
- TCU
- Temple
- Tennessee
- Texas A&M
- Texas
- Texas State
- Texas Tech
- Toledo
- Tulane
- Tulsa
- UAB
- UC Davis
- UC Irvine
- UC Riverside
- UCLA
- UConn
- UNC Asheville
- UNC Greensboro
- UNLV
- UT Arlington
- UT Chattanooga
- Utah State
- Vanderbilt
- VCU
- Vermont
- Virginia Tech
- Wake Forest
- Washington
- Washington State
- Weber State
- West Virginia
- Western Kentucky
- Wisconsin
- Wisconsin-Milwaukee
- Wyoming
- Xavier

== See also ==
- List of Virginia Tech IMG Sports Network stations
- Syracuse ISP Sports Network
