= WCGX =

- Galax, Virginia; United States
- Broadcast area: Carroll County, Virginia; Grayson County, Virginia
- Frequency: 1360 kHz
- Branding: WCGX The Cat

Programming
- Format: Oldies
- Affiliations: Townhall; Virginia News Network

Ownership
- Owner: Twin County Broadcasting Corporation

History
- First air date: February 1, 1947 (as WBOB)
- Former call signs: WBOB (1947–1997); WWWJ (1997–2016)
- Call sign meaning: "The Cat, Galax, VA"

Technical information
- Licensing authority: FCC
- Facility ID: 68600
- Class: D
- Power: 5,000 watts daytime 31 watts nighttime
- Transmitter coordinates: 36°39′48.0″N 80°54′52.0″W
- Translator: 96.5 W243EH (Galax)

Links
- Public license information: Public file; LMS
- Webcast: Listen Live
- Website: www.wcgx.rocks

WCGX (1360 AM) is a radio station licensed to Galax, Virginia, serving Carroll and Grayson counties and the Independent City of Galax in Virginia. Owned by Twin County Broadcasting Corporation, the station airs an oldies format.

== History ==
WCGX went on the air on February 1, 1947, with the call sign WBOB and carried a southern gospel format. In 1997, the station adopted the WWWJ callsign. In 2016, the station flipped to a classic hits format as "The Cat", with the station changing its calls to WCGX to reflect the branding. In July 2017, the station signed on translator W243EH on 96.5 FM, also licensed to Galax. In November 2024, the station and the translator both went silent. The station signed back on in early December 2024.

== History ==
WCGX launched on February 1, 1947, as WBOB. At noon on April 1, 2016, the station changed its format from Southern Gospel to Classic Hits and Oldies, branded as "The Cat". The station also changed its callsign, from WWWJ to WCGX, on the same day.
