= WBES =

- Charleston, West Virginia; United States
- Broadcast area: South-Central West Virginia
- Frequency: 950 kHz
- Branding: 95 The Sports Fox

Programming
- Format: Sports
- Affiliations: Fox Sports Radio

Ownership
- Owner: Bristol Broadcasting Company
- Sister stations: WQBE-FM, WVSR-FM, WVTS, WYNL

History
- First air date: February 16, 1957
- Former call signs: WKAZ (1957–1983); WQBE (1983–2001); WVTS (2001–2010)
- Call sign meaning: "Beautiful Entertainment in Stereo"

Technical information
- Licensing authority: FCC
- Facility ID: 6873
- Class: B
- Power: 5,000 watts (day); 1,000 watts (night)
- Transmitter coordinates: 38°23′11.0″N 81°42′51.0″W
- Translator: 92.7 W224EE (Charleston)

Links
- Public license information: Public file; LMS

WBES (950 AM) is a sports formatted broadcast radio station licensed to Charleston, West Virginia, serving South-Central West Virginia. WBES is owned and operated by Bristol Broadcasting Company.

== History ==
WKAZ signed on the air as a Top 40 station on February 16, 1957, and remained as a popular Top 40 station for the Charleston area for almost three decades. After losing the CHR battle against dominant leader WVSR-FM as well as many listeners flipping to FM for contemporary hits in the early-1980s, WKAZ changed its call letters to WQBE and dropped Top 40 in 1983 and flipped to a country format. The station remained with the format until the station dropped music altogether in 2001 for talk and remained like that until 2010 when the station flipped to sports after changing its callsign to WBES, featuring programming from Fox Sports Radio.
