= WKYX-FM =

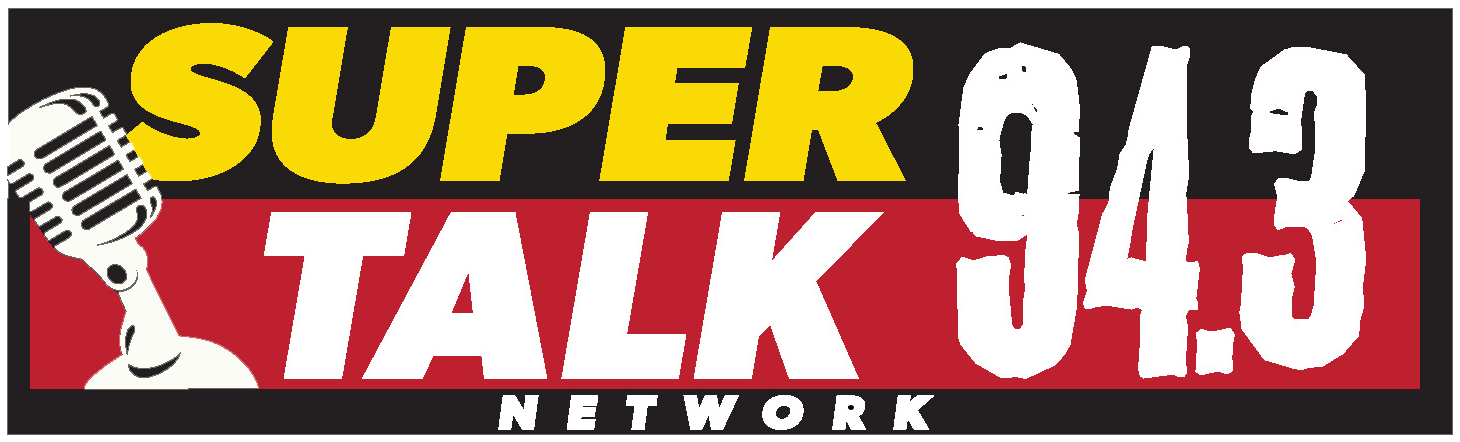
- Golconda, Illinois; United States
- Broadcast area: Paducah, Kentucky
- Frequency: 94.3 MHz
- Branding: Super Talk 94.3

Programming
- Format: News–talk
- Affiliations: Fox News Radio; Premiere Networks; Salem Radio Network; Westwood One

Ownership
- Owner: Bristol Broadcasting Company, Inc.
- Sister stations: WBMP, WDDJ, WDXR, WKYQ, WLLE, WNGO, WPAD, WZYK

History
- First air date: November 22, 1990; 35 years ago
- Former call signs: WXZB (1990); WDXR-FM (1990–2002); WPFX (2002); WLIE (2002); WLIE-FM (2002–2006)

Technical information
- Licensing authority: FCC
- Facility ID: 40647
- Class: A
- ERP: 3,100 watts
- HAAT: 137 meters (449 ft)
- Transmitter coordinates: 37°14′4″N 88°29′48″W

Links
- Public license information: Public file; LMS
- Webcast: Listen Live
- Website: wkyx.com

Simulcast
- WNGO
- Mayfield, Kentucky; United States
- Frequency: 1320 kHz

Ownership
- Owner: Bristol Broadcasting Company, Inc.

History
- First air date: January 7, 1947; 79 years ago
- Former call signs: WIVR (1998–1999); WKJM (1999–2004)
- Call sign meaning: We Need God Only

Technical information
- Facility ID: 71614
- Class: D
- Power: 1,000 watts day; 97 watts night
- Transmitter coordinates: 36°45′37″N 88°38′20″W
- Translator: 105.9 W290DF (Mayfield)

Links
- Public license information: Public file; LMS

WKYX-FM (94.3 MHz) is a radio station broadcasting a news/talk format. WKYX-FM is licensed to serve Golconda, Illinois. WKYX-FM's programming is also heard on WNGO (1320 AM) in Mayfield, Kentucky. The stations are owned by Bristol Broadcasting Company, Inc. and feature programming from Fox News Radio, Premiere Networks, Salem Radio Network, and Westwood One.

== History ==
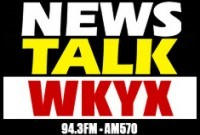
WKYX AM 570 & FM 94.3 former logo

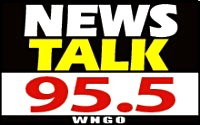
WNGO AM 1320 & FM translator W238AN FM 95.5 former logo

=== History of WKYX-FM ===
The station signed on the air at 94.3 FM on November 22, 1990, as WXZB. Before the year ended, the station changed its callsign to WDXR-FM. In 2002, the station briefly was recalled as WPFX, and then WLIE-FM shortly before the start of 2003. The current WKYX-FM callsign was adopted in 2006.

=== History of WNGO ===
The station signed on the air on January 7, 1947, as Mayfield's second radio station to open after WKTM (1050 kHz) opened the previous year. WNGO was mostly a religious radio station, with local church minister H.M. Suthard and Paul Mullins as the original owners. Amazing Grace was the first song to be played on the station in its inaugural broadcast.

The station would launch WNGO-FM (94.7 MHz, now WZYK) in 1955 in order to broadcast local sporting events at night. In 1957, the station was sold to West Kentucky Broadcasting Company. Operations of WKTM was merged with that of WNGO that year; the 1050 kHz frequency WKTM originally occupied was reassigned to WNES of Central City in 1960.

The station's studios fell victim of flooding on two separate occasions in 1983.

=== Recent developments ===
On December 26, 2022, WKYX 570 AM and translator W265DZ 100.9 FM split from the news/talk simulcast with WKYX-FM and WNGO.
