= WKYQ =

Radio station in Paducah, Kentucky

Coordinates: 37.049°N 88.614°W

- Paducah, Kentucky; United States
- Broadcast area: Paducah, Kentucky
- Frequency: 93.3 MHz
- Branding: 93.3 WKYQ

Programming
- Format: Country music

Ownership
- Owner: Bristol Broadcasting Company, Inc.
- Sister stations: WBMP, WDDJ, WDXR, WKYX-FM, WLLE, WNGO, WPAD, WZYK

History
- Call sign meaning: Kentucky

Technical information
- Licensing authority: FCC
- Facility ID: 6877
- Class: C1
- ERP: 100,000 watts
- HAAT: 279 meters (915 ft)
- Translator: 95.5 W238AN (Mayfield)

Links
- Public license information: Public file; LMS
- Website: www.wkyq.com

WKYQ (93.3 FM) is a country music formatted radio station based in Paducah, Kentucky. WKYQ broadcasts with an effective radiated power of 100,000 watts and antenna 279 meters height above average terrain. WKYQ serves Paducah and western Kentucky, southern Illinois, northwest Tennessee, and parts of southeastern Missouri. WKYQ is owned by Bristol Broadcasting Company, Inc.

== Current line-up ==
As of June 2022 the on-air line-up for WKYQ is as follows:

=== Weekdays ===
- Bobby & Steve in the morning 6a-10a
- "Dr." Jeff 10a-3p
- Mark Ryan 3p-7p
- Matt 7p-Midnight

=== Weekends ===
- There is a rotating live local air staff on the weekends. with some local and syndicated programs.
- The Outlaw Hours, Friday night 10p -Saturday 3a and Saturday night 10p - Sunday 3a
- Topper's Country Gospel, Sunday 7a-9a
- The Rabbit Countdown, Sunday 11a-3p
- CT40 with Fitz, Sunday 6p-10p
- Retro Country USA, Sunday 10p-Midnight
