= WIAR (Kentucky) =

Radio station in Paducah, Kentucky, United States (1922–1924)

WIAR was Paducah, Kentucky's first radio broadcasting station. It was initially licensed in July 1922, ceased making regular broadcasts in May 1923, and was formally deleted in early 1924.

== History ==
=== Establishment ===
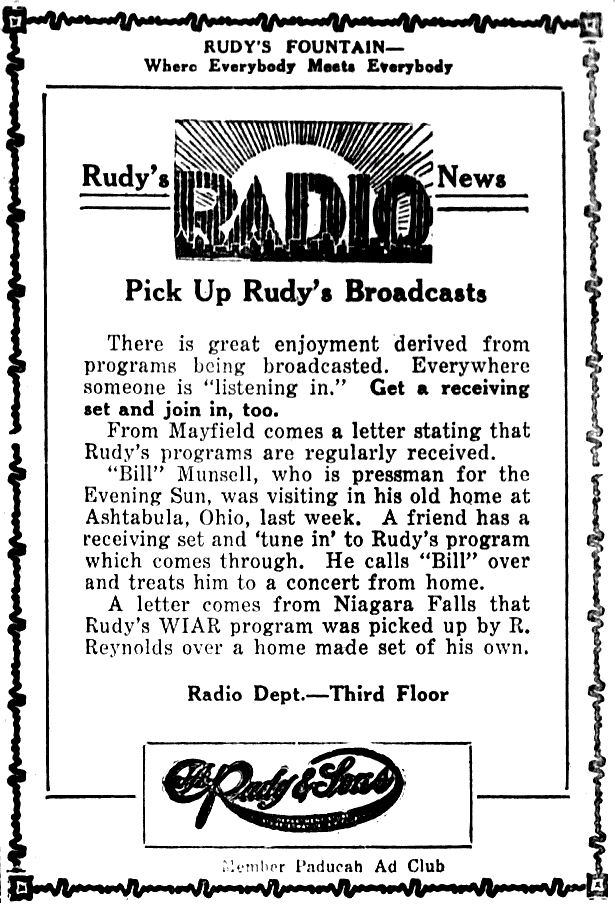
WIAR was founded by Rudy and Sons department store

Effective December 1, 1921, the U.S. Department of Commerce, which regulated radio communication at this time, adopted regulations to formally establish a broadcast service category, which set aside the wavelength of 360 meters (833 kHz) for "entertainment" broadcasting, and 485 meters (619 kHz) for "market and weather reports".

By mid-1922 hundreds of radio stations had been licensed. However Kentucky was one of the last states to get a station, and when the Louisville Courier-Journal received a license for WHAS on July 13, 1922, it was 45th out of the then-48 states to join the broadcasting ranks. A few days later WIAR became the second licensed Kentucky station, when J. A. Rudy and Sons, a department store located at 115 South Third Street in Paducah, was issued a license "during the week beginning 17 July 1922". WIAR was authorized to transmit on the 833 kHz "entertainment" frequency, and its call letters were randomly assigned from an alphabetical list. There is little information about WIAR's programming when it was operated by Rudy's, although it was common during this era for department stores to establish stations in order to boost sales of radio receivers.

In late November the Paducah Evening Sun, a daily newspaper owned by Paducah's Paxton family, began taking responsibility for the station's programming, and effective January 1, 1923, assumed full ownership. The transmitter room and small studio were located on the second floor of the Sun's plant on South 3rd Street. The Sun heavily promoted the station, and the paper, which previously had only sparingly run stories about radio, now carried several features daily about the station and radio in general. A technical series reviewed receiving circuits, including schematics and detailed instructions on how readers could build sets, and the newspaper ran a full-page list of all the stations in the United States. One front-page article detailed how a Paducah man received WIAR with a crystal receiver created by wrapping a wire around a lead pencil and attaching this to a doorknob and ground connection.

=== Programming ===
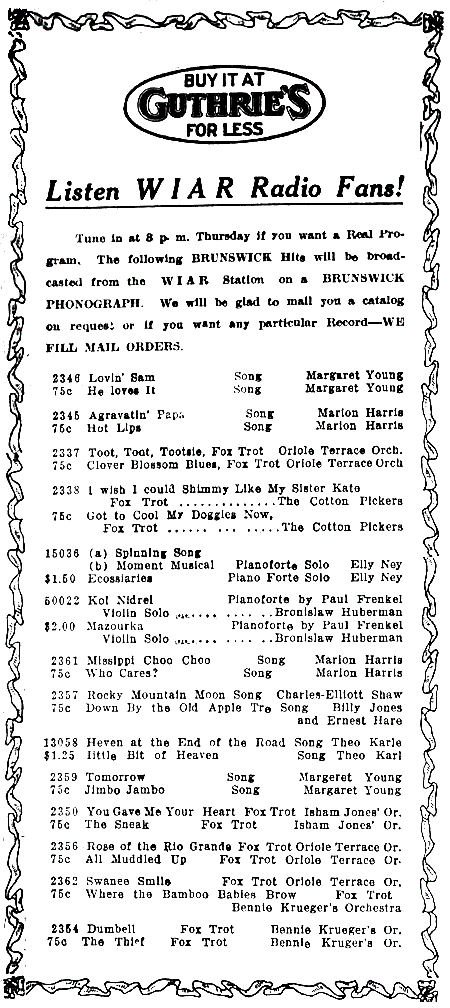
Although WIAR didn't sell airtime, it sometimes featured programming provided by commercial enterprises.

Under the Sun's oversight WIAR generally broadcast from 7-8 p.m. Monday through Saturday, and would often also present an afternoon sports broadcast. As was nearly universally true for this era, WIAR's programming was entirely live, but because it did not sell advertising, performers, who were overwhelmingly local amateurs, normally were not paid. The station manager at this time at WHAS in Louisville, who had a similar schedule and the benefit of a somewhat larger city, later summed up this state of affairs as: "You may think the preparation of shows from four to five o'clock every afternoon, and seven-thirty to nine each night except Sundays, would be quite a simple undertaking. But sometime when you've nothing else to do, try it for a few years, depending entirely upon unpaid amateur talent. First, however, accept a friendly tip and engage your room in a sanitarium."

WIAR was constantly on the lookout for people to sing, play instruments, and perform for listeners. The Sun also asked local residents to notify them when talented friends or family visited from out of town. The newspaper ran detailed reviews of each previous night's broadcasting. Performers included jazz bands, Rotary Club performers, singers, and violinists. An African-American choir, billed as "Negro Harmonists" performed a set of "sacred songs". Paducah resident Joe Allen, known as an "expert imitator of animals and birds", presented a program called "Kentucky Possum Hunt" which featured Allen playing every character including the dogs and the coon. Alben Barkley, then United States congressional representative from Paducah and future Vice President, made a broadcast, as did Paducah native and humorist Irvin Cobb. Cobb would later go on to perform on network radio, using his unique brand of Southern humor to entertain listeners. Both Barkley and Cobb were said to have "made their first broadcast speeches over WIAR".

Although newspaper-owned stations of this era commonly did not pay their performers, they could compensate them with free publicity, which as Rex White at the Detroit News station WWJ later noted, was always favorable, and sometimes lavish, "or we would have no show the next night". Representative Paducah Evening Sun headlines from January 1923 include "Concerts Continue to Bring Praises for Sun Station", "Impressive are Music Programs by Sun's Radio", and "Artists Keep Up Splendid Quality of WIAR Concerts".

=== Operation ===
In mid-January, the station went off the air for a day in order to make improvements. The paper reported that technology was changing and the Sun wanted to provide listeners the best possible experience. The studio walls were padded — reportedly by draping old World War I army blankets — to "intensify the sound" and improve quality. Most of the transmitting equipment was moved to a separate room, and the studio became a closed set, with only performers allowed in during broadcasts.

The Sun considered its station as a means for promoting civic pride on a national stage, and the newspaper reasoned that letters coming in from distant locations meant that listeners would probably be interested in the city that produced such entertaining programming. In March 1923, Fred G. Neuman, author of The Story of Paducah and Paducahans in History presented a program about Paducah as "that gem in diadem of American cities…", and the show's script was re-printed in the paper.

It was about this time that the Sun started printing portions of listeners' letters in the paper. The national appeal and reach of radio was seen in letters from listeners both nearby and from areas such as Texas, Minnesota, and California. The paper later bragged about letters and telegrams of praise from as far away as Canada. The programming consisted of local citizens, therefore each station had a sound that was exclusive to its region. A Sun story reported that Mike Danaher, a Paducah businessman, went to the home office of his company in Colorado Springs, Colorado, and was able to hear a program from his hometown at a listening Kasstation. A Colorado Springs newspaper further reported that the "radio fans" had "heard concerts from Paducah, Kansas, and Fort Worth, Texas". The station was heard as far away as Pittsburg, Kansas, and Indianapolis, Indiana. An article in a Pittsburg newspaper January 28, 1923, reported that Robert C. Ernhart had listened to 33 radio stations the preceding Friday afternoon and night. Among those listed was "WIAR, Paducah." Similarly, a writer from Indianapolis, in a magazine article, listed WIAR among stations he had heard on his one-tube receiver. WIAR was also mentioned in an ad in the April 1924 issue of Popular Radio. The ad for "The Improved Miraco" receiver touted the success of E.D. Elliott of Milford, New York, in receiving stations from a variety of locations, including "WIAR Paducah." At one point, the station asked listeners to write in, telling where they received WIAR's signal. "The most distant response came from New Zealand."

But just as listeners from far away were tuning in to hear Paducah stations, some local radio fans were tuning in to hear stations from outside the Paducah area. Radio was a hobby to many, and tracking stations from points afar was entertainment itself, and many stations began observing "silent nights", when they remained off the air in order to reduce interference with the reception of distant signals. At the beginning of March 1923, WIAR announced that it would stop broadcasting on Saturday nights.

=== Fan club ===
The fans of radio came together to form a club in February. Charter members set Edwin J. Paxton, owner of WIAR, as the president, and the club had 130 members within two weeks. The club said it represented about ten percent of the radio set owners in Paducah, which the paper estimated to be about 1,000. The radio club held meetings at the car barns of the Paducah Railway Company at Fourteenth and Broadway and would occasionally have control of WIAR during the evening broadcast hour. In March, the club called for people who could "moan to the bones" to play "craps by radio." While the details were sketchy and the call was riddled with the slang of the day, the club made it known that those to the west and north of the station would be appreciative of "southern songs, games, and pastimes, and a real 'OONTZ' party would create no end of interest. A later review of the dice game reported that four "colored performers" were given two dollars in nickels, a pair of dice, and then invited into the studio. After getting over a bit of stage fright, the program was reportedly "a riot", and letters came in asking for more programs of its type.

=== Community service ===
In addition to providing local programming, the newspaper promoted its station's services to the community. The Paducah radio club, along with WIAR and the Sun, started a fundraiser to purchase a radio for Paducah's orphanage, then known as the Home of the Friendless. Radio fans wanted to share the new world of radio with the children and reasoned that the innovation was meant to instruct as well as entertain. According to a March 19 plea in the Sun:

Possessing a radio set, the children of the Home can tune in each day and evening, and the simple process of tuning in will open up to them a new world rich in charm and mystery. The infinite happiness they may attain from such a gift will repay whatever sum may be expended in its purchase, a million fold.

Early in the campaign, the Paducah Exchange club held a radio-broadcasting banquet at the station, a live radio event that boasted fourteen entertainment acts. Children from the Home of the Friendless listened to the broadcast at the car barns in the rail yard where the radio club held meetings. Several Paducah businesses and businessmen also raised funds to give local firemen a radio for the central station. The firemen had been tinkering with homemade sets, but the new set included a 100-foot (30m) antenna wire that stretched from the fire station to the flagpole on city hall.

=== Station closure ===
As of March 1, 1923, WIAR was one of only four stations — and the only one in the western half of the state — located in Kentucky. However, the next month the Sun announced that the station would close for the summer season, ending regular evening broadcasts until the fall, because the unventilated studio would be very uncomfortable for performers during the warmer months. At the same time the paper announced that afternoon baseball news broadcasts would begin in three days, which would continue throughout the summer. The last entertainment program was an appearance by the George Rock Minstrels on the evening of May 2, 1923, moreover, promotion of the daily baseball score broadcasts ceased in mid-May, after which the newspaper made no further references to the station or its possible return. WIAR was formally stricken from government records the following March. Station equipment was sold to the Acme Flour Mill in Hopkinsville, a Louisville, Kentucky, company, and in early 1927 this company founded station WFIW in Hopkinsville (now WGTK in Louisville).

A 1946 review of WIAR's short life stated that operations were expensive, especially since the absence of advertising revenue meant the newspaper was responsible for its full costs. It was estimated that $3,500 was spent setting up the station at the Sun, and a major expense was due to an average of two or three vacuum tubes burning out every day, at a cost of seven dollars apiece. A later account also reported a staffing issue caused when the station's licensed "operator had left to gain employment in Louisville".

Paducah would be without a local radio station until WPAD debuted in 1930. In 1946 the newspaper, now known as the Sun-Democrat, returned to the airwaves when it started AM station WKYB (now WBMP). In 1957, the newspaper founded TV station WPSD.
