= WYTI =

- Rocky Mount, Virginia; United States
- Broadcast area: Rocky Mount, Virginia; Franklin County, Virginia
- Frequency: 1570 kHz
- Branding: Classic Hit Country - WYTI

Programming
- Format: Full-service
- Affiliations: Motor Racing Network; Performance Racing Network

Ownership
- Owner: Turner Media Group, Inc.
- Sister stations: WZBB

History
- First air date: 1957

Technical information
- Licensing authority: FCC
- Facility ID: 74280
- Class: B
- Power: 2,500 watts (day); 220 watts (night)
- Transmitter coordinates: 36°58′37.0″N 79°53′45.0″W
- Translator: 104.5 W283CQ (Rocky Mount)

Links
- Public license information: Public file; LMS
- Webcast: Listen live
- Website: wytiradio.com

WYTI (1570 AM) is a full-service formatted radio station licensed to Rocky Mount, Virginia, serving Rocky Mount and Franklin County, Virginia.

Former logo

In March, 2017 WYTI started being relayed on 250 watt translator W283CQ on 104.5 MHz.
