= WSEV-FM =

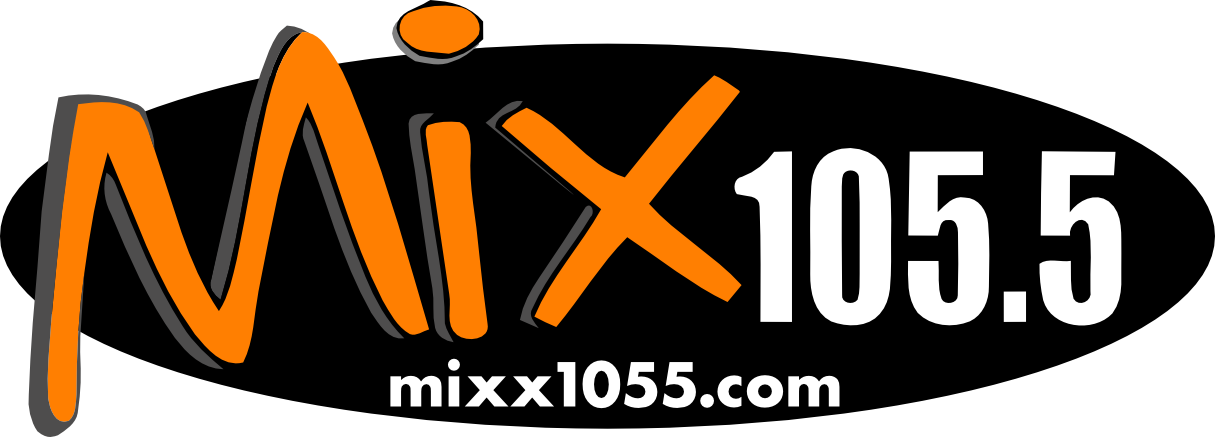
- Gatlinburg, Tennessee; United States
- Broadcast area: Sevierville, Tennessee
- Frequency: 105.5 MHz
- Branding: Mix 105.5

Programming
- Format: Adult contemporary

Ownership
- Owner: East Tennessee Radio Group, LP
- Sister stations: WPFT

History
- First air date: 1983
- Former call signs: WVTN (1983–1987); WNKX (April–December 1987); WSEV-FM (1987–1990); WDLY (1990–2000)
- Call sign meaning: Sevierville, from former sister station WSEV (AM)

Technical information
- Licensing authority: FCC
- Facility ID: 17059
- Class: A
- ERP: 530 watts
- HAAT: 322 meters (1,056 ft)
- Transmitter coordinates: 35°42′13″N 83°33′57″W

Links
- Public license information: Public file; LMS
- Webcast: Listen live
- Website: www.mixx1055.com

WSEV-FM (105.5 FM, "Mix 105.5") is a radio station in Gatlinburg, Tennessee, that operates as the only local FM radio station in Sevier County. While other stations are licensed to Sevierville, their studios are based in Knoxville. WSEV-FM is owned by East Tennessee Radio Group, and broadcasts an adult contemporary format.

== History ==
WSEV-FM was originally licensed to Gatlinburg, Tennessee, as a sister to WSEV, although the studios for both stations were located in Sevierville, Tennessee. In 1990 the station was purchased, along with WSEV, by the Dollywood Broadcasting Company, a privately owned corporation whose owners included Dolly Parton; Orr & Earls Broadcasting, Inc., of Branson, Missouri; and other investors. Orr & Earls Broadcasting, Inc. was selected as the managing partner due to their success in managing Branson-area radio stations KRZK and KOMC. WSEV-FM's call letters were changed to WDLY to reflect the connection with Parton, and the design of the call letters incorporated the Dollywood theme park's butterfly logo. Its format was changed to country music. However, WDLY had a tough time competing against Knoxville's WIVK-FM and WOKI during the years they had a country format.

After ten years as WDLY, the station was sold to East Tennessee Radio Group and the call sign reverted to WSEV-FM in May 2000. Its studios were moved from Middle Creek Road in Sevierville to Dumplin Valley Road in Kodak, Tennessee.
