= WMEV-FM =

Radio station in Marion, Virginia

- Marion, Virginia; United States
- Broadcast area: Southwest Virginia
- Frequency: 93.9 MHz
- Branding: 93.9 WMEV

Programming
- Format: Country

Ownership
- Owner: Bristol Broadcasting Company; (Bristol Broadcasting Company, Inc.)
- Sister stations: WHNK, WUKZ, WZVA, WOLD-FM

History
- First air date: 1961
- Call sign meaning: Wonderful Mountain Empire of Virginia

Technical information
- Licensing authority: FCC
- Facility ID: 63711
- Class: C
- ERP: 100,000 Watts Horizontal; 95,140 Watts Vertical
- HAAT: 452 meters
- Transmitter coordinates: 36°54′4.0″N 81°32′35.0″W

Links
- Public license information: Public file; LMS
- Webcast: WMEV-FM Webstream
- Website: WMEV-FM Online

WMEV-FM is a Country-formatted broadcast radio station licensed to Marion, Virginia, serving Southwestern Virginia. WMEV-FM is owned and operated by Bristol Broadcasting Company.

== Signal ==
WMEV-FM's signal, which broadcasts with an effective radiated power of 100,000 watts, covers parts of Virginia, Tennessee, West Virginia, North Carolina, and Kentucky.

== History ==
WMEV-FM signed on June 21, 1961. Bob and Stella Wolfenden started WMEV and WMEV-FM, selling them in 1982 to Marion natives Hugh and Barbara Gwyn, who increased the FM's signal strength. In 1998, Holston Valley Broadcasting bought the stations.

Effective January 1, 2017, Glenwood Communications sold WMEV-FM, sister station WUKZ, and translator W266BM to Bristol Broadcasting Company for $1.75 million.
