= WFHG-FM =

- Bluff City, Tennessee; United States
- Broadcast area: Tri-Cities, Tennessee-Virginia
- Frequency: 92.9 MHz
- Branding: Super Talk 92.9

Programming
- Format: Talk
- Affiliations: Fox News Radio; Premiere Networks; Salem Radio Network

Ownership
- Owner: Bristol Broadcasting Company
- Sister stations: WAEZ, WEXX, WWTB, WLNQ, WNPC, WXBQ

History
- First air date: 1966
- Former call signs: WABN-FM (1981–2001)
- Former frequencies: 92.9 MHz (1982–2001); 92.7 MHz (2001–2009)

Technical information
- Licensing authority: FCC
- Facility ID: 36982
- Class: C2
- Power: 7,600 watts
- HAAT: 378 meters (1,240 ft)
- Transmitter coordinates: 36°16′10.0″N 82°20′17.0″W

Links
- Public license information: Public file; LMS
- Webcast: WFHG Webstream
- Website: WFHG Online

WFHG-FM is a talk formatted broadcast radio station licensed to Bluff City, Tennessee and serving the Tri-Cities region of Tennessee and Virginia. WFHG is owned and operated by Bristol Broadcasting Company, Inc.
