= WLLE =

- Mayfield, Kentucky; United States
- Broadcast area: Paducah, Kentucky
- Frequency: 102.1 MHz
- Branding: Willie 102.1

Programming
- Format: Classic country

Ownership
- Owner: Bristol Broadcasting Company, Inc.
- Sister stations: WBMP, WDDJ, WDXR, WKYQ, WKYX-FM, WNGO, WPAD, WZYK

History
- Former call signs: WCBF (1997–2002); WYKL (2002–2003); WKBG (2003–2004)
- Call sign meaning: "Willie"

Technical information
- Licensing authority: FCC
- Facility ID: 56556
- Class: C2
- ERP: 50,000 watts
- HAAT: 144 meters (472 ft)
- Transmitter coordinates: 36°45′57.80″N 88°38′49.80″W

Links
- Public license information: Public file; LMS
- Website: willieradio.com

WLLE (102.1 FM) is a radio station broadcasting a classic country format. Licensed to Mayfield, Kentucky, United States, the station serves the Paducah area. The station is currently owned by Bristol Broadcasting Company, Inc.

== History ==
The station was assigned call sign WCBF on April 18, 1997. On May 1, 2002, the station changed its call sign to WYKL; it became WKBG on May 12, 2003, and WLLE on June 14, 2004.
