= WUKZ =

- Marion, Virginia; United States
- Broadcast area: Marion, Virginia; Smyth County, Virginia
- Frequency: 1010 kHz
- Branding: KZ-105.1 FM

Programming
- Format: Classic hits

Ownership
- Owner: Lisa Nininger Bouldin; (Bristol Broadcasting Company, Inc.)
- Sister stations: WMEV-FM, WOLD-FM, WHNK, WZVA

History
- First air date: December 12, 1948 (as WMEV)
- Former call signs: WMEV (1948–2010)

Technical information
- Licensing authority: FCC
- Facility ID: 63710
- Class: D
- Power: 1,000 watts day
- Transmitter coordinates: 36°51′23.0″N 81°30′21.0″W
- Translator: 105.1 W286DG (Marion)

Links
- Public license information: Public file; LMS

WUKZ (1010 AM) is a broadcast radio station licensed to serve the community of Marion, Virginia, United States. The station broadcasts a classic hits format to Marion and Smyth County, Virginia. WUKZ is owned and operated by Lisa Nininger Bouldin, through licensee Bristol Broadcasting Company, Inc.

== History ==
The station was known as WMEV from its initial sign-on date of December 12, 1948, under the ownership of Mountain Empire Broadcasting Corporation, through the late 1982 sale to Summit Broadcasting, Inc., and the mid-1998 acquisition by Glenwood Communications Corporation. The call sign stood for Wonderful Mountain Empire of Virginia.

On November 20, 2010, the station dropped its longtime WMEV call sign to become WUKZ. Concurrent with this change, the station dropped its Southern Gospel format and rebranded itself as "Christmas 101.1" with an all-Christmas music format.

On January 1, 2011, WUKZ dropped Christmas music for Classic Hits and picked up the branding "KZ-101.1FM".

Effective January 1, 2017, Glenwood Communications sold WUKZ, sister station WMEV-FM, and translator W266BM to Bristol Broadcasting Company for $1.75 million.

== Translator ==
In addition to the main station, WUKZ is relayed by an FM translator to widen its broadcast area.

Call sign	Frequency	City of license	FID	ERP (W)	HAAT	Class	FCC info
W286DG	105.1 FM	Marion, Virginia	201089	250	0 m (0 ft)	D	LMS
