= WSEV (AM) =

Coordinates: 35°52′42″N 83°33′18″W

- Sevierville, Tennessee; United States
- Frequency: 930 kHz
- Branding: Watson 104.1

Programming
- Format: Adult hits

Ownership
- Owner: Lisa Nininger Bouldin; (Bristol Broadcasting Company, Inc.)
- Sister stations: WLNQ; WNPC

History
- First air date: April 23, 1955
- Call sign meaning: Sevierville

Technical information
- Licensing authority: FCC
- Facility ID: 17058
- Class: D
- Power: 5,000 watts day; 148 watts night
- Translator: 104.1 W281BQ (Sevierville)

Links
- Public license information: Public file; LMS

WSEV (930 kHz) operates as Sevierville, Tennessee's first and only local AM radio station. While other stations are licensed to Sevierville, their studios are based in Knoxville, Tennessee. WSEV is owned by Bristol Broadcasting Company and broadcasts an adult hits format, branded "Watson 104.1" in reflection of translator station W281BQ (104.1 FM).

== History ==
WSEV is the heritage station in Sevierville, Tennessee. It has aired the talents of future country music singers, including Dolly Parton. In 1990 the station was purchased, along with its FM sister station WSEV-FM 105.5, by the Dollywood Broadcasting Company, a privately owned corporation whose shareholders included Parton; managing partner Orr & Earls Broadcasting, Inc., of Branson, Missouri; and other investors. The AM station's call letters remained WSEV, but the FM's call letters were changed to WDLY to reflect the connection with Parton. In 1992 a remote broadcast booth was built on the Dollywood theme park, similar to the WSM broadcast booth located at the Opryland USA theme park in Nashville, Tennessee.

WSEV's format fluctuated during the 1990s. Its programming mostly consisted of classic country during the day, with mornings featuring "Swap and Shop", a locally produced call-in show for buyers and sellers of household items, local news throughout the day, and a simulcast of WDLY's modern country format at night. Locally produced sports talk programming continued to be added to the schedule.

In 2000, the East Tennessee Radio Group purchased WSEV and WDLY from the Dollywood Broadcasting Company and later moved the studios from their old location on Middle Creek Road in Sevierville, Tennessee, to a location on Dumplin Valley Road in Kodak, Tennessee. Prior to adopting a full-time sports talk format, WSEV simulcast WSEV-FM's "Mix 105.5" adult contemporary format.

East Tennessee Radio Group sold WSEV (AM) to Grand Crowne Resorts with application filed on April 21, 2008.

Under Grand Crowne, WSEV was a "barker" station: It broadcast continuous advertisements for the Pigeon Forge area attractions, interspersed with Tennessee Trivia and comedy routines by "Milton Crabapple, Sheriff of Crabapple County". Milton Crabapple explained life in Crabapple County, telling the exploits of himself and the other citizens, all of whom seemed to have "Crabapple" as either their surnames or parts of their names (such as a "cousin in show business", P.T. Crabapple). Billboards on approaching highways touted the station to incoming travelers. In 2012, WSEV changed its imaging from Pigeon Forge Radio to Smoky Mountain Radio.

On August 19, 2015, owner Grand Crowne Resorts took WSEV silent for financial reasons and applied to the Federal Communications Commission (FCC) for authority to remain silent for 180 days. On November 9, 2015, AllAccess.com reported that Grand Crowne was selling WSEV to Bristol Broadcasting Co. for $25,000. The sale was consummated on January 14, 2016.

Since 2017, WSEV has been airing a variety hits format as "Watson 104.1", referencing co-owned FM translator W281BQ. The slogan used in its liners is "Watson 104.1, We Play Everything".
