= WNPC =

- Newport, Tennessee; United States
- Frequency: 1060 kHz
- Branding: 92.3 WNPC

Programming
- Format: Country

Ownership
- Owner: Bristol Broadcasting Company, Inc.
- Sister stations: WLNQ, WSEV

History
- Former call signs: WNPC (?-2007); WGGQ (2007–2011)

Technical information
- Licensing authority: FCC
- Facility ID: 70636
- Class: D
- Power: 1,000 watts day
- Transmitter coordinates: 35°59′10.00″N 83°10′46.00″W
- Translator: (102.5 MHz) W273DK (Morristown)

Links
- Public license information: Public file; LMS
- Website: 923wnpc.com

WNPC (1060 AM) is a radio station licensed to Newport, Tennessee, United States. The station is owned by Bristol Broadcasting Company, Inc.

1060 AM is a United States and Mexican clear-channel frequency, on which KYW and XEEP-AM are the dominant Class A stations. WNPC must leave the air during nighttime hours to avoid interfering with the skywave signal of those Class A stations.

== FM Translator ==
In addition to the main station at 1060 kHz, WNPC is relayed by FM translators; this gives the listener the choice of FM, and high fidelity sound. During nighttime hours, WNPC must leave the air; the FM translators allow WNPC to broadcast 24 hours a day. The FM frequency is shown in the Logo as the primary frequency in the station branding.

Broadcast translators for WNPC
Call sign	Frequency	City of license	FID	ERP (W)	HAAT	Class	FCC info
W222AN	92.3 FM	Newport, Tennessee	157122	250	126.7 m (416 ft)	D	LMS
W273DK	102.5 FM	Morristown, Tennessee	200934	250	119 m (390 ft)	D	LMS
