= WLNQ =

- White Pine, Tennessee; United States
- Broadcast area: Morristown, Tennessee
- Frequency: 104.7 MHz
- Branding: 104-7 WLNQ

Programming
- Format: Country

Ownership
- Owner: Bristol Broadcasting Company, Inc.
- Sister stations: WSEV, WNPC

History
- First air date: March 2012

Technical information
- Licensing authority: FCC
- Facility ID: 73346
- Class: A
- ERP: 2,800 watts
- HAAT: 150 meters (490 ft)
- Transmitter coordinates: 36°13′0.00″N 83°11′38.00″W

Links
- Public license information: Public file; LMS
- Website: www.1047wlnq.com

WLNQ (104.7 FM) is a radio station broadcasting a country music format. Licensed to White Pine, Tennessee, United States, the station is currently owned by Bristol Broadcasting Company, Inc. Serving Hamblen and surrounding counties in east Tennessee.

== Programming ==
=== Monday-Friday ===
- "Your Hometown Country Station" overnights (12 a.m. - 6 a.m.)
- "Cody" (6 a.m. - 10 a.m.)
- "Radio Robin Keith" mid-days (10 a.m. - 3 p.m.)
- "Mark Ryan" (3 p.m. - 7 p.m.)
- "Jason" (7 p.m. - 12 a.m.)

=== Saturday ===
- "Your Hometown Country Station" overnights (12 a.m. - 6 a.m.)
- "Robin Keith" (6 a.m. - Noon)
- "Dale Jones" (Noon - 6 p.m.)
- "Cody" (6 p.m. - Midnight)

=== Sunday ===
- "Your Hometown Country Station" am hours (12 a.m. - 11 a.m.)
- "American Country Countdown" mid-days (11 a.m. - 3 p.m.)
- "Robin Keith" (3 p.m. - 8 p.m.)
- "American Country Countdown" evenings (8 p.m. - 12 a.m.)
