= Mass media in Peoria, Illinois =

This is a listing of the broadcasters and published media targeted at Peoria, Illinois. TV information includes cities where Peoria TV has been dominant, including Bloomington/Normal full-power TV, and LaSalle/Peru TV before cable TV.

== Radio ==
Start dates are for the frequency/station license, not for callsign or programming that may have moved from license to license.

=== FM ===
- 88.5 WBNH Peoria (Christian)
- 89.9 WCBU Peoria (NPR/talk)
- 90.7 WAZU Peoria (Hip-hop)
- 91.5 WCIC Pekin (Christian AC)
- 92.3 WZPW Peoria (Rhythmic CHR)
- 93.3 WPBG Peoria (Classic hits)
- 94.3 WPMJ Chillicothe (Catholic/EWTN/Covenant Network)
- 94.9 WAAG Galesburg (Country)
- 95.5 WGLO Pekin (Classic rock)
- 96.5 WHPI Farmington (Contemporary hit radio)
- 97.3 WFYR Elmwood (Country)
- 98.5 WPIA Eureka (Contemporary hit radio)
- 99.9 WWCT Bartonville (Adult album alternative)
- 100.5 WRVY-FM Henry (Country)
- 101.1 WZPN Glasford (Sports/ESPN)
- 101.5 WBNQ Bloomington (Contemporary hit radio)
- 102.3 WKZF Morton (Rhythmic classic hits)
- 102.9 WWKJ-LP Peoria
- 103.1 WXEC-LP Eureka (Alternative rock/Eureka College)
- 103.3 WLSE Canton (LifeTalk Radio)
- 104.9 WXCL Pekin (Country)
- 105.7 WIXO Peoria (Active rock)
- 106.3 WPNV-LP Peoria (Urban AC)
- 106.9 WSWT Peoria (Adult contemporary)
- 107.9 WPZA Canton (Christian music)

=== AM ===
- 1020 WPEO Peoria (Christian)*
- 1140 WVEL Pekin (Urban gospel)*
- 1290 WIRL Peoria (Conservative talk)
- 1350 WVBP Peoria (Urban adult contemporary)
- 1470 WMBD Peoria (Talk radio)
- 1560 WBYS Canton (Talk radio)

== Television ==
- 19 WHOI Peoria (Independent with MyNetworkTV)
- 25 WEEK-TV Peoria (NBC)
- 31 WMBD-TV Peoria (CBS)
- 43 WYZZ-TV Bloomington (Fox)
- 47 WTVP Peoria (PBS)
- 59 WTVK Pekin (Shop LC)

== Defunct ==
=== Radio ===
- 1580 WWXL (AM) Peoria (1947–?) — sister to 94.1 WWXL-FM; in 1948, was on the air on 1580, with a construction permit for 1590; gone by 1959
- 88.5 WECU Peoria (1990s) — on air around 1989; time-shared frequency with WBNH Pekin; eventually went off air, allowing WBNH to go full-time
- 93.3 WEEK-FM Peoria (c. 1948) — sister to 1350 WEEK (AM); not yet on air at start of 1948; already gone by 1959; frequency later used by WMBD-FM (93.3 WPBG); callsign later used by 98.5 Eureka
- 94.1 WWXL-FM Peoria (c. 1948) — sister to 1580 WWXL (AM); not yet on air at start of 1948; already gone by 1959; now unusable: adjacent 94.3 later allocated to Chillicothe (now WPMJ)
- 95.7 WIRL-FM Peoria (c. 1948) — not yet on air at start of 1948; already gone by 1959; now unusable: 95.3 Pekin allocation moved to adjacent 95.5 in 1980s with WGLO
- 96.5 WMMJ-FM Peoria (c. 1948) — construction permit as of 1948; already gone by 1959; 96.5 allocated to nearby Farmington in 1990s (now WHPI)
- 100.9 WBOD Canton (c. 1989) — not yet on air in 1989; likely never launched: adjacent 101.1 allocated to nearby Glasford in 1990s (now WZPN)

=== Low-power FM ===
- 103.1 WEUR-LP Eureka (c. 2001) — Likely never on air: Construction permit requested in August 2000 and issued 2001-06-27 to Eureka College; permit expired 2002-12-27 without license.
- 106.3 Eureka (c. 2014) — Likely never on air: Construction permit requested in November 2013 and issued in January 2014 to Faith Baptist Temple in Eureka; permit cancelled July 27, 2015 without license or callsign.

=== Peoria area low-power TV ===
- 16 W16AZ Lacon (c. 1994) — construction permit for Kelly Communications; expired in 1996 without being licensed
- 67 W67CW Peoria (1995–2005?) — M.C. Productions, 1101 S. "Mathew" St. and 1923 W. Lincoln Ave., 61605. Construction permit granted 1993-09-28; licensed 1995-06-29; application to move to channel 65 dismissed 1997-10-09; renewal on channel 67 on 1997-12-01; license expired 2005-12-01; deleted 2007-10-15.

=== Bloomington TV ===
- 15 WBLN Bloomington (1955?–1959?) — sold by Cecil W. Roberts to Worth S. Rough's WBLN TV Inc. on 13 July 1955; off the air but still holding permit in 1959; empty channel allocation moved to Champaign in 1967 for WICD; callsign reused by channel 43 from 1982 start until it became WYZZ-TV

=== Peoria TV in LaSalle-Peru ===
Until cable TV was common in the late 1970s, LaSalle/Peru received primarily Peoria television using television translators.

By March 1965, LaSalle, Spring Valley, and Peru already had CATV systems owned by The Television Transmission Company.

- 35 WEEQ LaSalle (1957–1970s?) — LaSalle's only full-power allocation, channel 35, started as WEEQ, a co-owned satellite of WEEK-TV Peoria (which was on 43 Peoria then on 25 Peoria); it was on the air as early as November 1957. Channel allocation used by WWTO since 1 December 1986.
- 71 W71AE (1964–1979?) — This carried co-owned 31 WMBD-TV Peoria. License granted 15 November 1962; A picture of the 485-foot (148 m) Rohn tower and its 16-bay antenna is shown in a Rohn advertisement in the 1 July 1963 issue of Broadcasting. Started around 1964. Renewed November 1971. WMBD-TV still shown as having "1 trans." in 1975 Yearbook. Guessed as deleted in 1979 in W9WI translator listing.
- 78 W78AC (1963–1964?) — This carried 19 WTVH Peoria (now WHOI) in the early 1960s. Listed in September 1962 TV Guide. License granted 18 February 1963. It was no longer in TV Guide by the end of 1964.

== Print ==
- The Community Word — monthly community newspaper that covers neighborhoods and local politics
- Numero — monthly entertainment guide
- Peoria Journal Star — daily newspaper
- Peoria Magazines group — includes Peoria Progress Plays, Art & Society, InterBusiness Issues, and the Peoria Woman
