= WXMP =

WXMP may refer to:

- WXMP-LP, a low-power radio station (106.5 FM) licensed to serve Cordova, Tennessee, United States
- WZPN, a radio station (101.1 FM) licensed to serve Glasford, Illinois, United States, which held the call sign WXMP from 2006 to 2007
- WIXO, a radio station (105.7 FM) licensed to serve Peoria, Illinois, which held the call sign WXMP from 2003 to 2006
- WHPI, a radio station (96.5 FM) licensed to serve Farmington, Illinois, which held the call sign WXMP in 2003
