= KISS 98.5 =

KISS 98.5 may refer to:

- WKSE, a radio station in the Buffalo, NY market
- WPIA, a radio station in the Peoria, IL market
