= WRIA =

WRIA may refer to:

- WRIA-LP, a defunct low-power FM radio station (95.7 MHz) licensed to serve Jacksonville, Florida, United States
- WHPI, an FM radio station (96.5 MHz) licensed to serve Farmington, Illinois, United States, which held the call sign WRIA from 2006 to 2007
- Winnipeg Richardson International Airport, a International airport located in Winnipeg
