= WZPN =

Radio station in Glasford–Peoria, Illinois

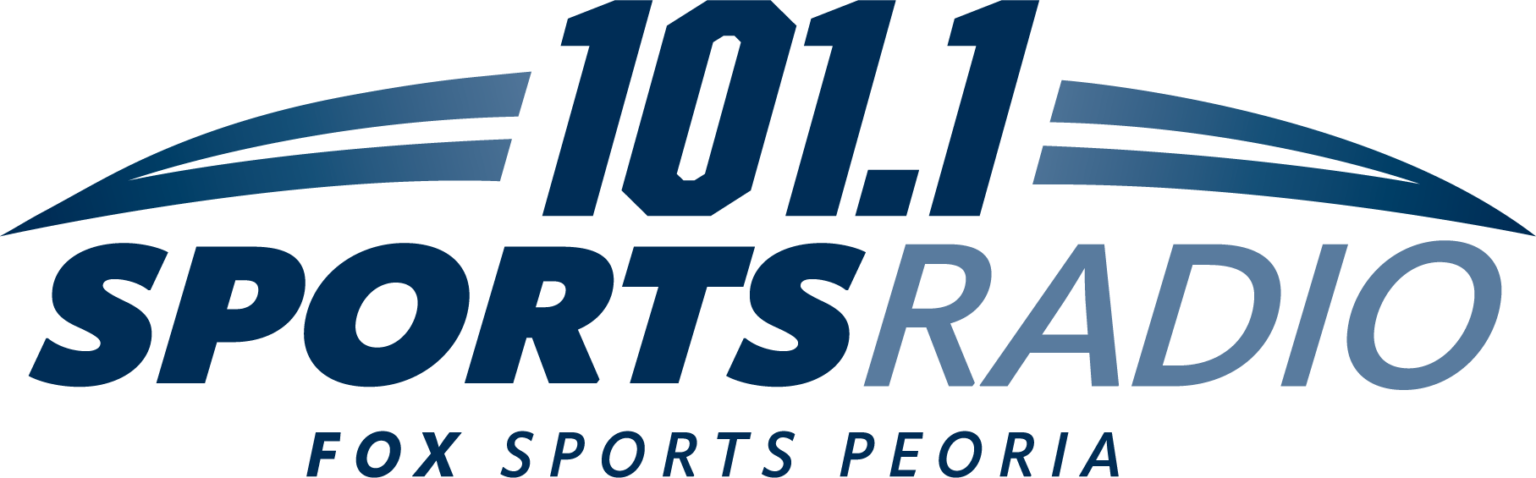
- Glasford, Illinois; United States
- Broadcast area: Peoria, Illinois
- Frequency: 101.1 MHz
- Branding: Peoria Sports Radio

Programming
- Format: Sports
- Affiliations: Fox Sports Radio

Ownership
- Owner: Mike and Ann Rea; (Advanced Media Partners LLC)
- Sister stations: WHPI; WPIA; WWCT

History
- First air date: 1998
- Former call signs: WBDM (1998–1999); WRVP (1999–2000); WPPY (2000–2004); WVEL-FM (2004–2006); WXMP (2006–2007); WHPI (2007–2018)
- Call sign meaning: Station was previously affiliated with ESPN Radio

Technical information
- Licensing authority: FCC
- Facility ID: 78165
- Class: A
- ERP: 3,300 watts
- HAAT: 137 meters (449 ft)
- Transmitter coordinates: 40°39′0.1″N 89°46′46.4″W (NAD83)

Links
- Public license information: Public file; LMS
- Webcast: Listen Live
- Website: peoriasportsradio.com

WZPN (101.1 MHz, "Peoria Sports Radio") is a radio station for Glasford, Illinois in the Peoria, Illinois radio market. From September 26, 2010 to June 6, 2018, the station aired the adult hits format Jack FM, before becoming a sports radio station as an affiliate of ESPN Radio, then shifting to Fox Sports Radio on June 1, 2023.

== History ==
Neil A. Rhones and Luann C. Dahl applied for a new station on 101.1 MHz at Canton, Illinois, and were granted a construction permit in 1996. The call sign WBDM was assigned to this station. In 1997, Rhones and Dahl asked the Federal Communications Commission to move Canton's 101.1 MHz allocation, with their construction permit, to Glasford, Illinois, claiming that moving the city of license would result in adding 81,024 people to the coverage area while only losing 8,754. The FCC granted the request on August 26, 1996. In June 1999, Rhones and Dahl assigned their construction permit to Two Petaz, Inc., which was based in Nashville, Tennessee and whose president was Bargard H. Walters. The station's call sign was changed to WRVP on July 13, 1999 and the station received its license on January 4, 2000.

The station used the nickname "101.1 The River". The River was born as an adult contemporary station and was attempting to compete with heritage 50 kW signal WSWT. This did not last long; just a few months later, the plug was pulled in favor of a simulcast of sister station 98.5 as "98.5 & 101.1 The Party". 98.5 WPPY and 101.1 swapped call signs on July 27, 2000.

In March 2004, 101.1 began simulcasting WVEL (AM), which has long suffered from a weak signal outside of Pekin. As part of the simulcast, 101.1 dropped the WPPY call sign in favor of WVEL-FM.

In September 2006, as part of a larger station swap between multiple Peoria groups, Regent Broadcasting sold 101.1 to newly formed Independence Media Holdings. 105.7 was being sold from AAA Entertainment to Regent, and Regent indicated it did not want the Hot AC format currently on 105.7. On September 26, 2006, "Mix 105.7" (WXMP) and its format moved to the weaker 101.1 frequency and changed its name to "Mix 101.1", while the WIXO callsign and the "99X Rocks" format moved from 99.9 to 105.7.

At midnight on September 19, 2007, the station changed its format to Oldies, branded as "Hippie Radio 101.1". The call sign was changed to WHPI to match the "Hippie" moniker.

At 9:45 p.m. on September 26, 2010, WHPI changed its format to adult hits, branded as "Jack FM". WHPI remained jockless for the majority of its history after the "Jack FM" format signed on, only adding a local morning show in 2017.

Independence Media Holdings sold WHPI along with its other three Peoria-area stations (WZPN, WPIA, and WWCT) to Michael S. Rea's Advanced Media Partners on November 15, 2010.

On June 6, 2018, at 3 p.m., Jack announced he had "gone to find himself in Tahiti", and at that point, 101.1 became the new primary station for ESPN Radio in the Peoria market, with 96.5 serving as the simulcast until a new format for the latter is planned. The two stations rebranded together as "ESPN Peoria". On June 26, the two frequencies swapped call signs, with WHPI moving to 96.5 FM and WZPN moving to 101.1 FM. During that time, the station's website was changed to a redirect to 96.5's web address.

The sports format moved to 101.1 permanently on September 5, 2020, at midnight.

On June 1, 2023, the station shifted to a Fox Sports Radio affiliation as "Peoria Sports Radio". With the rebranding, the station expanded the afternoon drive “Jim Mattson Show with Mike Rizzo” from two to four hours, running from 2-6pm; previously, the duo hosted from 3-5pm with Rizzo hosting a solo hour at 5:00.

== Previous logos ==
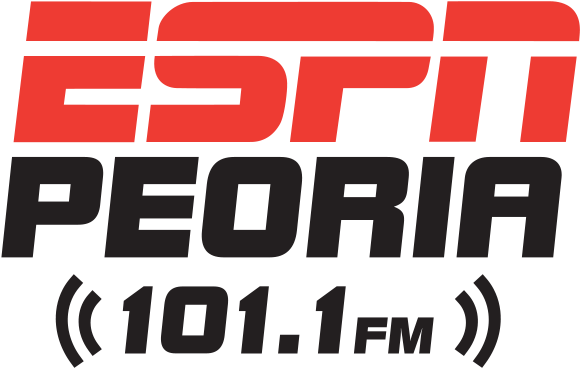
