= School District 68 =

School District 68 may refer to:

- Oak Grove School District 68 (Bartonville, Illinois), with two primary schools in Peoria County
- Oak Grove School District 68 (Lake County, Illinois), with one primary school in Oak Grove
- Skokie School District 68
- Woodridge School District 68
