= Limestone Community High School District 310 =

High school district in Bartonville, Illinois, USA

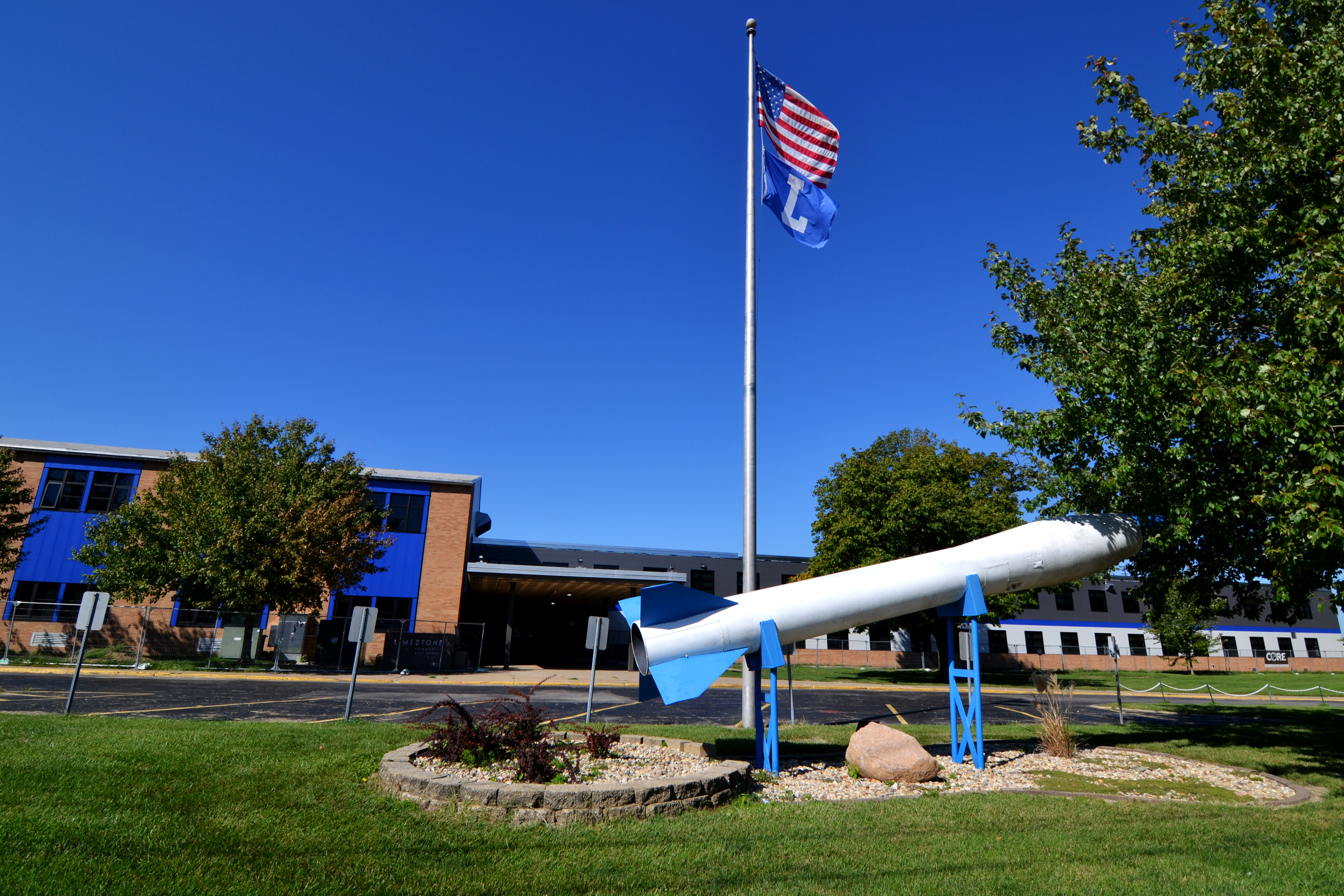
- Limestone Community High School front entrance on Airport Road

Address
- 4201 Airport Road Peoria, Illinois, 61607; United States
- Coordinates: 40°38′21″N 89°40′54″W

District information
- Type: Public
- Grades: 9–12
- Superintendent: Keith Brown
- NCES District ID: 1722950

Students and staff
- Students: 949
- Teachers: 67.29
- Student–teacher ratio: 14.10
- District mascot: Rockets
- Colors: Royal blue and white

Other information
- Website: www.limestone310.org

Limestone Community High School is a public high school in Bartonville, Peoria County, Illinois. As of 2017, the school had an average enrollment of 867 students and average full-time equivalent of 70 teachers.

Limestone Community High School is the only general high school of Limestone Community High School District 310; the district also operates the high school program of the Peoria County Juvenile Detention Center.

The district includes portions of Peoria County, covering Bellevue, Norwood, most of Bartonville, and parts of Pekin, Peoria, and West Peoria.

== History ==
Before the 1950s, Bartonville had no high school of its own; students went to Pekin or Peoria, and their expenses were paid for by a non-high-school district, but without control over the schools the students were attending. Consolidating with other school districts was considered, but it was determined that joining Peoria Public Schools District 150 would require annexation into the city of Peoria, and that neither the Elmwood or the Glasford school districts had the capacity to take on the 570 students in the area. A group of educators and other citizens decided that the only solution was to build a high school.

A public election on February 5, 1949, voted District 310 into existence; and, on March 14, the board of education first met and elected its officers.

Limestone Community High School opened on October 14, 1953. It was annexed into the village of Bartonville in June 1957.

== Notable alumni ==
- Mike Dunne — Major League Baseball player; played in 1984 Los Angeles Olympics
- Jim Thome — former Major League Baseball player who played 22 seasons from 1991 to 2012 and is in the Baseball Hall of Fame
