= Oak Grove School District 68 (Bartonville, Illinois) =

School district in Illinois, United States

Address
- 6018 West Lancaster Road Bartonville, Illinois, 61607; United States
- Coordinates: 40°38′12.1″N 89°41′16.4″W

District information
- Type: Public
- Grades: PreK–8
- NCES District ID: 1729100

Students and staff
- Students: 267

Other information
- Website: www.og68.org

Oak Grove School District 68 is a primary school district in Peoria County, Illinois. It receives students from portions of Bartonville and rural Peoria County. District 68 feeds into Limestone Community High School District 310.

Until 2017, the district had two schools, both in Bartonville: Oak Grove East for kindergarten and lower grades, and Oak Grove West, a junior high school for upper grades. For the 2017–2018 school year, the schools were combined as Oak Grove School. As of 2022, the district had around 263 students and 23 teachers, down from around 410 students and 50 staff in 2010.
