= Illini Bluffs High School =

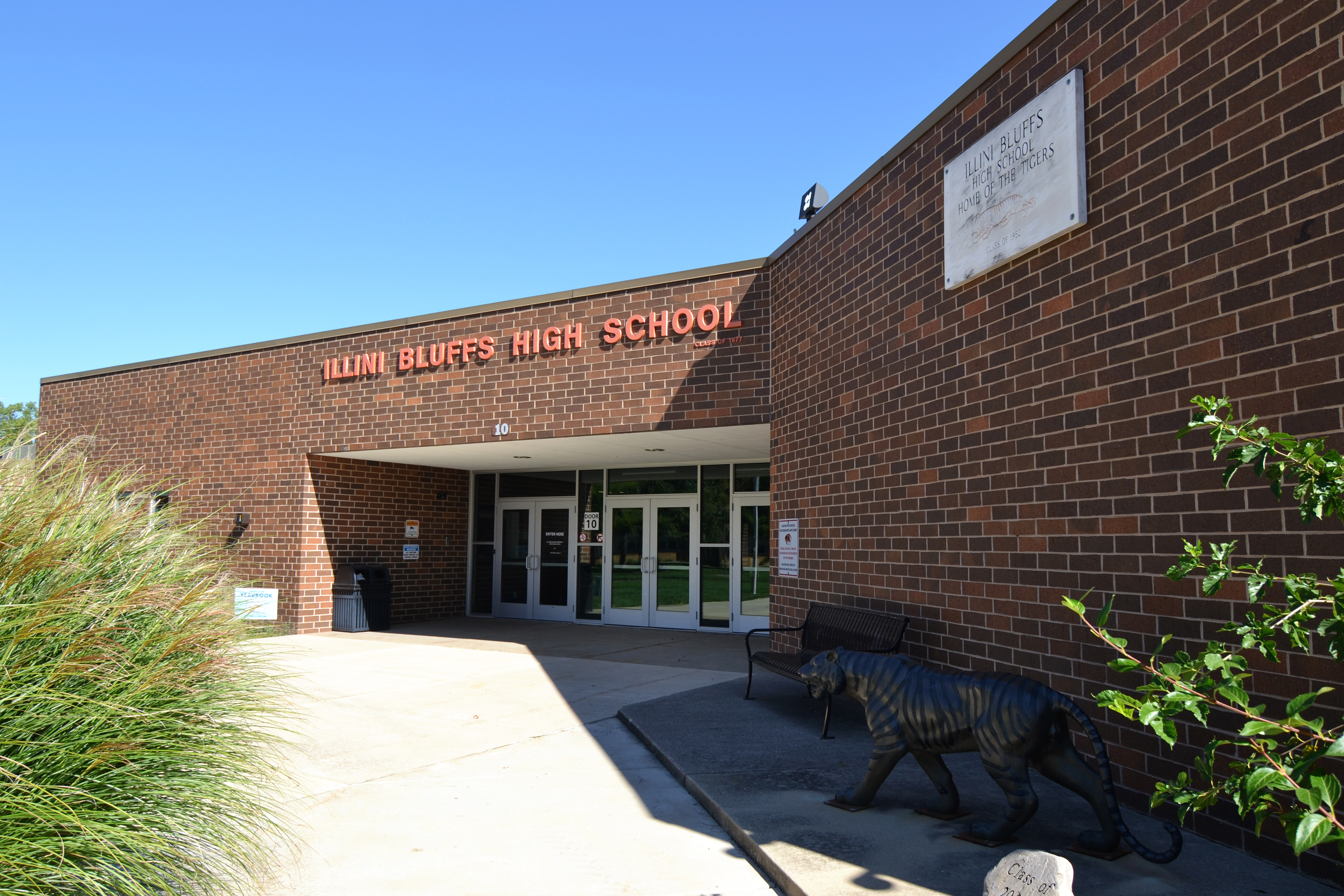
- Illini Bluffs High School Building

Location
- 9611 S Hanna City-Glasford Road; Glasford, Peoria County, Illinois 61533; United States
- Coordinates: 40.5739°N 89.8089°W

Information
- Former name: Timber Township High School
- Type: Comprehensive Public High School
- School district: Illini Bluffs Community Unit School District 327
- Superintendent: Dimitri Almasi
- Principal: Josiah Martin
- Teaching staff: 24.15 (FTE)
- Grades: 9–12
- Enrollment: 255 (2023-2024)
- Student to teacher ratio: 10.56
- Campus type: Rural, fringe
- Colors: Orange, Black
- Athletics conference: Tomahawk; Inter County Athletic
- Mascot: Tigers
- Yearbook: Tiger Tracks
- Website: Illini Bluffs High School Website

Illini Bluffs High School, or IBHS, is a public four-year high school located at 212 North Saylor Street in Glasford, Illinois, a village in Peoria County, Illinois, in the Midwestern United States. IBHS serves the communities of Glasford, Kingston Mines, and Mapleton. The campus is located 15 miles southwest of Peoria, Illinois, and serves a mixed village and rural residential community.

== History ==
Illini Bluffs High School was formed out of the consolidation of Glasford, Kingston Mines, and Mapleton schools at some point in the 1900s. Surrounding communities may have also possessed high schools at some time which were consolidated into the current IBHS. Potential reference/citation:

Timber Township High School District #159 was formed in 1916. The first graduating class of 29 students took place in 1918.

In 1922, several rural schoolhouses in Glasford and Kingston Mines were consolidated into one district, Consolidated District #205. In 1944 to 1948, additional schools were added to the district from Hollis, Limestone, and Logan townships.

In 1969-1970, Timber Township High School #159 combined with District #205 and other area schools (Lancaster, Mapleton, Westwood, Wheeler) to become Illini Bluffs Unit School District #327.

== Academics ==
Potential reference/citation:

== Athletics ==
Illini Bluffs High School competes in the Tomahawk Conference and also the Inter County Athletic Conference as a member school in the Illinois High School Association.

Their mascot is the Tigers, with school colors of orange and black. The school has no state championships on record in team athletics and activities however the school has had many state championships in individual sports and activities.

The district has 3 full-size indoor gyms and an outdoor athletic complex with an all-weather track, baseball/softball diamonds, and soccer fields.

Boys' Sports:

- Baseball
- Basketball
- Cross Country
- Golf
- Soccer
- Wrestling

Girls' Sports:

- Basketball
- Cheerleading / Competitive Cheerleading
- Softball
- Volleyball

Co-Ed Sports:

- Cross Country
- Scholastic Bowl
- Track And Field
