= WWCT =

Radio station in Bartonville–Peoria, Illinois

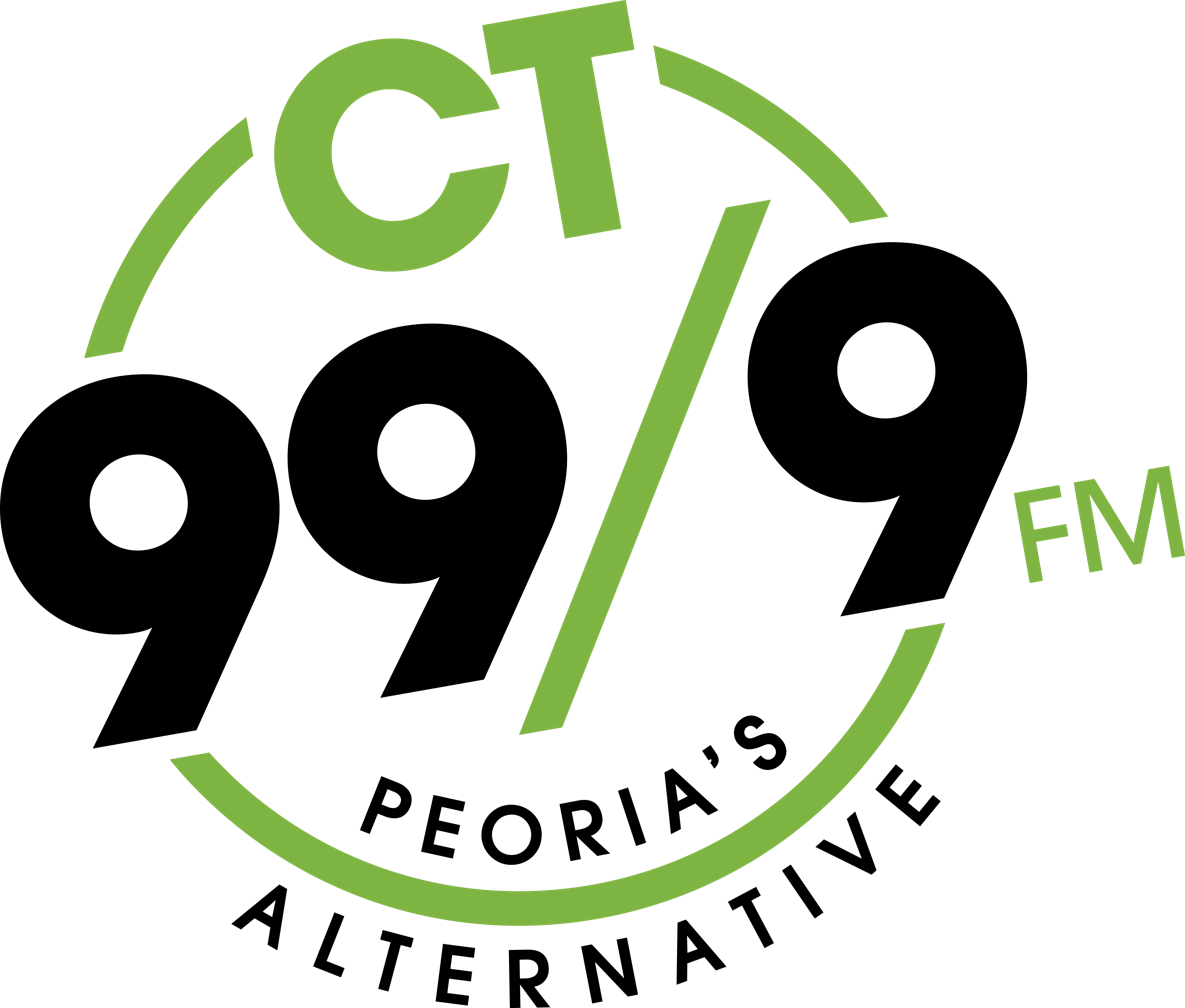

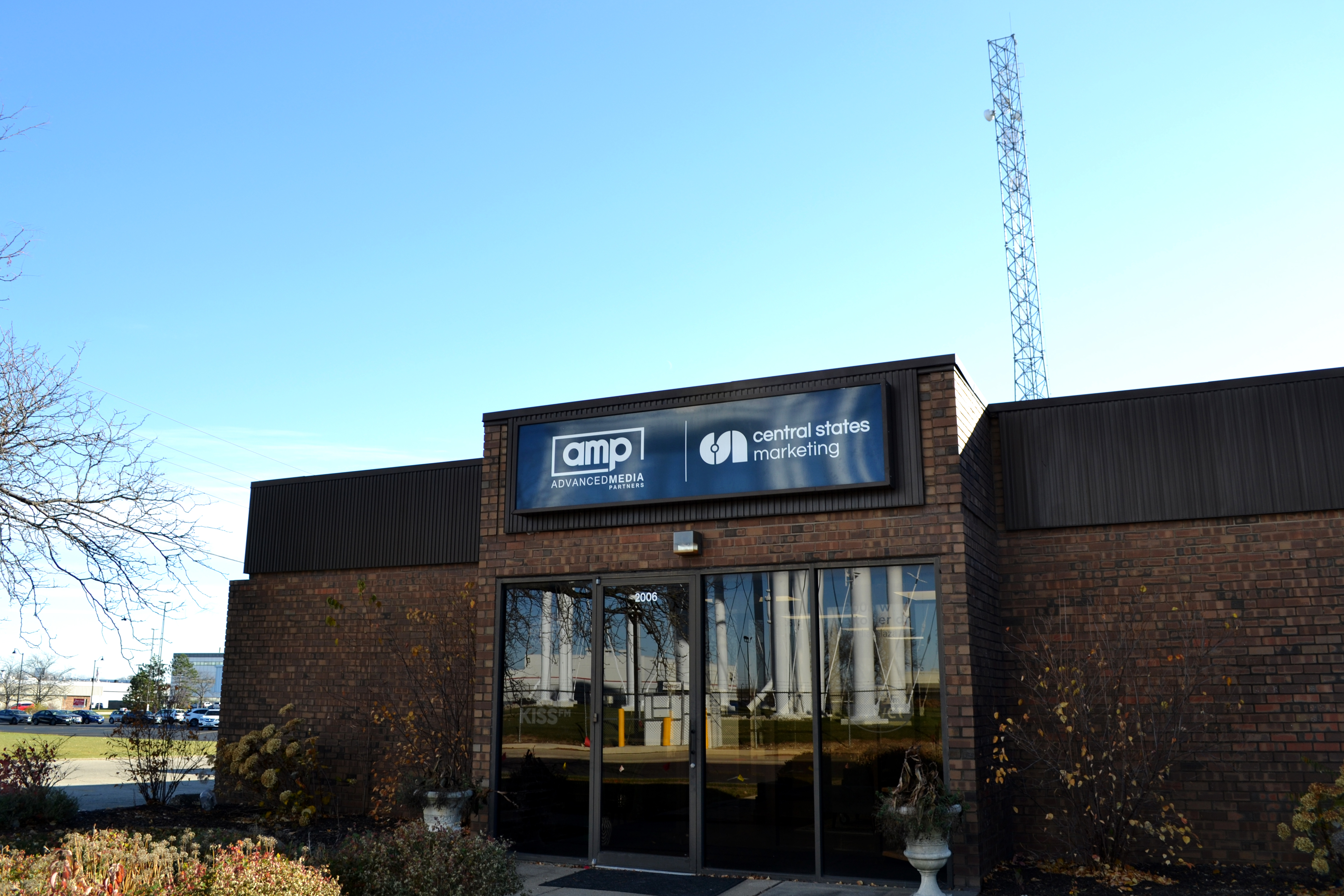
- Studio in Peoria
- Bartonville, Illinois; United States
- Broadcast area: Peoria, Illinois
- Frequency: 99.9 MHz
- Branding: CT 99.9

Programming
- Format: Alternative rock

Ownership
- Owner: Mike Rea; (Advanced Media Partners, LLC)
- Sister stations: WHPI, WPIA, WZPN

History
- First air date: 1970s (original WWTO on 105.7); 1996 (original 99.9 as WIXO)
- Former call signs: WIXO (1996–September 18, 2006); WRXP (September 19–28, 2006)

Technical information
- Licensing authority: FCC
- Facility ID: 27727
- Class: A
- ERP: 1,500 watts
- HAAT: 178 meters (584 ft)
- Transmitter coordinates: 40°36′23.1″N 89°32′20.4″W (NAD83)

Links
- Public license information: Public file; LMS
- Webcast: Listen Live
- Website: www.wwctfm.com

WWCT (99.9 FM) is a radio station licensed to Bartonville, Illinois. Through most of its history, the WWCT callsign was associated with Peoria's 105.7 frequency allocation; the call sign and related format was moved to 96.5 (Farmington) in 2003, then 99.9 (Bartonville) in 2006. The original 99.9 callsign, WIXO, and its music format, had moved to 105.7 in 2006.

== History ==
=== 105.7 ===
The original 105.7 was operating as WWTO in the early 1970s. In 1976, the station changed its callsign to WWCT and made its debut as an album rock station. Calling itself simply "106" or "WWCT" early on, by the 1990s, it was using the nickname "Rock 106". Locally owned until the 1990s, the station was then sold to AAA Entertainment. AAA gave the station the new nickname "Rock 105.7", then "Rock 96.5" when it moved the format to the Farmington-licensed frequency.

=== 96.5 ===
WWCT was moved to 96.5 in 2003 by AAA to make room for its new WXMP "Mix 105.7" on the more powerful signal. In January 2006, WWCT switched to an all-request Rock format, which it maintained until it was shut down on September 20, 2006 after being sold to Independence Media. Independence Media flipped the format to Top 40/CHR, named "98.5 Kiss FM", and launched a simulcast on 96.5 (changed to WRIA) and also on 98.5 (WPIA), which had been Christian music station "Hope 98.5". 96.5 is now WHPI, a simulcast of sister station WPIA.

=== 99.9 ===
What is now WWCT signed on August 2, 1996 as WIXO, originally stunting with loops of "Macarena" by Los Del Rio. On February 21, 1997 at 6 p.m., the station flipped to an alternative rock format as "99X". The WIXO call letters would move to 105.7 FM in September 2006.

Independence Media, who had also bought the license for 99.9, replaced its 10-day-old callsign WRXP with the current callsign WWCT on September 29, 2006, but kept the nickname 99.9 Pirate Radio.

On or around Sunday, April 8, 2007, the Pirate Radio moniker was dropped in favor of CT 99-dot-9. The slogan was changed to "World Class Rock" and the size of the playlist increased greatly, cutting a wide swath across many different genres and eras of music. On April 11, 2008, the station temporarily dropped the adult album alternative format it had been running with the slogan "World Class Rock" and began stunting; it then returned on April 15 with the new name 99.9 The Stage.

2008–2010 logo

On September 15, 2008, after three days of stunting, the station became alternative rock station 99.9 The Buzz, and began carrying the Lex and Terry morning show from KEGL in Dallas. The station was commercial-free from 10 a.m. to Noon.

The station was turned over to Michael S. Rea through Advanced Media Partners on August 1, 2010, in anticipation of the station being purchased; since then, the station has run a format of mixed popular music. On September 26, the station flipped back to adult album alternative after many weeks of stunting. The sale of WWCT, along with its other three Peoria-area stations (WZPN, WPIA, and WHPI), was completed on November 15.

2020–2024 logo

On or around November 1, 2020, WWCT rebranded as CT 99.9, and adopted the slogan "Listen Different".

On May 24, 2024, WWCT changed their format from adult album alternative to alternative rock, still under the "CT 99.9" branding. With the new branding came a new logo.
