= E.D. Edwards Power Plant =

Coal power plant located on the Illinois River

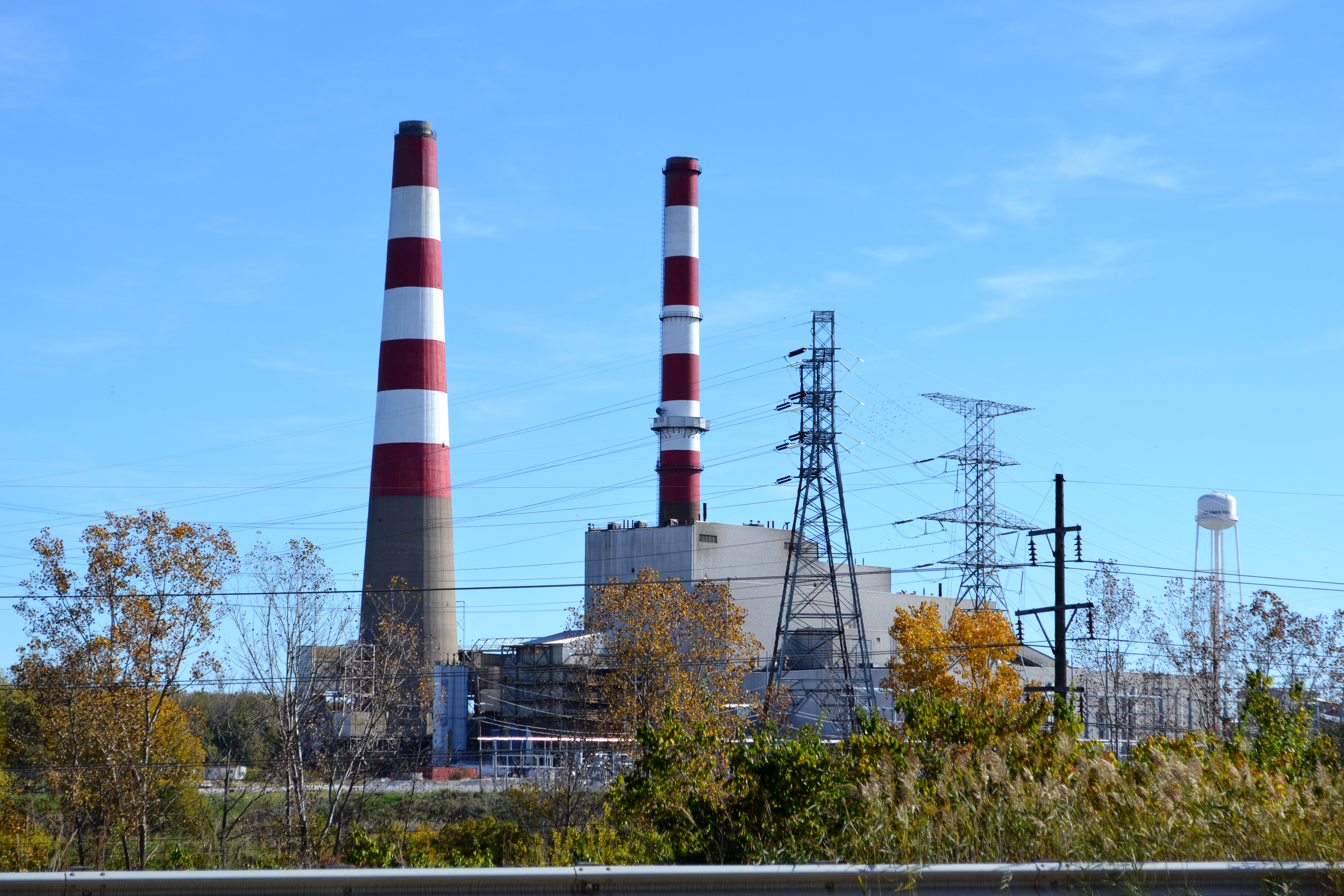
- View of smokestacks from US Route 24
- Country: United States
- Coordinates: 40°35′44″N 89°39′47″W
- Status: Decommissioned
- Decommission date: December 2022

Power generation
- Nameplate capacity: 644.3 MW; 780.3 MW

The E.D. Edwards Power Plant is an inoperative coal-fired generating plant owned by Vistra Energy. The plant, with a nameplate capacity of 780 megawatts, was connected with the high-tension power supply lines of Central Illinois. It is located on the Illinois River and the Union Pacific Railroad, adjacent to the municipality of Bartonville.

The Edwards plant, built by the former Central Illinois Light Company (CILCO), began operations in 1960. Ameren owned the plant until it was acquired by Dynegy in 2013. Dynegy was purchased by Vistra Energy in April 2018.

== Closure ==
Starting in 2013, environmental groups headed by the Sierra Club and the Natural Resources Defense Council took legal action to shut down the power plant. The groups asserted that the plant generated illegal levels of coal dust particulates and was nearing the end of its useful life. The groups filed a Clean Air Act lawsuit.

Unit 1 of the plant was retired in December 2015. Unit 2 came online in 1968 and Unit 3 came online in 1972.

In line with the terms of a settlement announced in September 2019 and approved by a federal court in November 2019, the plant was scheduled to close no later than December 31, 2022. The closure was expected to affect 70 jobs. The settlement also provided for $8.6 million in grants funding for workforce training and development, public health, and environmental projects to benefit local communities.

As of January 2023, the coal-powered portions of the site were officially closed. Vistra Energy is currently transitioning the site to electric battery storage. The renewed plant would create 88 jobs.
