= Glasford crater =

Impact crater in Illinois

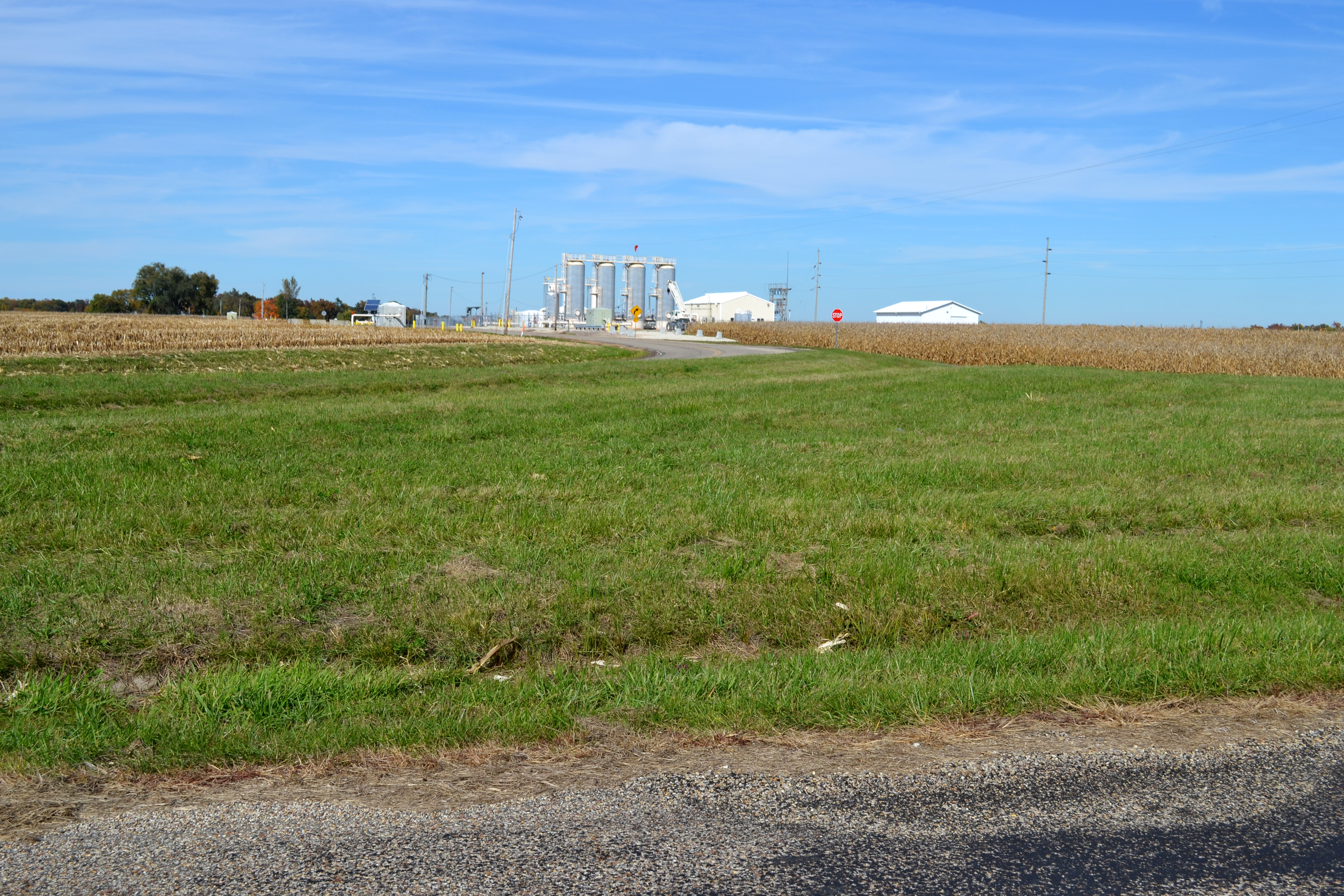
- Site of crater from south, at intersection of Cowser and Kingston Mines Rds.

- Location within Illinois
- Location: Illinois, Glasford, Illinois, Illinois, USA; 40°36′N 89°47′W

Impact crater structure
- Confidence: Confirmed
- Diameter: 4 kilometres (2.5 mi)
- Depth: 350 metres (1,150 ft)
- Age: < 430 Ma
- Exposed: No
- Drilled: Yes

The Glasford crater, also known as the Glasford Disturbance, Glasford Structure, and Glasford Cryptoexplosion Structure, is a buried impact crater in southern Peoria County, Illinois, in the United States. It is one of two known meteor craters in Illinois.

It is 4 kilometers (2.5 mi) in diameter and the age is estimated to be less than 430 million years (Silurian or younger). It was formed in a marine environment in the Late Ordovician period. The meteorite is estimated between 50 and 90 million tons and likely originated in the asteroid belt between Mars and Jupiter.

The Glasford crater was discovered by the Central Illinois Light Company (formerly CILCO, now Ameren) while drilling wells for underground natural gas storage. It is not visible from the surface, as it is covered by agricultural farmland. The present day location is near the intersection of Cowser and Kingston Mines roads. It was identified in 1963 as a probable impact structure. In the 1980s, scientists identified shatter cones. Geologists estimate the meteor released a large amount of energy, roughly equivalent to 20,000 nuclear bombs, 460 million tons of TNT, or two to three times the energy of the Mount St. Helens eruption.

According to research by geologist Charles Monson, the Glasford crater may be connected to the Great Ordovician Meteor Shower. Dr. Birger Schmitz's study suggests that the dust from the meteor impact may have impacted Earth's climate and contributed to the mid-Ordovician Ice Age.
