= WGLO =

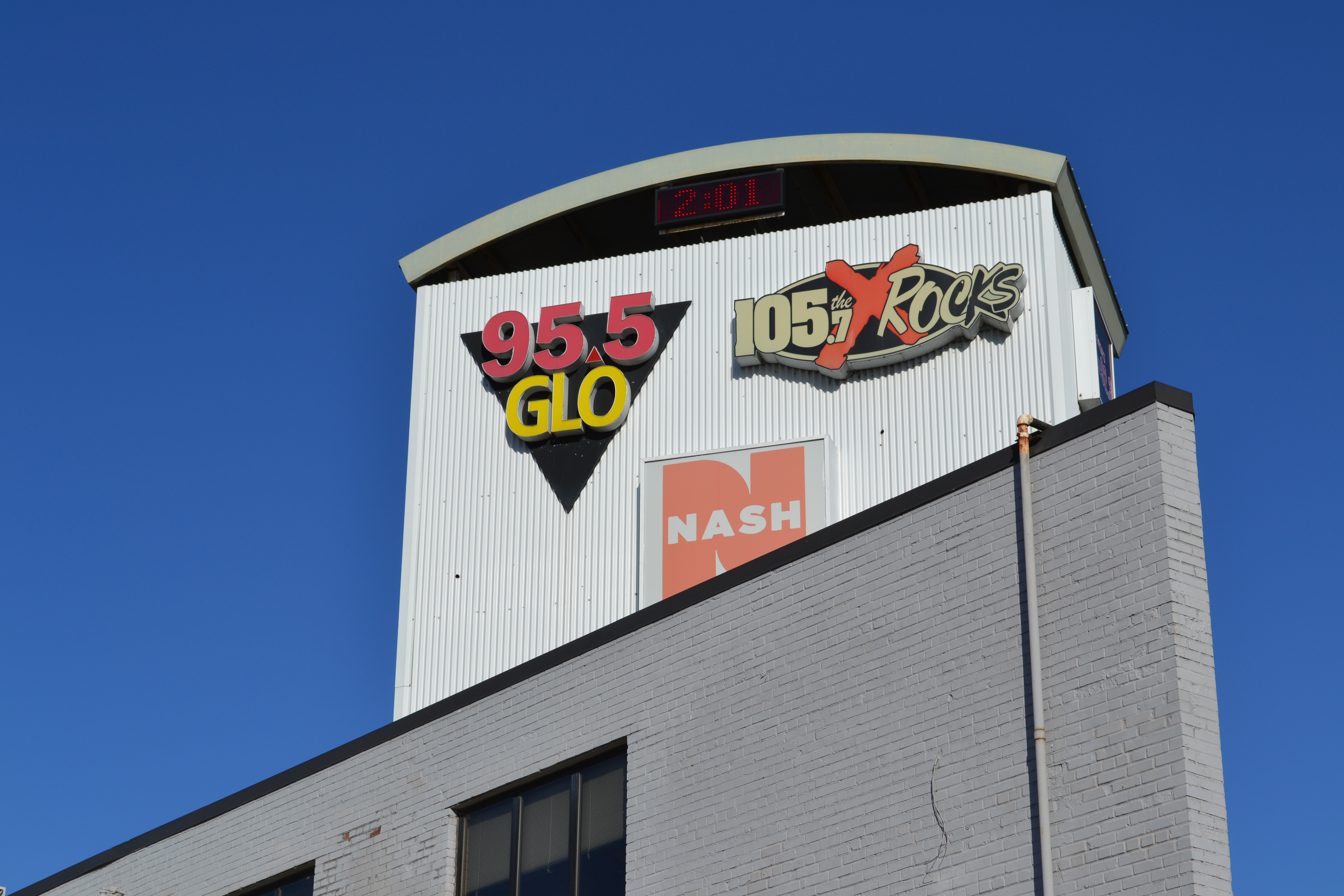
- Studio in downtown Peoria

Pekin, Illinois; United States
- Broadcast area: Peoria metropolitan area
- Frequency: 95.5 MHz
- Branding: 95.5 GLO

Programming
- Format: Classic rock
- Affiliations: Compass Media Networks; United Stations Radio Networks; Westwood One

Ownership
- Owner: Cumulus Media; (Radio License Holding CBC, LLC)
- Sister stations: WFYR, WIXO, WVEL, WZPW

History
- First air date: December 4, 1964
- Former call signs: WSIV-FM (1964–1979)
- Former frequencies: 95.3 MHz (1964–1979)

Technical information
- Licensing authority: FCC
- Facility ID: 68622
- Class: B1
- ERP: 7,000 watts
- HAAT: 189 meters (620 ft)
- Transmitter coordinates: 40°36′23″N 89°32′20″W

Links
- Public license information: Public file; LMS
- Webcast: Listen live
- Website: 955glo.com

WGLO (95.5 FM, "95.5 GLO") is a commercial radio station licensed to Pekin, Illinois, United States, and serving the Peoria metropolitan area. The station is owned by Cumulus Media, and broadcasts a classic rock format. The radio studios and offices are on Eaton Street in Peoria. WGLO is an affiliate of the syndicated Bob & Tom Show in morning drive time.

== History ==
The station signed on the air on December 4, 1964. Its original call sign was WSIV-FM, a sister station to WSIV 1140 AM. That station is now WVEL. WSIV-FM broadcast on 95.3 MHz, later moving to 95.5 MHz.

The station was assigned the WGLO call sign by the Federal Communications Commission on January 2, 1979.

The station featured an easy listening format prior to the switch to classic rock in 1998. Before being acquired by Cumulus Media in 2012, WGLO was owned by Townsquare Media.
