= WFYR =

Country music radio station in Elmwood, Illinois, United States

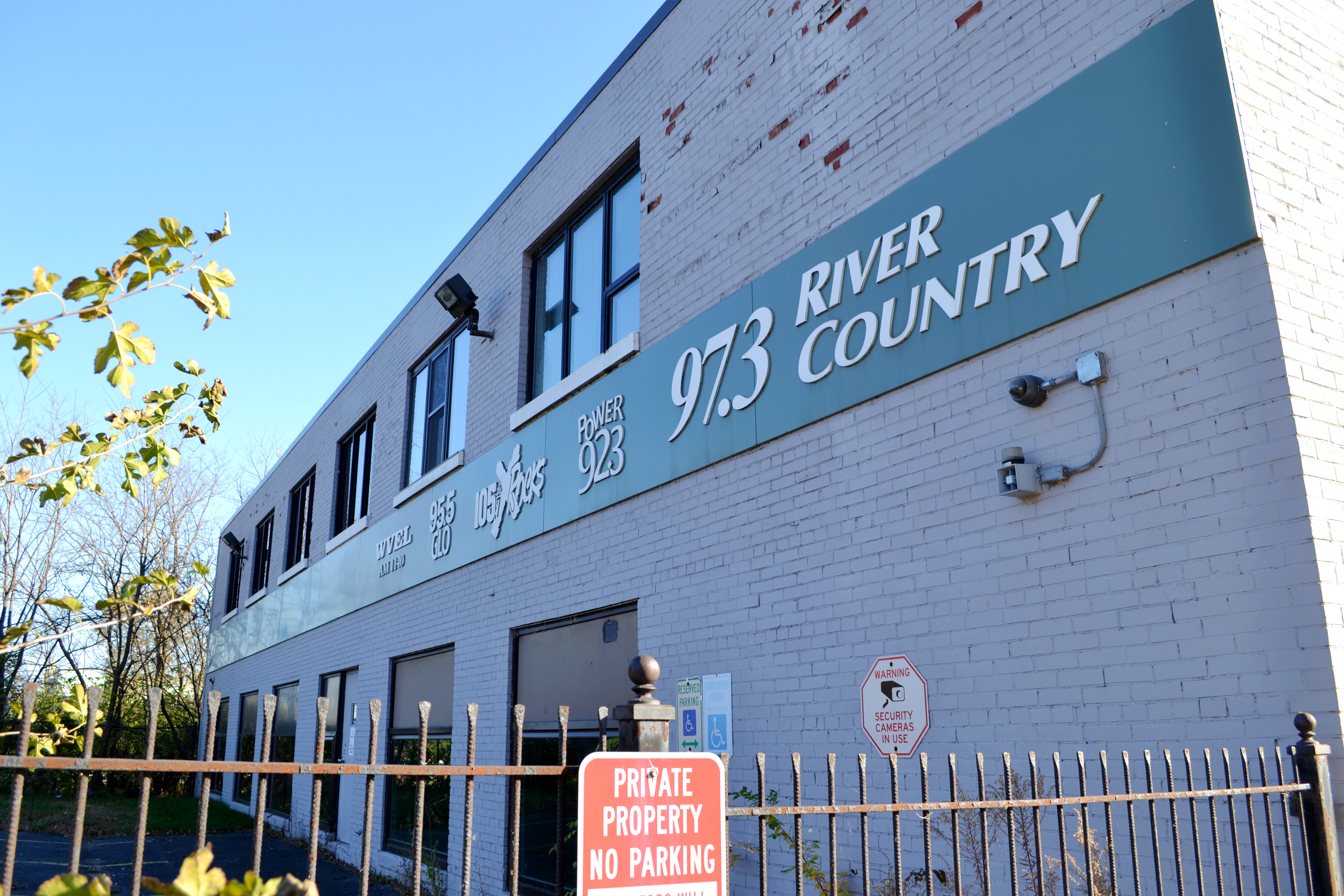
- Studio in downtown Peoria
- Elmwood, Illinois; United States
- Broadcast area: Peoria, Illinois
- Frequency: 97.3 MHz
- Branding: 97.3 River Country

Programming
- Format: Country music
- Affiliations: Compass Media Networks; Westwood One

Ownership
- Owner: Cumulus Media; (Radio License Holding CBC, LLC)
- Sister stations: WGLO, WIXO, WVEL, WZPW

History
- First air date: August 2, 1993; 32 years ago
- Call sign meaning: "Fire" (station's original moniker, Fire 97.3)

Technical information
- Licensing authority: FCC
- Facility ID: 72080
- Class: B1
- ERP: 23,500 watts
- HAAT: 103 meters (338 ft)
- Transmitter coordinates: 40°46′22.1″N 89°44′50.4″W (NAD83)

Links
- Public license information: Public file; LMS
- Webcast: Listen live Listen Live (iHeart)
- Website: 973rivercountry.com

WFYR (97.3 FM) is a radio station broadcasting a country music format and licensed for Elmwood, Illinois, United States, in the Peoria area. The station is owned by Cumulus Media, which purchased the station from Townsquare Media.

== History ==
Ever since the station signed on on August 2, 1993, it has always aired a country format. At first, WFYR used the branding "Fire 97", while using the Jones Satellite Networks' CD Country format on the air. The first local personality on the station was Program Director/Morning Host Dr Chris Michaels (now at competitor WXCL). The second air talent added locally in 1996 was Robb Rose to Afternoon Drive/Promotions Director. In the early-2000s, it was changed to "97.3 River Country". From September 6, 2013, to February 2, 2020, it used the nationally syndicated "Nash FM" branding.

Today, they are known for boosting local country music artists, with a weekly feature. From 2013 to 2020, the station competed in the Nash Next National Competition.

On February 3, 2020, WFYR rebranded back to its previous identity as "97.3 River Country."

== Previous logo ==
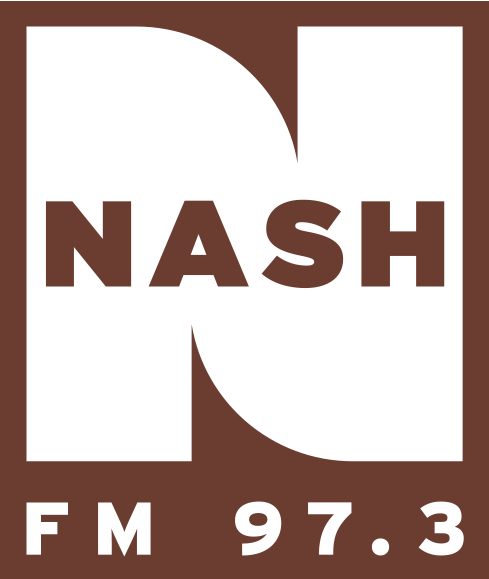
