= WBNH (FM) =

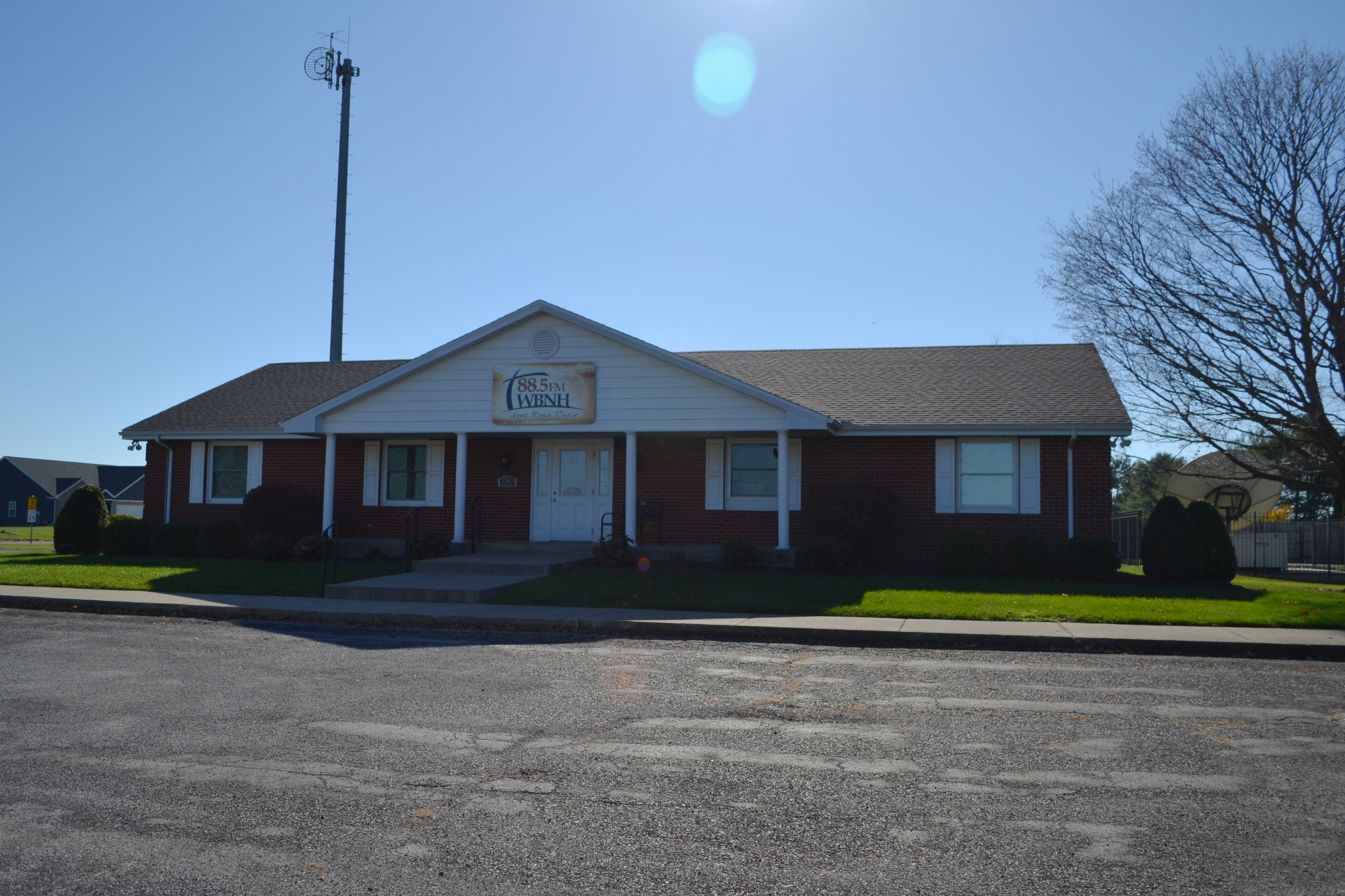
- WBNH studio, 2023
- Pekin, Illinois; United States
- Broadcast area: Peoria, Illinois
- Frequency: 88.5 MHz

Programming
- Format: Christian
- Affiliations: Moody

Ownership
- Owner: Central Illinois Radio Fellowship

History
- First air date: 1988
- Call sign meaning: "We're Bringing News of Him"

Technical information
- Licensing authority: FCC
- Facility ID: 9893
- Class: B
- ERP: 48,000 watts
- HAAT: 154 m (505 ft)
- Transmitter coordinates: 40°38′53.1″N 89°33′26.3″W

Links
- Public license information: Public file; LMS
- Webcast: Listen Live
- Website: www.wbnh.org

WBNH (88.5 FM) is a Christian radio station with a license for Pekin, Illinois. WBNH is a primary affiliate of the Moody Broadcasting Network and broadcasts Christian music and talk and programs. It is owned by the Central Illinois Radio Fellowship, and its studio is in Pekin.

== Translators ==
In addition to the main station, WBNH is relayed by an additional translator to widen its broadcast area.

Call sign	Frequency	City of license	FID	ERP (W)	HAAT	Class	Transmitter coordinates	FCC info
W261BK	100.1 FM	Bloomington, Illinois	9897	19	92.3 m (303 ft)	D	40°28′59.1″N 88°59′43.3″W	LMS
