= WZPW =

Radio station in Peoria, Illinois

Coordinates: 40.7861°N 89.7837°W

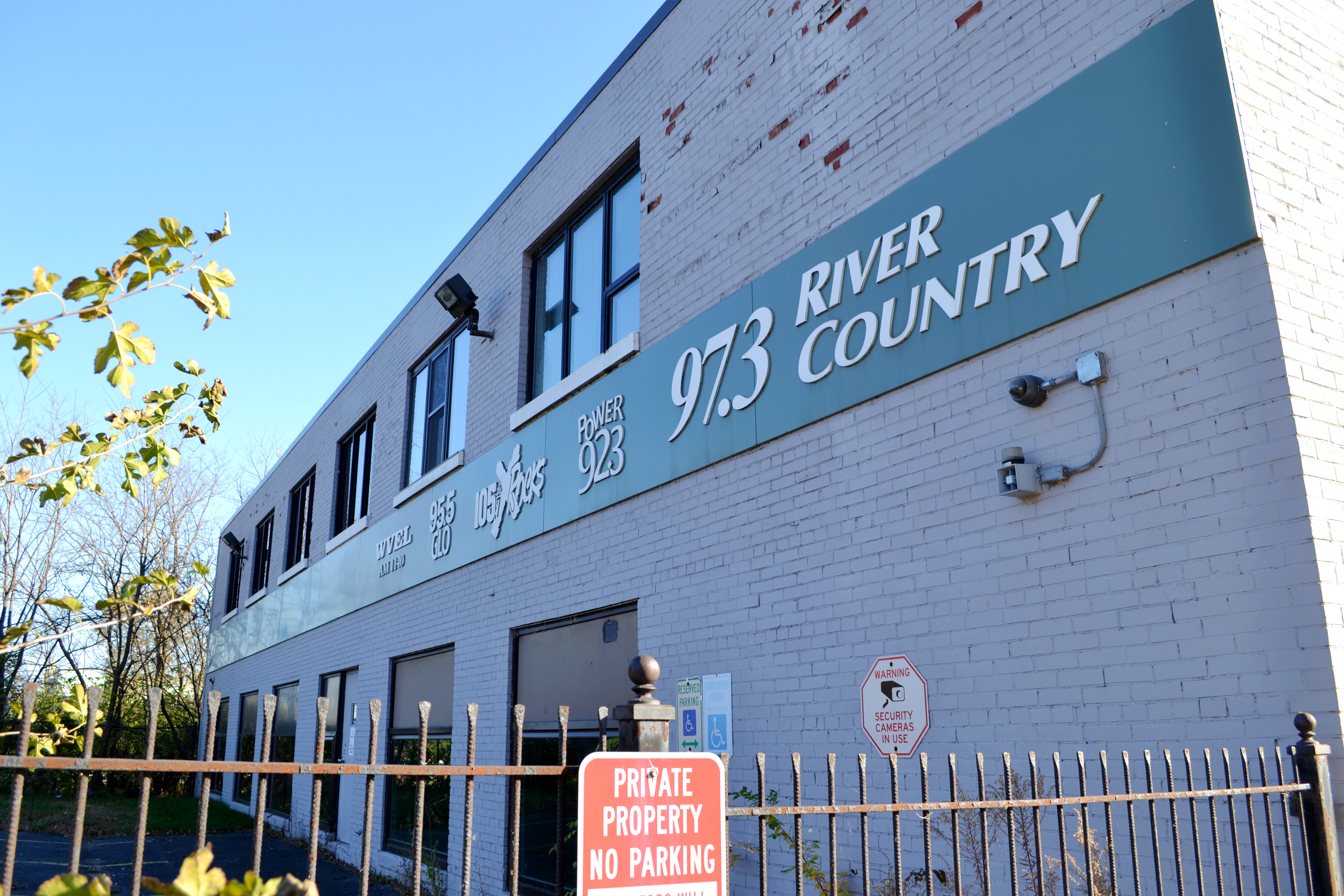
- Studio in downtown Peoria
- Peoria, Illinois; United States
- Frequency: 92.3 MHz
- Branding: Z92.3

Programming
- Format: Rhythmic contemporary
- Affiliations: Compass Media Networks

Ownership
- Owner: Cumulus Media; (Radio License Holding CBC, LLC)
- Sister stations: WFYR, WGLO, WIXO, WVEL

History
- First air date: November 1992
- Former call signs: WBGE (1990–2000)

Technical information
- Licensing authority: FCC
- Facility ID: 3464
- Class: B1
- ERP: 19,200 watts
- HAAT: 114 meters (374 ft)

Links
- Public license information: Public file; LMS
- Webcast: Listen Live
- Website: z923peoria.com

WZPW (92.3 FM, "Z92.3") is a radio station in Central Illinois with a rhythmic top 40 music format, licensed to Peoria, Illinois and broadcasting with an effective radiated power (ERP) of 19,200 watts. The station is owned by Cumulus Media, which purchased the station from Townsquare Media.

== History ==
WZPW, whose first owners were awarded an FCC license on October 17, 1990, originally signed on the air in November 1992 as urban contemporary WBGE ("B92"), but by the end of the decade, they would start incorporating Rhythmic pop, shifting the station's format direction. WBGE was sold in early 2000 to become what was the first of two radio stations for AAA Entertainment in the Peoria market (AAA also owned WWKX in Providence, Rhode Island, who would later become WZPW's sister station). On January 20, 1999, WBGE flipped to rhythmic oldies as "Jammin' Oldies 92.3", but would flip back to Rhythmic CHR in October 2000 as "POWER 92" after a backlash from listeners and local groups (among them the NAACP). The call letters were changed to WZPW.

In 2001, WZPW began expanding its format into the Bloomington area, where it was heard on WRPW. In early 2002, WZPW upgraded its signal to 19,200 watts and moved to a new tower near Kickapoo, Illinois. By 2006, WZPW and WRPW stopped simulcasting after AAA sold WZPW to Regent Broadcasting (the predecessor to Townsquare Media). AAA kept WRPW, however, it later sold it and its sister properties in Bloomington to Great Plains Media. The station's branding was also changed to Power 92.3. On August 30, 2007, the Rhythmic format on WRPW ceased to exist as Great Plains Media relaunched the radio station with an FM Talk format as "Cities 92-9," leaving WZPW as the only surviving part of the previously-successful simulcast (Bloomington-Normal would pick up a Rhythmic again in 2018, courtesy of WWHX).

The station in recent years has faced competition from WZPW's former sister station WPIA, but remains the top rated Top-40 station in Peoria. Another competitor, WKZF, has since changed formats to Classic Hip-Hop and later, Rhythmic Classic Hits.

On January 1, 2015, WZPW rebranded as "Peoria's 92.3". This would last until February 24, 2020, when WZPW rebranded again as "Z92.3", but retained its Rhythmic Top 40 format.

== Previous logos ==
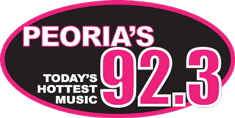
