= WHPI =

Radio station in Farmington–Peoria, Illinois

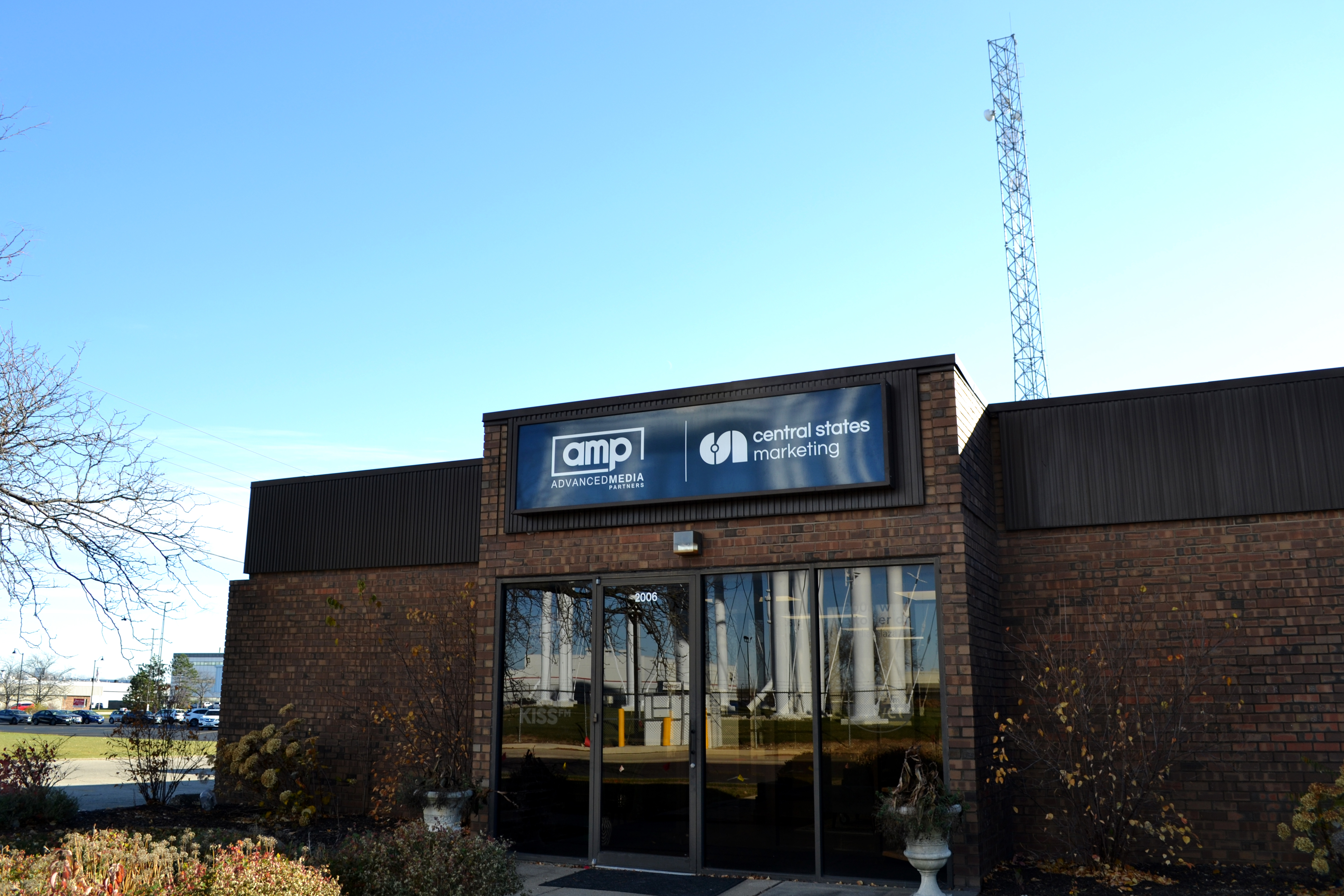
- Studio in Peoria

Farmington, Illinois; United States
- Broadcast area: Peoria metropolitan area
- Frequency: 96.5 MHz
- Branding: Shuffle Radio

Programming
- Format: Adult hits

Ownership
- Owner: Advanced Media Partners, LLC
- Sister stations: WPIA, WWCT, WZPN

History
- First air date: November 1997
- Former call signs: WJPL (1997–2003); WXMP (September 2003); WWCT (2003–2006); WRIA (2006–2007); WZPN (2007–2018)

Technical information
- Licensing authority: FCC
- Facility ID: 76410
- Class: A
- ERP: 4,300 watts
- HAAT: 115 meters (377 ft)
- Transmitter coordinates: 40°40′10.1″N 89°53′31.4″W (NAD83)

Links
- Public license information: Public file; LMS
- Webcast: Listen Live
- Website: shuffleradio.com

WHPI (96.5 FM) is a radio station licensed to Farmington, Illinois, and serving the Peoria metropolitan area. Owned by Advanced Media Partners, WHPI began airing an adult hits format as "Shuffle Radio" in September 2024.

== History ==
The station was assigned the call sign WJPL in 1997 and received its license on February 13, 1998. It came on the air under the ownership of Ann Johnston and Mike Rea. Johnston and Rea merged their station ownership into a larger group, AAA Entertainment, in June 2000.

The radio station originally went on the air in November 1997 with a rock format, then changed to "Smooth Jazz 96.5" through the rest of the decade. In August 2001, WJPL flipped to Hot AC as "The Point", featuring the syndicated Bob & Sheri morning show. The station added simulcast 94.3 for a short time.

In June 2003, AAA Entertainment moved the format to the much stronger 105.7 and rebranded as "Mix 105.7". WWCT, known for years as "Rock 106", moved down the dial to 96.5 to become "Rock 96.5" featuring Mancow in the morning. The station struggled with several airstaff changes and variations, including an all-request format.

AAA decided to sell the stations in 2006, finalizing the transfer to Independence Media in 2007. In September 2006, Independence Media began simulcasting its new CHR format on sister WPIA 98.5 as WRIA until its format change to sports talk on July 1, 2007. 96.5 had changed its callsign to WZPN six days earlier.

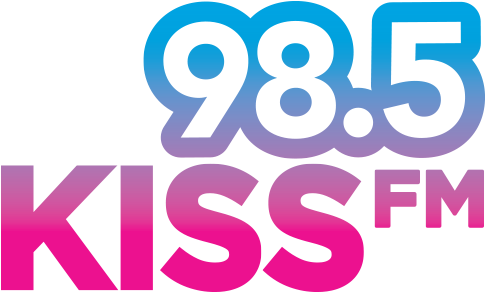
Former logo as Kiss FM

In November 2010, Independence Media Holdings sold WPIA, along with its other 3 Peoria-area stations (98.5 WPIA Eureka, 99.9 WWCT Bartonville, and 101.1 WHPI Glasford) to Michael S. Rea Advanced Media Partners.

On June 6, 2018, sister station WHPI became the primary station for "ESPN Peoria" with 96.5 as the simulcast until a new format is planned. The stations swapped call signs on June 26, 2018, with 96.5 taking the call sign WHPI and 101.1 taking the WZPN call sign.

On September 5, 2020, the station dropped its sports format and resumed simulcasting WPIA's CHR format as 98.5 Kiss FM. On September 3, 2024, WHPI dropped its simulcast with WPIA and began stunting with all-Taylor Swift music as Tay Radio until September 20, 2024, when it flipped to adult hits Shuffle Radio.
