= WPIA =

Radio station in Eureka–Peoria, Illinois

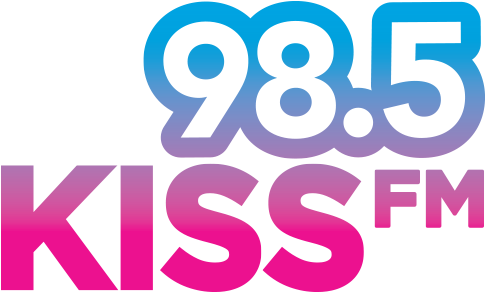

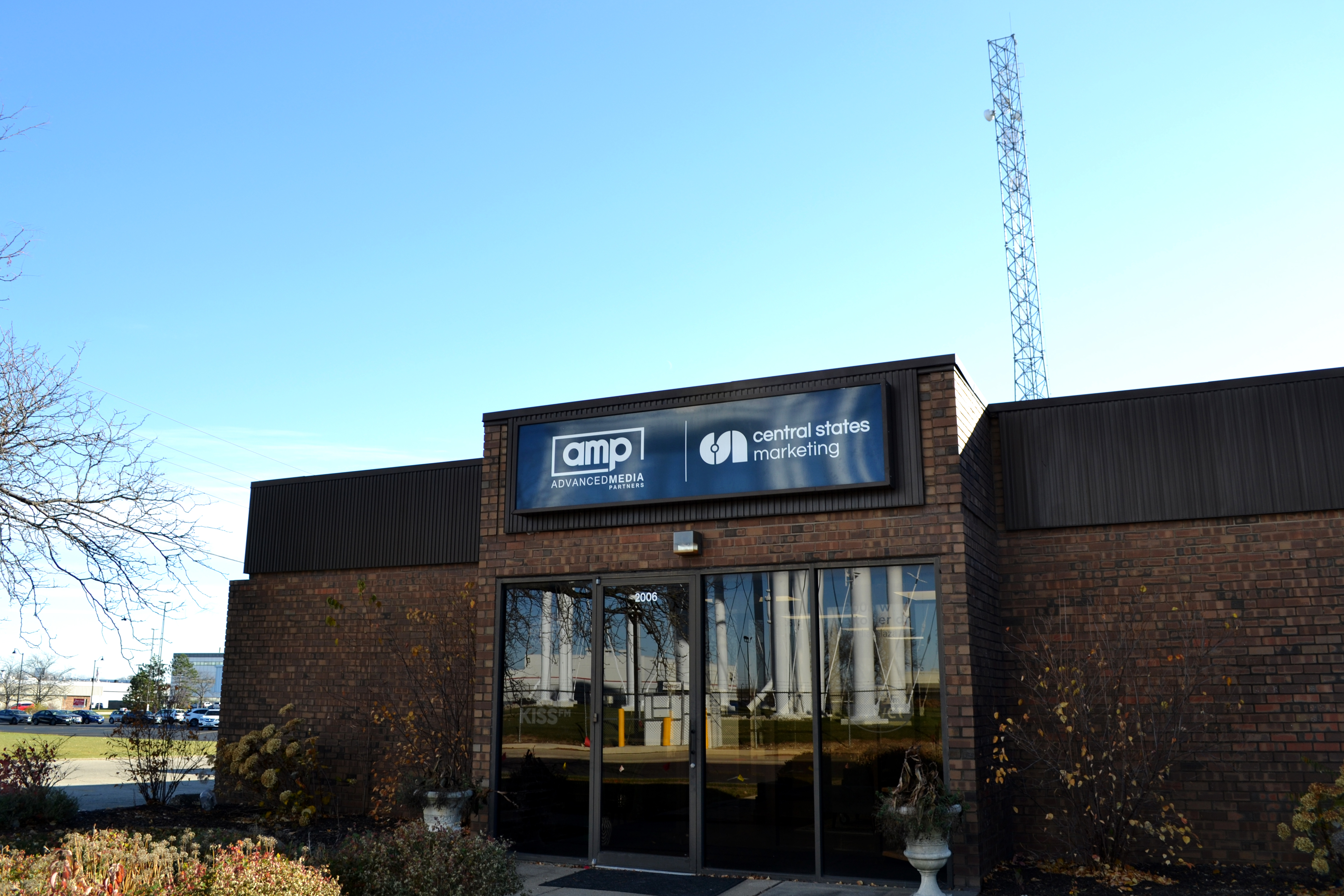
- Studio in Peoria
- Eureka, Illinois; United States
- Broadcast area: Peoria metropolitan area
- Frequency: 98.5 MHz (HD Radio)
- Branding: 98.5 Kiss FM

Programming
- Format: Top 40 (CHR)
- Subchannels: HD2: WHPI simulcast (adult hits)
- Affiliations: Compass Media Networks; Premiere Networks; United Stations Radio Networks

Ownership
- Owner: Advanced Media Partners, LLC
- Sister stations: WHPI; WWCT; WZPN

History
- First air date: August 22, 1988
- Former call signs: WCRI (1988–1994); WIVR (1994–1997); WEEK-FM (1997–1999); WPPY (1999–2000); WRVP (2000–2004)
- Call sign meaning: Peoria (also Peoria airport code)

Technical information
- Licensing authority: FCC
- Facility ID: 28317
- Class: A
- ERP: 6,000 watts
- HAAT: 100 meters (330 ft)
- Transmitter coordinates: 40°42′57.1″N 89°27′50.3″W (NAD83)
- Translator: HD2: 104.3 W282BS (Dunlap)

Links
- Public license information: Public file; LMS
- Webcast: Listen live
- Website: www.kisspeoria.com

WPIA (98.5 FM) is a commercial radio station licensed to Eureka, Illinois, and serving the Peoria metropolitan area. The station broadcasts a Top 40 (CHR) radio format. The station is owned and operated by Advanced Media Partners, LLC, and is known as 98.5 KISS FM.

WPIA and WHPI carry two nationally syndicated shows from Premiere Networks: Elvis Duran and the Morning Show from WHTZ New York City and American Top 40 with Ryan Seacrest on weekends, along with Liveline hosted live by Mason Kelter from his house in Boston every weeknight.

== History ==
The station signed on the air on August 22, 1988. It originally was WCRI, playing an adult standards - middle of the road (MOR) format. It was owned by Woodford County Radio, Inc. WCRI programmed local news, farm news including grain and livestock prices, high school and Eureka College sports as well as a blend of 1940s, 1950s, and 1960s music. Local librarians created and hosted a weekly five-minute program "Queries, Quips and Quotes". The daily talk show "Woodford County Today" focused on community and area events. Students from the local grade school read the daily lunch menu. The station operated at 3,000 watts; the transmitter and antenna were located about a mile north of Eureka. The studios were at 103 North Major, across the street from the courthouse to the west and Eureka Hospital to the south. The station was sold in 1994 to the owner of WPOK in Pontiac, and his business partners, and became WIVR with an adult contemporary format.

After three years as WIVR, "98.5 The River", the station was bought by the owners of WEEK-TV in 1996, who would turn it into "Oldies 98.5" with the callsign WEEK-FM the following year, the only radio station owned by Granite Broadcasting. After 93.3 became WPBG ("Big Oldies 93.3"), putting it in direct competition with WEEK-FM, 98.5's ratings slid and Granite sold the radio station to Cromwell Group. In March 1998, WEEK-FM flipped to hot AC.

Beginning in August 1999, the station was called WPPY, "98.5 The Party", with a Top 40/CHR format. In August 2000, WPPY added a simulcast on 101.1 WRVP (now WHPI), then swapping callsigns with 101.1 to become WRVP itself.

In March 2004, the simulcast with WPPY was broken, as WRVP's call letters were changed to WPIA and flipped to Christian rock as "Hope 98.5". In September 2006, then-owners Regent Communications (who were also the owner of rival WZPW until its sale to Cumulus Media in 2012) sold the station and 101.1 FM (then WVEL-FM) to Independence Media Holdings, who also bought 96.5 WHPI (then WWCT) from AAA Entertainment and returned the Top 40/CHR format to 98.5, but this time adding a simulcast with the latter frequency to form "96.5 & 98.5 KISS FM". On July 1, 2007, 98.5 stopped simulcasting 96.5.

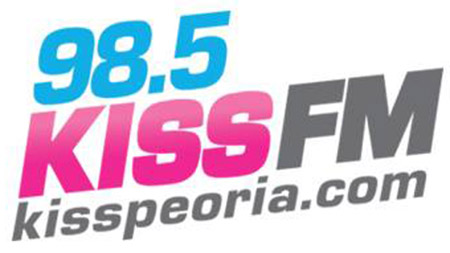
Logo through June 2018

Independence Media Holdings sold WPIA, along with its other three Peoria-area stations (WZPN, WWCT, and WHPI) to Advanced Media Partners on November 15, 2010.

On September 5, 2020, at midnight, the station added a simulcast once again on 96.5 as that frequency ended its run as an ESPN Radio affiliate.
