= WIXO =

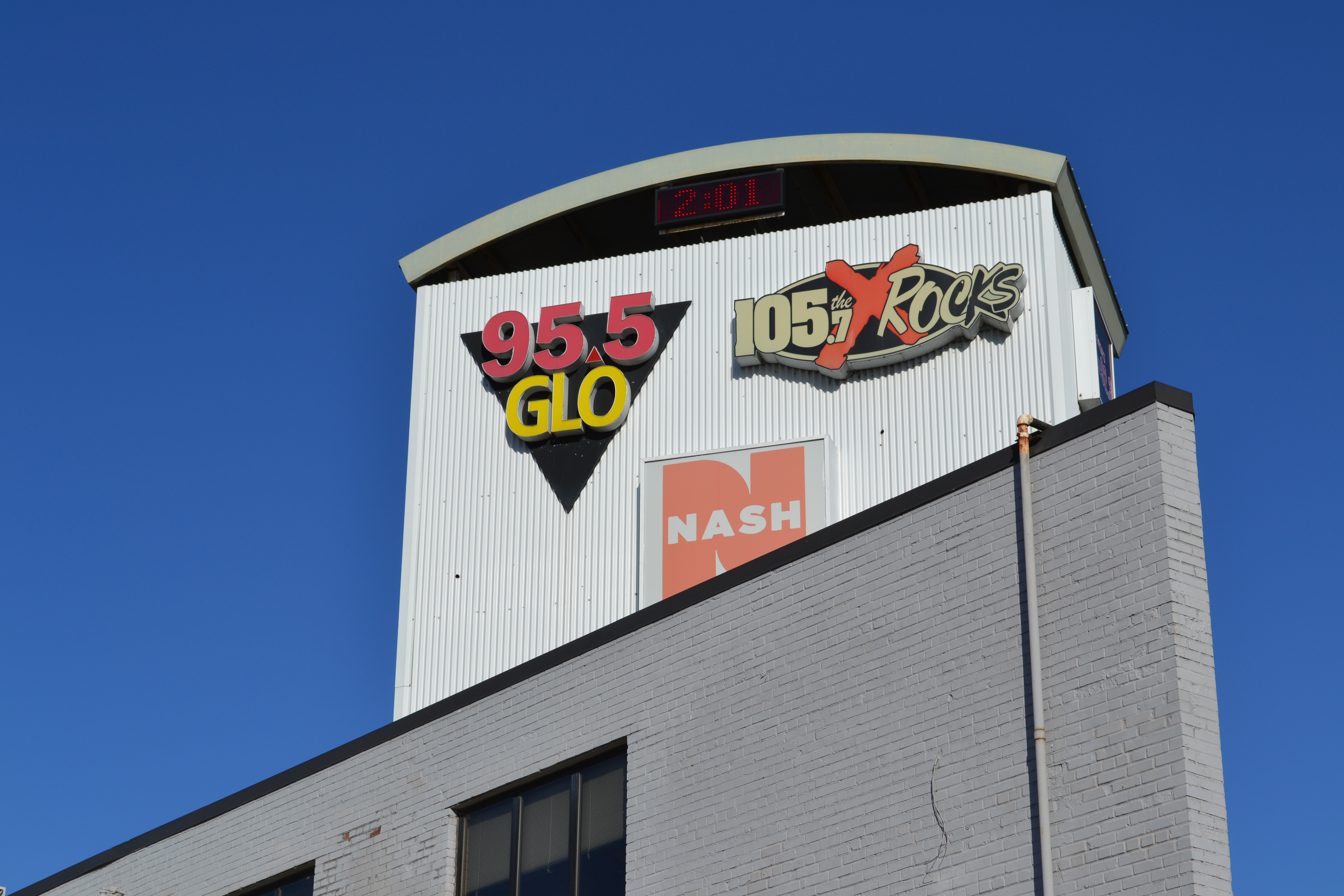
- WIXO Studio in downtown Peoria
- Peoria, Illinois; United States
- Frequency: 105.7 MHz
- Branding: 105.7 The X

Programming
- Format: Active rock
- Affiliations: Compass Media Networks

Ownership
- Owner: Cumulus Media; (Radio License Holding CBC, LLC)
- Sister stations: WFYR, WGLO, WVEL, WZPW

History
- First air date: May 14, 1978; 47 years ago (original 105.7 as WWTO); 1996; 30 years ago (original WIXO on 99.9)
- Former call signs: WWTO (197?–1976); WWCT (1976–2003); WXMP (2003–2006)

Technical information
- Licensing authority: FCC
- Facility ID: 9894
- Class: B
- ERP: 39,000 watts
- HAAT: 169.1 meters (555 ft)
- Transmitter coordinates: 40°43′25.0″N 89°29′4.0″W (NAD83)

Links
- Public license information: Public file; LMS
- Webcast: Listen Live
- Website: 1057thexrocks.com

WIXO (105.7 FM, "105.7 The X") is a radio station in Peoria, Illinois. It is owned by Cumulus Media, which also owns several other radio stations in the market. Cumulus purchased WIXO and its sister stations from Townsquare Media. Originally on 99.9 MHz before 2006, it moved to 105.7, a much higher-power license that reaches a large portion of Central Illinois.

The name is based on several factors, one being the frequency (105.7) and the other being the fact that it recently relocated from 99.9 having been under the name 99X, and the "X" in the name had become an inherent part of the station. The "X" in the previous name had come from the call letters WIXO. The station features an active rock music format. Also, on the original frequency, the slogan 99X Rocks! had been used and appeared on the station logo, and the phrase became commonly used as the station name. Thus, the new frequency uses the phrase "105.7 The X Rocks!", which can also be seen on the new logo.

== 105.7 before WIXO ==
=== WWTO and WWCT ===
The original 105.7 was operating as Drake-Chenault programmed WWTO in the early 1970s. In 1976, the station changed its callsign to WWCT and made its debut as an album rock station. Calling itself simply "106" or "WWCT" early on, by the 1990s it was using the nickname "Rock 106". Some of their well-known positioning statements included "Rockin' With The Best" and "The Home Of Rock n Roll." Much of their time was spent downtown on both Jefferson St. and 1111 Main St. They moved uptown in 1997 to War Memorial Dr. near Northwoods Mall.

In late 1998 Bruce Foster sold the station to Kelly Communications. Kelly took over immediately with an LMA and brought in satellite programming in lieu of local jocks. A Peoria Journal Star article talking about the station's DJs located in Dallas became fodder for competitor WGLO. In the summer of 1999, Kelly Communications decided to offer a lower price than what was originally negotiated in the sale, and Foster decided to back out of the deal. In what amounts to a legendary story, a group of jocks from the old WWCT days went to the transmitter site on a Friday afternoon and took back control of the station with the words "We're back, and we're pissed off!" Through the weekend a great number of former jocks, local leaders, and even competing radio station personnel took part in an anything-goes broadcast from the transmitter site in rural Tazewell County, Illinois.

In 2000 WWCT was acquired by AAA Entertainment Radio Group, moved towards an active rock format, and was named "Rock 105.7" towards the end of the format on 105.7 in 2003.

=== WXMP ===
AAA replaced WWCT with "Mix 105.7" and the callsign WXMP, and marketed the station as a Bloomington-Normal station for some time despite the station being licensed to Peoria.

AAA Entertainment exited the Peoria market in September 2006 during a shakeup in Peoria radio ownership, selling 101.1 at Glasford, Illinois to Independence Media Holdings, who moved the WXMP callsign and format there, and selling 105.7 to Regent Communications, owners of 99.9 WIXO at Bartonville, Illinois.

== WIXO ==
WIXO debuted as the first station on the 99.9 frequency for Bartonville, Illinois in February 1997, and was known as "99X, Peoria's Modern Rock Alternative". It featured the alternative rock format. Original DJ's included Ian Chase, Jeff Williams, Stephanie Aaron, and Jay Wolfe.

The move from 99.9 to 105.7 allowed WIXO to be heard in an area around three times larger than it originally could.

WWCT, which was originally at 105.7 itself, moved from 96.5 to 99.9.

== See also ==
- WWCT — former 105.7 and current 99.9
