= WVEL =

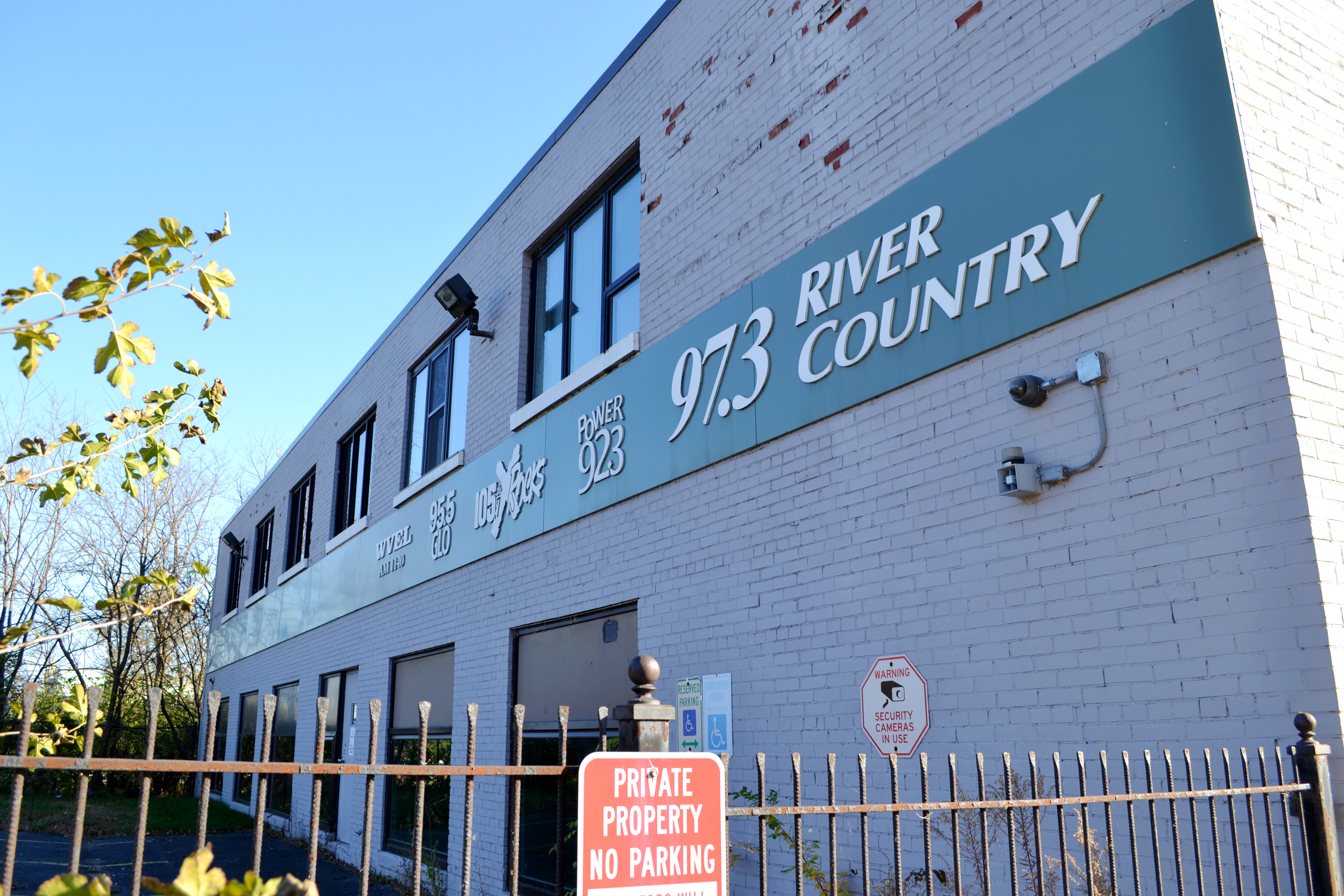
- Former Townsquare Media studio in downtown Peoria
- Pekin, Illinois; United States
- Broadcast area: Peoria metropolitan area
- Frequency: 1140 kHz
- Branding: AM 1140 WVEL

Programming
- Format: Urban gospel

Ownership
- Owner: Cumulus Media; (Radio License Holding CBC, LLC)
- Sister stations: WFYR, WGLO, WIXO, WZPW

History
- First air date: April 21, 1946
- Former call signs: WSIV (1946–1979)
- Call sign meaning: Velvet (former music format)

Technical information
- Licensing authority: FCC
- Facility ID: 68623
- Class: D
- Power: 5,000 watts (day); 3,200 watts (critical hours)
- Transmitter coordinates: 40°36′12″N 89°37′32″W

Links
- Public license information: Public file; LMS
- Webcast: Listen live
- Website: www.wvel.com

WVEL (AM 1140) is a daytimer radio station licensed to Pekin, Illinois, and serving the Peoria metropolitan area. It is owned by Cumulus Media with the license held by Radio License Holding CBC, LLC. It broadcasts an urban gospel format, with some Christian talk and teaching shows, and is known as "Central Illinois' Christian Voice." The radio studios and offices are with its Cumulus sister stations in Bloomington and Peoria.

By day, WVEL transmits 5,000 watts non-directional. As 1140 kHz is a clear channel frequency, reserved for Class A WRVA Richmond, Virginia, and XEMR Monterrey, Mexico, WVEL must sign off at sunset to avoid interference. During critical hours, WVEL has a power of 3,200 watts.

== History ==
The station signed on the air on April 21, 1946. The original call sign was WSIV. It increased its power to 1,000 watts on 1948. The station was assigned the WVEL call letters by the Federal Communications Commission on January 2, 1979. Before it was acquired by Cumulus Media in 2012, it was owned by Townsquare Media.
