= Bartonville, Illinois =

Bartonville
- Village
- Village of Bartonville
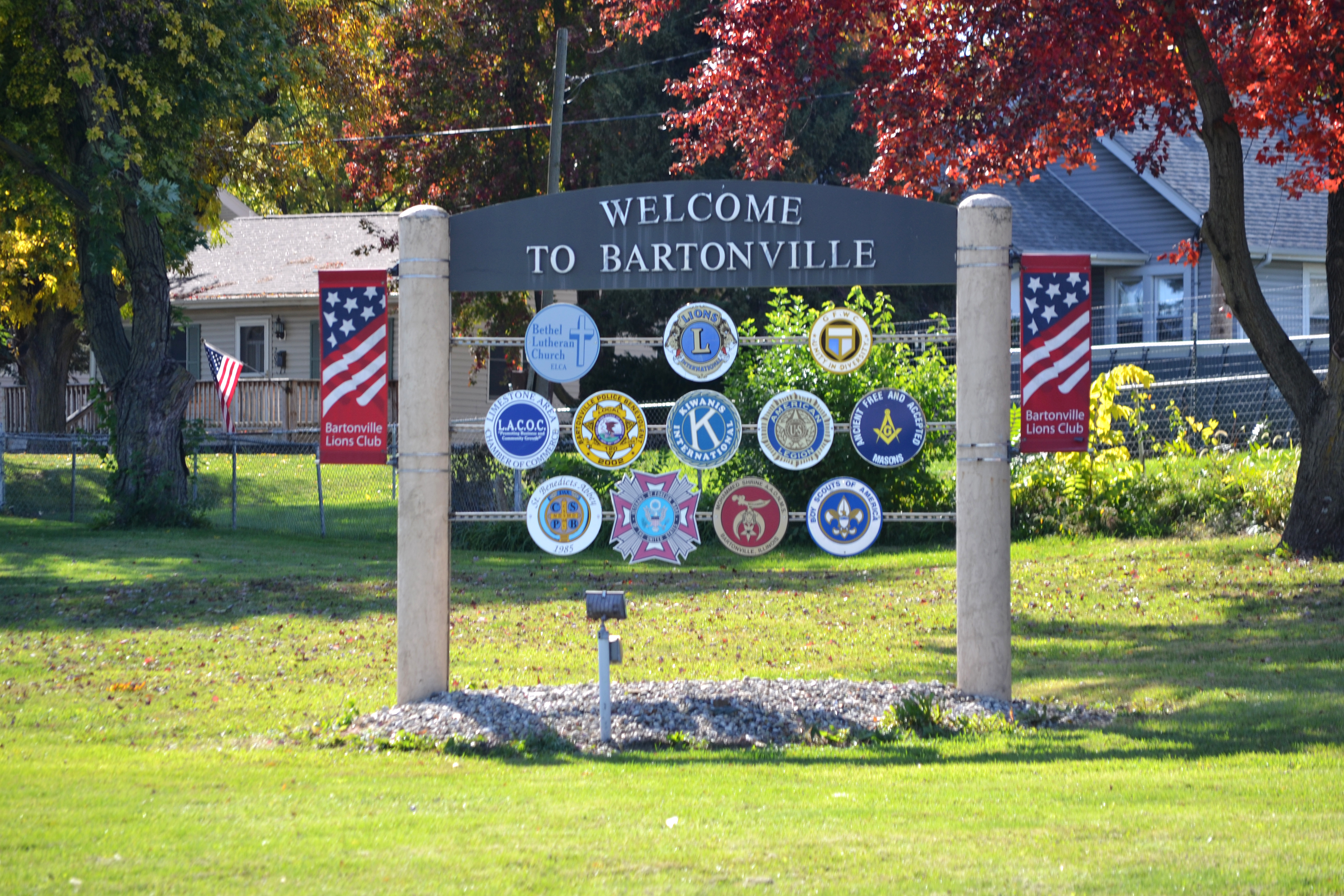
- Bartonville sign on east side of town, S Adams Street

- Location of Bartonville in Peoria County, Illinois.
- Coordinates: 40°38′07″N 89°38′50″W
- Country: United States
- State: Illinois
- County: Peoria
- Townships: Limestone, West Peoria
- Founded: 1878
- Founder: W.C.H. Barton

Government
  - Mayor: Leon Ricca

Area
  - Total: 8.50 sq mi (22.01 km^{2})
  - Land: 8.05 sq mi (20.85 km^{2})
  - Water: 0.45 sq mi (1.16 km^{2})
- Elevation: 617 ft (188 m)

Population (2020)
  - Total: 5,945
  - Estimate (2024): 5,836
  - Density: 738.5/sq mi (285.14/km^{2})
- Time zone: UTC-6 (CST)
  - Summer (DST): UTC-5 (CDT)
- ZIP code: 61607
- Area code: 309
- FIPS code: 17-04039
- GNIS feature ID: 2398045
- Website: https://bartonville.org/

Bartonville is a village in Peoria County, Illinois, United States. The population was 5,945 at the 2020 census. Bartonville is a suburb of Peoria and is part of the Peoria, Illinois Metropolitan Statistical Area.

== Geography ==
According to the 2010 census, Bartonville has a total area of 8.615 square miles (22.31 km^{2}), of which 8.19 square miles (21.21 km^{2}) (or 95.07%) is land and 0.425 square miles (1.10 km^{2}) (or 4.93%) is water.

Bartonville is situated on U.S. Route 24, Interstate I-474, part of the Illinois River Road: Route of the Voyagers National Scenic Byway.

== Demographics ==
Historical population
Census	Pop.	Note	%±
1910	1,536		—
1920	1,588		3.4%
1930	1,886		18.8%
1940	1,879		−0.4%
1950	2,437		29.7%
1960	7,253		197.6%
1970	7,221		−0.4%
1980	6,137		−15.0%
1990	5,643		−8.0%
2000	6,310		11.8%
2010	6,471		2.6%
2020	5,945		−8.1%
U.S. Decennial Census

=== 2020 census ===
As of the 2020 census, Bartonville had a population of 5,945. The median age was 43.3 years. 19.7% of residents were under the age of 18 and 20.4% of residents were 65 years of age or older. For every 100 females there were 94.7 males, and for every 100 females age 18 and over there were 92.8 males age 18 and over.

96.9% of residents lived in urban areas, while 3.1% lived in rural areas.

There were 2,614 households in Bartonville, of which 25.2% had children under the age of 18 living in them. Of all households, 44.0% were married-couple households, 19.2% were households with a male householder and no spouse or partner present, and 28.5% were households with a female householder and no spouse or partner present. About 32.3% of all households were made up of individuals and 14.6% had someone living alone who was 65 years of age or older.

There were 2,815 housing units, of which 7.1% were vacant. The homeowner vacancy rate was 2.6% and the rental vacancy rate was 8.7%.

Racial composition as of the 2020 census
Race	Number	Percent
White	5,358	90.1%
Black or African American	102	1.7%
American Indian and Alaska Native	20	0.3%
Asian	26	0.4%
Native Hawaiian and Other Pacific Islander	2	0.0%
Some other race	43	0.7%
Two or more races	394	6.6%
Hispanic or Latino (of any race)	186	3.1%

=== 2000 census ===
As of the census of 2000, there were 6,310 people, 2,601 households, and 1,810 families residing in the village. The population density was 786.2 inhabitants per square mile (303.6/km^{2}). There were 2,699 housing units at an average density of 336.3 per square mile (129.8/km^{2}). The racial makeup of the village was 98.08% White, 0.40% African American, 0.06% Native American, 0.38% Asian, 0.02% Pacific Islander, 0.33% from other races, and 0.73% from two or more races. Hispanic or Latino of any race were 0.97% of the population.

There were 2,601 households, out of which 29.0% had children under the age of 18 living with them, 56.4% were married couples living together, 9.8% had a female householder with no husband present, and 30.4% were non-families. 25.9% of all households were made up of individuals, and 11.5% had someone living alone who was 65 years of age or older. The average household size was 2.43 and the average family size was 2.90.

In the village, the population was spread out, with 23.1% under the age of 18, 7.7% from 18 to 24, 28.5% from 25 to 44, 24.2% from 45 to 64, and 16.5% who were 65 years of age or older. The median age was 39 years. For every 100 females, there were 94.0 males. For every 100 females age 18 and over, there were 90.5 males.

The median income for a household in the village was $40,766, and the median income for a family was $49,909. Males had a median income of $36,324 versus $24,214 for females. The per capita income for the village was $20,580. About 4.3% of families and 7.0% of the population were below the poverty line, including 12.4% of those under age 18 and 1.4% of those age 65 or over.

== Education ==
Elementary school districts covering parts of the town are Bartonville School District 66, Oak Grove School District 68, Hollis Consolidated School District 328, Limestone Walters Community Consolidated School District 316, Monroe School District 70, and Pleasant Hill School District 69. These elementary school districts are in Limestone Community High School District 310. A few areas to the east are in Peoria School District 150.

The local high school for the Limestone district part is Limestone Community High School.

== Important locations ==
Located directly to the north of the village are the General Wayne Downing Peoria International Airport and the 182d Airlift Wing of the United States Air Force.

The Peoria State Hospital was located in Bartonville until it closed in 1973.

The E.D. Edwards Power Plant, opened in 1960 and retired at the end of 2022 following a federal lawsuit filed in 2013 by local and national environmental groups.

== Notable people ==
- Mike Dunne, pitcher for several Major League Baseball teams,
- Jim Thome, Hall of Fame first baseman for several Major League Baseball teams.

== See also ==
- Peoria State Hospital
