= Glasford, Illinois =

Glasford
- Village
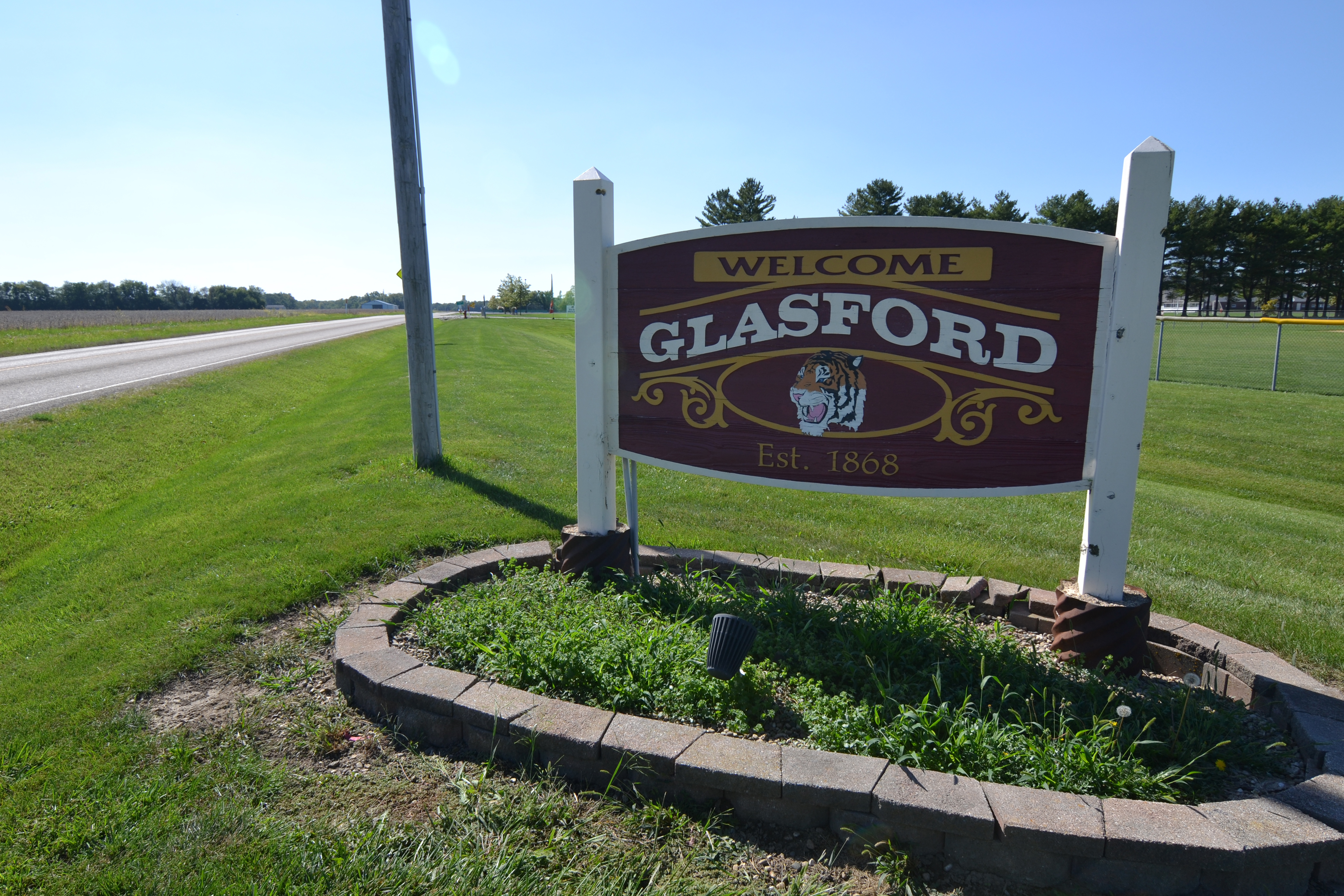
- Glasford sign near Illini Bluffs High School

- Location of Glasford in Peoria County, Illinois.
- Coordinates: 40°34′22″N 89°48′47″W
- Country: United States
- State: Illinois
- County: Peoria
- Founded: 1868
- Founder: Samuel A. Glasford

Government
  - Village President: Jack Rudd, Jr.

Area
  - Total: 0.91 sq mi (2.35 km^{2})
  - Land: 0.91 sq mi (2.35 km^{2})
  - Water: 0 sq mi (0.00 km^{2})
- Elevation: 614 ft (187 m)

Population (2020)
  - Total: 866
  - Density: 953.7/sq mi (368.22/km^{2})
- Time zone: UTC-6 (CST)
  - Summer (DST): UTC-5 (CDT)
- ZIP code: 61533
- Area code: 309
- FIPS code: 17-29483
- GNIS feature ID: 2398968
- Website: www.glasfordil.com

Glasford is a village in Peoria County, Illinois, United States. The population was 866 at the 2020 census. Glasford is part of the Peoria, Illinois Metropolitan Statistical Area.

== History ==
Glasford, or Glascoe, as it was called in 1868, was named for its founder, Samuel Alexander Glasford/Glassford (1824–1896).

Samuel A. Glasford, who arrived in Peoria County in 1842 from Muskingum County, Ohio and was one of the early settlers of Timber Township, purchased the site on which a Toledo, Peoria and Western Railway station would be built. After the railroad was built near his farm residence, Mr. Glasford laid out the town on December 9, 1868, later becoming incorporated as a village in 1889. Glasford would become a center of trade and population along the new route of the Toledo, Peoria and Western Railroad, bringing many new settlers and stores to the village in 1868. A post office was established on June 35, 1846, using the name Timber before being officially renamed to Glasford on January 7, 1869.

== Geography ==
According to the 2010 census, Glasford has a total area of 0.9 square miles (2.33 km^{2}), all land.

Glasford is located near the "Glasford Disturbance", an area in which the normal layering of the bedrock has been highly disturbed. This is believed to be an ancient meteorite crater known as the Glasford crater. The impact fractured the bedrock and upended large blocks of sedimentary rocks. The crater has been completely filled by glacial action so that no trace appears on the surface.

== Demographics ==
Historical population
Census	Pop.	Note	%±
1880	154		—
1890	268		74.0%
1900	409		52.6%
1910	625		52.8%
1920	645		3.2%
1930	671		4.0%
1940	782		16.5%
1950	922		17.9%
1960	1,012		9.8%
1970	1,066		5.3%
1980	1,201		12.7%
1990	1,115		−7.2%
2000	1,076		−3.5%
2010	1,022		−5.0%
2020	866		−15.3%
U.S. Decennial Census

As of the census of 2000, there were 1,076 people, 426 households, and 311 families residing in the village. The population density was 1,218.4 inhabitants per square mile (470.4/km^{2}). There were 448 housing units at an average density of 507.3 per square mile (195.9/km^{2}). The racial makeup of the village was 99.44% White, 0.09% Native American, 0.19% from other races, and 0.28% from two or more races. Hispanic or Latino of any race were 1.02% of the population.

There were 426 households, out of which 32.9% had children under the age of 18 living with them, 58.5% were married couples living together, 10.6% had a female householder with no husband present, and 26.8% were non-families. 23.0% of all households were made up of individuals, and 12.4% had someone living alone who was 65 years of age or older. The average household size was 2.53 and the average family size was 2.94.

In the village, the population was spread out, with 24.3% under the age of 18, 10.2% from 18 to 24, 28.4% from 25 to 44, 24.3% from 45 to 64, and 12.6% who were 65 years of age or older. The median age was 36 years. For every 100 females, there were 90.8 males. For every 100 females age 18 and over, there were 87.6 males.

The median income for a household in the village was $37,019, and the median income for a family was $46,818. Males had a median income of $37,250 versus $21,188 for females. The per capita income for the village was $16,754. About 5.4% of families and 7.1% of the population were below the poverty line, including 6.7% of those under age 18 and 5.2% of those age 65 or over.

Glasford is located in the Illini Bluffs Unit School District 327, and is home to the Illini Bluffs Elementary School, Illini Bluffs Middle School, and Illini Bluffs High School.
